= Jobst Wagner =

Swiss entrepreneur (born 1959)

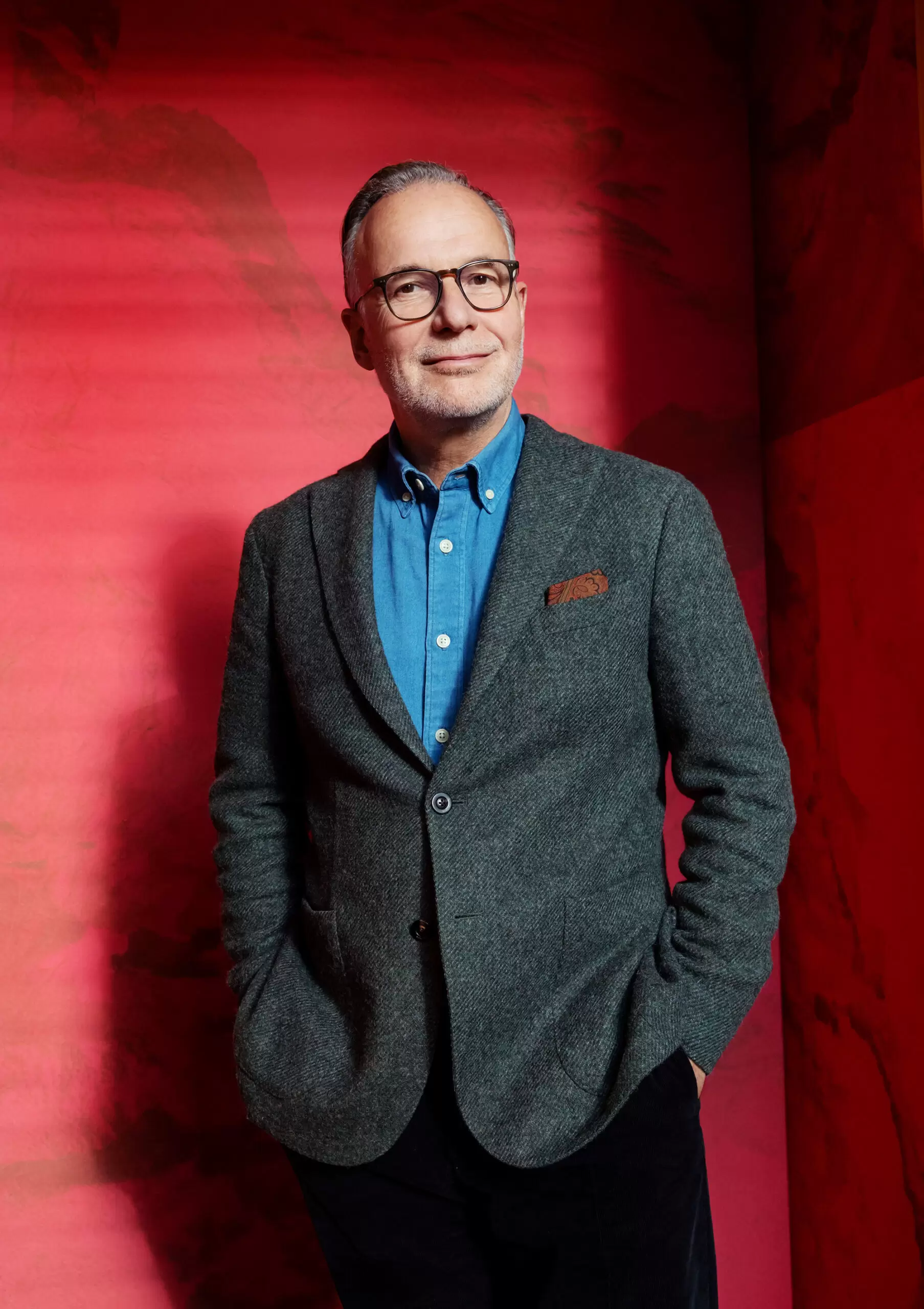
Jobst Wagner (2024)

Jobst Wagner (born 20 February 1959 in Rehau) is a Swiss entrepreneur. He has held several positions at Rehau Group, including chairman and vice-chairman of the supervisory board.

== Career ==
Starting in 1986, he worked in different positions at Rehau Group, a company founded by his father in Rehau, Germany. In 2000, Wagner's father transferred control of the company to Wagner and his brother, Veit. As Chairman of the Supervisory Board of the Rehau group, Wagner led approximately 18,000 employees across 50 countries.

In December 2018, following the acquisition of MB Barter & Trading by REHAU, Wagner was confirmed as a member of the new board of directors.

On 1 July 2021, Wagner took over the role of vice-chairman of the supervisory board, with his brother Veit taking over his former position as chairman.

Wagner is also one of the largest shareholders of the SMH Verlag AG and is member of the supervisory board. He is the founder and the Research Council within the Foundation StrategieDialog21. The StrategieDialog21 (SD21) sees itself as a dialogue platform with a focus on federally-liberal values and derived strategic approaches and impulses for Switzerland.

== Personal life ==
After attending schools in Canada, Germany and Switzerland, he graduated in law (lic.jur.) from the University of Bern.

He is also an honorary citizen of La Chapelle-Saint-Ursin, France.

Wagner also supports a large number of cultural institutions in Switzerland. Amongst others, he is the president of the Kunsthalle Bern foundation, member of the foundation board for the Bern Kunstmuseum and GegenwART foundation, as well as advisory board member of the Bern University of the Arts. Together with the Hochfranken business initiative he also supports the International Film Festival Hof.

== Reception ==
In 1999, Wagner received an award for his activities with GegenwART of the ‘Handels- und Industrieverein’ Bern.

In 2018, Bavarian State Minister for Economic Affairs, Energy and Technology Franz Josef Pschierer awarded Wagner the State Medal for special services to the Bavarian economy.

== Literature ==
- Macher und Mäzen. In: WirtschaftsBlatt. 9. November 2006, pp. 6. (online, in German).
- Schweizer Standards - Aus bester Familie: 100 vorbildliche Schweizer Familienunternehmen, ISBN 978-3-03823-606-1. (in German and French)
- Vom Sammeln, with text contributions from Norberto Gramaccini, Michael Krethlow, Reto Sorg and Jobst Wagner, Publisher: Jobst Wagner, ISBN 978-3-9523742-2-1.
