= Höllbach =

Höllbach may refer to:

- Höllbach (Schwesnitz), a river of Bavaria, Germany
- Höllbach (Tiefenbach), a river of Baden-Württemberg, Germany

== See also ==
- Höllbachgspreng
