= Gomringer =

Gomringer is a surname, probably of German origin. Notable people with the surname include:

- Eugen Gomringer (1925–2025), Bolivian-born Swiss concrete poet
- Nora Gomringer (born 1980), German and Swiss poet and writer, daughter of Eugen

== See also ==
- Cubeatz, a German hip hop duo, consisting of twin brothers Kevin and Tim Gomringer
