= Höllbach (Schwesnitz) =

Stream in Germany and the Czech Republic

Höllbach Pekelský potok

Location
- Countries: Germany; Czech Republic
- State (DE) Region (CZ): Bavaria; Karlovy Vary

Physical characteristics
- Source
  - location: Krásná/Rehau, Fichtel Mountains
  - coordinates: 50°16′2″N 12°7′4″E
  - elevation: 591 m (1,939 ft)
- Mouth
  - location: Schwesnitz
  - coordinates: 50°16′0″N 12°7′7″E
  - elevation: 520 m (1,710 ft)
- Length: 8.4 km (5.2 mi)
- Basin size: 29.7 km^{2} (11.5 sq mi)

Basin features
- Progression: Schwesnitz→ Saale→ Elbe→ North Sea

The Höllbach (Czech: Pekelský potok) is a stream in Germany and the Czech Republic. It is the secondary source of the Schwesnitz Stream. It is 8.4 km (5.2 mi) long.

== Characteristic ==
The stream is 8.4 km (5.2 mi) long. For 1.7 km (1.1 mi), it forms the state border between Germany and the Czech Republic. The drainage basin has an area of 29.7 km^{2} (11.5 sq mi), of which 22.8 km^{2} (8.8 sq mi) is in Germany. The longest tributary is the brook Mähringgsbach (Czech: Úterský potok), which is 4.3 km (2.7 mi) long.

== Course ==
Within Germany, the stream flows exclusively through the territory of Rehau, Bavaria. The section on the Czech–German border flows on the municipal border of Krásná. After its confluence with the Perlenbach Stream in the centre of Rehau, it further continues as the Schwesnitz Stream.

== See also ==
- List of rivers of Bavaria
- List of rivers of the Czech Republic
