= Brothers Grimm Prize of the City of Hanau =

Literary prize of Hesse, Germany

Brothers Grimm Prize of the City of Hanau is a literary prize of Hesse. The prize, awarded by the City of Hanau, honors the Brothers Grimm, who were both born in Hanau. The prize is endowed with €10,000 and has been awarded since 1983. The ceremony takes place in November in memory of the Göttingen Seven.

== Winners ==
- 1983 Wolfgang Hilbig for Abwesenheit
- 1985 Anna Mitgutsch for Die Züchtigung
- 1987 Wilhelm Bartsch for Übungen im Joch
- 1989 Natascha Wodin for Einmal lebt ich
- 1991 Monika Maron for Stille Zeile sechs
- 1993 Harald Weinrich for Textgrammatik der deutschen Sprache
- 1995 Adolf Endler for Tarzan am Prenzlauer Berg
- 1997 Harry Rowohlt (for Translation)
- 1999 Georg Klein for Libidissi
- 2001 Heinz Czechowski for Die Zeit steht still and Das offene Geheimnis
- 2003 Klaus Böldl for Die fernen Inseln
- 2005 Felicitas Hoppe for Verbrecher und Versager
- 2005 Andreas Reimann for Zwischen den Untergängen
- 2007 Björn Kern for Die Erlöser AG
- 2009 Natascha Wodin for Nachtgeschwister
- 2011 Reinhard Kaiser (for Translation)
- 2013 Christoph Ransmayr for Atlas eines ängstlichen Mannes
- 2015 no award
- 2017 Barbara Zoeke for Die Stunde der Spezialisten
- 2020 Valerie Fritsch for Herzklappen von Johnson & Johnson
- 2023 Anna Baar for Divân mit Schonbezug
- 2026 Volha Hapeyeva for Wörterbuch einer Nomadin
