= Laubmann =

Laubmann is a German language surname. Notable people with the name include:

- Alfred Laubmann (1886–1965), German zoologist and ornithologist
- Georg von Laubmann (1843–1909), German philologist and librarian
