= Carl Zuckmayer Medal =

German literary award

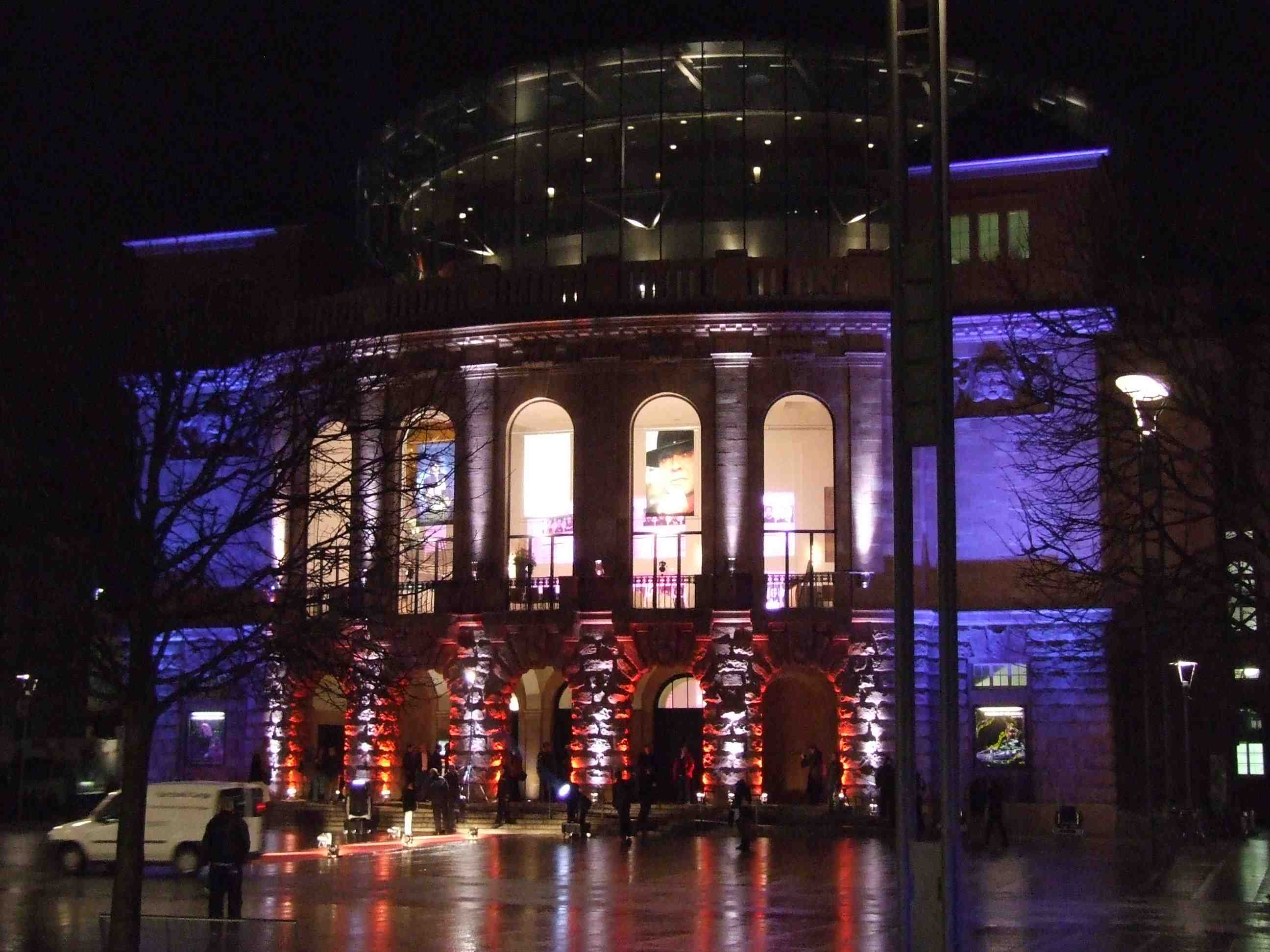
Staatstheater Mainz on the evening of the award of the Carl Zuckmayer Medal to Udo Lindenberg on 18 January 2007

The Carl Zuckmayer Medal (German: Carl-Zuckmayer-Medaille) is a literary prize given by the state of Rhineland-Palatinate in memory of Carl Zuckmayer. The medal itself was fashioned by state artist Otto Kallenbach. The prize is also given with a 30-liter cask of Nackenheimer wine from the Weingut Gunderloch, a winery valued by Zuckmayer. The bestowal takes place on 18 January, the anniversary of Zuckmayer's death.

== Winners ==
Menasse commenting on the Medal before the ceremony (2019)

- 1979: Günther Fleckenstein
- 1980: Werner Hinz
- 1982: Georg Hensel
- 1984: Friedrich Dürrenmatt
- 1985: Ludwig Harig
- 1986: Dolf Sternberger
- 1987: Tankred Dorst
- 1988: Günter Strack
- 1989: Hanns Dieter Hüsch
- 1990: Martin Walser, Adolf Muschg, André Weckmann
- 1991: Albrecht Schöne
- 1992: Hilde Domin
- 1993: Hans Sahl
- 1994: Fred Oberhauser
- 1995: Grete Weil
- 1996: Mario Adorf
- 1997: Katharina Thalbach
- 1998: Harald Weinrich
- 1999: Eva-Maria Hagen for her 1998 letter exchange with Wolf Biermann "Eva und der Wolf"
- 2000: Peter Rühmkorf
- 2001: Mirjam Pressler
- 2002: Herta Müller
- 2003: Monika Maron and Wolf von Lojewski
- 2004: Edgar Reitz
- 2005: Thomas Brussig
- 2006: Armin Mueller-Stahl
- 2007: Udo Lindenberg
- 2008: Bodo Kirchhoff
- 2009: Volker Schlöndorff
- 2010: Emine Sevgi Özdamar
- 2011: Hans Werner Kilz
- 2012: Uwe Timm
- 2013 Doris Dörrie
- 2014 Dieter Kühn
- 2015 Bruno Ganz
- 2016 Sven Regener
- 2017 Joachim Meyerhoff
- 2018 Yoko Tawada
- 2019 Robert Menasse
- 2020 Maren Kroymann
- 2021 Nora Gomringer
- 2022 Rafik Schami
- 2023 Nino Haratischwili
- 2024 Matthias Brandt
- 2025 Maria Schrader

== See also ==
- German literature
- List of literary awards
- List of poetry awards
- List of years in literature
- List of years in poetry
