= Schwesnitz =

River in Germany

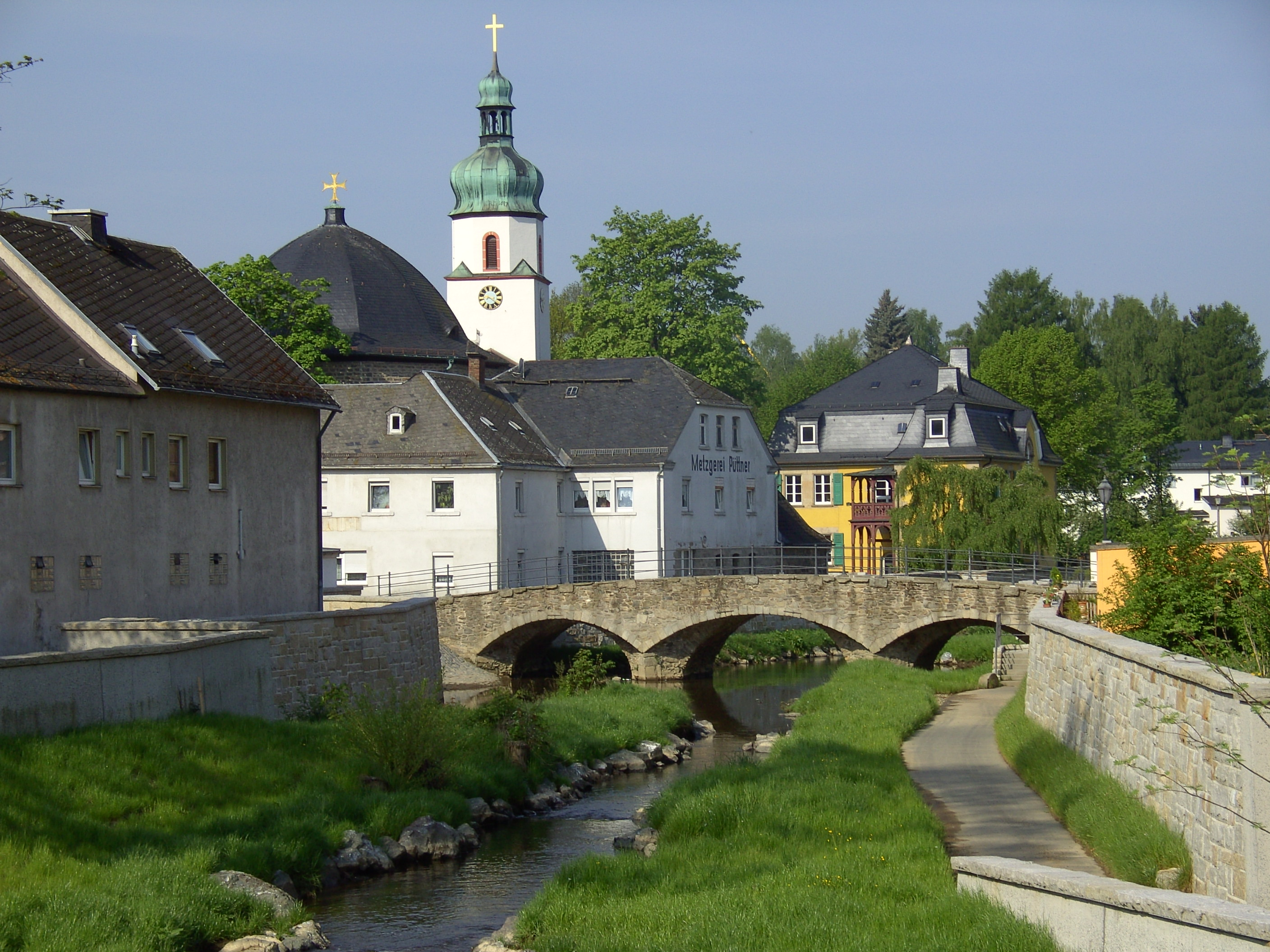
- The Schwesnitz in Oberkotzau

Location
- Country: Germany
- State: Bavaria

Physical characteristics
- Mouth
  - location: Saale
  - coordinates: 50.2640°N 11.9322°E
- Length: 10.0 km (6.2 mi)

Basin features
- Progression: Saale→ Elbe→ North Sea

Schwesnitz is a river of Bavaria, Germany. It is formed at the confluence of its source rivers Perlenbach and Höllbach in Rehau. It flows into the Saale in Oberkotzau.

== See also ==
- List of rivers of Bavaria
