= Fontane Prize of the City of Neuruppin =

German literary award

- Awarded for: authors of artistic literature who work in Brandenburg and who have already achieved their first literary success
- Location: Neuruppin
- Country: Germany
- Reward: €40,000
- First award: 1994
- Website: www.fontanepreis.de

The Fontane Prize of the City of Neuruppin was donated in 1994 on the occasion of the 175th birthday of Theodor Fontane from his native city of Neuruppin. Since 2019: Fontane-Literaturpreis der Fontanestadt Neuruppin und des Landes Brandenburg.

== History ==
The Fontane Literature Prize has several predecessors. It was awarded for the first time from 1913 to 1922, among others to Annette Kolb, Leonhard Frank, Carl Sternheim and Alfred Döblin. After 1949 there were two Fontane Prizes: The West Berlin Prize went to Hermann Kasack, Peter Huchel, Uwe Johnson, Arno Schmidt, Günter Grass, Wolf Biermann and Wolfgang Hilbig. Walter Kaufmann, Christa Wolf and Helga Schütz, for example, received the prize from the GDR district of Potsdam. In 1994 the Fontane Literature Prize was re-established by Theodor Fontane's birthplace Neuruppin, and since 2010 it has been awarded every two years with the support of the patron Hans E. Weber. The award winners included Lutz Seiler, Moritz von Uslar, Christoph Ransmayr and Josef Bierbichler. In 2019, the Fontane Literature Prize was awarded jointly for the first time by the Fontane City of Neuruppin and the State of Brandenburg. The aim is to support authors of artistic literature every two years who work in Brandenburg and who have already achieved their first literary success. The award is intended to enable talented contemporary authors with their first successful publications to devote themselves to writing for two years. For this purpose, both partners are providing a total of 40,000 euros as a grant over a period of 24 months. The winners are selected by an external jury. The award is announced every two years.

== Recipients ==
- 1994: Sigrid Damm
- 1998: Charlotte Jolles (Special award on the occasion of the Fontane year on the 100th anniversary of Theodor Fontane's death)
- 1999: Günter de Bruyn
- 2004: Friedrich Christian Delius
- 2010: Lutz Seiler for Zeitwaage
- 2012: Moritz von Uslar for Deutschboden. Eine teilnehmende Beobachtung.
- 2014: Christoph Ransmayr for Atlas eines ängstlichen Mannes
- 2016: Josef Bierbichler for Mittelreich
- 2019: Peggy Mädler for Wohin wir gehen
- 2021: Judith Zander for Johnny Ohneland
- 2023: Matthias Nawrat for Gebete für meine Vorfahren
- 2025: Lisa Kränzler for Mariens Käfer
