= Barbara Zoeke =

German writer (died 2024)

Barbara Zoeke (died 7 July 2024) was a German writer. She grew up in Vogtland in Thuringia. She trained as a psychologist, conducted research in the United States, and for many years was on the board of the International Society for Comparative Psychology. She researched and taught at the universities of Münster, Frankfurt, Würzburg and Munich. In addition to her scholarly work, she published narrative prose, poetry and non-fiction. Zoeke lived in Berlin since 2008. She died in July 2024, after a long illness.

== Works ==
Her books include:

- Roloff, Gisbert; Angielczyk, Andrzej; Zoeke, Barbara (2014). Anleitung für Simulanten : Reiseführer ins Schummelland (in German). Mankau Verlag. ISBN 978-3-86374-153-2. OCLC 958579278.
- Zoeke, Barbara (2008). Wasserstände Gedichte (in German). Hockenheim. ISBN 978-3-934960-71-8. OCLC 318215217.
- Zoeke, Barbara; Henkel, Lars (2017). Die Stunde der Spezialisten : Roman (in German). Berlin. ISBN 978-3-8477-0393-8. OCLC 1004323238. (winner of the Brothers Grimm Prize of the City of Hanau, 2017)

=== Dissertation ===
- Zoeke, Barbara (1975). Kategorialleistungen von Haustauben : ein vergleichend-experimenteller Beitr. z. Genese u. Dynamik von Bezugssystemen (in German). Meisenheim (am Glan): Hain. ISBN 3-445-01200-8. OCLC 1528812.
