= Judith Zander =

German poet and translator (born 1980)

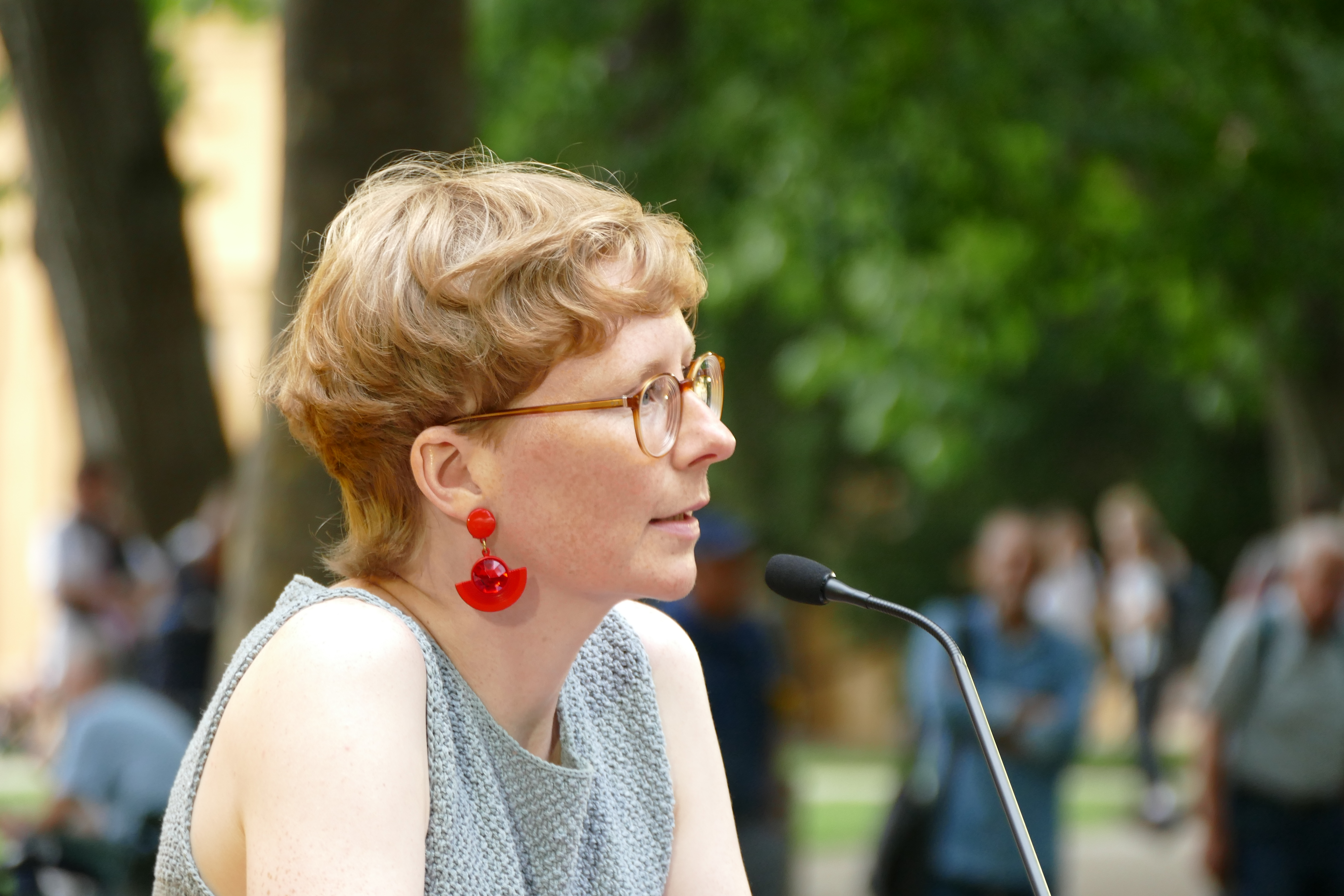
- Judith Zander at the Erlanger Poetenfest
- Born: 13 November 1980 (age 45); Anklam, East Germany
- Occupations: Writer, literary translator
- Writing career
- Genre: Poetry

Judith Zander (born 13 November 1980) is a German writer and translator.

== Life ==
Zander studied German and English studies as well as History in Greifswald. Subsequently, she studied creative writing at the German Institute for Literature in Leipzig. She works as a translator and has translated several books by Sylvia Plath, among others. Her own writing includes prose and poetry. For her debut novel, Zander was nominated for the German Book Prize in 2010. Her work has won her numerous awards. For her poetry collection, im ländchen sommer im winter zur see (In the Countryside Summer in Winter at Sea), she won the Peter Huchel Prize in 2023. She is a member of the PEN Centre Germany.

Zander lives in Jüterbog.

== Works ==
- Dinge, die wir heute sagten. Roman. dtv, München 2010, ISBN 978-3-423-24794-8.
- oder tau. Gedichte. dtv, München 2011, ISBN 978-3-423-24862-4.
- manual numerale. Gedichte. dtv, München 2014, ISBN 978-3-423-26004-6.
- Cactaceae. Sachbuch. With photographies by Johanna Ruebel. Matthes & Seitz (= Naturkunden, Vol. 14), Berlin 2014, ISBN 978-3-95757-029-1.
- Wanderungen. Literarische Erkundungen auf den Spuren von Theodor Fontane. Essays. In collaboration with Thomas Hettche and Ingo Schulze. With drawings by Matthias Beckmann. Edition Stiftung St. Matthäus, Berlin 2019, ISBN 978-3-944007-09-0
- Johnny Ohneland. Roman. dtv, München 2020, ISBN 978-3-423-28235-2.
- im ländchen sommer im winter zur see. Gedichte und Fotografien. dtv, München 2022, ISBN 978-3-423-29010-4.

== Translations ==
- Bob Hicok: Umstellung auf Rehzeit. Gedichte. Luxbooks, Wiesbaden 2013, ISBN 978-3-939557-47-0.
- Sylvia Plath: Der Koloss. Gedichte. Suhrkamp, Berlin 2013, ISBN 978-3-518-42380-6.
- Sylvia Plath: Über das Wasser/Crossing the Water. Nachgelassene Gedichte/Posthumous Poems. Bilingual edition. Luxbooks, Wiesbaden 2013, ISBN 978-3-939557-29-6.
- Maya Angelou: Phänomenale Frauen. Gedichte. Zweisprachig. Suhrkamp, Berlin 2020, ISBN 978-3-518-47098-5.
- Sylvia Plath: Das Herz steht nicht still. Späte Gedichte 1960–1963. Bilingual edition. Suhrkamp, Berlin 2022, ISBN 978-3-518-22541-7.

== Awards ==
- 2007: Poetry Prize at the 15th open mike competition of the Literaturwerkstatt Berlin
- 2009: Wolfgang Weyrauch Prize at the Literarischer März competition in Darmstadt
- 2010: Prize of the Sinecure Landsdorf for her novel, Dinge, die wir heute sagten (Things we said today)
- 2010: 3sat Prize at the Festival of German-Language Literature for an excerpt of her novel Dinge, die wir heute sagten (Things we said today)
- 2011: Uwe Johnson Prize (advancement award) of the Mecklenburg Literature Society
- 2015: Poetry Prize of the Kulturkreis der deutschen Wirtschaft
- 2017: Anke Bennholdt-Thomsen Poetry Prize of the German Schiller Foundation
- 2021: Fontane Prize of the City of Neuruppin for her novel Johnny Ohneland (Johnny Lackland)
- 2023: Peter Huchel Prize for her poetry collection, im ländchen sommer im winter zur see (In the Countryside Summer in Winter at Sea)
