= Friedrich Christian Delius =

German writer (1943–2022)

F.C. Delius
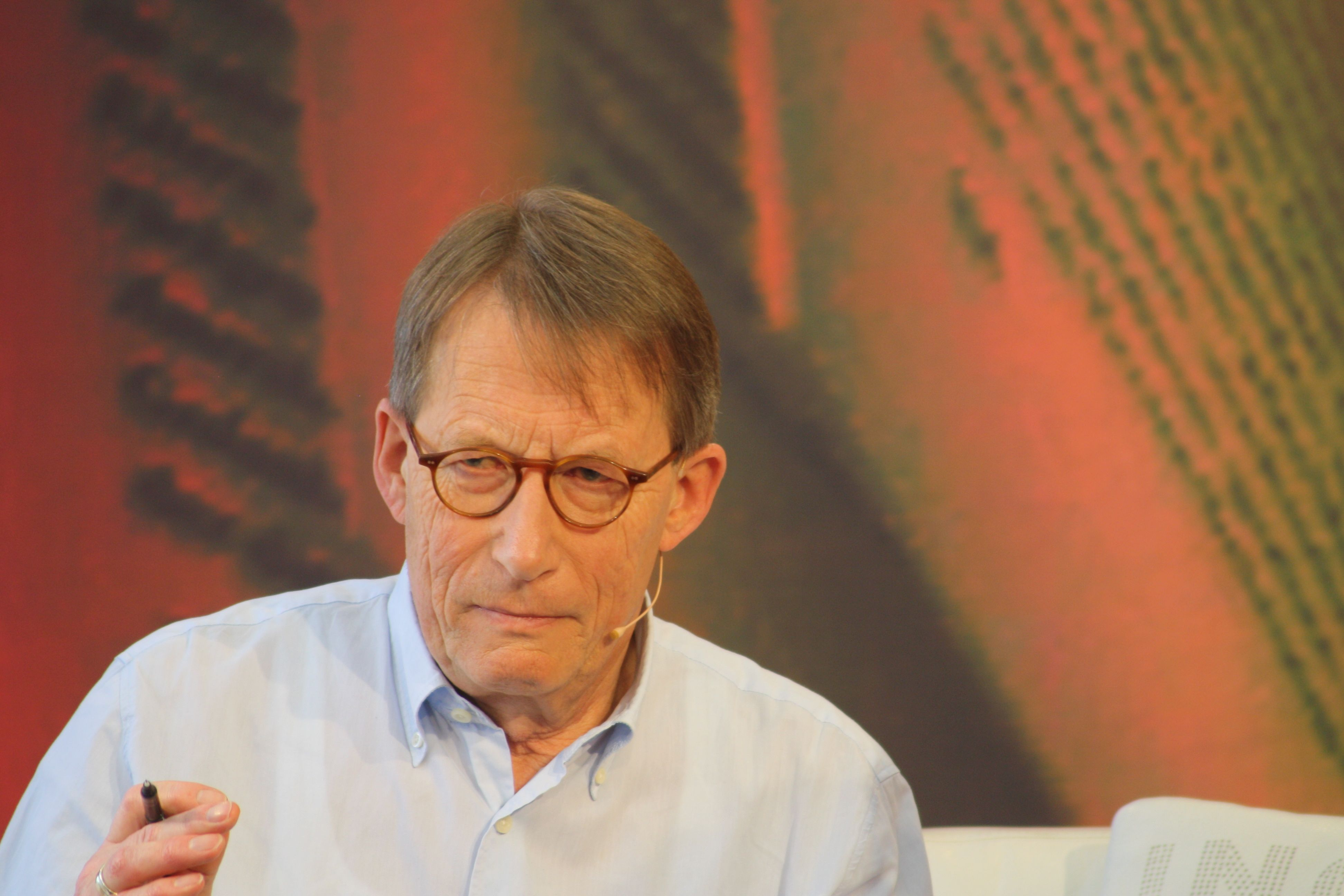
- Delius in 2012
- Born: Friedrich Christian Delius; 13 February 1943; Rome, Italy
- Died: 30 May 2022 (aged 79); Berlin, Germany
- Education: Free University of Berlin; Technische Universität Berlin
- Occupations: Writer, poet
- Writing career
- Years active: 1966–2022
- Genres: Novels, short stories, essays, poetry
- Notable awards: Georg Büchner Prize; Joseph-Breitbach-Preis
- Website: fcdelius.de

Signature
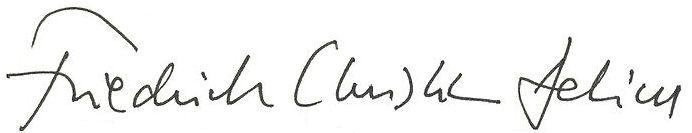

Friedrich Christian Delius (13 February 1943 – 30 May 2022), also known by his pen name F.C. Delius, was a German novelist, short story and non-fiction writer and poet. He wrote books about historic events, such as the 1954 FIFA World Cup, and RAF terrorism. Four of his novels were translated into English, including The Pears of Ribbeck and Portrait of the Mother as a Young Woman. His awards include the Georg Büchner Prize of 2011.

== Biography ==
Delius was born in Rome, where his father was pastor of the German Protestant Church. He grew up in Wehrda (since 1971 among the constituent communities of Haunetal) and Korbach in the state of Hesse. He studied German literature at the Free University of Berlin and at Technische Universität Berlin, and in London. He published poetry beginning at age 18, and appeared at the last meetings of the Gruppe 47 at age 21, as the second-youngest participant.

He first worked in publishing firms such as Klaus Wagenbach and Rotbuch. The Siemens group went to court against the 1972 documentary satire Unsere Siemens-Welt.

From 1978, Delius worked as a freelance writer. He published more than a dozen novels and a number of poetry collections. His novels and stories deal with the history of the 20th century. His work has been translated into more than 20 languages.

He was awarded numerous German literary prizes, including the Fontane Prize of the City of Neuruppin in 2004, the Joseph Breitbach Prize, the Georg Büchner Prize in 2011, and the Critics Prize. He was a member of the Freie Akademie der Künste Hamburg, the Deutsche Akademie für Sprache und Dichtung and the Academy of Arts, Berlin. In 2022, he left the PEN Centre Germany after 50 years of membership. Delius received the Order of Merit of the Federal Republic of Germany in 2017.

In the citation for the 2011 Büchner Prize, Delius was described as a "critical, resourceful and inventive observer" ("kritischer, findiger und erfinderischer Beobachter") who dealt with Germans in the 20th century "from the prehistory of the Nazi era to the time of partition and the immediate present" ("von der Vorgeschichte der NS-Zeit über die Zeit der Teilung bis in die unmittelbare Gegenwart").

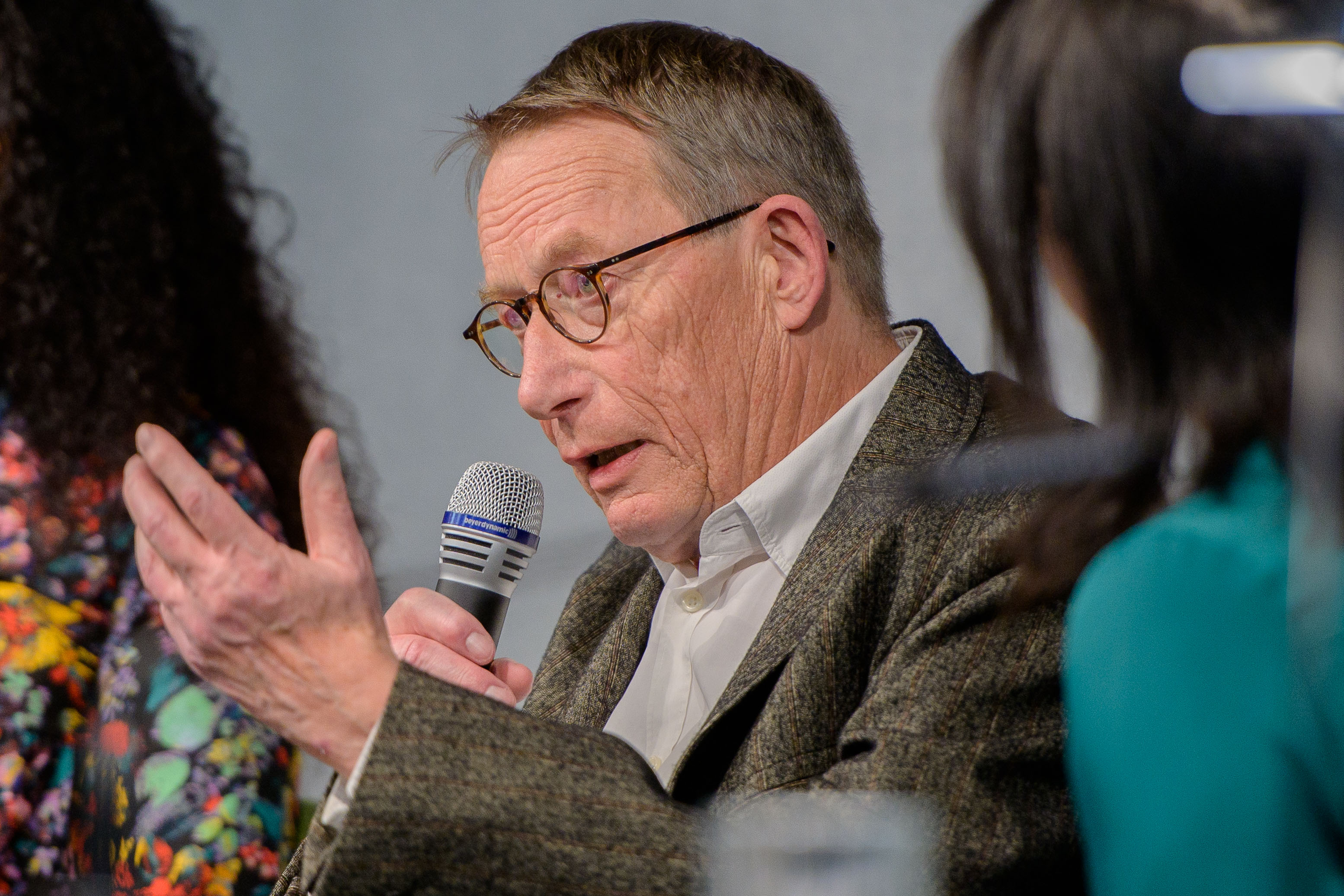
Delius in 2019

Delius was married twice; he and his first wife, Gisela Klann-Delius, had two daughters. Since the late 1970s, he divided his time between Berlin and Rome.

Delius died on 30 May 2022 in Berlin, at the age of 79.

== Work ==
Delius published more than 35 books. Der Spaziergang von Rostock nach Syrakus (The stroll from Rostock to Syracuse) is a 1995 story with a protagonist from East Germany who dreams of walking to Italy like Johann Gottfried Seume in the 19th century. In Der Sonntag, an dem ich Weltmeister wurde, he wrote about the German victory in association football at the 1954 FIFA World Cup, and his Deutscher Herbst trilogy was about the RAF terrorism. The 1968 student protests were the background for Amerikahaus oder der Tanz der Frauen (America house or the dance of the women).

=== Novels in English translation ===
- 1991 Die Birnen von Ribbeck (The Pears of Ribbeck)
- 1994 Der Sonntag, an dem ich Weltmeister wurde (The Sunday I Became World Champion) in Three Contemporary German Novellas
- 2006 Bildnis der Mutter als junge Frau (Portrait of the Mother as a Young Woman)
- 2013 Die linke Hand des Papstes (The Pope's Left Hand)
