= August von Platen-Hallermünde =

German poet and dramatist (1796–1835)

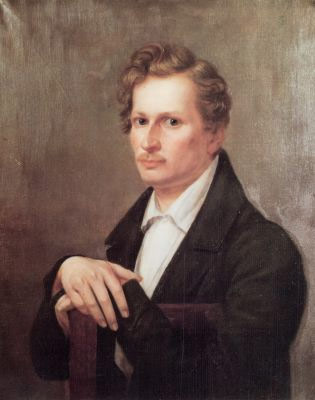
- Born: 24 October 1796; Ansbach, Holy Roman Empire
- Died: 5 December 1835 (aged 39); Syracuse, Sicily, Kingdom of the Two Sicilies
- Resting place: Museo archeologico regionale Paolo Orsi
- Occupations: poet and dramatist

Karl August Georg Maximilian Graf von Platen-Hallermünde (24 October 1796 – 5 December 1835) was a German poet and dramatist. In German he is mostly called Graf Platen.

== Biography ==
August von Platen was born on 24 October 1796 at Ansbach, the son of the Oberforstmeister (a senior public servant) of that state, Count Philipp August von Platen-Hallermünde, by second wife Baroness Christiane Eichler von Auriz. Shortly after his birth Ansbach and other Franconian principalities became incorporated with Bavaria. Platen entered the school of cadets (Kadettenhaus) in Munich, Bavaria, where he showed early poetic talent. In 1810 as an adolescent he passed into the royal school of pages (Königliche Pagerie).

In 1814, Platen was appointed lieutenant in the regiment of Bavarian life-guards. With them he took part in the short campaign in France of 1815, being in bivouac for several months near Mannheim and in the department of the Yonne. He saw no fighting, however, and returned home with his regiment towards the close of the same year. Desiring to study, and finding garrison life distasteful, he obtained a long leave of absence, and after a tour in Switzerland and the Bavarian Alps, entered the University of Würzburg in 1818 as a student of philosophy and philology. In the following year Platen migrated to the university of Erlangen, where he sat at the feet of Schelling, and became one of his most enthusiastic admirers.

As a result of his Oriental studies Platen published a little volume of poems—Ghaselen (1821), each consisting of ten to twenty verses, in which he imitates the style of Rückert; Lyrische Blätter (1821); Spiegel des Hafis (1822); Vermischte Schriften (1822); and Neue Ghaselen (1823). These attracted the attention of eminent men of letters among them Goethe, both by reason of their contents, which breathe the spirit of the East, and also of the purity and elegance of their form and diction.

Though Platen was at first influenced by the school of Romanticism, and particularly by Spanish models, the plays written during his university life at Erlangen, Der gläserne Pantoffel, Der Schatz des Rhampsinit, Berengar, Treue um Treue, Der Turm mit sieben Pforten, show a clearness of plot and expression foreign to the Romantic style. His antagonism to the literature of his day became more and more pronounced, and he vented his indignation at the lack of art shown by the later Romanticists, the inanity of the lyricists, and the bad taste of the so-called fate tragedies (Schicksalstragödien), in the witty Aristophanic comedies Die verhängnißvolle Gabel (1826) and Der romantische Oedipus (1828).

The want of interest, amounting even to hostility, with which Platen's enthusiasm for the purity and dignity of poetry was received in many literary circles in Germany increased the poet's indignation and disgust. In 1826, he visited Italy, which he henceforth made his home, living at Florence, Rome and Naples. His means were slender, but, though frequently necessitous, he felt happy in the life he had chosen, that of a "wandering rhapsodist".

Offended by Heinrich Heine's mockery of "die Orientsucht"—the obsession with the Orient in poetry—in his work Reisebilder, zweiter Teil (1827), Platen expressed anti-Semitic sentiment directed at Heine in his work Der romantische Oedipus (1828). Heine reacted in turn by publicizing Platen's homosexuality in Reisebilder dritter Teil (1830). This back and forth of mockery and ad hominem attacks are also referred to as "die von Platen Affaire".

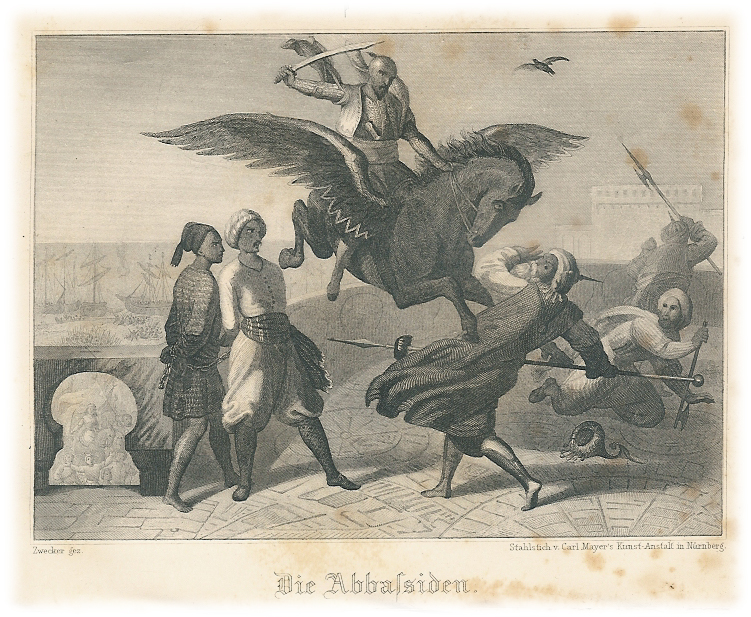
Illustration for Die Abbassiden. From Gesammelte Werke, dritter Band. 1853.

In Naples, where Platen formed the friendship of August Kopisch, the poet and painter, were written his last drama Die Liga von Cambrai (1833) and the delightful epic fairy-tale Die Abbassiden (1830; 1834), besides numerous lyrical poems, odes and ballads. He also essayed historical work in a fragment, Geschichte des Königreichs Neapel von 1414 bis 1443 (1838), without, however, achieving any marked success.

In 1832, his father died, and after an absence of eight years Platen returned to Germany for a while, and in the winter of 1832–1833 lived at Munich, where he revised the first complete edition of his poems, Gedichte (1833).

In the summer of 1834, Platen returned to Italy, and, after living in Florence and Naples, proceeded in 1835 to Sicily. Dread of the cholera, which was at that time very prevalent, induced him to move from place to place, and in November of that year he was taken ill at Syracuse, where he died on 5 December 1835.

According to the Encyclopædia Britannica Eleventh Edition, "Like Heine himself, Platen failed in the drama, but his odes and sonnets, to which must be added his Polenlieder (1831), in which he gives vent to his warm sympathy for the Poles in their rising against the rule of the Tsar, are in language and metre so artistically finished as to rank among the best classical poems of modern times". He gives his name to the Bavarian literary prize August-Graf-von-Platen-Preis.

== Bibliography ==
- A. von Platen, Gesammelte Werke (i.e. Collected works) (1839).
- A convenient edition is that edited by Karl Goedeke in Cotta's Bibliothek der Weltliteratur (4 vols., 1882).
- A. von Platen, Platens Werke, ed. G.A. Wolff, D. Schweizer (1895)
- A. von Platen, Tagebuch (1796–1825), published in its entirety by Georg von Laubmann and L. von Scheffler (2 vols., 1896–1900).
- A. von Platen, Gedichte, ed. H. Henel (1968)
- A. von Platen, Tagebücher, ed. R. Gorner (1990)

== Translations ==
- A. von Platen, The Sonnets, tr. R. Bancroft (1923)
- A. von Platen, Selected Poems, tr. E. Morgen (1978)
- A. von Platen, Farbenstäubchen auf der Schwinge, tr. Translations of Dead German Poets (2013)
