= Nora-Eugenie Gomringer =

German and Swiss poet and writer (born 1980)

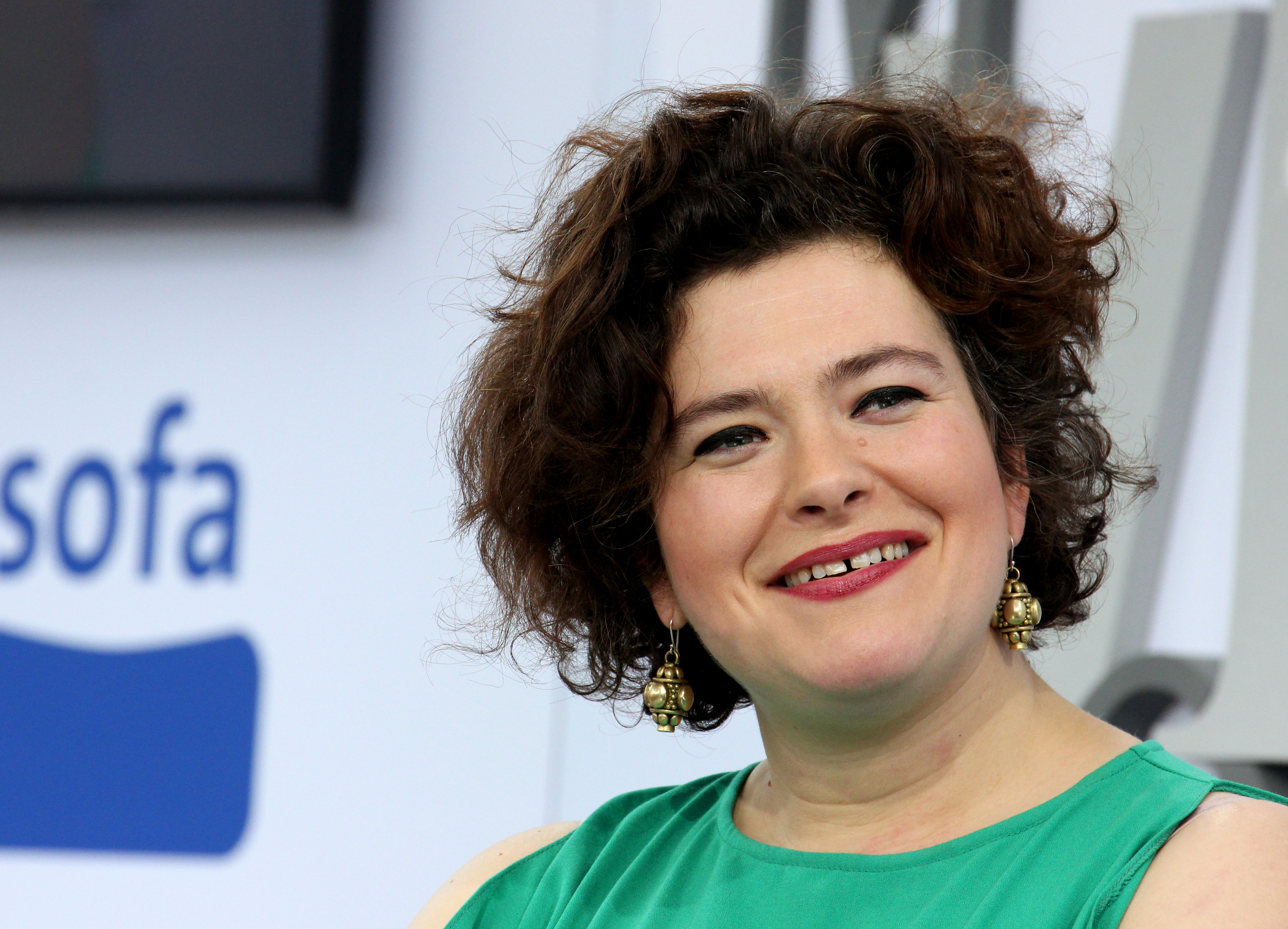
- Born: 26 January 1980 (age 46)
- Education: University of Bamberg
- Occupation: Arts administrator
- Writing career
- Language: German
- Genre: Poetry

Nora-Eugenie Gomringer, known as Nora Gomringer (born 26 January 1980), is a German and Swiss poet and writer. She has won a number of awards, including the 2013 Literaturpreis des Kulturkreises der deutschen Wirtschaft, the 2015 Ingeborg-Bachmann-Preis and the Carl Zuckmayer Medal by Rhineland-Palatinate.

She lives in Bamberg, where she has been directing the International House of Artists Villa Concordia, a cultural institution founded by the State of Bavaria, since 2010. Her mostly lyrical work appears under the name Nora Gomringer, published by Voland & Quist. Hydra's Heads, a collection of her work translated into English by Annie Rutherford, appeared with Burning Eye Books in 2018.

== Life ==
Gomringer's parents were Nortrud Gomringer (1941–2020), and Swiss concrete poet Eugen Gomringer (1925–2025). Born in Neunkirchen, Saar, she was their only daughter, and is the sister of seven half-brothers. She grew up in Wurlitz (Rehau), and moved to Bamberg in 1996.

She achieved an American high school diploma in Lititz, Pennsylvania in 1998, and in 2000 graduated from the Franz-Ludwig-Gymnasium in Bamberg. Gomringer went on to study English studies, German studies and Art history at the Otto-Friedrich University, completing her degree in 2006. She completed internships at the Leo Baeck Institute in New York City (2001 and 2004) and the archive of the Academy of Motion Picture Arts and Sciences, Los Angeles (2000). In April 2010, Gomringer became director of the "Internationales Künstlerhaus Villa Concordia" in Bamberg.

== Poetry ==
Gomringer's first collection of poetry appeared in 2000. Following on from this self-published collection, the publisher Grupello Düsseldorf published hyphenation in 2002. Since 2006, she has been published by the independent publisher Voland & Quist. Her works include over ten volumes of poetry and two books of essays. Her most recent collection is Gottesanbieterin, which appeared in 2020.

She frequently collaborates with musicians and visual artists. The artist Reimar Limmer illustrated the three collections which make up her 'Trilogy of Surfaces and Invisibilities'. Her musical stage partners have included: Günter Baby Sommer, Franz Tröger, Scratch Dee, Michael Stauffer, Word Class Ensemble and DJ Kermit. She performs most frequently with the drummer Philip Scholz.

Her poetry has appeared in English in translations by Annie Rutherford, brought together in Hydra's Heads (Burning Eye Books, 2018). Her volumes of poetry have also been translated into Swedish (translator: Cecilia Hansson), French (translator: Vincent Barras), Belarusian (translator: Volha Hapeyeva), and Spanish (Pablo Jofré). Individual texts and small cycles have been translated into Norwegian, Spanish, American English, Letzeburgische, Dutch, Breton and Persian.

== Opera, video and sound ==
In 2013, Nora Gomringerwrote the libretto for the opera project Three flying minutes, (music by Helga Pogatschar, and director Peter Schelling) which premiered in Basel. Her work is frequently accompanied by small film and video projects, including several filmpoems by Cindy Schmidt. A number of her poetry books have been released with audio CDs.

== Collaboration with Word Class Ensemble ==
Since about 2010, the a cappella ensemble formation Word Class have worked with her texts and used it for settings with and for the active organization of workshops. From 2011 onwards, the five singers worked with Nora Gomringer, together on stage and performed a full-length program. In 2012, the program "Nora Gomringer meets Wortart Ensemble" was invited to the 50th anniversary of the Goethe Institute in Toronto. A tour of the US and Canada and then a tour of Germany followed, and in 2013 an album resulting from this collaboration was produced.

== Poetry Slam ==
In the years 2001–2006, Nora Gomringer was active in the German poetry slam scene, including in the Bamberg Poetry Slam, which she founded in 2001 with Stefankai Spörlein and Keith Kennetz. For several years, the Poetry Slam had its permanent venue in the Morph Club, Bamberg and is managed by the award-winning Slammer and author Christian Ritter.

== Awards ==
- 2012: Joachim Ringelnatz Prize
- 2013: Literaturpreis des Kulturkreises der deutschen Wirtschaft
- 2013: August-Graf-von-Platen-Lyrikpreis
- 2014: Otto-Grau-Kulturpreis
- 2015: Ingeborg-Bachmann-Preis
- 2021: Carl Zuckmayer Medal

== Works ==
=== In English ===
- Hydra's Heads, tr. Annie Rutherford. Burning Eye Books, 2018, ISBN 978-1-911570-44-8

=== In German ===
- Gedichte. 2000
- Silbentrennung: Gedichte, Grupello-Verlag, 2002, ISBN 978-3-933749-78-9
- Sag doch mal was zur Nacht. Book with CD. Voland & Quist, Dresden/Leipzig 2006, ISBN 3-938424-13-3
- Klimaforschung. Book with CD. Voland & Quist, Dresden/Leipzig 2008, ISBN 978-3-938424-32-2
- Nachrichten aus der Luft. Voland & Quist, Dresden/Leipzig 2010, ISBN 978-3-938424-53-7
- Ich werde etwas mit der Sprache machen. Voland & Quist, Dresden/Leipzig 2011, ISBN 978-3-86391-003-7
- Mein Gedicht fragt nicht lange. Book with CD. Voland & Quist, Dresden/Leipzig 2011, ISBN 978-3-86391-004-4
- Monster Poems. With illustrations by Reimar Limmer. Book with CD. Voland & Quist, Dresden/Leipzig 2013, ISBN 978-3-86391-028-0
- Morbus. With illustrations by Reimar Limmer. Book with CD. Voland & Quist, Dresden / Leipzig 2015, ISBN 978-3-863910-97-6
- Mein Gedicht fragt nicht lange reloaded. Book with CD. Voland & Quist, Dresden / Leipzig 2015, ISBN 978-3-86391-108-9
- achduje. Der gesunde Menschenversand, Luzern 2015, ISBN 978-3-03853-013-8
- Ich bin doch nicht hier, um Sie zu amüsieren. Voland & Quist, Dresden / Leipzig 2015, ISBN 978-3-86391-115-7.
- Moden. With illustrations by Reimar Limmer. Book with CD. Voland & Quist, Dresden / Leipzig 2017, ISBN 978-3-863911-69-0
- Gottesanbieterin. Voland & Quist, Berlin / Dresden, 2020, ISBN 978-3-863912-50-5
