= Albin Dötsch =

Austrian politician (1872–1922)

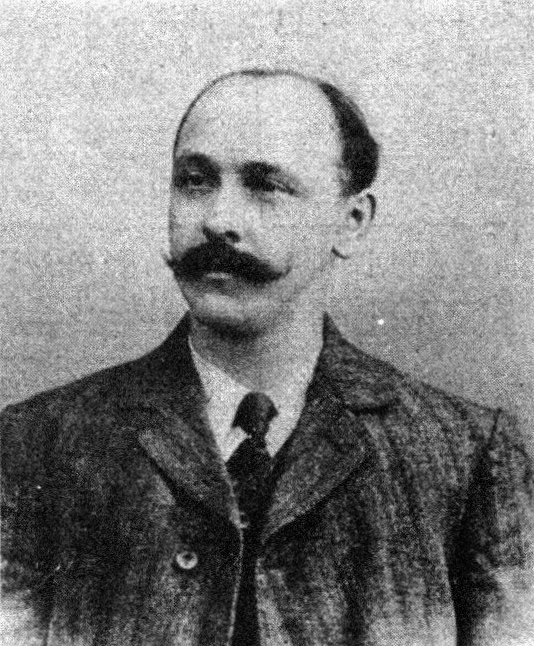

Member of the Imperial Council of Austria
- In office 1907–1918

Personal details
- Born: 27 October 1872 Schönbach, Austria-Hungary
- Died: 17 March 1922 (aged 49) Cheb, Czechoslovakia
- Party: Social Democratic Party of Austria (SPÖ, previously known as SDAPÖ)
- Occupation: Politician

Albin Dötsch (27 October 1872 – 17 March 1922) was an Austro-Hungarian politician, who was a member of the Austrian Imperial Council in the early 20th century, for the Social Democratic Party of Austria (SPÖ, or SDAPÖ at the time).

== Biography ==
Dötsch was a private official.

At the beginning of the century, he was involved in national politics. In the Cisleithanian legislative election of 1907, the first held by universal and equal suffrage, Dötsch won a mandate in the Imperial Council for the constituency of Bohemia. He sat in the parliamentary faction of the Club of the SDAPÖ. Over the same circuit, he also defended his mandate in the elections to the Imperial Council in 1911 and remained in the Vienna parliament until the end of the monarchy.

After World War I, he was, from 1918 to 1919, a member of the Provisional National Assembly of the Republic of German-Austria.

He died of severe illnesses in 1922.
