= August-Graf-von-Platen-Preis =

Bavarian literary prize

August-Graf-von-Platen-Preis is a Bavarian literary prize named after August Graf von Platen (1796–1835).

== Award process ==
The cultural association Speckdrumm e.V. (renamed Kulturforum Ansbach e.V. since 2019) initiates and organizes the award, which is financed by several sponsors including the city of Ansbach. The award is endowed with €5,000 and the sponsorship prize with €1,500. Every two years, the winners are chosen from 10 authors who presented themselves for LeseLust, a reading series that takes place every spring in Ansbach. The authors must write about, have a connection to, be born in, or currently reside in Franconia. The jury consists of the sponsors, the previous prize winner, and a representative from the national press, the University of Erlangen, and the Bavarian Radio.

== Award winners ==
=== Regular Award Winners ===
- 2005: Peter Horst Neumann
- 2007: Hans Wollschläger – Awarded posthumously.
- 2009: Gerhard Falkner
- 2011: Fitzgerald Kusz
- 2013: Nora Gomringer
- 2015: Günther Geltinger
- 2017: Natascha Wodin
- 2019: Joachim Sartorius
- November 7, 2022: Hanns Zischler

=== Scholarship Award Winners ===
- 2009: Christiane Neudecker
- 2011: Christian Schloyer
- 2013: Nataša Dragnić
- 2015: Tessa Müller
- 2019: Gerasimos Bekas
- 2022: Esther Becker – Awarded for her debut novel, "Wie die Gorillas".

=== Special Award Winners ===
- 2017: Thomas Medicus
- June 21, 2021: Ludwig Fels – Awarded posthumously for his outstanding life's work.
