= Perlenbach (Schwesnitz) =

River in Germany

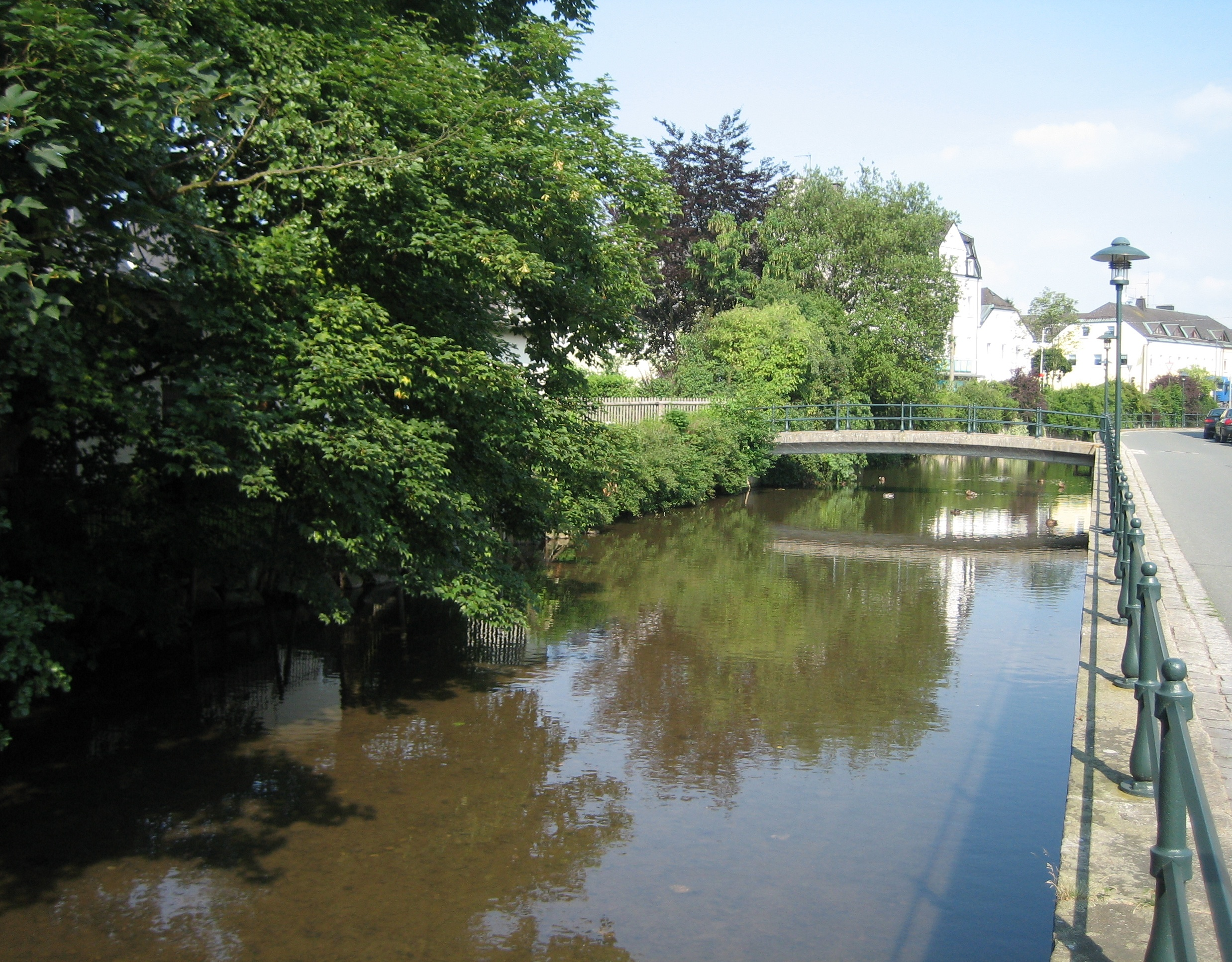
- The Perlenbach in Rehau

Location
- Country: Germany
- State: Bavaria

Physical characteristics
- Mouth
  - location: Schwesnitz
  - coordinates: 50.2491°N 12.0331°E
- Length: 15.3 km (9.5 mi)

Basin features
- Progression: Schwesnitz→ Saale→ Elbe→ North Sea

Perlenbach is a river of Bavaria, Germany. It is the left headstream of the Schwesnitz in Rehau.

== See also ==
- List of rivers of Bavaria
