= Krásná (Cheb District) =

- Municipality
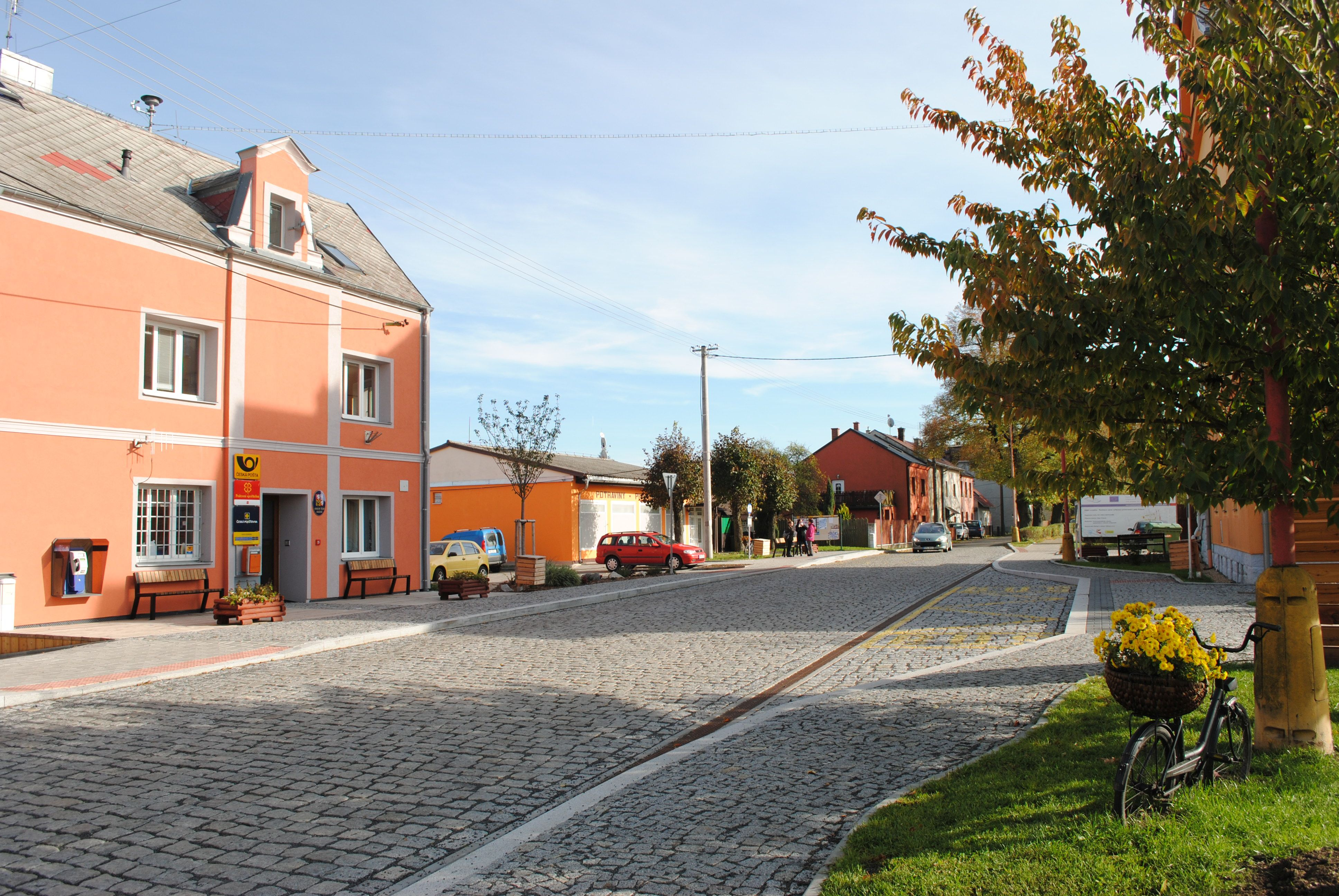
- Main street and the post

- Flag Coat of arms

- Location in the Czech Republic
- Coordinates: 50°14′6″N 12°10′5″E
- Country: Czech Republic
- Region: Karlovy Vary
- District: Cheb
- First mentioned: 1331

Area
  - Total: 21.85 km^{2} (8.44 sq mi)
- Elevation: 643 m (2,110 ft)

Population (2026-01-01)
  - Total: 632
  - Density: 28.9/km^{2} (74.9/sq mi)
- Time zone: UTC+1 (CET)
  - Summer (DST): UTC+2 (CEST)
- Postal code: 351 22
- Website: www.obeckrasna.cz

Krásná (German: Schönbach) is a municipality and village in Cheb District in the Karlovy Vary Region of the Czech Republic. It has about 600 inhabitants. It is the westernmost municipality of the country and in the Slavic-speaking world.

== Administrative division ==
Krásná consists of two municipal parts (in brackets population according to the 2021 census):

- Krásná (518)
- Kamenná (48)

== Etymology ==
Until 1948, the German name Schönbach (meaning 'beautiful stream') was used both in Czech and German. In 1948, it was renamed Krásná (meaning 'beautiful' in Czech).

== Geography ==
Krásná is located about 22 kilometres (14 mi) northwest of Cheb and 49 km (30 mi) west of Karlovy Vary. It lies a salient region call Aš Panhandle, on the border with Germany. The westernmost point of the Czech Republic is located in the municipality, at 50°15′9″N 12°5′26″E.

Krásná is situated in the Fichtel Mountains. The highest point is the hill Štítarský vrch at 716 m (2,349 ft) above sea level. Part of the Czech–German state border is formed by the stream Höllbach (Pekelský potok) and part is formed by its tributary, the stream Mähringgsbach (Úterský potok).

== History ==
The first written mention of Krásná is from 1331 as a property of the Counts of Neuberg. Around 1400, Krásná was bought by the Zedtwitz family. This noble family controlled the whole of the Aš region for almost 500 years.

In 1642 a small castle was built here, but in 1828 it suffered a catastrophic fire. In 1898, a municipal brewery was opened, although it is no longer in use. The castle was torn down in the 1950s.

After World War II, because of the buffer zone, several villages in the municipality (Štítary, Újezd, Elfhausen and Nové Domy) were torn down and became ghost towns.

Between 1976 and 1990, Krásná was one of the municipal parts of Aš, but in 1990, the villages of Krásná and Kamenná separated and created a new municipality.

== Demographics ==
Historical population

Year	Pop.	±%
1869	2,189	—
1880	2,479	+13.2%
1890	2,560	+3.3%
1900	2,993	+16.9%
1910	3,433	+14.7%

Year	Pop.	±%
1921	2,406	−29.9%
1930	3,217	+33.7%
1950	641	−80.1%
1961	617	−3.7%
1970	506	−18.0%

Year	Pop.	±%
1980	446	−11.9%
1991	434	−2.7%
2001	430	−0.9%
2011	507	+17.9%
2021	566	+11.6%

Source: Censuses

== Transport ==
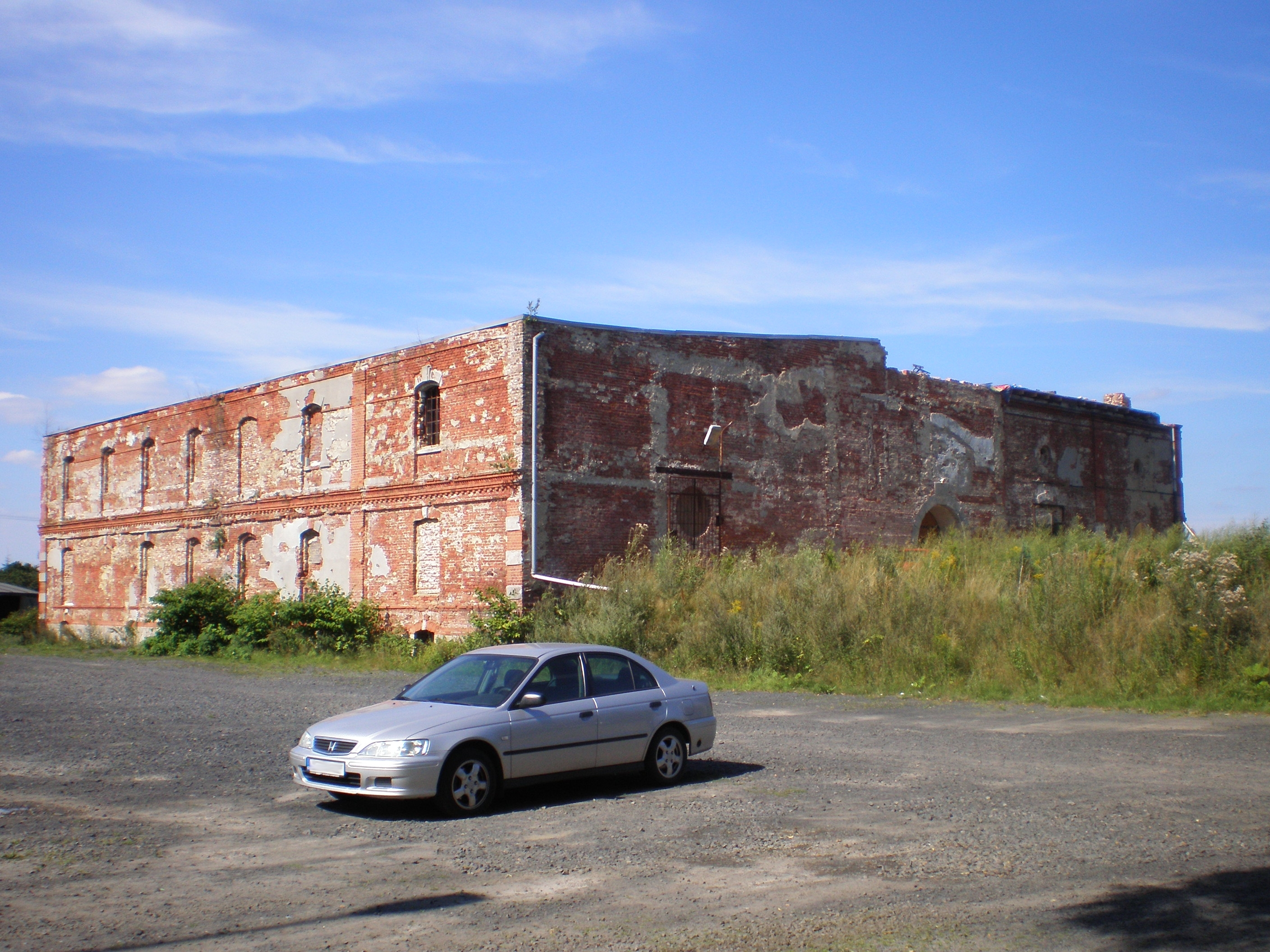
Old brewery

The railway line Aš–Hranice runs through the municipality. Krásná is served by the train station Aš-předměstí, located near the village beyond the municipal border, any by the Štítary stop.

== Sights ==
The only protected cultural monument in the municipality is a rural house from the second half of the 19th century.

== Notable people ==
- Albin Dötsch (1872–1922), Austro-Hungarian politician
