= Literaturpreis des Kulturkreises der deutschen Wirtschaft =

Literaturpreis des Kulturkreises der deutschen Wirtschaft is a literary prize of Germany. It was established in 1951. From 2009 to 2016 the prize was awarded in the prose, poetry, drama and translation categories. Since 2017 the award was renamed to Literaturpreis "Text & Sprache". The prize is endowed with €20,000.

== Winners ==
=== 1953–2006 ===
- 1953 Heinrich Böll
- 1955 Ingeborg Bachmann
- 1957 Paul Celan
- 1958 Günter Grass
- 1967 Thomas Bernhard
- 1971 Elias Canetti
- 1986 Christoph Ransmayr
- 1998 Daniel Kehlmann

=== 2007–2016 ===
| Year | Prose | Drama | Translation | Poetry |
|---|---|---|---|---|
| 2007 | Thomas Stangl | Philipp Löhle | | |
| 2008 | Thomas Steinaecker | Ewald Palmetshofer | | |
| 2009 | Tilman Rammstedt | Juliane Can | | Barbara Köhler |
| 2010 | Glavinic Thomas | Dirk Laucke | Thomas Mohr | |
| 2011 | Anna Katharina Fröhlich | Oliver Kluck | | Armin Senser |
| 2012 | Wolfgang Herrndorf | Wolfram Lotz | Waltraud Hüsmert | |
| 2013 | Clemens J. Setz | Anne Lepper | | Nora Gomringer |
| 2014 | Reinhard Kaiser Mühlecker | Nis-Momme Stockmann | Eveline Passet | |
| 2015 | Nino Haratischwili | Wolfram Höll | | Judith Zander |
| 2016 | Ulla Lenze | Darja Stocker | Claudia Hamm | |

=== Since 2017 ===
| Year | Text & Sprache |
|---|---|
| 2017 | Ulrike Almut Sandig |
| 2018 | Thomas Köck |
| 2019 | Enis Maci |
| 2020 | Maren Kames |
| 2021 | Dorothee Elmiger |
| 2022 | Lena Gorelik |
| 2023 | Lukas Rietzschel |
| 2024 | Dana Vowinckel |
| 2025 | Yevgeniy Breyger |
