= Natascha Wodin =

German writer of Ukrainian origin (born 1945)

Natashcha Wodin
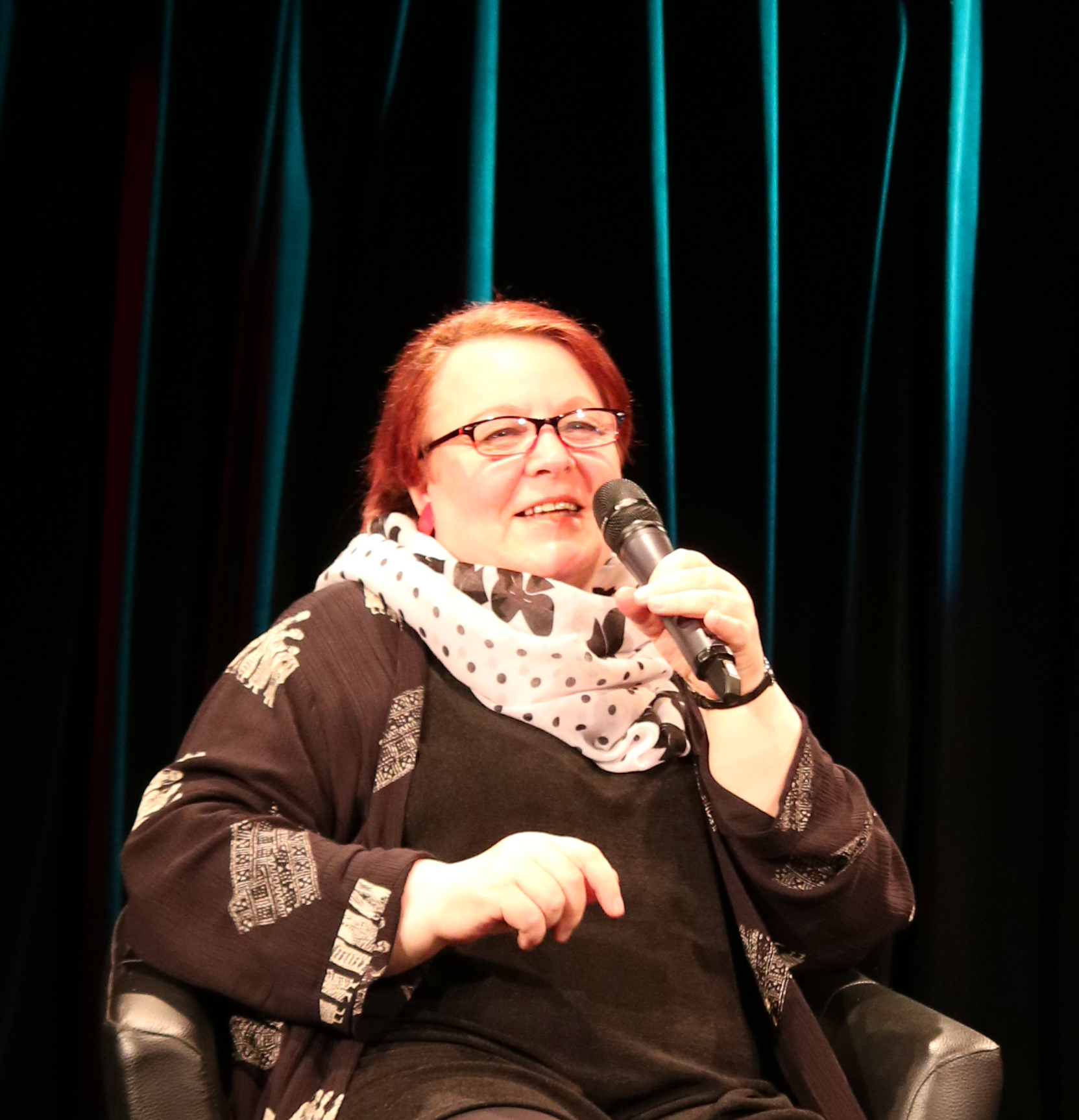
- Natascha Wodin in 2016
- Born: December 8, 1945 (age 79); Fürth
- Notable works: Sie kam aus Mariupol
- Spouse: Wolfgang Hilbig

Natascha Wodin (born 8 December 1945) is a German writer of Ukrainian origin. She was born in Fürth, Bavaria in 1945 to parents who had been forced labourers under the Nazi regime. She grew up in a camp for displaced persons. Following her mother's suicide, she was raised in a Catholic home for girls. She worked as a telephone operator and stenographer before becoming an interpreter and translator of Russian in the early 1970s.

Wodin has translated literary works from Russian into German and has lived in Moscow. She has written novels, short stories and poetry, and has won many prizes, including the Adelbert-von-Chamisso Prize in 1998, the Brothers Grimm Prize of the City of Hanau in 1989 and 2009, the Alfred Döblin Prize in 2015 and the Leipzig Book Fair Prize in 2017 for Sie kam aus Mariupol, one of her best known books. Her book Irgendwo in diesem Dunkel is a memoir of her father.

She was married to the novelist Wolfgang Hilbig, an experience which she recounts in her book Nachtgeschwister. She has lived in Berlin and Mecklenburg since 1984.

== Works ==
- Die gläserne Stadt. Rowohlt, Reinbek 1983. ISBN 3-498-07296-X.
  - Reissue: Die gläserne Stadt. ars vivendi verlag, Cadolzburg 2020. ISBN 978-3-86913-841-1.
- Nadja: Briefe aus Russland. editor, translator and introduction by Natascha Wodin. Nishen, Kreuzberg 1984. ISBN 3-88940-003-5.
- Das Sprachverlies. poems. Rowohlt, Reinbek 1987. ISBN 3-546-49825-9.
- Einmal lebt ich. DTV, München 1989. ISBN 3-423-11575-0.
- Sergej. Griechisches Tagebuch. Büchergilde Gutenberg, 1993. ISBN 978-3-379-00746-7
- Erfindung einer Liebe. Reclam, Leipzig 1993. ISBN 3-379-00745-5.
- Die Ehe. Kiepenheuer, Leipzig 1997. ISBN 3-378-00596-3.
- Das Singen der Fische. Kiepenheuer, Leipzig 2001. ISBN 3-88423-182-0.
- Nachtgeschwister. Kunstmann, München 2009. ISBN 978-3-88897-560-8.
- Alter, fremdes Land. Jung und Jung, Salzburg/Wien 2014. ISBN 978-3-99027-057-8.
- Sie kam aus Mariupol. Rowohlt, Reinbek 2017. ISBN 978-3-498-07389-3.
- Irgendwo in diesem Dunkel. Rowohlt, Reinbek 2018. ISBN 978-3-498-07403-6.
- Nastjas Tränen. Rowohlt Hamburg 2021. ISBN 978-3-498-00260-2.

=== English translations ===
- Wodin, Natascha; Kueppers, Alfred (2022). She came from Mariupol. East Lansing, MI.: Michigan State University Press. ISBN 978-1-60917-690-7. OCLC 1290023039.

== Awards ==
- 1981 Scholarship of the Deutscher Literaturfonds
- 1984 Hermann-Hesse-Preis
- 1984 Kulturförderpreis der Stadt Nürnberg
- 1985 Andreas-Gryphius-Förderpreis
- 1987 Scholarship of the Deutscher Literaturfonds
- 1988 Scholarship of the Deutscher Literaturfonds
- 1988 Scholarship in Künstlerhaus Edenkoben
- 1989 Brothers Grimm Prize of the City of Hanau
- 1990 Scholarship at the Akademie Schloß Solitude
- 1992 Scholarship in Künstlerdorf Schöppingen
- 1998 Adelbert von Chamisso Prize
- 2004 Scholarship of the Stiftung Preussische Seehandlung
- 2005 Wolfram-von-Eschenbach-Preis
- 2006 Ehrengabe der Deutschen Schillerstiftung
- 2009 Brothers Grimm Prize of the City of Hanau
- 2010 Scholarship of the Deutscher Literaturfonds
- 2015 Scholarship of the Deutscher Literaturfonds
- 2015 Alfred Döblin Prize
- 2016 Arbeitsstipendium des Berliner Senats
- 2017 Leipzig Book Fair Prize in the category of fiction
- 2017 August Graf von Platen Prize
- 2019 Hilde-Domin-Preis für Literatur im Exil
- 2021 Gisela-Elsner-Preis
- 2022 Joseph-Breitbach-Preis
