= Anna Mitgutsch =

Austrian writer and educator

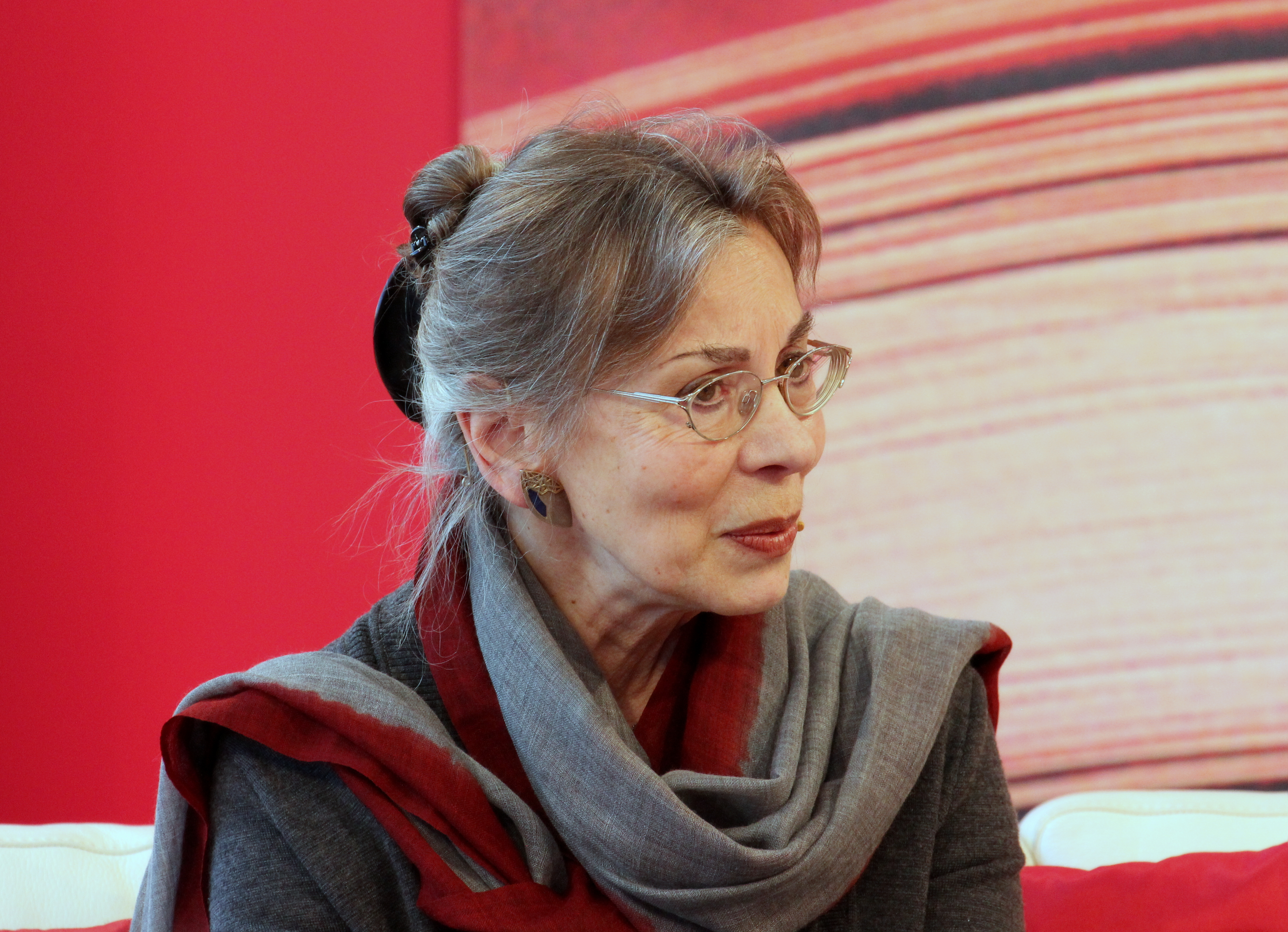
Anna Mitgutsch (2016).

Anna Mitgutsch (born 2 October 1948) is an Austrian writer and educator. Her name also appears as Waltraud Anna Mitgutsch.

== Biography ==
She was born in Linz and studied German and English literature at the University of Salzburg. Originally a Roman Catholic, Mitgutsch converted to Judaism and worked on a kibbutz in Israel. She taught at the Institute for American Studies at the University of Innsbruck and, after going to England, at the University of Hull and University of East Anglia. Next, She taught for a year in Seoul, South Korea and then at colleges and universities in the United States from 1979 until 1985, when Mitgutsch returned to Austria. She lives in Linz and divides her time between that city and Boston.

Her first novel was Three Daughters (Die Züchtigung) (1985), followed by The Other Face (Das andere Gesicht) in 1986. In 1989, she published Exclusion (Ausgrenzung) and, in 1992, In Foreign Cities (In fremden Städten). Her novels deal with individuals facing difficulties in becoming part of a society that is indifferent or antagonistic to them. Her work also explores the connections between the present and the past. Several of her novels have been translated into English. Mitgutsch's novels often make the reader feel uncomfortable.

== Selected works ==
- 1974: Zur Lyrik von Ted Hughes. Diss. Phil., Salzburg.
- 1980: On poets & poetry: second series. With Joseph L. Schneider and Anita Weinzinger. Salzburg.
- 1980: Metamorphical gaps and negation in the poetry of W.S. Merwin, Mark Strand and Charles Simic. The immigrant experience in Pnin and Mr. Sammler's planet. With Joseph L. Schneider [u.a.]. Salzburg.
- The image of the female in D. H. Lawrence’s poetry. With James Hoff. Salzburg.
- On poetry & poetry, third series. With James Hoff, Salzburg.
- Die Züchtigung. Roman. Düsseldorf (Claassen), 1985; dtv. ISBN 978-3-423-10798-3
  - 1987: Three daughters. New York, Harcourt Brace Janovanovich. ISBN 978-0-15-175298-0
  - 1988: Punishment. London, Virago. ISBN 978-0-86068-940-9
- 1986: Das andere Gesicht. Roman. Düsseldorf (Claassen); dtv ISBN 978-3-423-13688-4
- 1989: Ausgrenzung. Roman. Frankfurt am Main (Luchterhand) ISBN 978-3-630-86690-1
- 1992: In fremden Städten. Roman. Hamburg (Luchterhand) ISBN 978-3-630-86778-6
  - 1995: In foreign cities. Riverside, Ariadne. ISBN 978-0-929497-90-7
- 1995: Abschied von Jerusalem. Roman. Berlin (Rowohlt Berlin). dtv ISBN 978-3-423-13388-3
  - 1997: Lover, traitor a Jerusalem story. New York (Metropolitan/Holt). ISBN 978-0-8050-4174-3
- 1999: Erinnern und erfinden. Grazer Vorlesungen. Graz (Droschl). ISBN 978-3-854-20521-0
- 2000: Haus der Kindheit. Roman. München (Luchterhand) ISBN 978-3-630-87064-9
  - 2006: House of childhood. New York, Other Press. ISBN 978-1-59051-188-6
- 2003: Familienfest. Roman. München (Luchterhand); btb ISBN 978-3-442-73349-1
- 2007: Zwei Leben und ein Tag. Roman. München (Luchterhand) ISBN 978-3-630-87256-8; btb ISBN 978-3-442-73844-1
- 2010: Wenn du wiederkommst. Roman. München (Luchterhand) ISBN 978-3-641-04345-2; btb ISBN 978-3-442-74202-8
- 2013: Die Grenzen der Sprache. An den Rändern des Schweigens. Essays. In:Unruhe bewahren. Residenz-Verlag (St. Pölten). ISBN 978-3-701-71607-4
- 2013: Die Welt, die Rätsel bleibt. Essays. München (Luchterhand) ISBN 978-3-630-87418-0
- 2016: Die Annäherung. Roman. München (Luchterhand) ISBN 978-3-630-87470-8; btb 2018 ISBN 978-3-442-71591-6
- 2024: Unzustellbare Briefe. Erzählungen. München (Luchterhand) ISBN 978-3-630-87753-2

== Awards ==
- Brüder-Grimm-Preis der Stadt Hanau (1985)
- Cultural Prize of the State of Upper Austria (1986)
- Claassen-Rose Prize (1986)
- Prize of the city of Bozen (1990)
- Anton Wildgans Prize (1992)
- Prize of the Austrian Federal Ministry of Literature and Art (1995)
- Solothurner Literaturpreis (2001)
- Großes Goldenes Ehrenzeichen der Stadt Linz für Verdienste um die Kultur (2019)
- Adalbert Stifter Prize

=== Honorary doctorates ===
- 2015 Honorary doctorate of the University of Salzburg
