= Tiefenbach (Rems) =

River in Baden-Württemberg, Germany

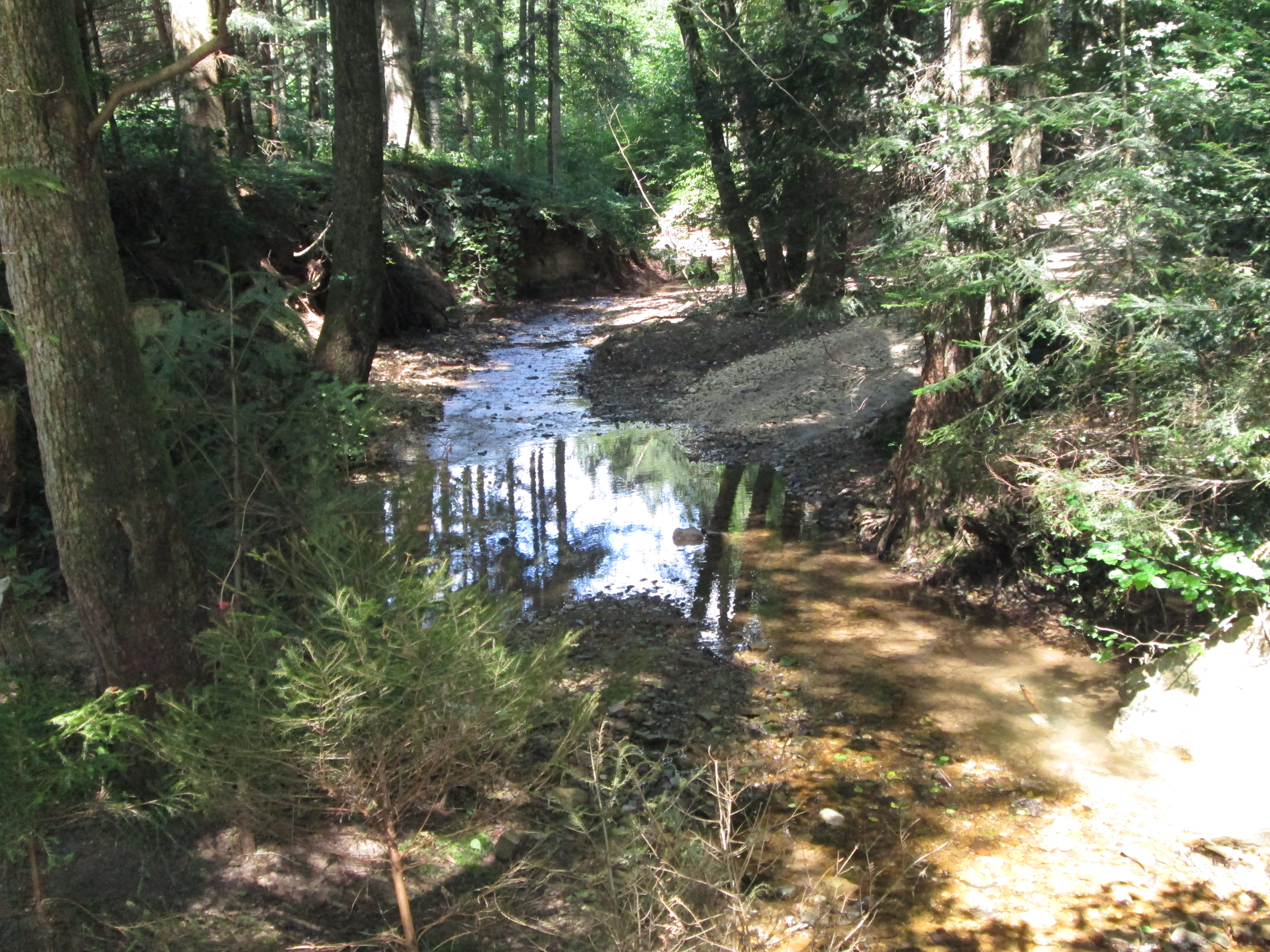

Location
- Country: Germany
- State: Baden-Württemberg

Physical characteristics
- Mouth
  - location: Rems
  - coordinates: 48.7854°N 9.7570°E

Basin features
- Progression: Rems→ Neckar→ Rhine→ North Sea

Tiefenbach (in its upper course: Höllbach) is a small river of Baden-Württemberg, Germany. It flows into the Rems near Schwäbisch Gmünd.

== See also ==
- List of rivers of Baden-Württemberg
