= Wolfgang Hilbig =

German writer and poet

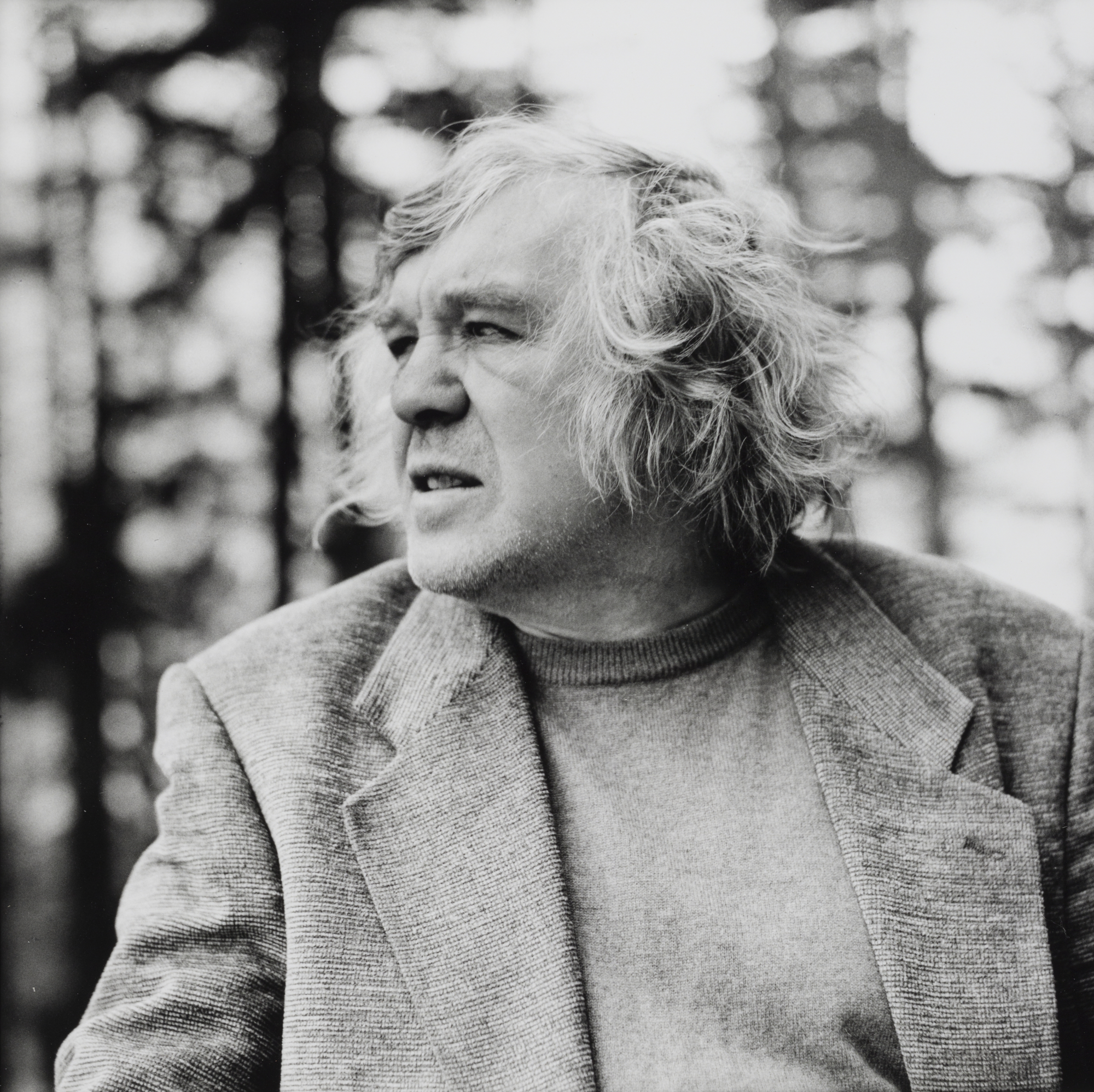
- Wolfgang Hilbig, 1998
- Born: 31 August 1941; Meuselwitz, Germany
- Died: 2 June 2007 (aged 65); Berlin, Germany
- Occupation: writer
- Spouse: Natascha Wodin (m. 1994; div. 2002)

Wolfgang Hilbig (31 August 1941 – 2 June 2007) was a German writer and poet.

== Life ==
Wolfgang Hilbig was born in Meuselwitz, Germany. His grandfather had emigrated from Biłgoraj (Congress Poland, Russian Empire) before the First World War. In 1942, his father was reported missing at Stalingrad, leaving behind Hilbig and his mother.

After his schooling in his home town, Hilbig began to work at a boring mill. Later, after military service, he worked as a tool maker and in assembly construction at the Meuselwitz lignite mine.

In 1978, Hilbig moved to East Berlin, and in 1979 he became an independent writer. In 1985, he left the GDR with a travel visa and moved to West Germany.

He lived in Berlin after the fall of the Berlin Wall and married writer and translator Natascha Wodin in 1994. They had one daughter and divorced in 2002.

Hilbig died from cancer in 2007 and is buried in the Dorotheenstädtischen Cemetery in Berlin.

== Work ==
At first Hilbig favoured poetry, but his works remained widely unpublished in the GDR. He received attention from the West however, as a result of his poems in the anthology Cries for Help from the Other Side (1978). His first volume of poetry, Absence (1979) was published by S. Fischer Verlag in Frankfurt am Main. For this, Hilbig was fined.

At the end of the 1970s, Hilbig gave up his day job and began to work exclusively as a writer. With the support of Franz Fühmann, a few of his poems were printed in a GDR newspaper for the first time. His prose anthology, Unterm Neomond (1982) was published by S. Fischer, followed by Stimme Stimme (1983), a prose and poetry anthology published by Reclam in Leipzig.

In 1985 Hilbig gained a visa for West Germany valid until 1990. During this time he published not only further poetry and prose, but also his first novel, Eine Übertragung (1989), which was received well by literary critics.

Even after reunification, the main themes of his work remained the dual-existence of working and writing in the GDR and the search for individuality. His further works include: his second novel, »Ich« (1993); his novellas and collections of short stories, such as Die Kunde von den Bäumen (1992) and Die Arbeit an den Öfen (1994); and his third novel Das Provisorium (2000). Autobiographical themes are often prevalent.

== Awards ==
- 1983 Hanau Brothers-Grimm-Prize
- 1989 Ingeborg Bachmann Prize for Eine Übertragung
- 1992 Berlin Literature Prize
- 1993 Brandenburg Literature Prize
- 1997 Fontane Prize (the Berlin Academy of Arts)
- 2002 Georg Büchner Prize
- 2002 Walter Bauer Prize
- 2002 Peter Huchel Prize for Poetry
- 2007 Erwin Strittmatter Prize

== Bibliography ==
=== Novels ===
- Eine Übertragung (1989)
- »Ich« (1993). 'I', trans. Isabel Fargo Cole (Seagull Books, 2015).
- Das Provisorium (2000). The Interim, trans. Isabel Fargo Cole (Two Lines Press, 2021).

=== Novellas and short story collections ===
- Unterm Neomond. Erzählungen (1982). Under the Neomoon, trans. Isabel Fargo Cole (Two Lines Press, 2024).
- Der Brief. Drei Erzählungen (1985)
- Die Weiber (1987). The Females, trans. Isabel Fargo Cole (Two Lines Press, 2018).
- Alte Abdeckerei. Erzählung (1991). Old Rendering Plant, trans. Isabel Fargo Cole (Two Lines Press, 2017).
- Die Kunde von den Bäumen (1992). The Tidings of the Trees, trans. Isabel Fargo Cole (Two Lines Press, 2018).
- Grünes grünes Grab. Erzählungen (1993)
- Die Arbeit an den Öfen. Erzählungen (1994)
- Der Schlaf der Gerechten. Erzählungen (2002). The Sleep of the Righteous, trans. Isabel Fargo Cole (Two Lines Press, 2015).

=== Poetry ===
- Abwesenheit (1979)
- Die Versprengung (1986)
- Bilder vom Erzählen (2001)

=== Miscellaneous ===
- Stimme Stimme. Gedichte und Prosa (1983)
- Die Territorien der Seele. Fünf Prosastücke (1986). Territories of the Soul.
- Über den Tonfall. Drei Prosastücke (1990). On Intonation.
- Das Meer in Sachsen. Prosa und Gedichte (1991)
- Zwischen den Paradiesen. Prosa Lyrik (1992)
- Abriß der Kritik. Frankfurter Poetikvorlesungen (1995)
- Sphinx. Texte aus dem Nachlass (2019, posthumous)

=== Selected compilations in German ===
- Aufbrüche. Erzählungen (1992)
- Die Angst vor Beethoven und andere Prosa (1997)
- Erzählungen (2002)

=== Compilations in English ===
- Territories of the Soul / On Intonation, trans. Matthew Spencer (Sublunary Editions, 2024)
