= Rehau Group =

German polymer company

Rehau Verwaltungszentrale AG
- Type: Aktiengesellschaft
- Industry: Polymer Processing
- Founded: 1948
- Headquarters: Muri bei Bern, Switzerland
- Key people: Dr. Veit Wagner (Chairman); Jobst Wagner (Vice-Chairman)
- Revenue: approximately 3 Billion EUR (2025)
- Number of employees: More than 13.000 (2025)
- Website: www.rehau.group

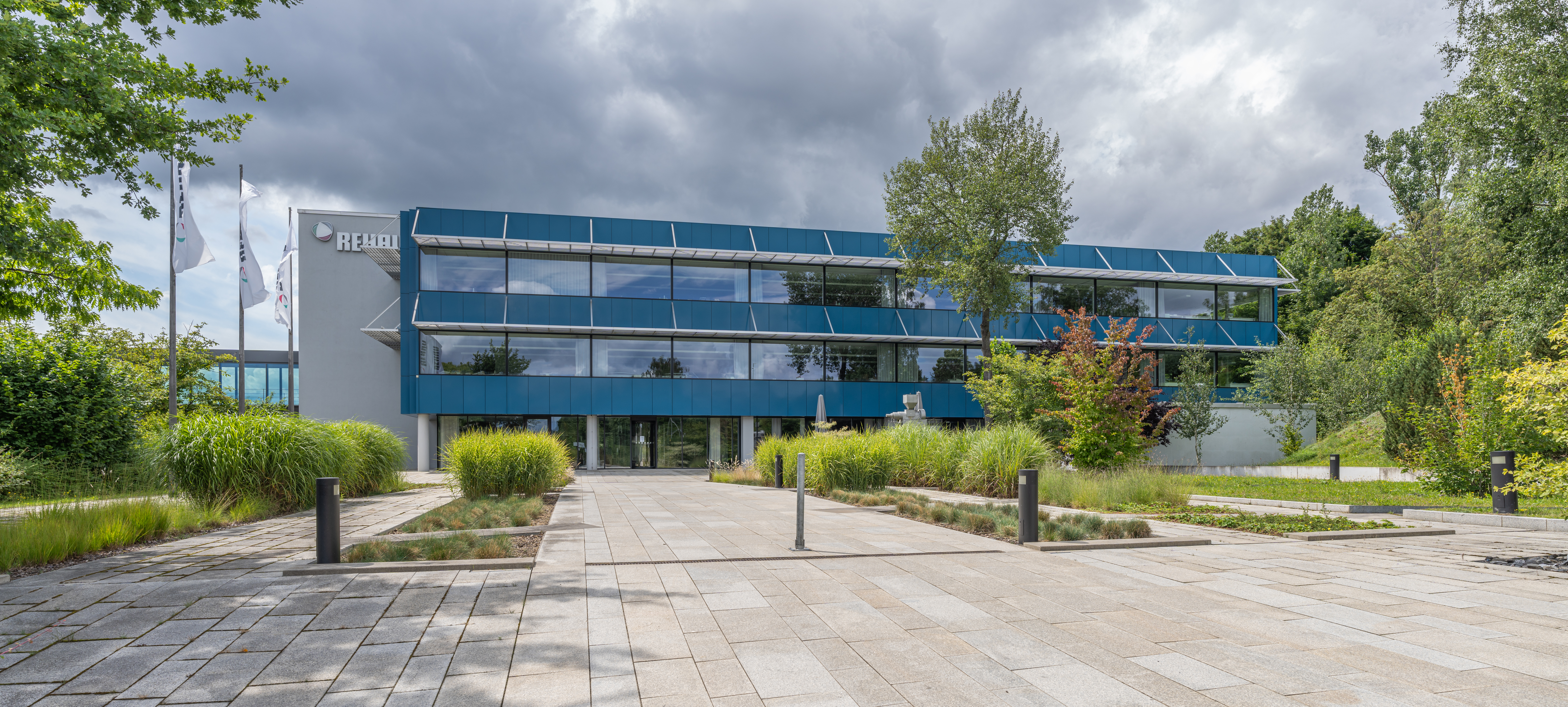
Administration in Rehau (Rheniumhaus), Germany.

REHAU Verwaltungszentrale AG is the parent company of the REHAU Group, a polymer processor with more than 160 locations worldwide.

The REHAU Group comprises REHAU Building Solutions, REHAU Industrial Solutions, REHAU Interior Solutions, the Meraxis Group, RAUMEDIC, REHAU Window Solutions, and the two service units REHAU New Ventures and REHAU Global Business Services.

The turnover of the whole group amounts to approximately 3 billion Euros.

== History ==
Helmut Wagner (1925–2021) founded the company in 1948 in Rehau, Bavaria. On 28 December 1948, the district office of Hof (Saale) granted medical student Helmut Wagner the official permission to establish a small-scale industrial plant for the production of Igelit (a type of plastic). With this approval, the 23-year-old son of a school board official abandoned his studies to produce Keder and plastic hoses. The foundation was extrusion technology. The first production site was an annex of the Fränkische Lederfabrik (Franconian Leather Factory), established in 1907 in Rehau. According to commercial register entries, the fledgling company was financially supported by Helmut’s mother, Christina Wagner, and Elsa Linhardt, daughter of the factory owner. The company’s rise began as a supplier for the VW Beetle, producing running boards and grab handles for drivers and passengers.

In 1949, Wagner renamed his factory Rehau Plastiks.

During this early phase, part of the machinery and equipment was developed and built in-house. Alongside extrusion, other processes such as injection molding and extrusion blow molding were introduced as product development advanced.

New applications for plastic products (e.g., furniture profiles, hoses for industrial and medical technology) were soon explored, sophisticated technical components and systems were developed, and plastic granules were produced in-house through customized formulations and compounding. The material types of the Rehau Group carry the prefix RAU. As the raw materials industry developed new technical polymers, Rehau continuously expanded its range of plastic types.

In addition to two plants in Rehau, the first plant for automotive parts, including bumpers, opened in Feuchtwangen in 1951. In 1958, the first plastic window profile and the first magnetic tape frame for refrigerators were extruded.

In 1962, the first plant outside Europe opened in Montreal, Canada. In the early 1960s, Rehau Plastiks’ headquarters moved to Muri near Bern, Switzerland, centralizing global procurement for 45 plants in 21 countries and group controlling.

At Rehau’s initiative, the profession of plastic molder was introduced in Germany in 1976. During the 1970s, demand for plastic parts surged, which Rehau supported in automotive, furniture, electronics, window, sanitary, heating, building technology, and pipe/hose applications.

In 2000, Helmut’s sons, Jobst Wagner as president and Veit Wagner as vice president, took over the company. In 2021, Jobst Wagner handed the presidency to Veit and moved to the vice presidency.

In 2004, the medical division, with around 200 employees, was spun off into the sister company Raumedic AG. It serves as a development partner and manufacturer for the medical and pharmaceutical industries, with an independent sales network and two production sites (Helmbrechts and Mills River, North Carolina, USA) for extrusion, injection molding, and assembly in cleanrooms. Today, Raumedic employs approximately 1,300 people globally.

In 2018, REHAU Verwaltungszentrale AG (headquartered in Muri bei Bern) acquired the internationally active MB Barter & Trading SA (MBT) from Zug/Steinhausen, with 30 global locations. In 2019, Meraxis was founded as an independent company in Muri, merging Rehau’s procurement division with MBT. Meraxis is now a leading distributor of plastics, handling over €2 billion in volume annually.

At the end of 2021, Rehau AG + Co. restructured its German operations to legally and operationally separate its automotive business. On 8 October 2021, Rehau Management SE was registered, followed by Rehau Industries SE & Co. KG on 15 October 2021. On 4 January 2022, Rehau AG + Co. was renamed Rehau Automotive SE & Co. KG, with Rehau Management SE as the general partner.

In 2024, the Rehau Group and U.S.-based Atlas Holdings agreed to acquire Rehau Automotive, which will merge with supplier SRG Global. The acquisition is pending antitrust approval and is expected to close by Q1 2025. Rehau will retain roughly one-third ownership in the new entity.

In October 2025 the factory in Picardy was closed.

== Locations ==
The REHAU group has more than 160 locations worldwide.
