= Georg von Laubmann =

German philologist and librarian

Georg von Laubmann (3 October 1843 – 5 June 1909) was a German philologist and librarian.

== Biography ==
Von Laubmann was born in Hof, Bavaria. From 1861 to 1866, he studied classical philology at the Ludwig-Maximilians-Universität München and the University of Bonn, and in 1875 was named senior librarian at the university library of the University of Würzburg. From 1882 to 1909, he was director of the Bavarian State Library in Munich.

He received the honorary degree Doctor of Letters (D.Litt.) from the University of Oxford in October 1902, in connection with the tercentenary of the Bodleian Library. He died in Munich.

== Published works ==
- "Catalogus codicum manu scriptorum Bibliothecae Regiae Monacensis", T. I–IV; edited with Karl Felix Halm (1868–1881).
- "L. Caeli Firmiani Lactanti Opera omnia : accedunt carmina eius quae feruntur et L. Caecilii qui inscriptus est De mortibus persecutorum liber", edition of Lactantius; with Samuel Brandt, 2 volumes (1890, 1897).
- "Die Tagebücher des Grafen August von Platen"; edited with Johann Ludwig von Scheffler, 2 volumes (1896, 1900) – The diaries of Count August von Platen.
- "Denkwürdigkeiten des Grafen Maximilian Joseph v. Montgelas über die innere Staatsverwaltung Bayerns (1799–1817)"; edited with Michael Doeberl, (1908) – Memoirs of Count Maximilian von Montgelas on the internal state administration of Bavaria (1799-1817).

Laubmann was also the author of several articles in the "Allgemeine Deutsche Biographie".
