= WirtschaftsBlatt =

- Type: Business newspaper
- Owner: Styria Medien AG
- Publisher: Wirtschaftsblatt Verlag AG
- Editor-in-chief: Wolfgang Unterhuber
- Founded: October 1995
- Ceased publication: 2 September 2016
- Language: German
- Headquarters: Vienna
- Country: Austria
- Circulation: 27,000 (2013)
- OCLC number: 47862186
- Website: www.wirtschaftsblatt.at

WirtschaftsBlatt (meaning The Business Journal in English) was the only daily financial newspaper published in Vienna, the Republic of Austria. The newspaper appeared every trading day from Monday to Friday in German. It was in circulation between October 1995 and September 2016.

== History and profile ==
First published in October 1995, WirtschaftsBlatt specialized in the areas of business, economic policy, markets, stock exchanges and investment. The newspaper was published by around 50 journalists and 30 production staff. On the paper's founding, Styria Multimedia AG and the Swedish media group Bonnier each owned 50% the paper and its online portal. In mid-2006 Styria purchased all of Bonnier's shares and became 100% owner of the newspaper. The publisher of the paper is Wirtschaftsblatt Verlag. The paper was a cooperative of the Austria Press Agency.

WirtschaftsBlatt had its headquarters in Vienna. On 25 January 2007 the online version of the newspaper was launched. On 2 September 2016 the last issue of the paper appeared.

== Content ==
- "Business and Markets": Daily section on business and economic policy in Austria.
- "Bundesländer": Daily report on the business community in the states of Austria.
- "Osteuropa": Daily report on business and economic policy in Eastern and Central Europe.
- "Finance and Securities": Daily Stock, bond, commodity and market analyses
- Special Reports: International Report; service articles on laws, regulations, and taxes; Opinion Page; and every Friday book reviews, careers and real estate.
- Supplements: The Friday edition has supplements "investor", "the magazine for money" and eight times a year a glossy supplement "business daily deluxe" with topics on luxury and lifestyle.

== Circulation ==
WirtschaftsBlatt had a circulation of 53,000 copies in 2004. In 2009, according to Austrian Media Analysis (ÖWA), the newspaper was read by approximately 86,000 (on Fridays 117,000). The average circulation of the paper was 22,024 copies from Mondays to Fridays in 2010. The Austrian Circulation Control (ÖAK) reported that the paper had a circulation of 34,084 in the first half of 2011. Its average circulation was 27,000 copies in 2013.

== Online service ==
On 25 January 2007, the newly designed online wirtschaftsblatt.at was launched. The contents of the portal was based on the WirtschaftsBlatt's line of business. According to Austrian Web Analysis (ÖWA), in 2009 www.wirtschaftsblatt.at had an annual average of 322,000 unique visitors, nearly a million visits and more than three million page views with an average duration of 5:49 minutes.
