= Eugen Gomringer =

Bolivian-born Swiss concrete poet (1925–2025)

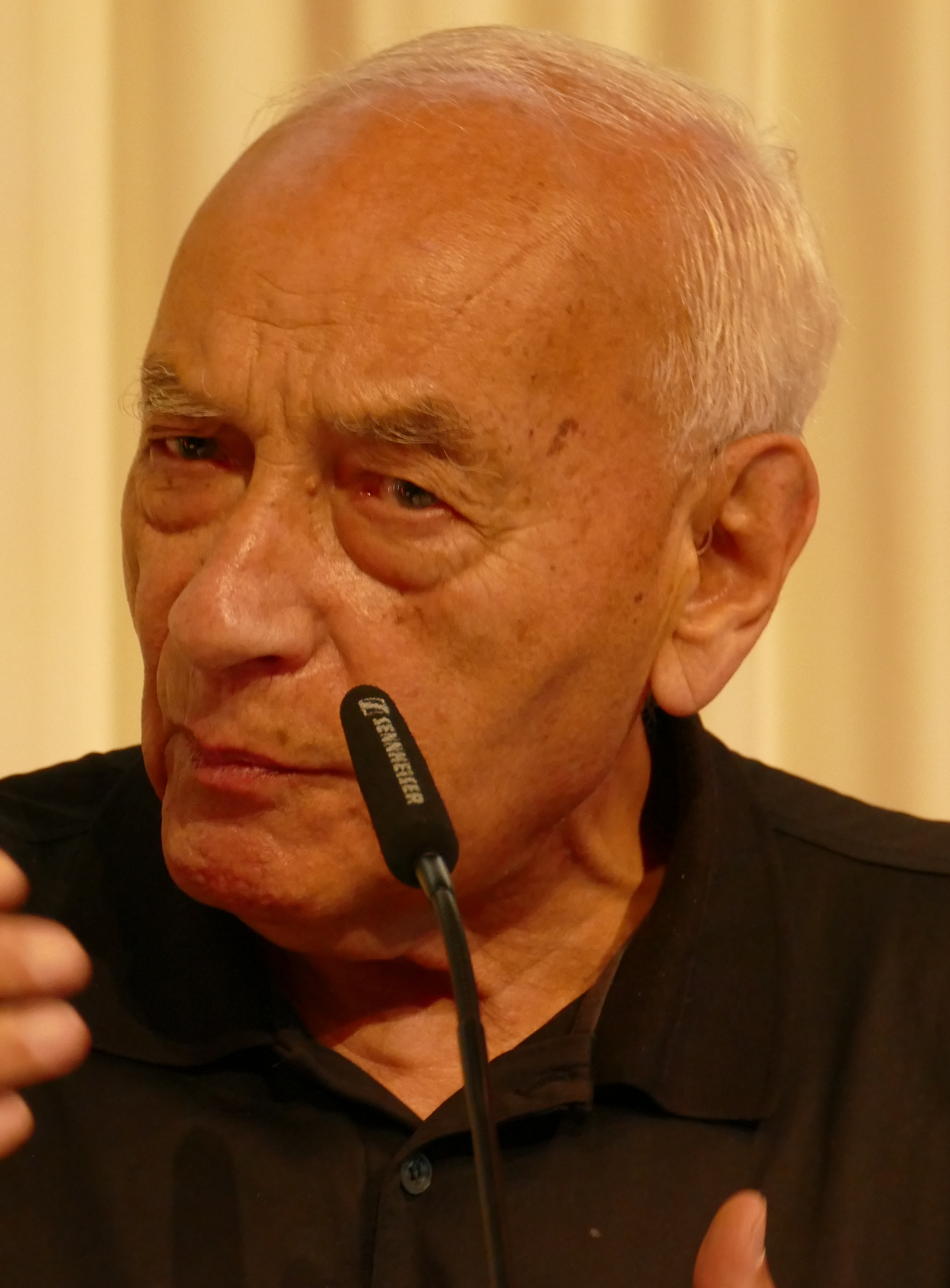
Gomringer in 2018

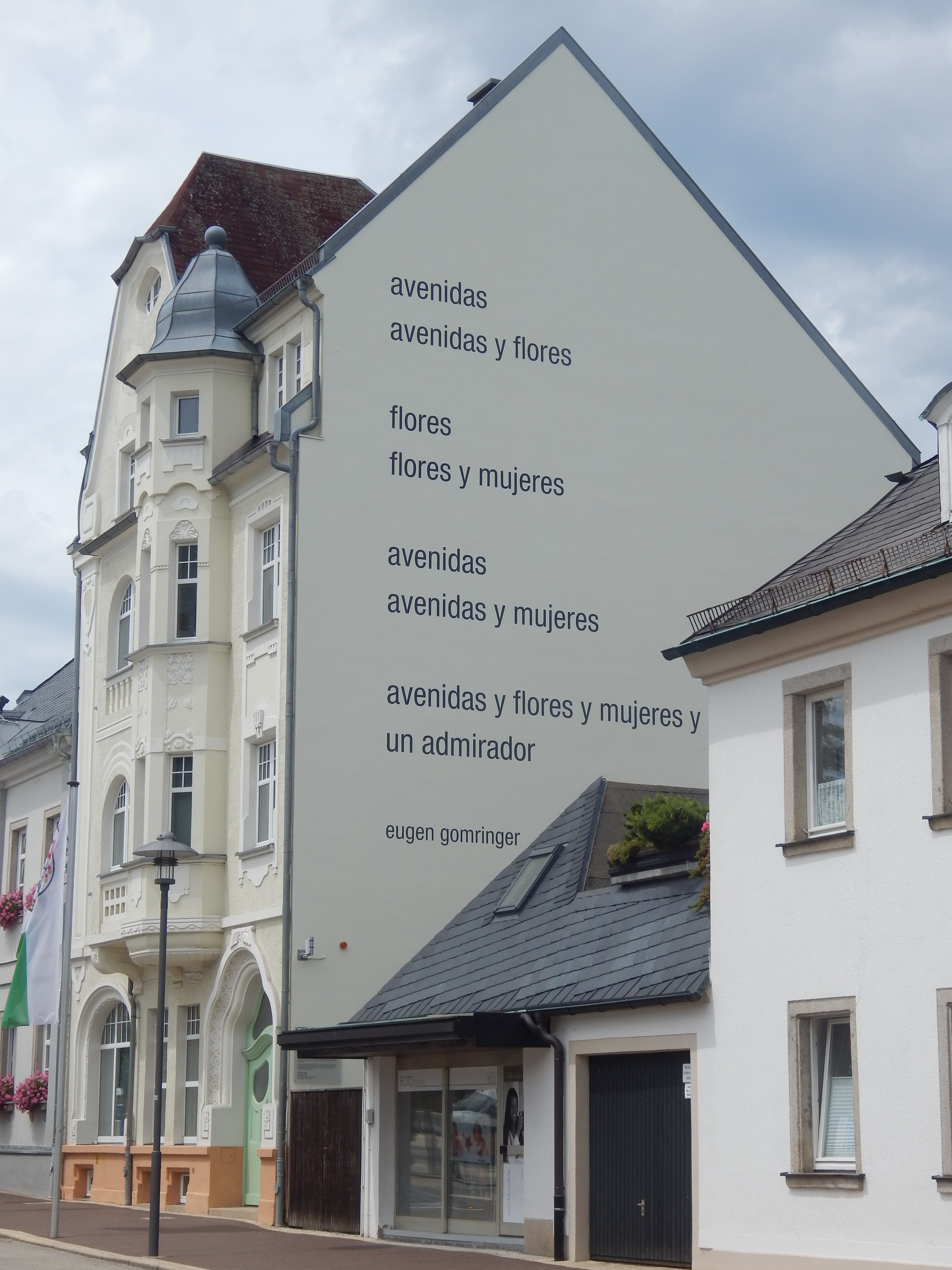
Poem Avenidas y flores y mujeres y un admirador by Gomringer in Rehau

Eugen Gomringer (20 January 1925 – 21 August 2025) was a Bolivian-born Swiss concrete poet. He was head of the Institut für Konstruktive Kunst und Konkrete Poesie (IKKP) in Rehau, Germany. Between 1977 and 1990, he was a professor at the Kunstakademie Düsseldorf, the Arts Academy of the city of Düsseldorf. Gomringer wrote in German, Spanish, French, and English.

== Life and career ==
Eugen Gomringer was born in Cachuela Esperanza, Bolivia on 20 January 1925. He moved to Switzerland, the country his father was from, in the 1940s where he studied artistic and literary history at the University of Bern. His first volume of poetry, "konstellationen constellations constelaciones," was published in 1953. He co-published Edwin Morgan's first full collection of concrete poetry, Starryveldt, in 1965. In 1981 Gomringer sold his private art collection to the City of Ingolstadt, which subsequently in 1992 opened the Museum of Concrete Art.

From 1977 to 1990, he taught as a professor of aesthetic theory in Düsseldorf. His most famous poem "Avenidas" was displayed at Alice Salomon University of Applied Sciences Berlin until it was taken down due to people finding it discriminatory to women. It was moved to a building wall in Rehau in 2018.

In January 2025, Gomringer turned 100. The city of Rehau opened an exhibition featuring 100 of his various works. He died in Bamberg on 21 August 2025.

The German and Swiss poet and writer Nora Gomringer is his daughter.
