= Nino Haratischwili =

Georgian-German novelist, playwright and theater director

Nino Haratischwili ნინო ხარატიშვილი
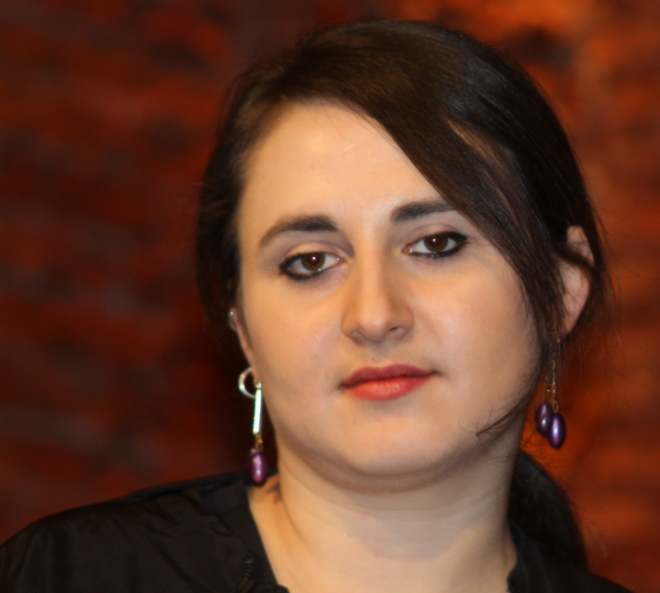
- Haratischwili in 2010
- Born: 8 June 1983 (age 43); Tbilisi, Georgia
- Occupations: Novelist, Playwright, Theater Director
- Writing career
- Period: 2006–present

Nino Haratischwili (Georgian: ნინო ხარატიშვილი; born 8 June 1983) is a Georgian-born German novelist, playwright, and theater director. She has received numerous awards, including the Adelbert von Chamisso Prize, the Kranichsteiner Literaturpreis, and the Literaturpreis des Kulturkreises der deutschen Wirtschaft.

Haratischwili was born and raised in Tbilisi, Georgia, where she attended a German-language school. To escape the political and social chaos that followed the collapse of the Soviet Union, she moved to Germany for two years in the early 1990s with her mother, where she attended the seventh and the eighth grade of school. Her family returned to Georgia afterwards. Haratischwili later moved to Germany again in order to attend drama school in Hamburg. After working as a theater director in Hamburg for several years, she published her first book, Juja, in 2010. She became a German citizen in 2012.

Haratischwili currently lives in Hamburg.

== Bibliography ==
- Der Cousin und Bekina (The Cousin and Bekina), Katzengraben-Presse, 2001, ISBN 3-910178-36-7.
- Georgia / Liv Stein. Zwei Stücke (Georgia / Liv Stein / Two Plays), Verlag der Autoren, 2009, ISBN 978-3-88661-318-2.
- Juja, Novel, Verbrecher-Verlag, 2010, ISBN 978-3-940426-48-2.
- Mein sanfter Zwilling (My Gentle Twin), Novel, Frankfurter Verlagsanstalt, 2011, ISBN 978-3-627-00175-9.
- Zorn (Anger), Screen Play, Verlag der Autoren, 2011, ISBN 978-3-88661-342-7.
- Das achte Leben (Für Brilka) (The Eighth Life (For Brilka)), Novel, Frankfurter Verlagsanstalt, 2014, ISBN 978-3-627-00208-4.
- Die Katze und der General (The Cat and the General), Novel, Frankfurter Verlagsanstalt, 2018, ISBN 978-3-627-00254-1.
- L'ottava vita (per Brilka), Marsilio, Venice, 2020, ISBN 978-88-297-0506-1.
- Das mangelnde Licht, Novel, Frankfurter Verlagsanstalt, 2022, ISBN 978-3-627-00293-0.
- The Lack of Light, translated by Charlotte Collins and Ruth Martin, HarperCollins, 2025, ISBN 978-0-06-349094-9.
- The Eighth Life (For Brilka), translated by Charlotte Collins and Ruth Martin, HarperCollins, 2026, ISBN 978-0-06-348585-3.
