= Volha Hapeyeva =

Belarusian poet

- Вольга Гапеева
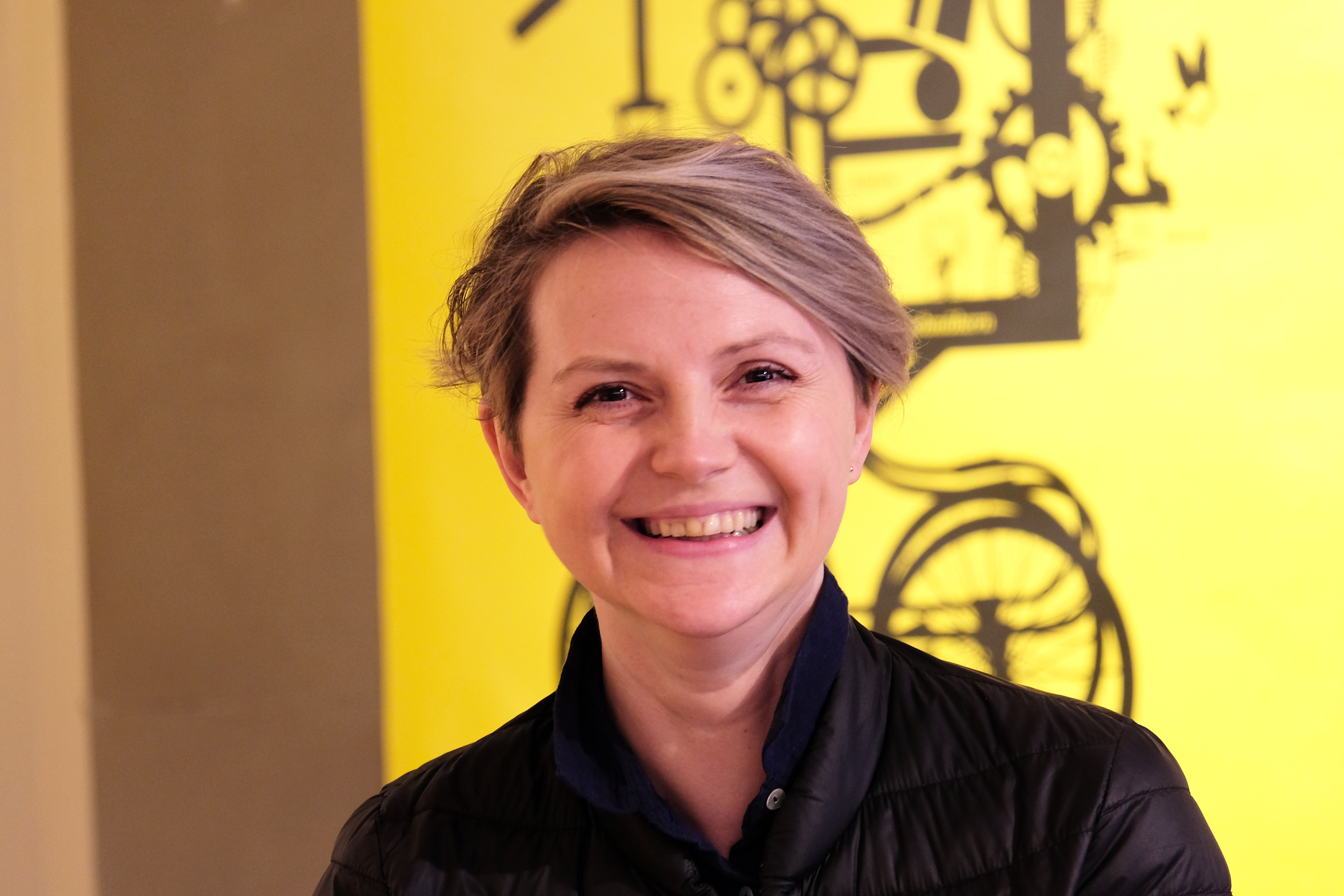
- Born: Minsk, Belarus
- Writing career
- Notable awards: PEN Translates 2021
- Website: hapeyeva.org

Volha Hapeyeva (Belarusian: Вольга Гапеева; born 1982 in Minsk) is a Belarusian poet, writer, translator, and linguist. Hapeyeva holds a doctorate in comparative linguistics and has taught at two universities, in Minsk and Vilnius.

Hapeyeva has been publishing poetry, prose, and drama since 1999. In addition, she is a translator of fiction and poetry from English, German, Chinese, and Japanese. She is a member of the Belarusian PEN-Centre and of the Union of the Belarusian Writers.

Her works have been translated into English, German, Polish, Czech, Macedonian, Latvian, Lithuanian, Slovenian, Georgian, Dutch, and Russian. A collection of her poetry in English, In My Garden of Mutants, appeared with Arc Publications in 2021, translated by Annie Rutherford. The collection received a PEN Translates award. Volha collaborates with electronic musicians and gives audio-visual performances.

== Translation activity ==
Volha Hapeyeva translates to Belarusian mainly from English, German and Chinese, but also other languages, including Japanese, Latvian and Ukrainian. She teaches translation theory and practice at Minsk State Linguistic University and gives seminars on translation studies for various initiatives and organizations. She does not use bridge languages or word-for-word translations and always translates directly from the original language. Among others, she has translated works by Robert Walser, Sarah Kane, Dai Wangshu, Mari Konno, Maira Asare and Sergey Timofeev.

== Scholarships and awards ==
- August 2008 Sommerakademie für Übersetzer deutscher Literatur, Literarischen Colloquium Berlin.
- July–August 2009 Literary Colloquium Berlin (Germany)
- August 2010 International House of Writers and Translators Ventspils (Latvia)
- 2011 “Golden Apostrophe” Literary Award for the Best Publication of Poetry
- July 2012 International House of Writers and Translators Ventspils (Latvia)
- July–August 2013 Artist in Residence in the International Hause of Authors Graz „IHAG“ (Austria).
- Autumn 2013 “Ex-libris” Prize for the best Children's book "Sumny sup” (‘Sad Soup’).
- April–May 2014 Artist-in-Residence in Wien (KulturKontakr Austria und Bundesministerium für Unterricht, Kunst und Kultur).
- 2015 – winner of the Literature Prize “A Book of the Year”.
- 2017: "The Grammar of Snow" named Best Poetry Book of 2017 by Radio Liberty
- 2018: "The Grammar of Snow" shortlisted for the Prize for Best Poetry Book after Natallia Arsennieva
- 2020: "Black Poppies" was shortlisted for the Prize for Best Poetry Book after Natallia Arsennieva
- 2021 – PEN Translates award for In My Garden of Mutants (UK)

== Bibliography ==
=== Translated into English ===
Volha Hapeyeva, tr. Annie Rutherford: In My Garden of Mutants – Arc, 2021 (poetry)

=== Books (all in Belarusian) ===
1. Volha Hapeyeva “Reconstruction of the Sky”. – Minsk: Lohvinau, 2003. – 142 p. (poetry, prose, drama).
2. Volha Hapeyeva “Unshaven Morning”. – Minsk: Lohvinau, 2008. – 65 p. (book of poetry).
3. Volha Hapeyeva “Moiré Fringe Method”. – Minsk: Galijafy, 2012. – 76 p. (book of poetry).
4. Volha Hapeyeva “Embers and Stubble”. – Minsk: Lohvinau, 2013. – 60 p. (book of poetry with CD).
5. Volha Hapeyeva “(Incr)edible stories”. – Minsk: bybooks.eu, 2013. – (e-book of short stories).
6. Volha Hapeyeva “Sad Soup”. – Minsk: Halijafy, 2014. – 72 p. (a children's book).
7. Volha Hapeyeva “Two Sheep” (book for children in poems) – Minsk: Lohvinau. – (in print).
8. Volha Hapeyeva "The Grammar of Snow" – Minsk: Halijafy, 2014. – (poetry)
9. Volha Hapeyeva "Black Poppies" – Minsk: Halijafy, 2017. – (poetry)
10. Volha Hapeyeva "Words that Happened to Me" – Minsk: Halijafy, 2020. – (poetry)
11. Volha Hapeyeva "Camel Travel" – Minsk: Halijafy, 2020. – (novel)
12. Volha Hapeyeva "Under Separate Blankets" – London: Skaryna Press, 2024. – (poetry)

=== Publications in anthologies (selected) ===
- «Labirynt. Antologia współczesnego dramatu białoruskiego» — Radzyń Podlaski, 2013.
- “European Borderlands. Sprachlandschaften der Poesie”. – Міnsk : Lohvinau, 2009. – 96 p.
- “Frontlinie–2” / Anthologie der Deutschen und Belarussischen Texten. – Minsk: Lohvinau, 2007.
- “Krasa i Sila. Anthology of Belarusian Lyric of the 20th c.”/ Comp. by Skobla M.; Ed. by Pashkevich – Minsk: Limaryus, 2003. – 880 p.
- “Frontlinie” / Anthologie der Deutschen und Belarussischen Texten. – Minsk: Lohvinau, 2003. – 240 p.
- “Versh na Svabodu” (Poem for Liberty). Poetry Anthology. Radio Liberty, 2002. – 464 p.
- “Anthology of the Young Poems”. Miensk: Uradzhaj, 2001. – 351 p.

=== Publications in literary magazines ===
- “Modern Poetry in Translation” (UK)
- “Hopscotch” (US)
- “Tint Journal” (US)
- “ARCHE” (Belarus)
- „Dziejaslou“ (Belarus)
- „pARTtizan“ (Belarus)
- “Maladosc” (Belarus)
- “Krynica” (Belarus)
- “Pershacvet“ (Belarus)
- “Polymia” (Belarus)
- “Texty” (Belarus)
- “Blesok” (Macedonia)
- „Die Horen“ (Germany)
- „OSTRAGEHEGE“ (Germany)
- „Literatur und Kritik“ (Austria)
- „Manuskripte“ (Austria)
- “ახალი საუნჯე” (New Treasure, Georgia)
