= Rehau =

- Town
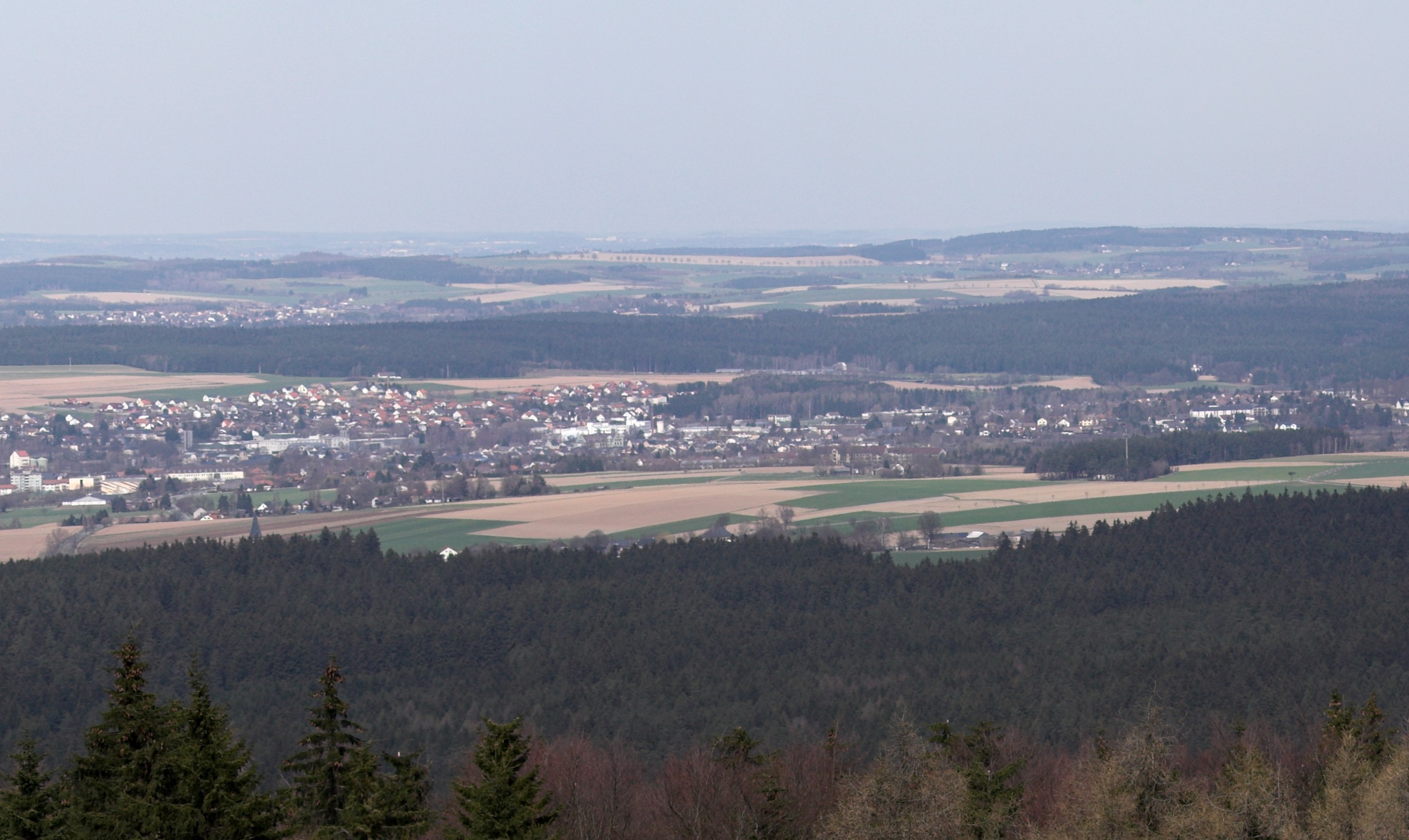
- Rehau

- Coat of arms

- Location of Rehau within Hof district
- Interactive map of Rehau
- Location within Germany Location within Bavaria
- Coordinates: 50°15′N 12°01′E
- Country: Germany
- State: Bavaria
- Admin. region: Oberfranken
- District: Hof
- Subdivisions: 6 Ortsteile

Government
  - Mayor (2020–26): Michael Abraham (CSU)

Area
  - Total: 80.33 km^{2} (31.02 sq mi)
- Elevation: 528 m (1,732 ft)

Population (2025-12-31)
  - Total: 9,055
  - Density: 112.7/km^{2} (291.9/sq mi)
- Time zone: UTC+01:00 (CET)
  - Summer (DST): UTC+02:00 (CEST)
- Postal codes: 95111
- Dialling codes: 09283
- Vehicle registration: HO, REH
- Website: www.stadt-rehau.de

Rehau (German pronunciation: [ˈʁeːaʊ]) is a town in the district of Hof, in Bavaria, Germany. Rehau is situated in the Fichtel Mountains, 12 km southeast of Hof, and 12 km west of Aš.

== History ==
The first documented name of Rehau was "Resawe" in the year 1234.

== Economy ==
Formerly a fairly isolated town, located as it is near both Czech and former East German borders, with the fall of The Wall, it is now in the centre of a growing area, with a new highway providing ready access from Nuremberg and Munich. The principal employer and economic engine is the polymer manufacturer Rehau AG & Co, which was founded in 1948. With more than 15,000 employees Rehau is an international company that produces products for the construction industry, automotive and general industry.

== Notable people ==
- Peter Angermann (born 1945), painter
- Eberhard Bodenschatz (born 1959), physicist
- Karl-Heinrich Bodenschatz, (1890–1979), army general
- Arthur Grimm (1908 – after 1990), photographer
- Hans Grimm (1905–1998), director
- Jobst Wagner (born 1959), head of Rehau Group

=== People who have worked on the ground ===
- Eugen Gomringer, (1925–2025), artist
- Nora-Eugenie Gomringer, (born 1980), artist
