= List of German literary awards =

A literary award or literary prize is an award presented in recognition of a particularly lauded literary piece or body of work. It is normally presented to an author. This is a list of notable literary awards awarded in Germany.

== By state ==
=== Baden-Württemberg ===
- Berthold-Auerbach-Literaturpreis
- Bodensee-Literaturpreis
- Droste-Preis
- Feuergriffel
- Johann-Friedrich-von-Cotta-Literatur- und Übersetzerpreis der Landeshauptstadt Stuttgart
- Johann-Peter-Hebel-Plakette
- Johann-Peter-Hebel-Preis
- Ludwig-Uhland-Preis
- Mörike-Preis der Stadt Fellbach
- Peter-Härtling-Preis
- Peter Huchel Prize
- Preis der SWR-Bestenliste
- Thaddäus-Troll-Preis

=== Bavaria ===
- August-Graf-von-Platen-Preis
- Bayerischer Kunstförderpreis
- Bayerischer Poetentaler
- Carl-Amery-Literaturpreis
- Ernst-Toller-Preis
- Friedrich-Märker-Preis
- Friedrich-Rückert-Preis
- Großer Literaturpreis der Bayerischen Akademie der Schönen Künste
- Großer Preis der Deutschen Akademie für Kinder- und Jugendliteratur e.V. Volkach
- Irseer Pegasus
- Jakob-Wassermann-Literaturpreis
- Jean-Paul-Preis
- Landshuter Jugendbuchpreis
- Literaturpreis der Stadt München
- Literaturpreis der Wilhelm und Christine Hirschmann-Stiftung
- Marie Luise Kaschnitz Prize
- Penzberger Urmel
- Willibald-Pirckheimer-Medaille

=== Berlin ===
- Alex-Wedding-Preis
- Karl-Preusker-Medaille

=== Brandenburg ===
- Fontane Prize of the City of Neuruppin

=== Bremen ===
- Albatros Literaturpreis

=== Hessen ===
- Brothers Grimm Prize of the City of Hanau
- Brothers Grimm Prize of the University of Marburg
- Einhard-Preis
- Frauenkrimipreis der Stadt Wiesbaden
- Georg-Christoph-Lichtenberg-Preis
- George-Konell-Preis
- Goethe Prize
- Hessischer Leseförderpreis
- Holzhäuser Heckethaler
- Janusz-Korczak-Preis
- Johann-Heinrich-Merck-Preis
- Leonce-und-Lena-Preis
- Literaturpreis der Universitätsstadt Marburg und des Landkreises Marburg-Biedenkopf
- Mannheimer Heinrich-Vetter-Literaturpreis
- Phantastik-Preis der Stadt Wetzlar
- Rheingau Literatur Preis
- Ricarda-Huch-Preis
- Wolfgang Weyrauch Prize

== Alphabetically ==
=== A ===
- Adelbert von Chamisso Prize
- Alemannischer Literaturpreis
- Alfred Döblin Prize
- Alfred-Döblin-Stipendium
- Alfred-Kerr-Preis
- Alfred-Müller-Felsenburg-Preis
- Andreas Gryphius Prize
- Anna Seghers-Preis
- Aspekte-Literaturpreis

=== B ===
- Bertelsmann-Preisausschreiben
- Bettina-von-Arnim-Preis
- Bertolt-Brecht-Literaturpreis
- Georg Büchner Prize
- Buxtehude Bull

=== C ===
- Calw Hermann Hesse Prize
- Candide Preis
- Caroline-Schlegel-Preis
- Christian-Wagner-Preis
- Clemens-Brentano-Preis
- Corine Literature Prize

=== D ===
- Dedalus-Preis für Neue Literatur
- DeLiA
- Deutsche Schillerstiftung
- Deutscher Bücherpreis
- Deutscher Erzählerpreis (2008)
- Deutscher Fantasy Preis
- Deutscher Hörbuchpreis
- Deutscher Jugendliteraturpreis
- Deutscher Jugendtheaterpreis
- Deutscher Krimi Preis
- Deutscher Kritikerpreis
- Deutscher Science Fiction Preis
- Deutscher Vorlesepreis

=== E ===
- Egon Erwin Kisch Prize
- Eichendorff-Literaturpreis
- Elisabeth-Engelhardt-Literaturpreis
- Erich Fromm Prize
- Erik-Reger-Preis
- Ernst Reuter Prize
- Ernst-Hoferichter-Preis
- Ernst-Meister-Preis für Lyrik
- Ernst-Robert-Curtius-Preis
- Eugen-Helmlé-Übersetzerpreis
- Europäischer Übersetzerpreis Offenburg
- Evangelischer Buchpreis

=== F ===
- F.-C.-Weiskopf-Preis
- Fontane Prize of the City of Neuruppin
- Förderpreis für Literatur der Landeshauptstadt Düsseldorf
- Frankfurter Anthologie
- Franz-Hessel-Preis
- Friedlandpreis der Heimkehrer
- Friedrich Nietzsche Prize
- Friedrich-Baur-Preis
- Friedrich-Gundolf-Preis
- Friedrich-Hölderlin-Preis

=== G ===
- Georg Dehio Book Prize
- German Book Prize
- Gerrit-Engelke-Preis
- Geschwister-Scholl-Preis
- Goethe Prize
- Goldene Leslie
- Grimmelshausen-Preis
- Guntram and Irene Rinke Foundation

=== H ===
- Hans Fallada Prize
- Hans-Erich-Nossack-Preis
- Hanseatic Goethe Prize
- Heinrich Heine Prize
- Heinrich-Böll-Preis
- Heinrich-Droste-Literaturpreis
- Heinrich-Heine-Preis des Ministeriums für Kultur der DDR
- Heinrich-Schmidt-Barrien-Preis
- Heinrich-Wolgast-Preis
- Helen and Kurt Wolff Translator's Prize
- Hermann-Hesse-Literaturpreis
- Hermann-Lenz-Preis
- Hoffmann von Fallersleben Prize
- Hölty Prize
- Hörbuchbestenliste
- Hörspielpreis der Kriegsblinden
- Horst Bienek Prize for Poetry
- Hubert-Burda-Preis für junge Lyrik
- Hugo-Jacobi-Preis

=== I ===
- Ida-Dehmel-Literaturpreis
- Immermann-Preis
- Ingeborg-Drewitz-Literaturpreis für Gefangene
- International Literature Award
- Ist das Ihr Fahrrad, Mr. O'Brien?
- Italo-Svevo-Preis

=== J ===
- Johannes-Saß-Preis
- Joseph-Breitbach-Preis

=== K ===
- Kalbacher Klapperschlange
- Kalckhoff Medal
- Karl Jaspers Prize
- Karl-Vossler-Preis
- Kassel Literary Prize
- Kleist Prize
- KölnLiteraturPreis
- Kranichsteiner Literaturpreis
- Kurd Laßwitz Award
- Kuriosester Buchtitel des Jahres
- Kurt-Tucholsky-Preis

=== L ===
- Leipzig Book Fair Prize
- Lessing Prize of the Free State of Saxony
- Lettre Ulysses Award
- Lion-Feuchtwanger-Preis
- Literaturpreis der Konrad-Adenauer-Stiftung
- Literaturpreis der Stadt Bremen
- Literaturpreis des Kulturkreises der deutschen Wirtschaft
- Literaturpreis Prenzlauer Berg
- Ludwig Börne Prize

=== M ===
- Heinrich Mann Prize
- Mannheimer Heinrich-Vetter-Literaturpreis
- Margarete-Schrader-Preis
- Marieluise-Fleißer-Preis
- MDR-Literaturpreis
- Merck Kakehashi Literature Prize
- MIMI

=== N ===
- NDR Kultur Sachbuchpreis
- Nelly Sachs Prize
- Nicolas Born Prize

=== P ===
- Petrarca-Preis
- Phantastik-Preis der Stadt Wetzlar
- Poetik-Professur an der Universität Bamberg
- Preis der Literaturhäuser
- Preis der Stadt Münster für Europäische Poesie

=== Q-R ===
- Quickborn-Preis
- Rainer-Malkowski-Preis
- Roswitha Prize

=== S ===
- Schiller Memorial Prize
- Schubart-Literaturpreis
- Siegfried Unseld Preis
- Sigmund Freud Prize

=== T ===
- Thomas Mann Prize
- Thüringer Literaturpreis
- Toucan Prize

=== V-Z ===
- Victor Otto Stomps-Preis
- Volks-Schillerpreis
- Wilhelm Raabe Literature Prize
- Würth-Literaturpreis
- Würth-Preis für Europäische Literatur
- Carl Zuckmayer Medal

== See also ==
- List of literary awards
- List of poetry awards
- List of the world's richest literary prizes
- Literary festival
- Vanity award
