= Marc Degens =

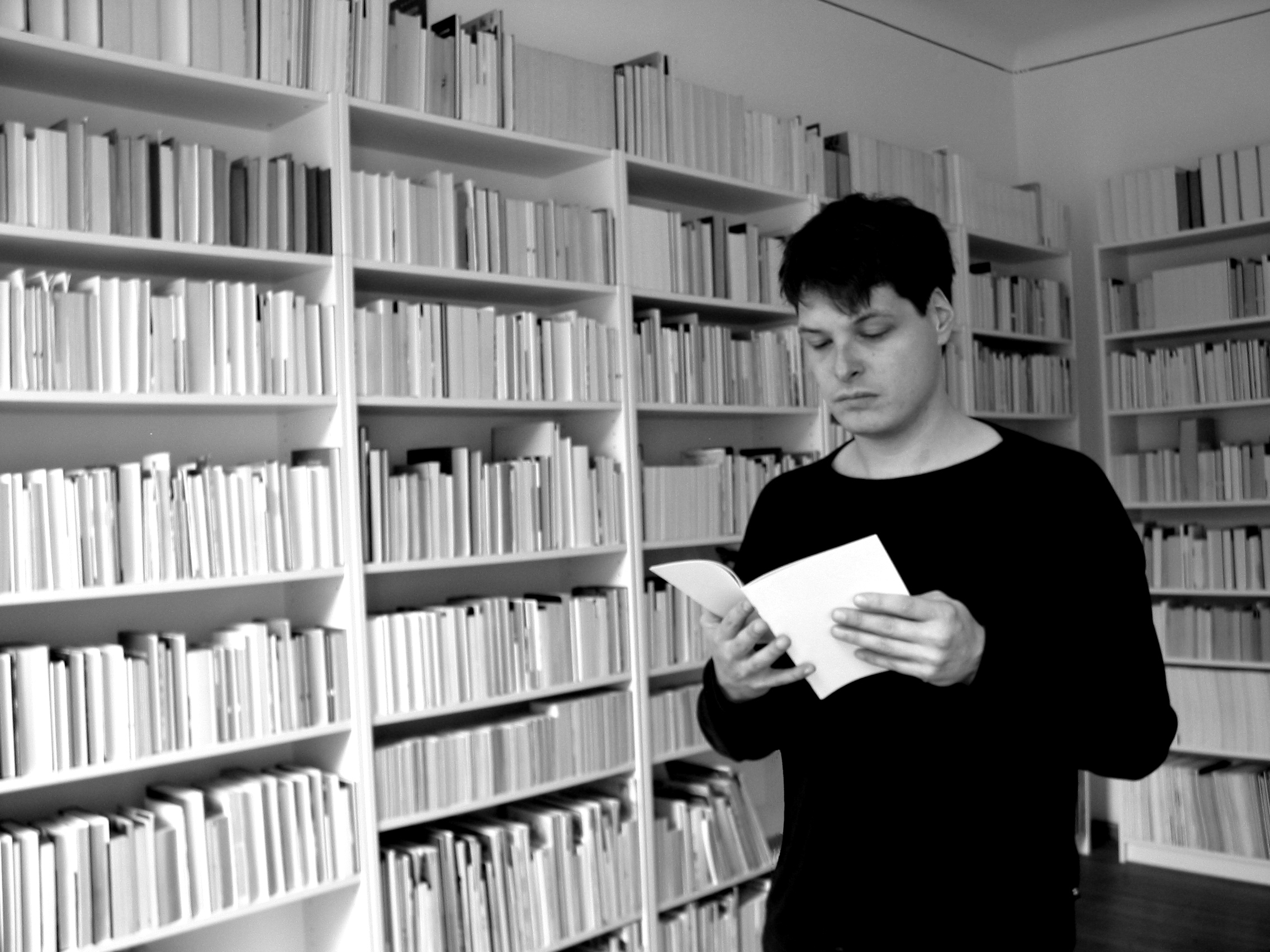
- Degens in 2005 in Berlin
- Born: 18 August 1971 (age 54); Essen, West Germany
- Occupations: Novelist, essayist, short-story writer, and musician

Marc Degens (born 18 August 1971) is a German novelist, essayist, short-story writer, and musician.

== Life and work ==
Born in Essen, Degens grew up in the Ruhr Valley, and finished high school in Dorsten. He studied German studies and sociology at the Ruhr-Universität Bochum, and graduated in 1999 with a work about Intertextuality and Distinction. In 1996, he founded a small but eclectic publishing house, SuKuLTuR, for which he has edited 147 volumes of the series “Schöner Lesen.” The series featured the work of German Writers such as Ann Cotten, Dietmar Dath, Wolfgang Herrndorf, and Clemens J. Setz, and German translations of works by Washington Cucurto, Denise Duhamel, Chris Kraus, Sarah Manguso, and Jeffrey McDaniel. More than 100,000 copies of these books have been sold from vending machines in Berlin alone.

His own writings include novels, short stories, essays, poems, and editorials. From 2000 to 2012, he was the literary editor of the online cultural magazine satt.org. In 2014, he was awarded the Hugo-Ball-Literaturförderpreis. He lives in Hamburg.

== Distinctions ==
- 2010 Writer-in-residence in Novi Sad, Serbia
- 2011 V.O.Stomps-Förderpreis der Stadt Mainz (for SuKuLTuR publishing)
- 2014 Förderpreis zum Hugo-Ball-Preis der Stadt Pirmasens

== Work ==
=== Books, novels, stories, poetry, essays ===
- Selfie ohne Selbst. Short Novel. Berenberg Verlag, Berlin 2022. ISBN 978-3-949203-26-8
- Toronto. Aufzeichnungen aus Kanada. Journals. Mairisch Verlag, Hamburg 2020. ISBN 978-3-938539-59-0
- Eriwan. Aufzeichnungen aus Armenien. Journals. Mit 124 Fotos des Autors. Ille & Riemer, Leipzig 2018. ISBN 978-3-95420-031-3
- Fuckin Sushi. Novel. Dumont Buchverlag, Cologne 2015, ISBN 978-3-8321-9747-6
- Wremen am Ende. Stories, poetry, Essen. Berlin 2014.
- Das kaputte Knie Gottes. Novel. Knaus Verlag, Berlin 2011. ISBN 978-3813504-26-2
- Unsere Popmoderne. Stories. Verbrecher Verlag, Berlin 2010. ISBN 978-3-940426-59-8
- Die SuKuLTuR Jahre. Short story. Berlin 2009. (= „Schöner Lesen“ No. 88)
- Abweichen. Über Bücher, Comics, Musik. Essays. Leipzig 2009.
- Hier keine Kunst. Novel. Erata Literaturverlag, Leipzig 2008.
- Ich kann. Stories. Berlin 2008. (= „Schöner Lesen“ No. 73)
- Unsere Popmoderne. Stories. Berlin 2005.
- Für mich. Prose, poetry. Berlin 2004.
- Rückbau. Short Novel. Berlin 2003.
- pop.mitte.berlin. Ein Lob auf die Mittelmäßigkeit. Stories. Berlin 2001.
- Himmel die Berge. Stories. Berlin 1999. (= „Schöner Lesen“ No. 8)
- Vanity Love. Novel. Alkyon Verlag, Weissach i. T. 1997.
- Hure Liebe. Verschwiegene Wahrheit. Story. Berlin 1997.
- Im Un- und Hintergrund. Von der literarischen Sackgasse zum Social Beat und wieder zurück. Essay. Berlin 1997.
- Die geraffte Wahrheit dieses Tags. Short Story. Berlin 1997. (= „Schöner Lesen“ No. 4)
- Man sucht sich. Poetry, Stories. Berlin 1996. (= „Schöner Lesen“ No. 2)
- Der Weg eines Armlosen in die Top Ten der Tennisweltrangliste. Stories, Berlin 1996.
- Absichten und Einsichten. Texte zum Selbstverständnis eines zeitgenössischen Autors. Stories. Berlin 1996.
- Der Knubbel. Short Story. Berlin 1996. (= „Schöner Lesen“ No. 1)
- Frickie-Frickie und andere komische Geschichten. Stories. Berlin 1994.
- Farben und Formen. Prose, poetry. Marl 1993.

=== Music ===
- Superschiff: Frauen. 2003.
- Superschiff: Wir sind Superschiff. 2002.
- Stendal Blast: Müll. 1993.
