= Barbara Köhler =

German poet and translator (1959–2021)

Barbara Köhler (11 April 1959 – 8 January 2021) was a German poet and translator.

She was born in Burgstädt, East Germany, but was raised in Penig. She studied at the Johannes R. Becher Literature Institute in Leipzig in 1985. She was there for three years then later started writing for magazines. After the fall of the Berlin Wall, she was able to publish her first collection, Deutsches Roulette, meaning German Roulette, in 1991 with the publishing company Suhrkamp Verlag. Many more publications such as her poetry collection Blue Box (1995) and Wittgensteins Nichte (1999), meaning Wittgenstein's Niece, came soon afterwards.

She released Niemands Frau, her most well known work, in 2007. Meaning Nobody's Wife, Niemands Frau tells the story of the Odyssey in the perspective of its female characters. Köhler explains in her Afterword this was done so as to not make them "there in the story as though they weren’t really there: just there for him, for the hero." In 2009, Köhler won the Poetry Prize of the German Industry Culture Group, among several other awards, for Niemands Frau.

Köhler lived in Duisburg from 1994 until her death in 2021. She worked as an English and French translator and had been recognized for her versions of Gertrude Stein and Samuel Beckett.

== Early life ==
Barbara Köhler was born in Burgstädt, East Germany, 11 April 1959. She grew up in Penig. After finishing the Abitur, the school system in Germany, she was a textile production worker in Plauen for a while. Before becoming a poet, she also worked in an elderly home, and was a lighting assistant for the city theater in Karl Marx Stadt, now known as Chemnitz. In 1985, she studied at the Johannes R. Becher Literature Institute in Leipzig for three years (now known as the German Institute for Literature), then started publishing work for magazines. Once the Berlin Wall fell, her own poetry and work began being published.

== Career ==
Köhler's career in poetry took off in 1991 with the publication of her first collection, Deutsches Roulette, meaning German Roulette. She published several other works succeeding Deutsches Roulette. In 1995, she published Blue Box while working as a town writer in Rheinsberg. In 1997, she wrote as a residence writer at the University of Warwick. A year later, Cor Responde was published and, a year after that, Wittgensteins Nichte was as well. In the early 2000s, Barbara Köhler worked on her German translations for Stein and Beckett's writing. In 2000, Ungarisches Wasser, meaning Hungarian Water, also came out. In 2007, her latest work, Niemands Frau and No One's Boxwas published. Köhler worked as a freelancer since 1988 and lived in Duisburg after moving there in 1994. She died on 8 January 2021.

== Writing ==
=== Use of language ===
Barbara Köhler's writing style is characterized by her use of language. She plays with the grammar and diction in her poetry, and demonstrates the subjectivity of language. She often has a stanza, then repeats it, except one similar sounding or spelled word from that stanza will have been changed, altering the stanza's original meaning. This is shown in work such as Niemands Frau, the premise of the retelling being that "er", meaning "he" in German, is changed to "sie", meaning "they" or "she" in German, switching from the single voice of Odysseus to the various female voices and showing their point of views.

=== Influences ===
Barbara Köhler was heavily influenced by classic literature. This was possibly attributed to the time period she wrote in, which was known as the "classical turn" in German poetry during the mid-1990s. With East Germany's collapse in 1989 and German reunification in 1990, writers looked back on classic literature and philosophers to explain civilization and to understand the changes that were occurring around them. They used ancient works as models, looking for relationships between their present reality to ancient myths, especially through the work of Homer. Thereby potentially influencing Barbara Köhler, as Niemands Frau focuses on the Odyssey. However, Barbara Köhler's interest in Homer may be accredited to her own understanding as a poet and skepticism of the classics. She criticizes classical material for its ideas and assumptions about women's passivity and how classical material has passed down these ideas into western culture. Köhler, therefore, seeks and writes about portrayals of women who are independent and free from these assumptions. Work with the classics and literary heritage was, for Köhler, done to "interrogate the grammar of patriarchal power."

Correction to the above: The rewriting of mythological stories from the woman's perspective is something Köhler would have been familiar with from her past in East Germany - Christa Wolf's 1983/84 novel Kassandra, for example, was a hugely successful book that retold the story of the Trojan war from the woman's perspective.

== List of works ==
Poetry:

- Deutsches Roulette (1991)
- Blue Box (1995)
- Cor Responde (1998)
- Wittgensteins Nichte (1999)
- Ungarisches Wasser (2000)
- Niemands Frau (2007)
- No One's Box (2007)
- Neufundland. Schriften, teils bestimmt (2012)

Translations:

- zeit zum essen. eine tischgesellschaft (2001) by Gertrude Stein
- Tender Buttons – Zarte knöpft (2004) by Gertrude Stein
- Trötentöne / Mirlitonnades (2005) by Samuel Beckett

== Awards ==
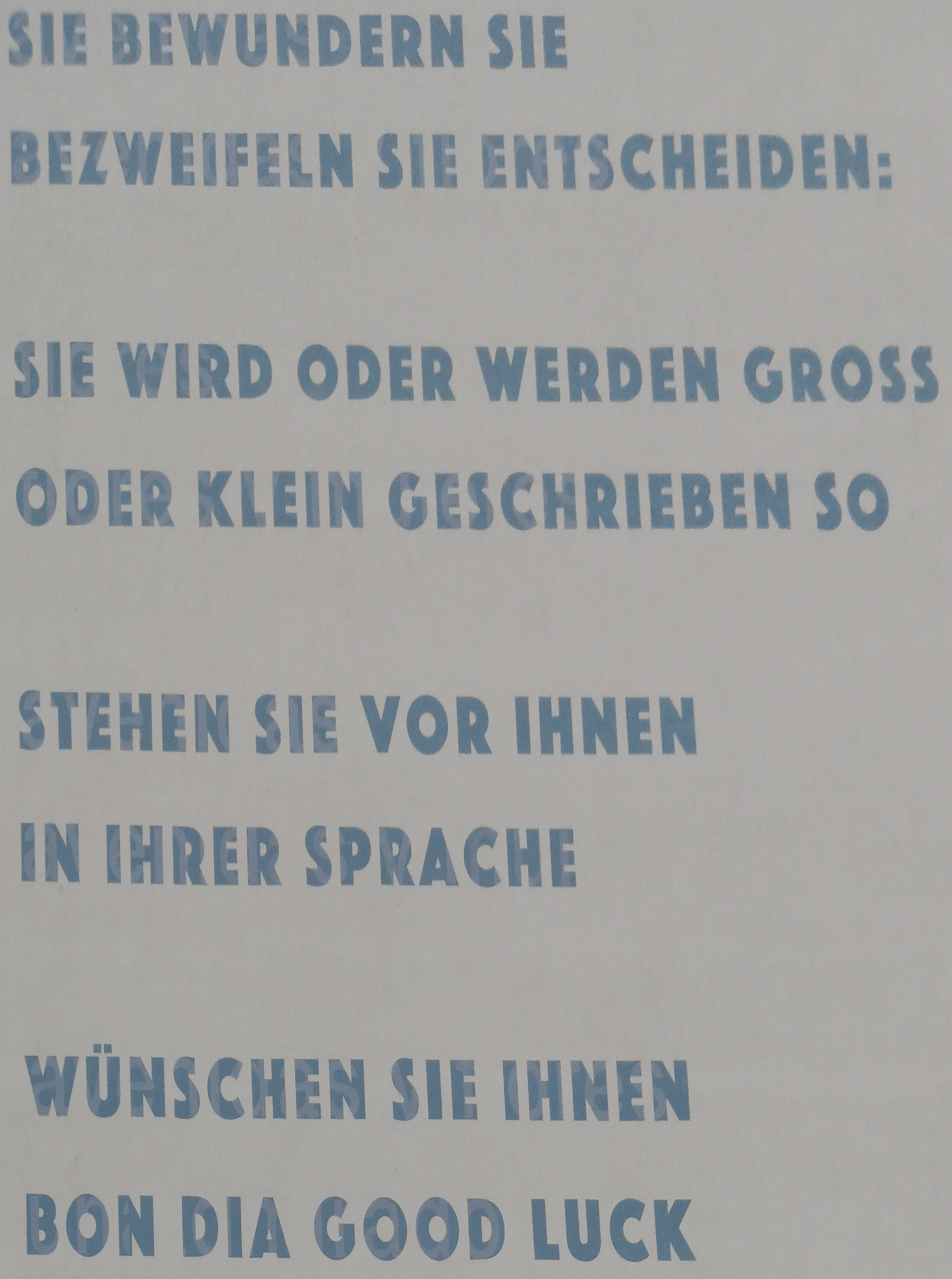
poem at Alice Salomon University

Timeline:

- 1990 Jürgen Ponto Foundation Prize
- 1991 Leonce-und-Lena-Preis, Arbeitsstipendium
- 1992 Hölderlin Prize (Förderpreis) of the City of Bad Homburg
- 1994 Else-Lasker-Schüler-Prize
- 1996 Clemens Brentano Prize of the City of Heidelberg
- 1997 Literature Contribution of the State of North Rhine-Westphalia
- 1999 Literature Prize of the Ruhr Area
- 2001 Lessing Prize of the Free State of Saxony
- 2003 Samuel Bogumil-Linde Prize for Literature
- 2008 Joachim Ringelnatz Prize
- 2009 Poetry Prize of the Culture Circle of the German Economy
- 2009 Erlanger literature prize for poetry as a translation (together with Ulf Stolterfoht)
- 2012 Thomas Kling Poetics lecturer at the Rheinische Friedrich-Wilhelms-Universität Bonn
- 2016 Peter Huchel Prize for German-language lyric poetry
- 2017 Alice Salomon Poet Prize
