= Sema Kaygusuz =

Turkish writer

Sema Kaygusuz (born August 29, 1972, in Samsun, Turkey) is a novelist, playwright, essayist, and short story writer from Turkey. Her work has been translated into English, Italian, German, French, Swedish, and Norwegian. She won a Yunus Nadi Award in 2016 for her novel Laughter of the Barbarian. Among other accolades, she is a recipient of the Cevdet-Kudret-Literature Award, the France-Turquie Literary Award, and was named laureate of the German Friedrich Rückert Prize. The English translation of her novel Yüzünde Bir Yer (Every Fire You Tend) won both the TA First Translation Prize and an English PEN Award. She currently resides in Istanbul.

As a screenwriter, she co-wrote the screenplay for the 2008 film Pandora's Box (Turkish: Pandora'nın Kutusu) with director Yeşim Ustaoğlu.

== Selected works ==
=== In Turkish ===
- Ortadan Yarısından (short story), 1997
- Sandık Lekesi (short story), 2000
- Doyma Noktası (short story), 2002
- Esir Sözler Kuyusu (short story), 2004
- Yere Düşen Dualar (novel), 2006
- Yüzünde Bir Yer (novel), 2009
- Karaduygun (short story), 2012
- Barbarın Kahkahası (novel), 2016
- Aramızdaki Ağaç Yazılar (essays), 2019

=== Translated works ===
- Wein und Gold Roman, translated by Barbara Yurtdaş and Hüseyin Yurtdaş (Suhrkamp Verlag, 2008)
- La chute des prières: roman, translated by Noémi Cingöz (Actes Sud, 2009)
- Ce lieu sur ton visage: roman, translated by Catherine Erikan (Actes Sud, 2013)
- En bønn faller til jorden, translated by Cora Skylstad (Cappelen Damm, 2015)
- Platsen i ditt ansikte, translated by Ulla Bruncrona (Ersatz, 2015)
- The Well of Trapped Words, translated by Maureen Freely (Comma Press, 2015)
- L'éclat de rire du barbare, translated by Catherine Erikan (Lettres turques, 2017)
- Every Fire You Tend, translated by Nicholas Glastonbury (Tilted Axis Press, 2019)
- La risata del barbaro, translated by Giulia Ansaldo (Voland, 2020) ISBN 9788862434065
- The Passenger: Turkey (Europa Editions, 2021)

== See also ==
- Kurdistan +100: Stories from a Future State
