= Deutscher Erzählerpreis =

Deutscher Erzählerpreis may refer to:

- Deutscher Erzählerpreis (1962)
- Deutscher Erzählerpreis (2008)
