= Tsantsa (disambiguation) =

Tsantsa is the Shuar name for a shrunken head.

Tsantsa may also refer to:

- Tsantsa (journal), an academic journal published from 1996 to 2022
- The Tsantsa Memoirs, a book by author Jan Koneffke
