= Clemens-Brentano-Preis =

German literary award

Clemens-Brentano-Preis of the city of Heidelberg is a literary prize of Germany. It was established in 1993, and named after the German poet Clemens Brentano (1778–1842). The prize money is €10,000.

== Recipients ==
- 1993 Günter Coufal for Am Fenster
- 1995 Gabriele Kögl for Das Mensch
- 1996 Barbara Köhler for Blue Box, Jörg Schieke for Die Rosen zitieren die Adern
- 1997 Daniel Zahno for Doktor Turban
- 1998 Benjamin Korn for Kunst, Macht und Moral
- 1999 Norbert Niemann for Wie man's nimmt
- 2000 Oswald Egger for Herde der Rede and Der Rede Dreh, Hendrik Rost for Fliegende Schatten
- 2001 Sabine Peters for Nimmersatt
- 2002 Doron Rabinovici for Credo und Credit
- 2003 Andreas Maier for Klausen
- 2004 Raphael Urweider for Das Gegenteil von Fleisch
- 2005 Anna Katharina Hahn for Kavaliersdelikt
- 2006 Stefan Weidner for Mohammedanische Versuchungen
- 2007 Clemens Meyer for Als wir träumten
- 2008 Ann Cotten for Fremdwörterbuchsonette
- 2009 Andreas Stichmann for Jackie in Silber, Felicia Zeller for Einsam lehnen am Bekannten
- 2010 Sven Hillenkamp for Das Ende der Liebe. Gefühle im Zeitalter unendlicher Freiheit
- 2011 Wolfgang Herrndorf for Tschick
- 2012 Alexander Gumz for Ausrücken mit Modellen
- 2013 Philipp Schönthaler for Nach oben ist das Leben offen. Erzählungen
- 2014 Maximilian Probst for Der Drahtesel. Die letzte humane Technik
- 2015 Saskia Hennig von Lange for the novel Zurück zum Feuer
- 2016 Thilo Krause for Um die Dinge ganz zu lassen
- 2017 Jan Snela for Milchgesicht. Ein Bestiarium der Liebe
- 2018 Philipp Stadelmaier for Die mittleren Regionen. Über Terror und Meinung
- 2019 Gianna Molinari for Hier ist noch alles möglich
- 2020 Levin Westermann for bezüglich der schatten
- 2021 Simon Sailer for Die Schrift
- 2022 Hanna Engelmeier for Trost. Vier Übungen
