= Kurdistan +100: Stories from a Future State =

Kurdish short story anthology of futuristic fiction

- Editor: Orsola Casagrande, Mustafa Gündoğdu
- Language: English
- Subject: Kurdish future, Kurdish political fiction
- Genre: Futuristic fiction, Science fiction, Kurdish literature
- Publisher: Comma Press
- Publication date: 2023
- Pages: 240
- ISBN: 978-1646052806
- Website: Comman Press book page

Kurdistan +100: Stories from a Future State is a book edited by Orsola Casagrande and Mustafa Gündoğdu published in 2023 by Comma Press. (Note: ebook was released in 2024.) The work is an anthology of short stories by thirteen contemporary Kurdish writers, envisioning a possible Kurdish future in 2046, the 100 year anniversary of the Kurdish Republic of Mahabad. The book has been described as the first anthology of Kurdish science fiction and as a collection of futuristic fiction.

== Structure ==
The work opens with an introduction by book editors Orsola Casagrande and Mustafa Gündoğdu, followed by the stories:

- Waiting for the Leopard by Sema Kaygusuz; translated from the Turkish by Nicholos Glastonbury.
- The Wishing Star by Jîl Şwanî.
- Friends Beyond the Mountains by Ava Homa.
- My Handsome One by Selahattin Demirtaş (author); translated from the Turkish by Amy Spangler.
- The Letter by Nariman Evdike; translated from the Kurmanji by Rojin Shekh-Hamo.
- The Story Must Continue by Muharrem Erbey; translated from the Turkish by Andrew Penny.
- I Have Seen Many Houses in my Time by Karzan Kardozi.
- Arzela by Meral Şimşek; translated from the Turkish by Andrew Penny.
- The Last Hope by Qadir Agid; translated from the Kurmanji by Kate Ferguson and Dibar Çelik
- The Snuffed-Out Candle by Jahangir Mahmoudveysi; translated from the Sorani by Darya Najim and Khazan Jangiz.
- Cleaners of the World by Hüseyin Karabey; translated from the Turkish by Mustafa Gündoğdu
- Rising Like Water by Omer Dilsoz; translated from the Kurmanji by Rojin Shekh-Hamo.
- The Age of the Iron Locusts by Yıldız Cakar; translated from the Kurmanji by Harriet Paintin.

The work concludes with an afterword by the editors followed by brief biographies of the authors and translators.

== Reviews ==
- Salih, S. (3 April 2024), Kurdistan+100: Futuristic anthology reimagines Kurdish state, The New Arab
- Broomfield, M. (28 November 2023), "First Kurdish Sci-Fi Collection is Rooted in the Past", The Markaz Report
- "Kurdistan+100: Thirteen stories for a possible future", ANF News, 2 November 2023
- Lynx Qualey, M. (13 November 2023), "Kurdistan + 100: Futuristic fiction anthology focuses on Kurdistan", Qantara.de

== Publication history ==
- 2023, hardcover
- 2024, ebook

== See also ==
- Kurdish literature
