= Frankfurter Anthologie =

- Country: Germany
- Language: German
- Genre: Poetry, Literary criticism
- Publisher: Insel Verlag (1974–2010); S. Fischer Verlag (2010–present)
- Published: 1974–present
- Media type: Newspaper column (Frankfurter Allgemeine Zeitung), Book series

The Frankfurter Anthologie is a collection of German poetry and accompanying commentaries, instituted by Marcel Reich-Ranicki in 1974 in the Frankfurter Allgemeine Zeitung, of which he was then literary editor, and overseen by him until his death in 2013.

== Publication History ==
Each Saturday the newspaper prints a poem chosen by a poet, critic, or other literary figure who also contributes an explanation of the poem and of why they consider it good. Each year the poems and commentaries are collected in book-form, published until 2010 by Insel Verlag, and since then by S. Fischer Verlag. In 2013 the 36th volume was published bringing the number of poems in the anthology to almost 2,000.

== Purpose and Philosophy ==
Reich-Ranicki's purpose was to promote German poetry by regularly putting it in front of a wider audience, "that part of our readership – and be it only a minority – which is not yet indifferent to the art of poetry". He particularly intended to include a characteristic poem from new volumes by contemporary poets, but thought it essential also to recall poetry from the past. The first poem was by Johann Wolfgang von Goethe, with commentary by Benno von Wiese, the second by Cyrus Atabay, with commentary by Marie Luise Kaschnitz. Introducing the anthology, he gave the project the motto "Der Dichtung eine Gasse" (literally "An alleyway to poetry").

== Selection Criteria ==
Only published poems, from whatever era, would be considered, preferably from a volume currently available in bookshops. The commentaries were to be personal essays accessible to the wider public to inspire them to approach the poem. The only other conditions were dictated by the space available in the newspaper: the poem could not be longer than thirty lines, the commentary not longer than sixty lines in manuscript.

== Contributors and Poets ==
To date (2013), works from more than 350 poets have been included, Goethe, Heine and Brecht being amongst the most frequent. But the series has also been a forum for contemporary poets. Commentators have included Erich Fried, Peter Härtling, Robert Gernhardt, Wolfgang Koeppen, Golo Mann, Ulla Hahn, Hans Magnus Enzensberger and Siegfried Lenz.

In 2011 Reich-Ranicki recalled that editorial colleagues were initially sceptical about the undertaking, expecting only three or four poems to appear before the anthology was quietly buried, but the sales figures show that there is a real market for such a publishing venture; many volumes remain in print, some have even been re-issued. The anthology has become a national institution.

== Preis der Frankfurter Anthologie ==
In 1998 the Frankfurter Allgemeine Zeitung established an annual prize of €10,000 for the contributor to the Frankfurter Anthologie who "by their commentary on individual poems have most contributed to the appreciation of German poetry through the ages". Prize winners have been:

- 1998: Peter von Matt
- 1999: Ruth Klüger
- 2000: Wolfgang Werth
- 2001: Wulf Segebrecht
- 2002: Harald Hartung
- 2004: Hans Christoph Buch
- 2005: Ludwig Harig
- 2006: not awarded
- 2007: Hans-Ulrich Treichel
- 2008: Eva Demski
- 2009: Ulrich Weinzierl
- 2011: Günter Kunert

(This list was copied from the German Wikipedia Frankfurter Anthologie article).
