= Where Is Gilgamesh? =

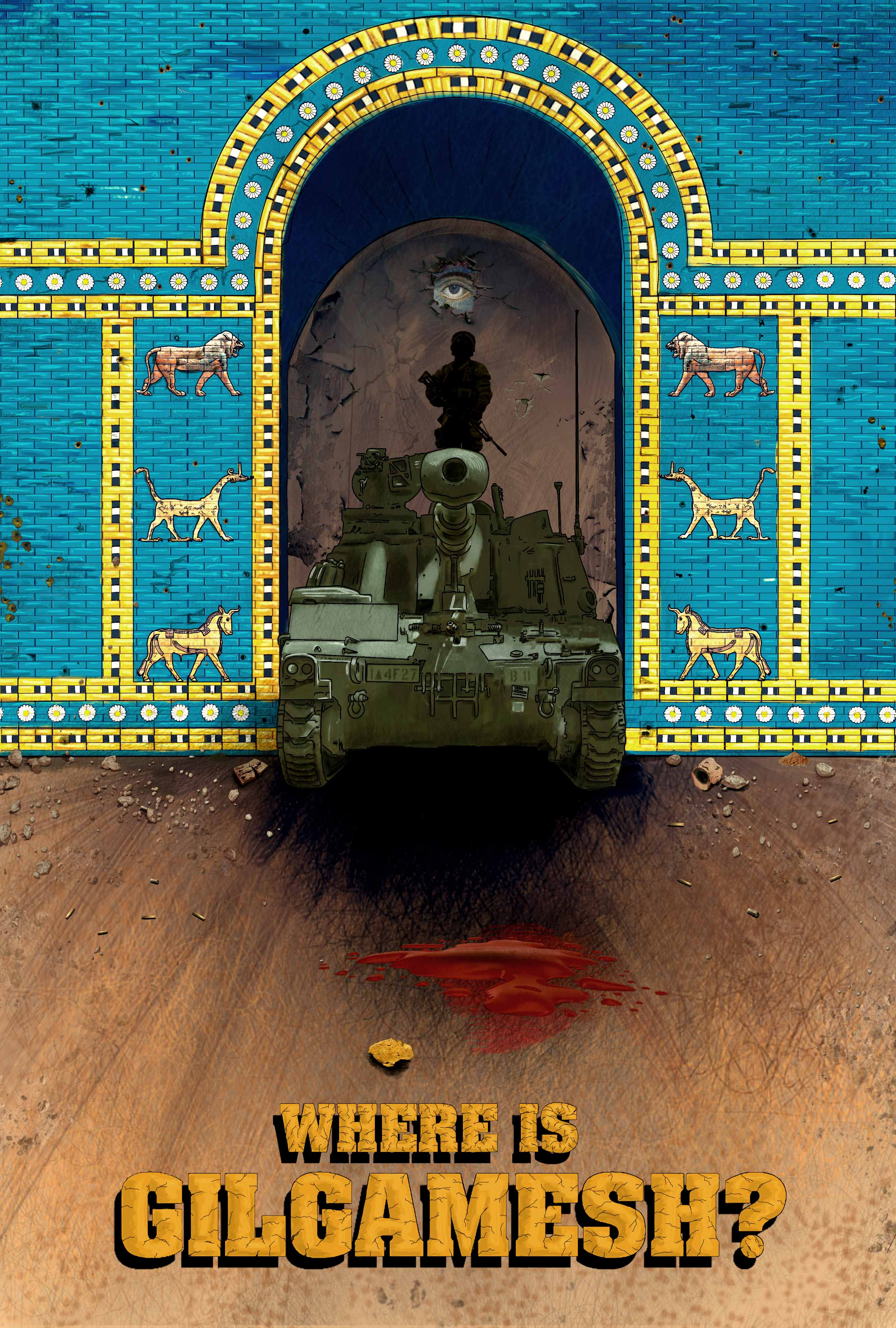
- Sorani Kurdish: گێلگامێش لە کوێیە؟
- Directed by: Karzan Kardozi
- Written by: Karzan Kardozi
- Produced by: Karzan Kardozi
- Starring: Barzan Yunis; Goran Dlshad; Ragash Kizhan; Taha Mohamad
- Cinematography: Lana Diyar
- Distributed by: Kardozi Production
- Release date: 1 February 2024
- Running time: 90 minutes
- Countries: Iraq, Kurdistan Region
- Language: Kurdish

Where Is Gilgamesh? (Sorani Kurdish: گێلگامێش لە کوێیە؟) is a 2024 Kurdish heist crime film noir based on the Epic of Gilgamesh, directed by Karzan Kardozi.

== Plot ==
Tablet V of the Epic of Gilgamesh is stolen from a museum by a group of smugglers. Govan, a museum security guard, attempts to recover the stolen artifact and prevent its illicit sale at an auction in City of London. In the process, he becomes entangled with a secretive society that adheres to ancient Mesopotamian beliefs dating back to the early Sumerian period.

== Cast ==
- Barzan Yunis as Govan (Gilgamesh)
- Goran Dlshad as Akam (Enkidu)
- Ragash Kizhan as Avin (Inanna)
- Taha Mohamad as Avin's Father (Enlil)
- Yasin Omar as Haji Hazo (Humbaba)

== Production ==
The film was shot with a small crew of seven people with a budget of $9000, funded and produced by the director himself. The 29-day shoot took place entirely in Sulaymaniyah, Kurdistan Region. Many scenes were filmed inside the Sulaymaniyah Museum. The newly discovered Tablet V of the Epic of Gilgamesh, housed at the Museum, makes an appearance in the film.

== Karzan Kardozi ==
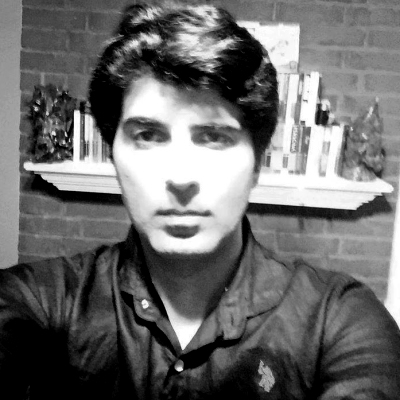
Karzan Kardozi

Karzan Kardozi (Sorani Kurdish: کارزان کاردۆزی); born 2 May 1983) is a Kurdish American film director, writer and producer, best known for Where Is Gilgamesh?.

Kardozi was born in Sulaymaniyah, Kurdistan Region, and left with his family in 1999 due to war and conflict. They settled in the United States, in Nashville, Tennessee, where Kardozi studied film directing. In 2010, Karzan graduated from Watkins College of Art, Design & Film with a BA in Film Directing and Cinematography, and in 2014 received Master in Film Production with Distinction from University of Central Lancashire.

In 2015, Karzan returned to Kurdistan to direct the documentary film I Want to Live, about the lives of Kurdish refugees from Syria. The film was shot on a budget of $400. In 2023, Karzan directed his first feature film, Where Is Gilgamesh, a film noir based on the Epic of Gilgamesh. The film was shot on location in Kurdistan with a crew of five and a budget of $9,000. His upcoming science fiction feature, Anfa 8, is scheduled for release in the summer of 2026.

=== Films ===
- A Walking Shadow (2007)
- A Day in the Country (2008)
- Greed Eats the Soul (2009)
- The Arcturian (2013)
- A Viewer on a Movie Projector (2014)
- Yilmaz Guney: Rebel with a Cause (2014)
- I Want To Live (2015)
- Where is Gilgamesh? (2024)
- Anfa 8 (2026)

=== Publications ===
- Kardozi, Karzan (2018). Yılmaz Güney (900 pages, Xazalnus)
- Kardozi, Karzan (2019). 100 Years of Cinema, 100 Directors, Vol 1: Lumière, Georges Méliès, Louis Feuillade (1076 pages, Xazalnus)
- Kardozi, Karzan (2019). 100 Years of Cinema, 100 Directors, Vol 2: D.W. Griffith, Charles Chaplin (1100 pages, Xazalnus)
- Kardozi, Karzan (2020). 100 Years of Cinema, 100 Directors, Vol 3: Buster Keaton, Robert Flaherty, Carl Dreyer (1250 pages, Xazalnus)
- Kardozi, Karzan (2020). 100 Years of Cinema, 100 Directors, Vol 4: Eric von Stroheim, Fritz Lang (1400 pages, Xazalnus)
- Kardozi, Karzan (2024). 100 Years of Cinema, 100 Directors, Vol 5: Abel Gance, Jean Epstein (900 pages, Xazalnus)
- Kardozi, Karzan (2024). 100 Years of Cinema, 100 Directors, Vol 6: F.W. Murnau, G.W. Pabst (998 pages, Xazalnus)
- Kardozi, Karzan (2024). 100 Years of Cinema, 100 Directors, Vol 7: Ernst Lubitsch, Josef von Sternberg (1130 pages, Xazalnus)
- Kardozi, Karzan (2024). 100 Years of Cinema, 100 Directors, Vol 8: Kenji Mizoguchi (988 pages, Xazalnus)
- Kardozi, Karzan (2024). 100 Years of Cinema, 100 Directors, Vol 9: Akira Kurosawa (1178 pages, Xazalnus)
- Kardozi, Karzan (2024). 100 Years of Cinema, 100 Directors, Vol 10: Yasujiro Ozu (1148 pages, Xazalnus)
- Kurdistan +100: Stories from a Future State (Comma Press, 2023)

== Gallery ==
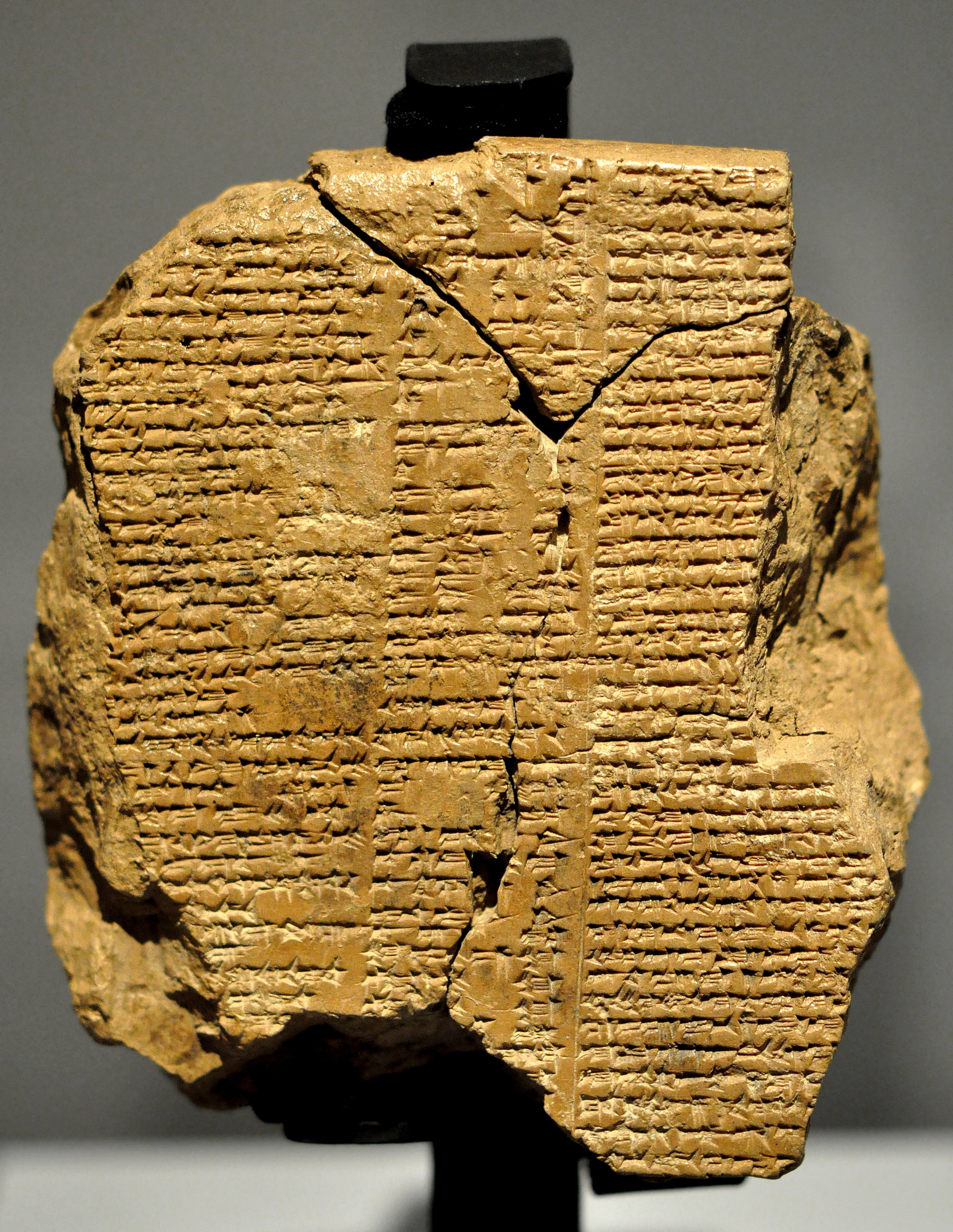
Front Side of the newly discovered Tablet V of the Epic of Gilgamesh. It dates back to the old Babylonian period, 2003–1595 BCE and is currently housed in the Sulaymaniyah Museum, Iraq.

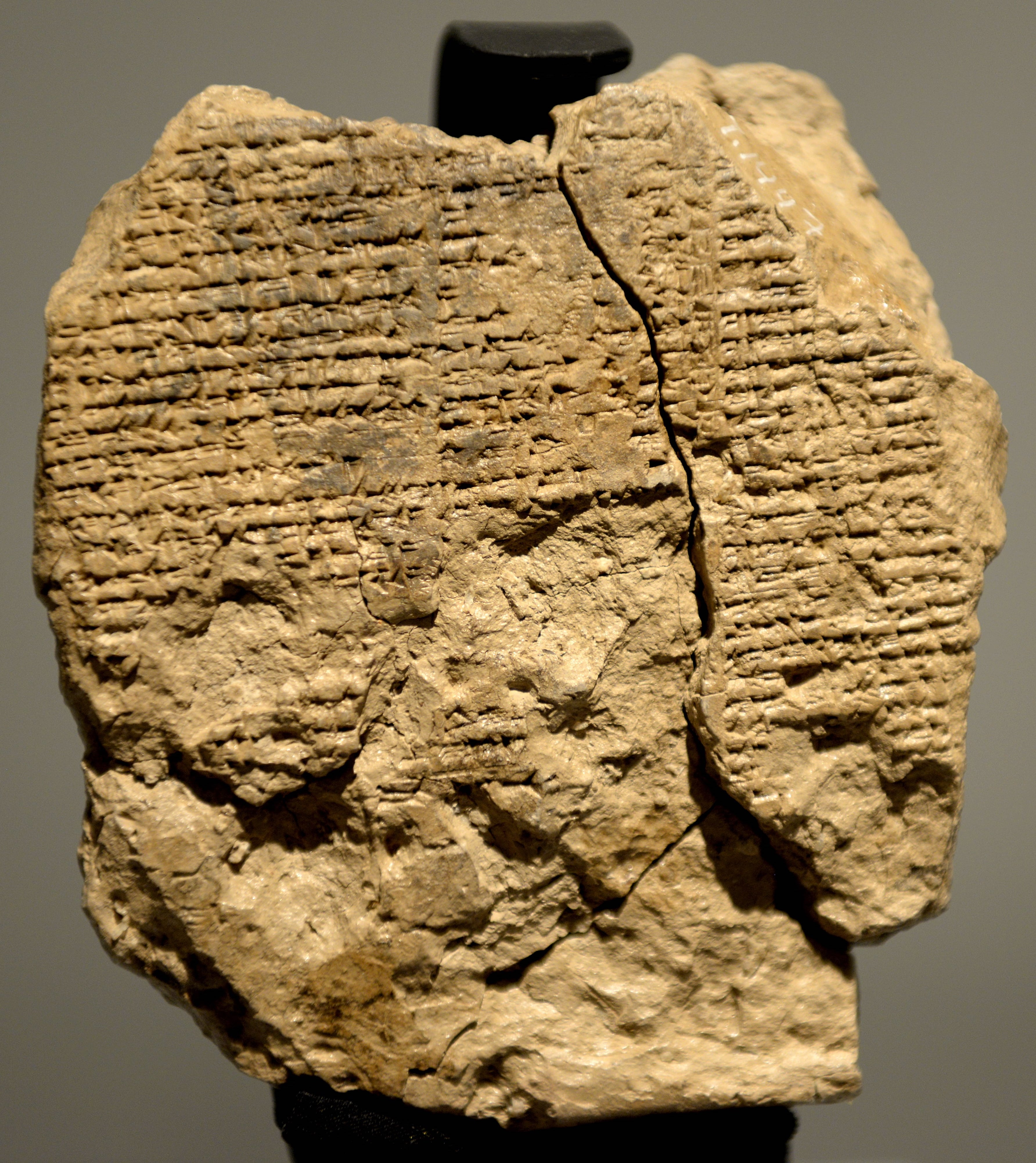
Reverse side of Tablet V of the Epic of Gilgamesh.
