= Johannes Sass =

German linguist (1889–1971)

Johannes Sass (also in German: Saß) born 4 September 1889 in Hamburg, died 31 December 1971) was a linguist who specialized in the Low German language. He obtained his doctorate in 1926 from the University of Hamburg.

== Significance in Low German ==
Although Low German has no official written form, Sass's dictionary of the language holds a similar authoritative place for the language that the Duden dictionary does for the Standard High German language.

The diverse writing systems for Low German caused Sass to develop his spelling rules which he published in 1935. In 1956 this led to the Fehrs-Gilde, an organization promoting the Low German language, producing the 'Rules for Low German spelling', which mainly followed the example of the orthography laid down by Sass.

The Johannes-Saß-Preis (Johannes Sass Prize) for scientific works about Low German is named after Sass.
