= Raphael Urweider =

Swiss writer and musician

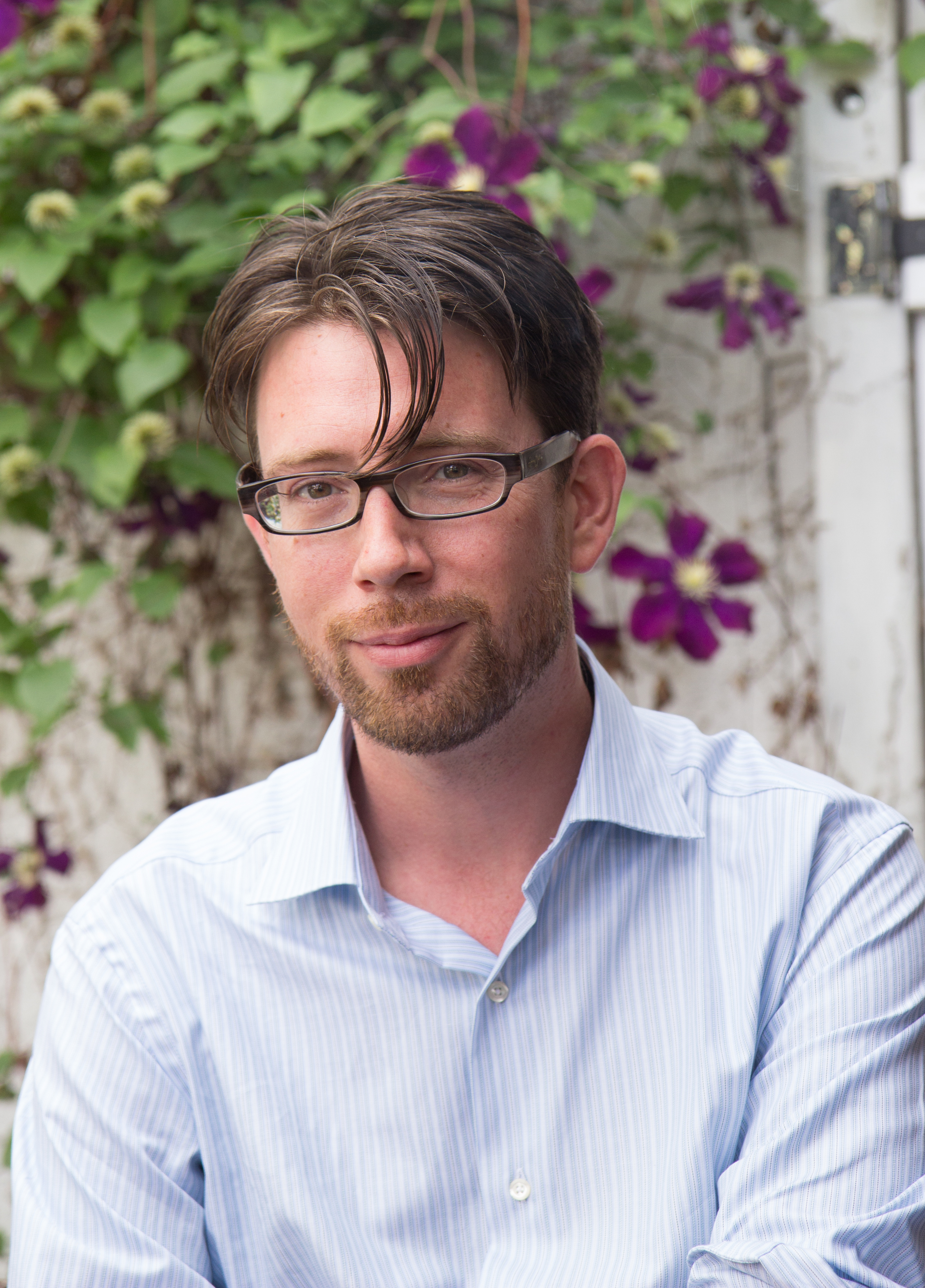
Raphael Urweider at the Hausacher Leselenz 2013

Raphael Bendicht Urweider (born 5 November 1974 in Bern, Switzerland), is a writer in English and German and a musician.

== Career ==
Raphael Urweider is the son of a reformed minister. He studied German literature and philosophy at the University of Fribourg. He performed with LDeeP and has composed music for a number of plays. He also worked on two plays with Samuel Schwarz – Maxim Gorki Theatre and Deutsches Schauspielhaus (Hamburg). His first volume of poetry, Light in Menlo Park, was published in 2000. He subsequently published "Kobold and the Kunstpfeifer" in 2002, "The opposite of meat" in 2003, and "Poems of craze and longing" in 2008. He has also translated plays and poetry.

== Awards ==
In 1999, he received the Arbeitsstipendium des Deutschen Literaturfonds and the Leonce-und-Lena-Preis. In 2001, he was awarded the Förderpreis des Bremer Literaturpreises, the 3sat award at the Ingeborg Bachmann Competition in 2002, and the Clemens-Brentano-Preis in 2004. In 2009, he received the 'Schillerpreis' for his poetry in 'Alle deine Namen'.
