= Hans-Ulrich Treichel =

Germanist, novelist and poet (born 1952)

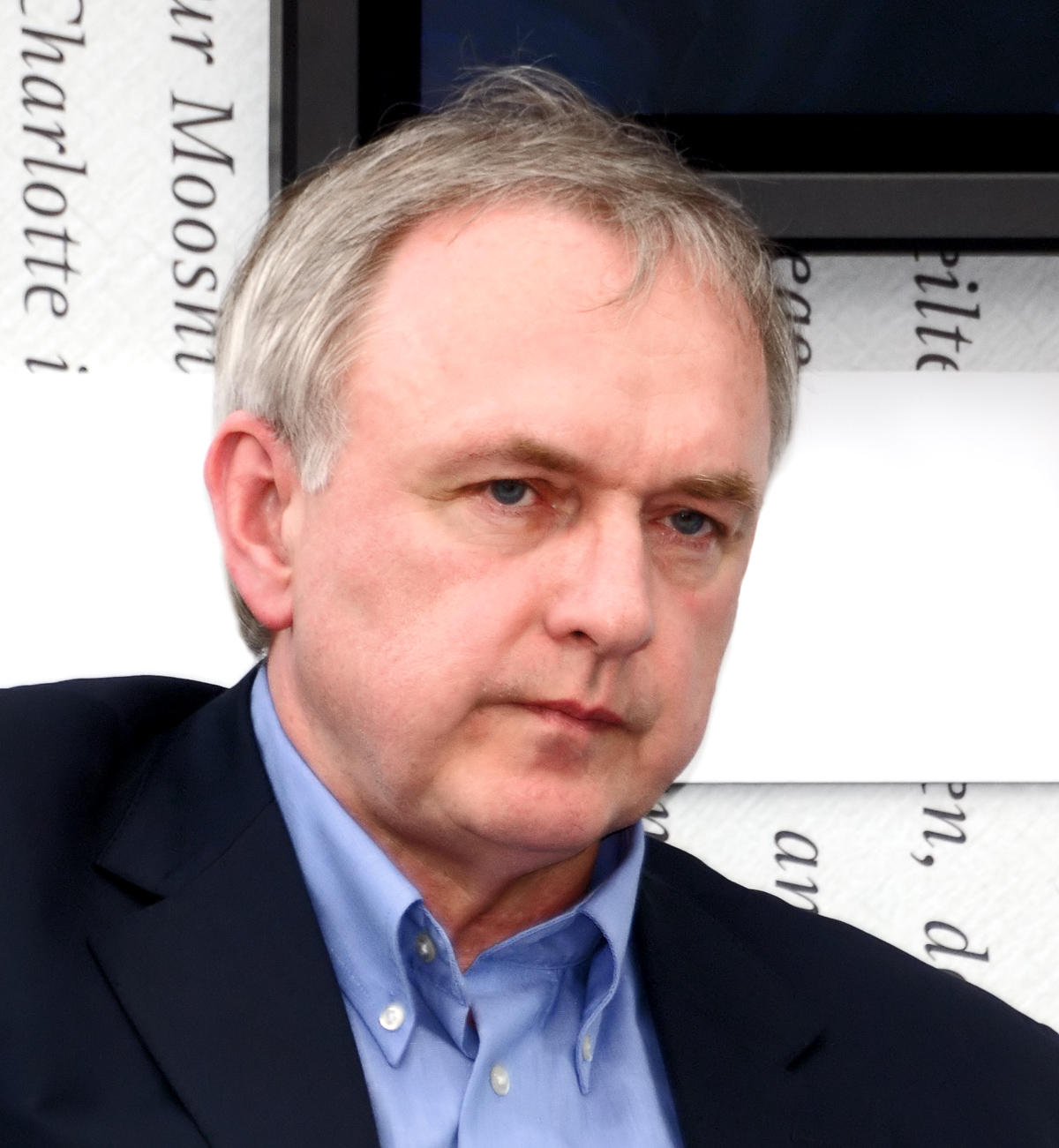
- Born: August 12, 1952 (age 74); Versmold, Northrhine-Westphalia, West Germany
- Education: Free University of Berlin
- Occupations: Author; Germanist; Poet
- Writing career
- Notable awards: Preis der Frankfurter Anthologie (2007); Deutscher Kritikerpreis (2006); Eichendorff-Literaturpreis (2006); Hermann Hesse Award (2005); Margarete Schrader Award (2003); Literature Prize of the city of Bremen (1993); Leonce-und-Lena-Preis (1985)

Hans-Ulrich Treichel (born 12 August 1952) is a Germanist, novelist and poet. His earliest published books were collections of poetry, but prose writing has become a larger part of his output since the critical and commercial success of his first novel Der Verlorene (translated into English as Lost). Treichel has also worked as an opera librettist, most prominently in collaboration with the composer Hans Werner Henze.

== Early life and education ==
Hans-Ulrich Treichel was born in Versmold in Westphalia in 1952 and lived there until 1968. After graduating from high school in Hanau, he studied German philology, philosophy and political science at the Free University of Berlin, where he earned his degree in 1983 with a thesis on Wolfgang Koeppen. He habilitated in 1993 and from 1995 to March 2018 taught as Professor for German literature at the Deutsche Literaturinstitut Leipzig. (German literature institute)

== Career ==
Treichel became known in particular through his novel The Lost (Der Verlorene), in which he set the flight of his parents from the "Eastern Territories" and the loss of their first-born son towards the end of World War II about his own childhood and youth. In 1995 he became Professor at the German Literature Institute (Deutsche Literatur Institut) Leipzig and retired in 2018.

Treichel is a member of the PEN Center Germany.

== Awards and honours ==
- 1985 Leonce-und-Lena-Preis
- 1993 Literature Prize of the city of Bremen
- 2003 Annette von Droste Hülshoff Award
- 2003 Margarete Schrader Award
- 2005 Hermann Hesse Award
- 2006 Eichendorff-Literaturpreis und Deutscher Kritikerpreis
- 2007 Preis der Frankfurter Anthologie

== Works ==
=== Poetry ===
- A remnant future. Poems. Edition New ways, Berlin (West) 1979, ISBN 3-88348-024-X.
- Tarantella, poems. Schmid, Berlin 1982, ISBN 3-922880-12-6.
- From the time of silence. 9 songs for Arthur Rimbaud, An oratorio. Edition Dieter Wagner, Berlin 1984.
- Love distress. Poems. Suhrkamp, Frankfurt am Main 1986, ISBN 3-518-11373-9.
- No wonder for days. Poems. Suhrkamp, Frankfurt am Main 1990, ISBN 978-3-518-11610-4.
- The only guest, poems. Frankfurt / Main: Suhrkamp, 1994, ISBN 3-518-11904-4.
- Conversation under trees, collected poems. Hg. with a Nachw. v. Rainer Weiss. Suhrkamp, Frankfurt am Main 2002, ISBN 978-3-518-39900-2.
- South room Leipzig. Poems. Suhrkamp, Frankfurt am Main 2007, ISBN 978-3-518-41873-4.

=== Prose ===
- Body and soul, reports. Suhrkamp, Frankfurt am Main 1992, ISBN 3-518-39424-X.
- Local or Everything is cheerful and noble, sightseeing. Suhrkamp, Frankfurt am Main 1996, TB: ISBN 3-518-39611-0.
- The lost. Novel. Suhrkamp, Frankfurt am Main 1998, TB: ISBN 3-518-39561-0.
- Tristan chord. Novel. Suhrkamp, Frankfurt am Main 2000, TB: ISBN 3-518-45617-2.
- The earthly cupid. Novel. Frankfurt / Main: Suhrkamp, Frankfurt / Main 2002, TB: ISBN 3-518-45603-2.
- Human flight. Novel. Suhrkamp, Frankfurt am Main 2005, ISBN 3-518-41712-6.
- The Pope I knew. Narrative. Suhrkamp, Frankfurt am Main 2007, ISBN 978-3-518-41932-8.
- Anatolin. Novel. Suhrkamp, 2008, ISBN 978-3-518-41959-5.
- Grunewaldsee. Novel. Suhrkamp, Berlin 2010, ISBN 978-3-518-42136-9.
- My Sardinia. A Lovestory. Mare-Verlag, Hamburg 2012, ISBN 978-3-86648-138-1.
- Early disorder. Novel. Suhrkamp, Berlin 2014, ISBN 978-3-518-42422-3.
- Breaking Dawn. Narrative. Suhrkamp, Berlin 2016, ISBN 978-3-518-42525-1.

=== Literary studies, essays ===
- Fragment without end, a study on Wolfgang Koeppen. Heidelberg: Winter, 1984, ISBN 978-3-533-03555-8 .
- Erasure, Exemplary Investigations on Literature and Modern Poetics. Fink, Munich 1995, ISBN 978-3-7705-3015-1 .
- Beyond writing, essays on literature. Frankfurt / Main: Suhrkamp, 2000, ISBN 3-518-12144-8 .
- The author's design, Frankfurt Poetics Lectures. Suhrkamp, Frankfurt am Main 2000, ISBN 3-518-12193-6 .
- The rock on which I hang, essays and other texts. Suhrkamp, Frankfurt am Main 2005, ISBN 978-3-518-22389-5.

=== Libretti ===
- Le Précepteur (after The Hofmeister [1774] by Jakob Michael Reinhold Lenz). Music: Michèle Reverdy. 14 May 1990 Munich ( Gasteig, Carl Orff Hall, 2nd Munich Biennale )
- The betrayed sea. (1986/1989). Music drama in 2 acts (after the novel Gogo no eiko ("The sailor who betrayed the sea") by Yukio Mishima ). Music: Hans Werner Henze . Schott, Mainz and others 1990, ISBN 3-7957-3365-0 . UA 5 May 1990 Berlin ( Deutsche Oper )
  - Recast (2003/2005): Gogo no Eiko ("The Betrayed Sea") . Music drama in 2 acts. Music: Hans Werner Henze. UA 15 October 2003 Tokyo ( Suntory Hall, Yomiuri-Nippon Symphony Orchestra )
- Venus and Adonis. Opera in one act for singers and dancers. Music: Hans Werner Henze. Schott, Mainz et al. 1997, ISBN 3-7957-3367-7 . UA 11 January 1997 Munich ( Bavarian State Opera, National Theater )
- Sinfonia N. 9. For mixed choir and orchestra. Seal on Anna Seghers ' novel The Seventh Cross . Music: Hans Werner Henze. UA 11 September 1997 Berlin ( Philharmonic, Berliner Philharmoniker )
- Caligula. Opera in 4 acts (free after the same piece [1938] by Albert Camus ). Music: Detlev Glanert . Boosey & Hawkes / Bote & Bock: Berlin 2006. UA 7 October 2006 Frankfurt ( Opera )

=== Editions ===
- Cityscapes. Poems of West Berlin authors. Hg. Together with Peter Gerlinghoff and Günther Maschuff. Berlin 1977.
- Wolfgang Koeppen: Collected works in six volumes. Hg. Together with Marcel Reich-Ranicki and Dagmar von Briel. Frankfurt am Main 1986.
- The strangeness of language, studies on the literature of modernity. Hg. Together with Jochen Sagittarius and Dietmar Voss. Berlin 1988, ISBN 978-3-88619-177-2 .
- Wolfgang Koeppen. One of the writes: Conversations and interviews, Frankfurt / Main: Suhrkamp, 1995. ISBN 3-518-38950-5 .
- Landscape with traces of light. New texts from Saxony. Ed. V. Saxon Literature Council e. V. Editors together with Kerstin Keller-Loibl, Helgard Rost u. Jörg Schieke. Reclam, Leipzig 1999, ISBN 978-3-379-01654-4
- How do I become a damn good writer? Reports from the workshop. Hg. Together with Josef Haslinger. Suhrkamp, Frankfurt am Main 2005; TB ISBN 978-3-518-12395-9 .
- Learn to Write – Teach Writing. Hg. Together with Josef Haslinger . Fischer, Frankfurt am Main 2006; TB ISBN 978-3-596-16967-2 .
- Wolfgang Koeppen: love stories. Hg. And with an afterword. Frankfurt am Main 2006, ISBN 978-3-518-45761-0 .
- Wolfgang Koeppen: Works. Frankfurt am Main 2006 ff. (Already published: Volume 4. Pigeons in the grass, a novel by Hans-Ulrich Treichel, Frankfurt / Main 2006 ISBN 3-518-41804-1, volume 1. An unfortunate love . Hg v. Jörg Döring Frankfurt am Main 2007, ISBN 978-3-518-41801-7 .)

=== Audiobooks ===
- Human flight . Read by Leonard Lansink, Der Audio Verlag (DAV), Berlin, 2006, ISBN 978-3-89813-512-2 (reading, 4 CDs, 317 min.)

=== Interviews ===
- Hans-Ulrich Treichel: I didn't understand what the "good Russians" really mean, Interviews with exceptional minds, Eximia

== Personal life ==
Treichel lives in Berlin and Leipzig.
