= Nina George =

German writer (born 1973)

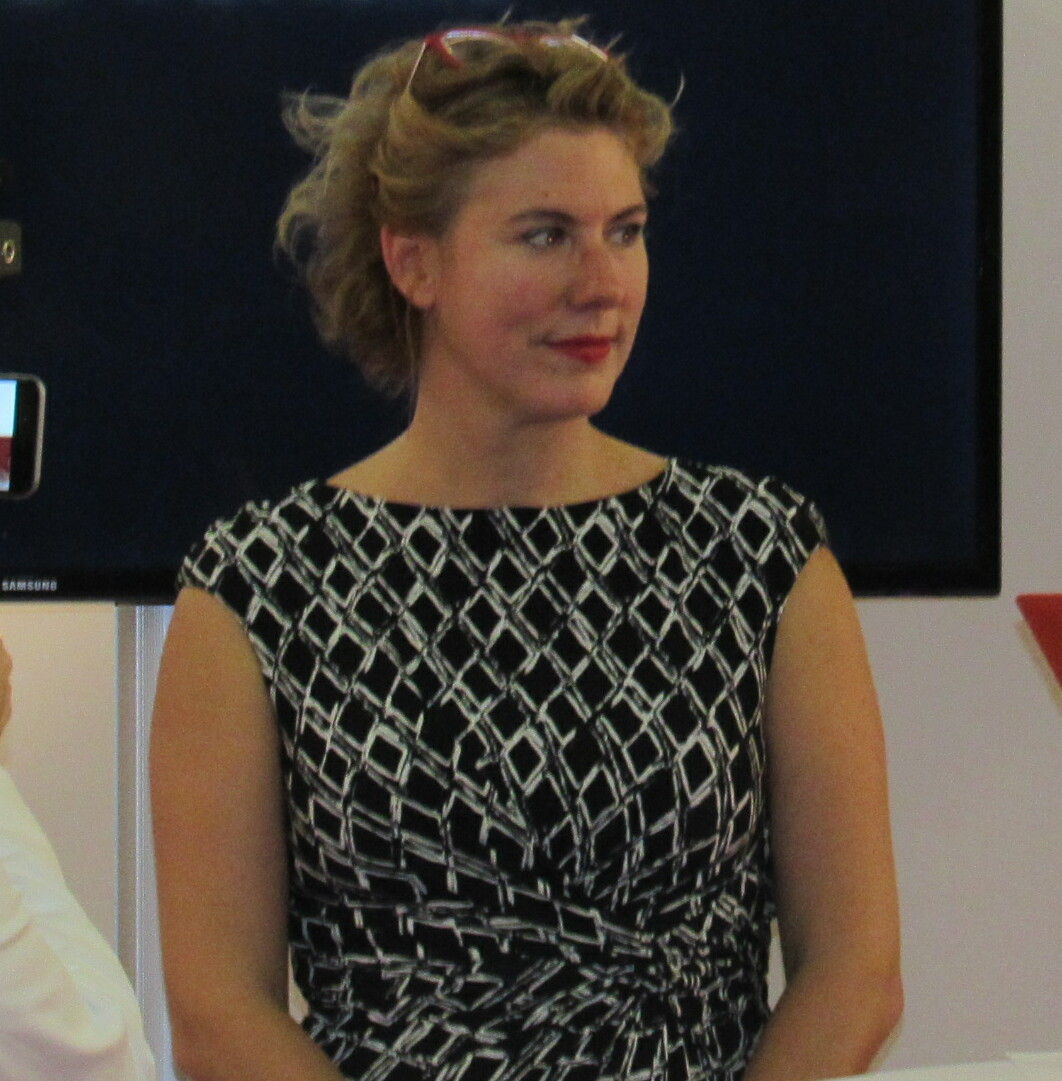
- Nina George in 2017
- Born: 30 August 1973 (age 53); Bielefeld, West Germany
- Occupations: Novelist, journalist
- Website: www.nina-george.com

Nina George (born 30 August 1973) is a German writer. She is best known for her first bestselling novel The Little Paris Bookshop (first published in German as Das Lavendelzimmer in 2013), which has been translated into more than 28 languages as of 2015, and sold more than 500.000 copies. She has published 26 books (novels, mysteries and non-fiction) as well as over hundred short stories and more than 600 columns. George has worked as a cop reporter, columnist and managing editor for a wide range of publications, including Hamburger Abendblatt, Die Welt, Der Hamburger, as well as TV Movie and Federwelt.

George writes also under three pen names. She writes non-fiction about issues of love, sexuality and eroticism, under the pseudonym Anne West. Under her married name Nina Kramer she wrote a thriller in 2008. She also wrote detective novels with her husband and co-writer Jo Kramer, their pseudonym being Jean Bagnol.

George is a member of the administrative board of the Collective Management Organisation VG Wort. She is chairwoman of the VG-Wort ‘e-Book’ working group.

== Life and work ==
Nina George was born in Bielefeld. She dropped out of school before finishing high school and worked in various catering establishments from the age of fourteen. She began in 1992 writing as a freelance journalist and columnist for magazines like Cosmopolitan, Penthouse, TV Movie, and Frau im Trend. In 1998, she wrote the book Good girls do it in bed, bad ones everywhere under the pseudonym Anne West. She lived in Hamburg. In 2008, she appeared under the name Nina Kramer in 'Thriller A Life Without Me' about women's reproductive health.

George is Member to PEN, Das Syndikat (association of German-language crime writers), the Association of German Authors (VS), the Hamburg Authors’ Association (HAV), BücherFrauen (Women in Publishing), the IACW/AIEP (International Association of Crime Writers), the GEDOK (Association of female artists in Germany), PRO QUOTE and Lean In. Nina George sits on the board of the Three Seas Writers’ and Translators’ Council (TSWTC), whose members come from 16 different countries.

In 2014, she delivered the keynote address in Berlin at the German Writer’s Conference to 140 attending writers.

Nina George teaches writing at Literaturbüro Unna, Alsterdamm Kunstschule and Wilhelmsburger Honigfabrik, where she coaches young people, adults and professional authors.

After her father's death, she wrote semi-autobiographical novel The Little Paris Bookshop, which talks about bibliotherapy, the fear of death and how this fear holds us back from living life to the fullest, the mourning process, and travel on river boat from Paris in the Canal latéral à la Loire, via Literary Sanary, to the south of Provence. There are meta-literary references to many famous literary works and authors in her novel, including Erich Kästner's idea of a list of books as remedies for different afflictions. At the end there's an appendix where she offers an alphabetical list of books and what she recommends them for, starting with The Hitchhiker's Guide to the Galaxy by Douglas Adams. She finds inspiration for writing in reading Jon Kalman Stefansson, Anna Gavalda, Dominique Manotti, Erica Jong, and Dorothea Brande.

In 2017, she was elected to the VS national board and BücherFrauen named her "BücherFrau des Jahres 2017".

In 2022, she co-founded PEN Berlin.

== Personal life ==
She moved to Concarneau in France, where she now lives with her husband Jo Kramer.

== Works ==
=== Books as Nina George ===
- 2025 Beautiful Nights, a novel
- 2023 The Little French Village of Book Lovers, a novel, ISBN 978-1-405-94517-2
- 2019 The Book of Dreams, a novel
- 2017 The Little Breton Bistro, a novel
- 2013 The Little Paris Bookshop, a novel, Crown, ISBN 9780553418774
- 2010 The Moon Player, Knaur, ISBN 3-426-66336-8 - awarded the Delia 2011 - literary prize for the best German romance of the previous year by the Friends of German romance literature
- 2008 How the Hell, Fischer, Frankfurt, ISBN 3-596-17435-X .
- 2005 The Vocabulary of Men, Lappan, ISBN 3-8303-3123-1 .
- 2003 The Way of the Warrior, Droemer Knaur, ISBN 3-426-27309-8 .
- 2003 Jack, Queen, Checked, Death, Hamburger Abendblatt, ISBN 3-921305-12-8 .
- 2001 No Sex, No Beer and Lots of Dead, Droemer Knaur, ISBN 3-426-61844-3 .

=== Books as Anne West ===
- 2009 What Women Dream and How To Get It, Droemer Knaur, ISBN 3-426-78338-X
- 2009 Sex for advanced skiers, Droemer Knaur, ISBN 3-426-78222-7
- 2009 Feeling - the feeling, Droemer Knaur, ISBN 3-426-78023-2
- 2009 Absolute Sex, Droemer Knaur, ISBN 3-426-78236-7
- 2007 Sex Goddesses Manual, Droemer Knaur, ISBN 3-426-77953-6
- 2006 One Day Sex, Knaur, ISBN 3-426-64448-7
- 2006 The Venus Effect, Droemer Knaur, ISBN 3-426-77900-5
- 2005 First Aid For Those in Love, Droemer Knaur, ISBN 3-426-77764-9
- 2004 Dirty Stories, Droemer Knaur, ISBN 3-426-62672-1
- 2003 Kamasutra Without Hernia, as co-author. Droemer Knaur, ISBN 3-426-62288-2
- 2003 Why Men Are So Quick and Women Just Pretend, Droemer Knaur, ISBN 3-426-62468-0
- 1998 Good Girls Do It in Bed - Bad Ones Everywhere, Droemer Knaur, ISBN 3-426-60930-4

=== Books as Jean Bagnol ===
- Commissaire Mazan and the blind angel, Droemer Knaur, 2015 ISBN 978-3426516539
- Commissaire Mazan and the heirs of the Marquis, Droemer Knaur, 2013 ISBN 978-3426514238

== Awards ==
In 2012 and 2013 she won the DeLiA Literature Award and the Glauser Prize.
