= Peter von Matt =

Swiss philologist and author (1937–2025)

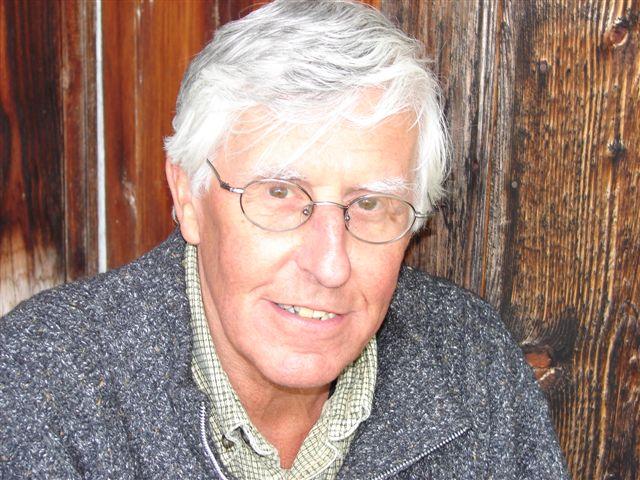
- Matt in 2008
- Born: 20 May 1937
- Died: 21 April 2025 (aged 87)

Peter von Matt (20 May 1937 – 21 April 2025) was a Swiss philologist, specialist in German studies, and author. He was an authority in literary education.

== Life and career ==
Born in Lucerne on 20 May 1937, Peter von Matt grew up in Stans in the canton of Nidwalden. He studied art history as well as German and English studies in Zurich and received a doctorate with Emil Staiger on Franz Grillparzer. In 1970, he received his post doctorate lecturing qualifications with a work on E. T. A. Hoffmann.

From 1976 to 2002, von Matt taught at the University of Zurich as a Professor of Newer German Literature. He was a guest professor at Stanford University in 1980 and a Fellow of the Institute for Advanced Study, Berlin in 1992/93. Von Matt was a member of the Deutsche Akademie für Sprache und Dichtung, the Berlin-Brandenburg Academy of Sciences and Humanities, the Academia Europaea, the Göttingen Academy of Sciences and Humanities, and the Sächsische Akademie der Künste (Saxon Academy of the Arts). He wrote regular contributions for the Frankfurter Anthologie. He regularly appeared on Marcel Reich-Ranicki's literary talk show Literarisches Quartett on German public television. Reich-Ranicki once called von Matt the "best writer of German-speaking Switzerland". Von Matt was a friend of Max Frisch. In his essays, von Matt also wrote on social and political issues, and explored the European identity and the Swiss soul. In a legendary appearance at the Ingeborg Bachmann Prize in 1991, von Matt protested against prejudices towards Swiss literature: "As soon as a Swiss person reads, it is immediately said that they have a tongue like a forest snail". In his book Liebesverrat : die Treulosen in der Literatur, he guided entertainingly through love dramas in world literature.

He was married to literary critic Beatrice von Matt-Albrecht and lived with her in Dübendorf near Zurich.

Von Matt died in Zurich on 21 April 2025, at the age of 87.

== Works ==
- Matt, Peter von (2000). ...fertig ist das Angesicht : zur Literaturgeschichte des menschlichen Gesichts [...the Face is done. About the Literary History of the human Faces] (in German). München: Deutscher Taschenbuch Verlag. ISBN 3-423-30769-2. OCLC 48476997.
- —— (2004). Liebesverrat : die Treulosen in der Literatur [Romantic Treachery - The Faithless in Literatur] (in German). München: Dt. Taschenbuch-Verl. ISBN 3-423-30143-0. OCLC 315917260.
- —— (1994). Das Schicksal der Phantasie : Studien zur deutschen Literatur [Fantasy's Fate. Studies about German Literature] (in German). München: C. Hanser. ISBN 3-446-17689-6. OCLC 30461651.
- —— (1997). Verkommene Söhne, missratene Töchter : Familiendesaster in der Literatur [Deteriorated Sons, Ill-bred Daughters. Family Disasters in Literature] (in German). München: Deutscher Taschenbuch Verlag. ISBN 3-423-30647-5. OCLC 40331948.
- —— (2001). Die verdächtige Pracht: Über Dichter und Gedichte [The suspicious Magnificence. About Poetry and Poems] (in German). München: dtv Verlagsgesellschaft. ISBN 978-3-423-30826-7. OCLC 76339467.
- —— (2001). Die tintenblauen Eidgenossen : über die literarische und politische Schweiz [The Ink-blue Swiss. About Swiss Literature and Poilics] (in German). München: Hanser. ISBN 3-446-20096-7. OCLC 48027990.
- —— (2003). Öffentliche Verehrung der Luftgeister : Reden zur Literatur [Public Worship and Air Ghosts] (in German). München: Hanser. ISBN 3-446-20379-6. OCLC 53057802.
- —— (2006). Die Intrige : Theorie und Praxis der Hinterlist [The Intrigue. Theories and Practice of Trickery] (in German). München: C. Hanser. ISBN 3-446-20731-7. OCLC 63514256.
- —— (2007). Das Wilde und die Ordnung : zur deutschen Literatur [The Wild and the Ordered. About German Literature] (in German). München: Hanser. ISBN 978-3-446-20840-7. OCLC 82149049. The Wild and the Ordered. About German Literature
- —— (2007). Der Entflammte : über Elias Canetti [The Inflamed. About Elias Canetti] (in German). [Zürich]: Nagel & Kimche. ISBN 978-3-312-00391-4. OCLC 82149035.
- —— (2012). Das Kalb vor der Gotthardpost : zur Literatur und Politik der Schweiz [The calf in front of the Gotthard post. About Swiss literature and politics] (in German). München: Carl Hanser Verlag. ISBN 978-3-446-23880-0. OCLC 775411398. Winner of the 2012 Swiss Book Prize.
- —— (3 October 2024). Recht, Gerechtigkeit und Sympathie (in German). Baden-Baden: BoD – Books on Demand. ISBN 978-3-03751-569-3.
- —— (30 January 2017). Sieben Küsse (in German). München: Carl Hanser Verlag. ISBN 978-3-446-25462-6. OCLC 973223487.
- —— (17 March 2017). Was ist ein Gedicht? (in German). Stuttgart: Reclam. ISBN 978-3-15-019444-7.
- —— (2017). Don Quijote reitet über alle Grenzen (in German). Basel: Schwabe Verl. ISBN 978-3-7965-3737-0.
- —— (20 February 2023). Übeltäter, trockne Schleicher, Lichtgestalten (in German). München: Hanser. ISBN 978-3-446-27616-1.

=== Thesis ===
- Matt, Peter von (1965). Der Grundriss von Grillparzers Bühnenkunst [The outline of Grillparzer's Pear Art] (dissertation) (in German). Zürich: Atlantis-Verlag. OCLC 1283696.
- —— (1971). Die Augen der Automaten; E.T.A. Hoffmanns Imaginationslehre als Prinzip seiner Erzählkunst [The Eye of the Machines. E. T. A. Hoffmann's Imagination Teaching as a Principle of his Narrative Art] (habilitation) (in German). Tübingen: M. Niemeyer. ISBN 3-484-18018-8. OCLC 324885.

== Awards ==
- 1991: Johann Heinrich Merck Prize for Literary Critique and Essay
- 1994: Johann-Peter-Hebel-Preis
- 1995: Innerschweizer Kulturpreis (Innerswiss Culture Prize)
- 1997: Order of Pour le Mérite for Science and Art
- 1998: Prize of the Frankfurter Anthologie
- 2000: Art Prize of the City of Zurich
- 2001: Friedrich Märker Prize for Essayists
- 2002: Prix Européen de l'Essai Charles Veillon (Lausanne)
- 2004: Deutscher Sprachpreis (German Language Prize)
- 2006: Heinrich Mann Prize
- 2007: Brothers Grimm Prize of the University of Marburg
- 2012: Swiss Book Prize for Das Kalb vor der Gotthardpost
- 2014: Goethe Prize
