= Berthold-Auerbach-Literaturpreis =

Berthold-Auerbach-Literaturpreis is a literary prize of 2,500 euros awarded in Baden-Württemberg, Germany. It is awarded every 5 years "for literary works that are thematically or stylistically in the tradition of Berthold Auerbach or for his ideals."

== Selected winners ==
- 1982 Klaus Dieter Lauer
- 1997 Walle Sayer
- 2002 Kurt Oesterle
- 2007 Egon Gramer
- 2012 Susann Pásztor
- 2017 Hermann Kinder
