= Leonce-und-Lena-Preis =

German literary prize

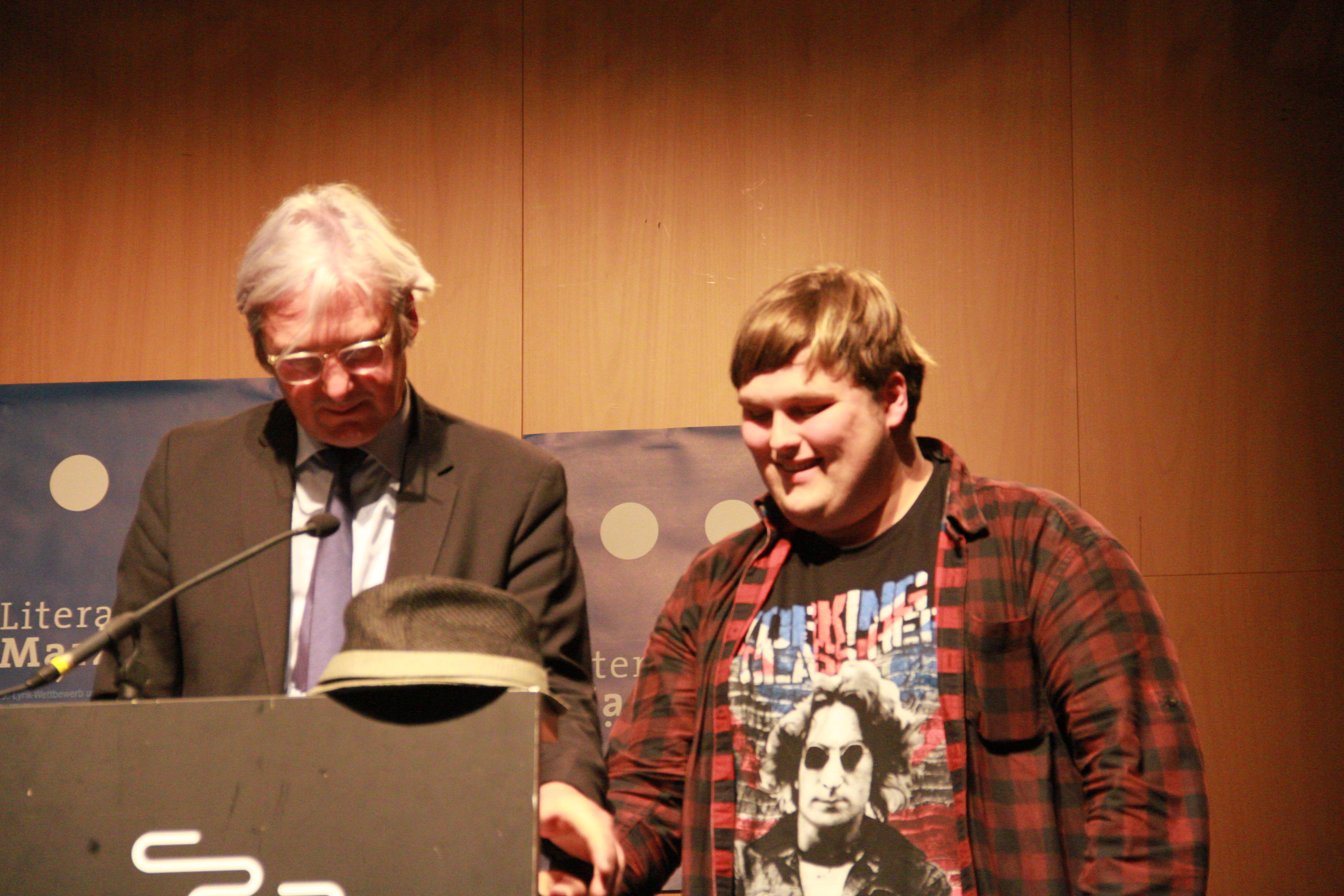
Awarding of the Leonce and Lena Prize to David Krause.

Leonce-und-Lena-Preis is a literary prize of Hesse. The award was founded in 1968; the City of Darmstadt has been awarding the prize since 1979. Leonce and Lena is a play by Georg Büchner. The prize money is €8,000. German-speaking authors who were not older than 35 can take part.

== Winners ==
- 1968 Wolf Wondratschek
- 1969 Katrine von Hutten
- 1972 Hanne F. Juritz
- 1973 Harry Oberländer
- 1975 Rita Breit
- 1977 Friederike Roth and Anno F. Leven
- 1979 Ludwig Fels, Rolf Haufs and Rainer Malkowski
- 1981 Ulla Hahn, Förderpreis Tina Stroheker
- 1983 not awarded
- 1985 Hans-Ulrich Treichel
- 1987 Jan Koneffke, Sonderpreis "Politisches Gedicht": Richard Wagner
- 1989 Kurt Drawert
- 1991 Kerstin Hensel
- 1993 Kathrin Schmidt
- 1995 Raoul Schrott
- 1997 Dieter M. Gräf
- 1999 Raphael Urweider
- 2001 Silke Scheuermann and Sabine Scho
- 2003 Anja Utler
- 2005 Ron Winkler
- 2007 Christian Schloyer
- 2009 Ulrike Almut Sandig
- 2011 Steffen Popp
- 2013 Katharina Schultens
- 2015 David Krause
- 2017 Andra Schwarz
- 2019 Yevgeniy Breyger
- 2021 Katrin Pitz
- 2023 Alexander Schnickmann
- 2025 Sandra Burkhardt
