= Quickborn-Preis =

German literary award

Quickborn-Preis is a literary prize of Germany, which is given for special achievements in the field of Low German language literature or folklore research. First awarded in 1960, it is awarded every two years, and the winner receives a prize of 2000 euros.

== Prize winners ==
=== 1960 – 1984 ===
- 1960: Paul Selk
- 1962: Rudolf Kinau
- 1964: Alma Rogge
- 1966: Albert Mähl
- 1970: Wilhelmine Siefkes
- 1972: Heinrich Schmidt-Barrien
- 1974: Hinrich Kruse
- 1976: Theodor Schuster
- 1978: Günter Harte
- 1980: Heinrich Diers
- 1982: Johann Diedrich Bellmann
- 1984: Konrad Hansen

=== Prize winners since 1992 ===
- 1992: Heinrich Kröger
- 1994: Friedrich W. Michelsen
- 1996: Heinrich Egon Hansen
- 1998: Jürgen Schierer
- 2000: Hans Timmermann
- 2002: Inge Bichel and Ulf Bichel
- 2004: Cornelia Nenz
- 2006: Volker Holm
- 2008: Jürgen Meier
- 2010: Heike Müns
- 2012: Hartmut Cyriacks and Peter Nissen
- 2014: Georg Bühren
- 2016: Dieter Andresen
- 2018: Karl-Heinz Madauß
- 2020: Heinrich Thies
