= Jan Koneffke =

German writer

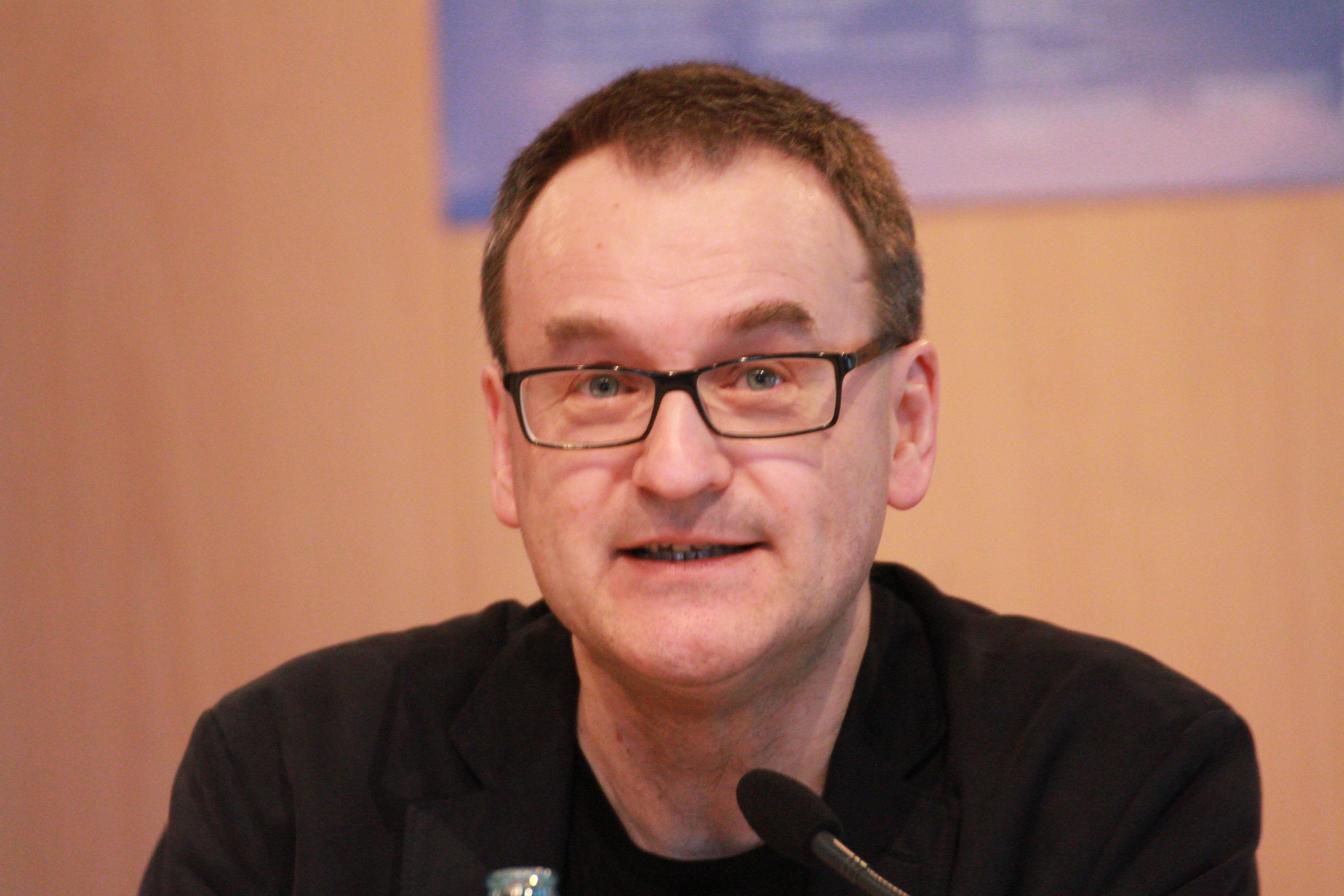
Koffke in 2015 at the Literarischer März

Jan Koneffke (born 19 November 1960) is a German novelist and translator.

== Life ==
Koneffke was born on 19 November 1960 in Darmstadt. He's the son of Gernot Koneffke. He finished his Abitur in 1980 at the Ludwig-Georgs-Gymnasium in Darmstadt. After that he studied philosophy and german philology at the Free University of Berlin, which he finished 1987 with a master's degree. He had a Villa Massimo scholarship after which he lived seven years in Rome. Since 2003 he's been living in Vienna and Bucharest.

== Awards ==
- 1987: Leonce-und-Lena-Preis
- 1990: Sponsorship associated with the Friedrich-Hölderlin-Preis
- 1990: Alfred-Döblin-Stipendium
- 2005: Offenbacher Literaturpreis
- 2013: Usedomer Literaturpreis
- 2016: Uwe Johnson Prize
- 2022: Robert-Gernhardt-Preis

== Works ==
- Vor der Premiere: Erzählung (in German). Frankfurter Verlagsanstalt. 1988. ISBN 978-3-627-10070-4. LCCN 88870004. OCLC 246879677. OL 2155790M.
- Gelbes Dienstrad wie es hoch durch die Luft schoss: Gedichte (in German). Frankfurter Verlagsanstalt. 1989. ISBN 978-3-627-10071-1. LCCN 90139056. OCLC 246625047. OL 21846843M.
- Bergers Fall (in German). Frankfurter Verlagsanstalt. 1991. ISBN 978-3-627-10072-8. LCCN 91166370. OCLC 246556938. OL 1621704M.
- Halt! Paradiesischer Sektor! (in German). Rome: Villa Massimo. 1995. OCLC 246880927.
- Gulliver in Bulgarien (in German). Heidelberg: Das Wunderhorn. 1999. ISBN 978-3-88423-157-9. OCLC 633740443. OL 18379287M.
- Paul Schatz im Uhrenkasten (in German). Köln: DuMont Buchverlag. 2000. ISBN 978-3-7701-5219-3. LCCN 00432728. OCLC 611350956. OL 6879934M.
- Was rauchte ich Schwaden zum Mond (in German). Köln: DuMont Buchverlag. 2001. ISBN 978-3-8321-5218-5. LCCN 2002329996. OCLC 248055331. OL 12871857M.
- Eine Liebe am Tiber (in German). Köln: DuMont Buchverlag. 2004. ISBN 978-3-8321-7863-5. LCCN 2004464917. OCLC 56425817. OL 26765349M.
- Nick mit den stechenden Augen. dtv Reihe Hanser Geisterstunde (in German). München: dtv Verlagsgesellschaft. 2004. ISBN 978-3-423-62157-1. OCLC 237836744.
- Als sei es dein (in German). Heidelberg: Das Wunderhorn. 2018. ISBN 978-3-88423-583-6. LCCN 2018369752. OCLC 1029023577.
- Die Tsantsa-Memoiren (in German). Köln: Galiani Verlag. 2020. ISBN 978-3-86971-177-5. LCCN 2021379525. OCLC 1196906606. OL 44056805M.
- Im Schatten zweier Sommer (in German). Köln: Galiani Verlag. 2024. ISBN 978-3-86971-270-3. OCLC 1404450633.
