= Johannes-Saß-Preis =

German literary award

Johannes-Saß-Preis is a German scientific and literary prize, named after Johannes Sass, a linguist who specialized in the Low German language.

It was first awarded in 1986.
