= Willibald-Pirckheimer-Medaille =

German literary award

Willibald-Pirckheimer-Medaille was a Bavarian literary prize.

== Selected winners ==
- 1955: Friedrich Heer
- 1956: Inge Meidinger-Geise, Franz Schnabel
- 1958: Carl Jacob Burckhardt, Heimito von Doderer, Albrecht Goes
- 1960: Ilse Langner, Sigismund von Radecki, Max Rychner
- 1962: Jeannie Ebner
- 1963: Herbert Meier
- 1964: Max Brod
- 1966: Rolf Bongs
