= Literaturpreis der Wilhelm und Christine Hirschmann-Stiftung =

Literaturpreis der Wilhelm und Christine Hirschmann-Stiftung was a Bavarian literary prize. In 2015, the members of the foundation administration decided not to award any more literary prizes.

== Selected winners ==
- 2009 Ludwig Fels
- 2012 Wolf Wondratschek
- 2014 Thomas Medicus
