= Hessischer Leseförderpreis =

Hessian literary prize

Hessischer Leseförderpreis is a literary prize of Hesse.
