= Holzhäuser Heckethaler =

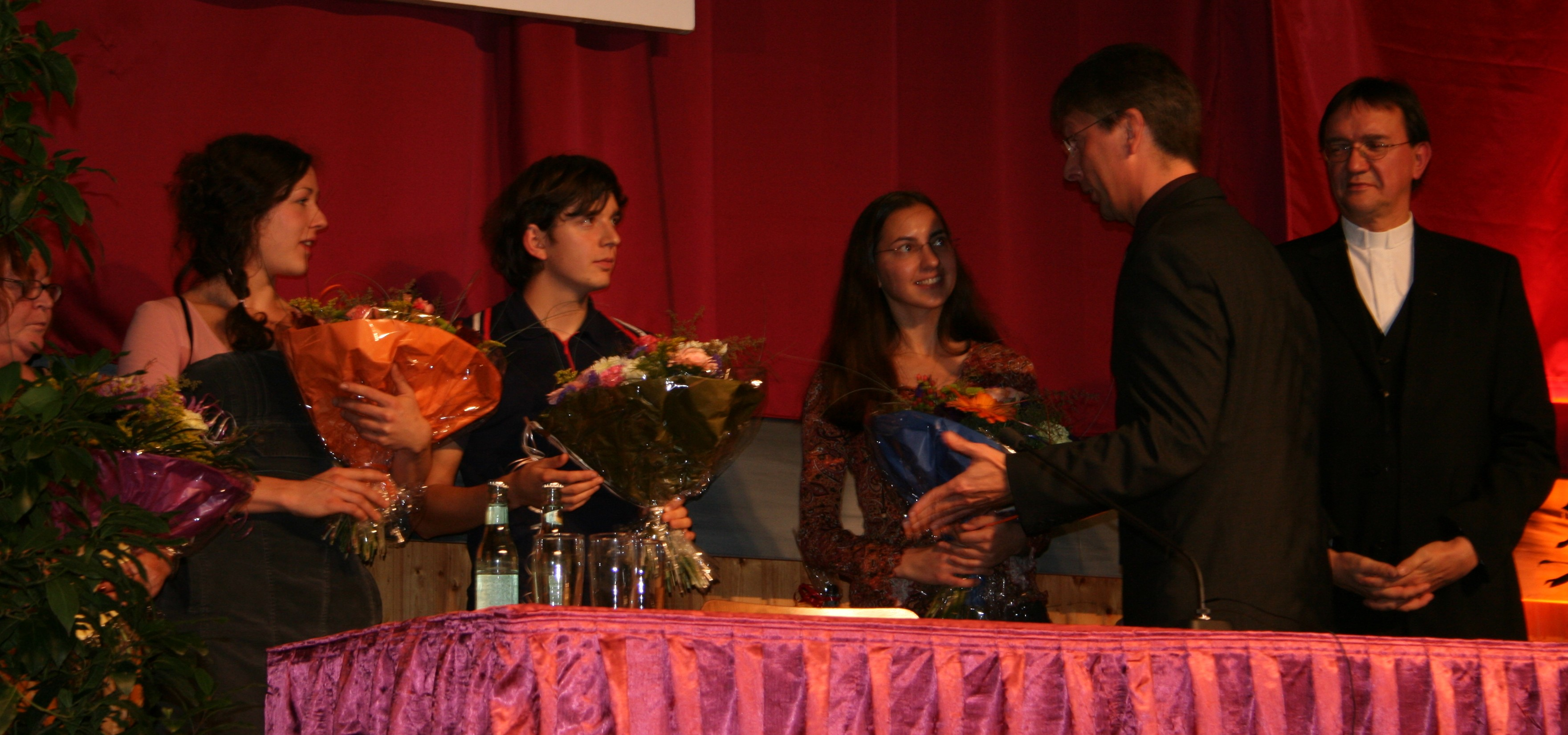
Holzhäuser Heckethaler, 2006

Holzhäuser Heckethaler is a literary prize of Hesse.
