= Kuriosester Buchtitel des Jahres =

Kuriosester Buchtitel des Jahres is a literary prize of Germany. It awards strange titles, not quality of books.

== Winners ==
- 2010 The Hitman's Guide to Housecleaning by Hallgrímur Helgason, the German title is Zehn Tipps, das Morden zu beenden und mit dem Abwasch zu beginnen.
