= Penzberger Urmel =

Penzberger Urmel is a Bavarian literary prize.

== Winners ==
- 2005 Kurt Bracharz: Wie der Maulwurf beinahe in der Lotterie gewann
- 2007 Dagmar Geisler : Wanda und die Mädchenhasserbande
- 2009 Brian Selznick : Die Entdeckung des Hugo Cabret (The Invention of Hugo Cabret)
- 2011 Anke Dörrzapf (author) and Claudia Lieb (illustrator): Die wunderbaren Reisen des Marco Polo
- 2013 Hanna Schott (author) und Gerda Raidt (illustrator): Fritzi war dabei – Eine Wendegeschichte
- 2015 Paul Biegel (author) und Linde Faas (illustrator): Die Prinzessin mit den roten Haaren
- 2017 Kai Pannen (author and illustrator): Du spinnst wohl. Eine außergewöhnliche Adventsgeschichte in 24 Kapiteln
- 2019 Antonia Michaelis (author) und Claudia Carls (illustrator): Das Blaubeerhaus
