= Ingeborg-Drewitz-Literaturpreis für Gefangene =

Ingeborg-Drewitz-Literaturpreis für Gefangene is a literary prize of Germany.
