= Friedlandpreis der Heimkehrer =

German literary award

Friedlandpreis der Heimkehrer ("Friedland Prize of the Returnees") is an artistic and literary prize of Germany donated by the Association of Returnees, Prisoners of War and Missing Relatives of Germany. It has been awarded annually since 1960. The original prize was 3,000 Deutsche Marks.

== Notable recipients ==
- 1960: Wolfgang Schwarz – novel, Die unsichtbare Brücke
- 1961: Fritz Theilmann – sculpture, Denen, die wehrlos sterben ("Those Who Die Defenseless").
- 1963: Hans Melchior Brugk – composition, Deutsches Te Deum.
- 1965: Hansjörg Kühn "Masken und Menschen"
