= DeLiA =

Association of romance writers

DeLiA is an association founded in 2003, promoting the literary genre of romance. DeLiA was founded by twelve female authors to promote German-language romance literature. Currently, the association has over 200 members. Well-known members of DeLiA include Eva Völler, Rebecca Michéle (both of them are founding members), Petra Hülsmann, Deana Zinßmeister, Nina George, and couple Iny Lorentz.

== History ==
DeLiA was founded on 3 May 2003 as part of the Booklover Conference in Bad Homburg. Today, the association is based in Meerbusch.

Ever since it was formed, DeLiA has recorded a steady increase in membership, and it currently lists over 200 members. Every member brings the amount of books to 33 million. About ten percent of the members are men who usually write under a female pseudonym.

== DeLiA Literature Award ==
The DeLiA Literature Award has been given out since 2004, with 1500 euros of prize money for the best German-language romance novel. Ever since 2017, the best German-language romance novel for young people has been awarded.

This is a list of winners of the award:

- 2004: Tagdiebe by Kathrin Tsainis; ISBN 3-40150-910-1
- 2005: Ein unmoralisches Sonderangebot by Kerstin Gier; ISBN 3-40416-957-3, shared with Sommersturm by Olaf Büttner; ISBN 3-79417-022-9
- 2006: Robert Zimmermann wundert sich über die Liebe by Gernot Gricksch; ISBN 3-42651-976-3
- 2007: Libellensommer by Antje Babendererde; ISBN 3-40150-910-1
- 2008: Perfektion by Michaela Rabe; ISBN 3-80259-385-5
- 2009: Der Traum vom Tod by Britt Reissmann; ISBN 3-89705-563-5
- 2010: Die Lichtermagd by Lena Falkenhagen; ISBN 3-45340-568-4
- 2011: Die Mondspielerin by Nina George; ISBN 3-42650-135-X
- 2012: Die Sprache der Schatten by Susanne Goga; ISBN 3-45335-468-0
- 2013: Dark Canopy by Jennifer Benkau; ISBN 3-55131-455-1
- 2014: Der Geschmack von Sommerregen by Julie Leuze; ISBN 3-86396-062-9
- 2015: Das Geheime Versprechen by Annette Dutton; ISBN 3-42651-373-0
- 2016: Liebe auf drei Pfoten by Fiona Blum; ISBN 3-44248-518-5
- 2017: Die Schwestern vom Eisfluss by Rebecca Maly; ISBN 978-3-499-27254-7
- 2018: Antonias Tochter by Nora Elias; ISBN 978-3-442-48554-3
- 2019: Wie Treibholz im Sturm by Daniela Ohms; ISBN 978-3-426-65431-6
- 2020: Mehr als die Erinnerung by Melanie Metzenthin; ISBN 978-2-919804-31-3
- 2021: Ein Gefühl von Hoffnung by Eva Völler; ISBN 978-3-7857-2694-5

This is a list of winners of the DeLiA Youth Literature Award:

- 2018: Wovon du träumst bu Kira Gembri; ISBN 978-3-401-51143-6
- 2019: Meine Checkliste zum Verlieben by Anja Janotta; ISBN 978-3-7348-5033-2
- 2020: Orcasommer by Sabine Giebken; ISBN 978-3-7348-8208-1
- 2021: Immer ist ein verdammt langes Wort by Sabine Schoder; ISBN 978-3-7373-5743-2
