= Ann Cotten =

American-born Austrian writer

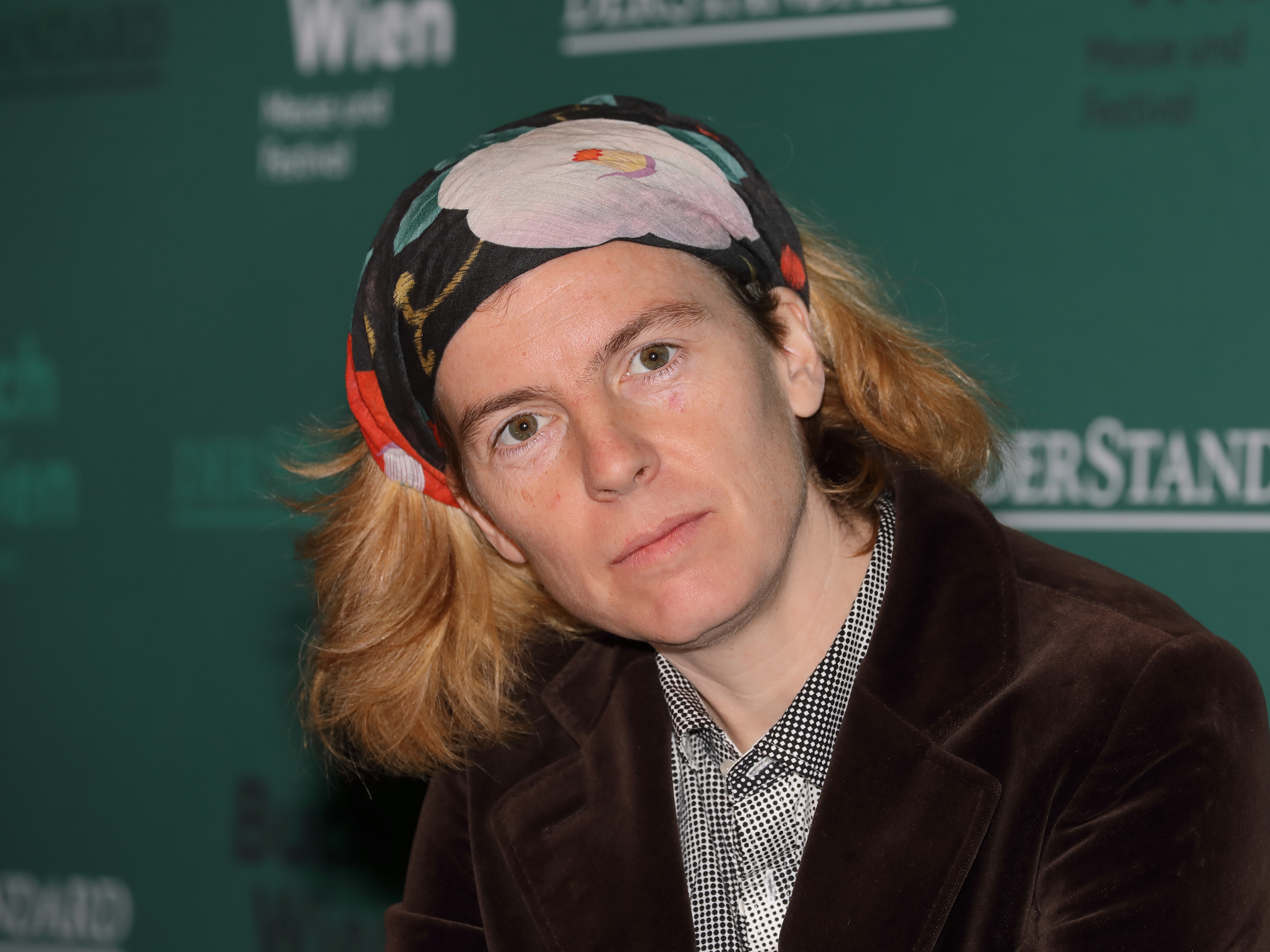
Ann Cotten at the Vienna Book Fair 2024

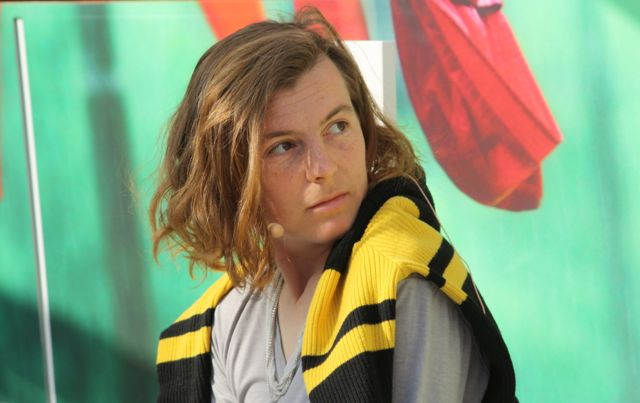
Ann Cotten at the Leipzig Book Fair 2014

Ann Cotten (born 1982 in Ames, Iowa) is an American-born Austrian writer. She generally writes (and speaks) in Standard Austrian German and introduces linguistic innovations.

== Life and work ==
At the age of five, Cotten moved to Vienna with her parents, who are both biochemists who worked in Vienna. She finished university there in 2006 with a work about concrete poetry. At the same time she first emerged as a poet at poetry slams. In 2007 Cotten, whose work has been published in anthologies and poetry journals, found considerable success as a writer with her first book, Fremdwörterbuchsonnette, which was published at Suhrkamp. Other books with Suhrkamp are Florida-Räume in 2001, Der schaudernde Fächer in 2013, Verbannt! Versepos in 2016.

Some of Cotten's poems have been translated into English and published in journals like burning deck (USA). In 2010 she collaborated with visual artist Kerstin Cmelka in a book called I, Coleoptile containing original English poetry and film stills, published by Broken Dimanche Press. The book Lather in Heaven, published by the same editor in 2016, assembles her work in English up to date, as well as some selected translations from the German.

In 2016, Jikiketsugaki. Tsurezuregusa, was published by the Peter Engstler Verlag. It contains a selection of Cotten's poems and prose, inspired by Japan, Japanese literature, and the semiotics of the Japanese language. Fast Dumm, Essays von on the road is a reflecting book about visiting the United States, including poems, essays, photographies and her own translations of poems of other poets, like Sergei Yesenin, Vladimir Mayakovsky, W.H. Auden, Langston Hughes, Katia Sophia Ditzler. The book was published by Starfruit Publications in 2017.

Since 2020, Cotten has started work on a PhD project at Peter Szondi Institut für Allgemeine und Vergleichende Literaturwissenschaft at Freie Universität Berlin, with the current working title "Misuseability. Aesthetic Recycling and Deviance as a Feedback Monitoring System (or How To Like Poems and Essays)".

Since 2023, Cotten has taken on co-editorship (with Sandro Huber and Gerd Sulzenbacher) of the bi-yearly journal "Triëdere" for theory and literature.

Cotten lives in Vienna and in Berlin. She relinquished US citizenship in 2005.

== Non-gendered language use ==
Ann Cotten sometimes uses an innovative form of non-discriminatory language use in Austrian German. She employs what she calls "Polnisches Gendering" with the letters for all gender forms in randomized order selected for ease of pronunciation. Besides ensuring a politically incorrect atmosphere, Cotten's "Polish Gendering", also roughly references Polish Notation. This yields for "Lehrer" 'male teacher' and "Lehrerin" 'female teacher' the gender-neutral "Lehrerni". It is only in the plural form "Lehrernnnie" that there can be found a superficial reminiscence of Polish "Kochanie". Cotten uses these novel forms effortlessly in speech and in writing, avoiding the verbal glottal stop in both "Genderstern", e.g. "Lehrer*in", and the now (2024) more dominant non-gender form of the colon, e.g. "Lehrer:in". Cotten maintains a pluralist and fluid stance in questions of gender and language and also often uses "Entgendern nach Phettberg", when appropriate, which neuters everybody ("Das Lehry", "das Auty").

== Publications ==
- Fremdwörterbuchsonette, poetry, Suhrkamp, Frankfurt/Main 2007, ISBN 978-3-518-12497-0.
- Nach der Welt. Die Listen der konkreten Poesie und ihre Folgen., essay, Klever, Vienna 2008, ISBN 978-3-902665-01-0.
- Glossarattrappen, prose, AusnahmeVerlag, Hamburg 2008, ISBN 978-3-940992-09-3.
- Das Pferd. SuKuLTuR, Berlin 2009 (Schöner Lesen Nr. 84), ISBN 978-3-941592-03-2.
- Florida-Räume, poetry, Suhrkamp, Frankfurt/Main 2010, ISBN 978-3-518-42132-1.
- Helm aus Phlox. Zur Theorie des schlechtesten Werkzeugs. Merve Verlag, Berlin 2011, ISBN 978-3-88396-292-4.
- Pflock in der Landschaft, Schock Edition (1), EdK/Distillery, Berlin 2011, ISBN 978-3-941330-28-3.
- I, Coleoptile, poetry (English), Broken Dimanche Press, Berlin-Oslo-Dublin 2010, ISBN 978-3-00-032627-1.
- Jikiketsugaki. Tsurezuregusa. Verlag Peter Engstler, Ostheim/Rhön 2016, ISBN 978-3-941126-91-6.
- Lather in Heaven! (English), Broken Dimanche Press, Berlin-Oslo-Dublin 2016, ISBN 978-3-943196-40-5.
- Fast Dumm, Essays von on the road, Starfruit Publications, Fürth 2017, ISBN 978-3-922895-32-9.
- Lyophilia, Erzählungen, Suhrkamp Verlag, Berlin 2019, ISBN 978-3-518-42869-6.
- Die Anleitungen der Vorfahren, Edition Suhrkamp, 2023, ISBN 978-3-518-02981-7.
- Poller. Idyllen. Suhrkamp Verlag, Berlin 2026, ISBN 978-3-518-00133-2.

== Honors ==
- 2007: Reinhard-Priessnitz-Preis
- 2008: George-Saiko-Reisestipendium
- 2008: Clemens-Brentano-Preis
- 2012: Newcomer award of the Hermann-Hesse-Preis
- 2014: Adelbert-von-Chamisso-Preis
- 2014: Wilhelm-Lehmann-Preis
- 2015: Newcomer award of the Ernst-Bloch-Preis
- 2015: Klopstock-Preis
- 2017: Hugo-Ball-Preis
- 2017: Elected into the Academy of Arts, Berlin
- 2018: Stipend for the Villa Aurora
- 2021: Gert-Jonke-Preis
- 2024: Christine Lavant Preis
- 2026: Heimrad-Bäcker-Preis
