= Wolf Wondratschek =

German author (born 1943)

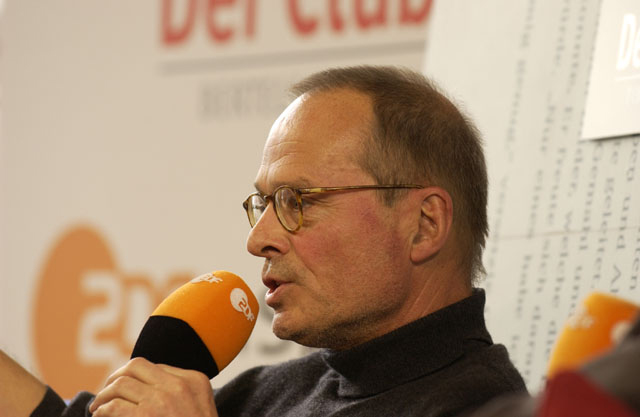
Wolf Wondratschek, 2003

Wolf Wondratschek (German pronunciation: [ˈvɔlf ˈvɔndʁat͡ʃɛk]; born August 14, 1943) is a German author. He was born in Rudolstadt in Thuringia.

== Life ==
Wondratschek grew up in Karlsruhe. From 1962 through 1967, he studied literature, philosophy and sociology at the Ruprecht Karl University of Heidelberg, Georg-August University of Göttingen, and the Johann Wolfgang Goethe University of Frankfurt am Main. In 1968, Wolf won the prestigious Leonce and Lena Prize for poetry given by the city of Darmstadt. The next year, Wolf's first book, Früher begann der Tag mit einer Schußwunde, came out to critical acclaim; the short stories which included his famous piece, Mittagspause. During 1970 and 1971, Wolf was a Research Fellow at the University of Warwick. In 1970, he won the Hörspielpreis der Kriegsblinden for his radio play Paul oder die Zerstörung (Paul or the Destruction). He continued to publish both poetry and prose during the 1980s, when he took an extended vacation to the United States, and Mexico. Upon his return to Germany, Wondratschek settled into residences in Munich and Vienna, publishing not only poetry and prose, but also radio plays and screenplays. In 2012, Wolf was awarded the Literaturpreis der Wilhelm und Christine Hirschmann-Stiftung, a Bavarian literary prize.

== Work ==
Wondratschek was influenced mainly by writers from Gruppe 47, such as Ingeborg Bachmann and Paul Celan. His work is characterized by its sparseness and usage of "colloquial language; his sentences are short and clear, grammatically reduced to a minimum."

== Selected filmography ==
- Violanta (1976)
