= Elisabeth-Engelhardt-Literaturpreis =

German literary award

Elisabeth-Engelhardt-Literaturpreis is a literary prize in Germany, awarded every three years by the Landrat of Roth district Herbert Eckstein.

== Laureates ==
- 1997 Ingeborg Höverkamp
- 2000 Klaus Schamberger
- 2003 Gerd Berghofer
- 2006 Elfriede Bidmon
- 2009 Willi Weglehner
- 2012 Katharina Storck-Duvenbeck
- 2015 Klaus "Billy" Wechsler
- 2018 Monika Martin
- 2021 Anja Lehmann
- 2024 Andreas Friedrich
