= KölnLiteraturPreis =

German literary award

KölnLiteraturPreis is a literary prize of Cologne, Germany for works in standard German or Colognian. The award is suspended or has been discontinued

== Recipients ==
- 1990 Tilman Röhrig
- 1991 Albert Vogt (alias B. Gravelott)
- 1992 Peter Fuchs
- 1993 Helma Cardauns and Helene Rahms
- 1996 Martin Stankowski
- 1997 Peter Squentz (alias Michael Bengel)
- 1998 Hans Knipp
- 1999 Gaby Amm
- 2000 Reinold Louis
- 2001 Willy Leson
- 2002 Frank Schätzing
- 2005 Carl Dietmar
- 2006 Konrad Beikircher
