= MIMI (literary award) =

MIMI is a literary prize of Germany. Mimi is a female given name popular after 1962 film Ohne Krimi geht die Mimi nie ins Bett (Mimi goes never to bed without a crime book).

| Year | Winner | Novel |
|---|---|---|
| 1990 | Elizabeth George | Auf Ehre und Gewissen Well-Schooled in Murder |
| 2008 | Volker Klüpfel; Michael Kobr | Seegrund |
| 2009 | Volker Klüpfel; Michael Kobr | Laienspiel |
| 2010 | Stephan Brüggenthies | Der geheimnislose Junge |
| 2011 | Sobo Swobodnik | Kuhdoo |
| 2012 | Jörg Maurer | Niedertracht |
| 2013 | Jörg Maurer | Oberwasser |
| 2014 | Nele Neuhaus | Böser Wolf |
| 2015 | Jussi Adler-Olsen | Erwartung The Marco Effect |
| 2016 | Stefan Ahnhem | Der Herzsammler |
| 2017 | Klaus-Peter Wolf | Ostfriesenschwur |
| 2018 | Sebastian Fitzek | AchtNacht EightNight |
| 2019 | Sebastian Fitzek | Flugangst 7A Seat 7a |
| 2020 | Alex Beer, real name Daniela Larcher | Der dunkle Bote |
