= Janusz-Korczak-Preis =

Janusz-Korczak-Preis is a literary prize of Hesse named after Janusz Korczak.

== Winners ==
- 1978 Andreas Mehringer
- 1979 Boguslaw Halikowski, Szczecin
- 1980 Shimon Sachs, Tel-Aviv
- 1983 Bella Abramowna Dizur, Riga
- 1985 Mirjam Akavia, Tel-Aviv
- 1986 Igor Newerly, Warschau
- 1987 Jüdische Gemeinde Gießen
- 1988 Józef Bogusz, Krakau
- 1988 Leon Harari, Kibbuz Maale Hachamisha
- 1988 Rafael Scharf, London
- 1990 Szmuel Gogol, Ramat Gan
- 1993 Arkadiusz Nowak, Piastów
- 2008 Itzchak Belfer, Tel-Aviv
- 2011 Friedhelm Beiner, Mainz
- 2013 Freezone – Mannheim (Ute Schnebel, Andrea Schulz, Markus Unterländer)
- 2014 Experimentelles Theater Günzburg (Siegfried Steiger)
- 2017 Janusz Korczak-Schule, Welzheim
- 2019 Iwona Roszkowski, Roman Schaffner
- 2022 Marta Ciesielska, Korczakianum in Warschau
