= Feuergriffel =

Feuergriffel is a literary prize awarded in Baden-Württemberg, Germany. It is a Stadtschreiber Scholarship for Children's and Youth Literature presented by the City Library Mannheim.

== Winners ==
- 2007: Tamara Bach
- 2009: Antje Wagner
- 2011: Rike Reiniger
- 2013: Saša Stanišić
- 2015: Tobias Steinfeld
- 2017: Florian Wacker
- 2019: Tania Witte
- 2021: Julia Willmann
