= Frauenkrimipreis der Stadt Wiesbaden =

Literary prize for female writers

Frauenkrimipreis der Stadt Wiesbaden was a literary prize of Hesse awarded to female writers until 2006.

== Winners ==
- 2000 Petra Hammesfahr for Die Mutter
- 2001 Susanne Mischke for Wer nicht hören will, muß fühlen
- 2002 Martina Borger and Maria Elisabeth Straub for Kleine Schwester
- 2002 Irmtraut Karlsson for Mord am Ring
- 2003 Ramona Diefenbach for Schneckenspur
- 2004 Verena Wyss for Die Gärtnerin
- 2005 Sabine Deitmer for Scharfe Stiche
