= Karl-Preusker-Medaille =

German literary award

The Karl-Preusker-Medaille (Karl Preusker Medal) is awarded annually by the German Bibliothek & Information Deutschland (German Association of Library & Information) on the Day of Libraries in memory of Karl Benjamin Preusker (1786–1871) to people and institutions that effectively promote the cultural mission of the library system.

The award was established in 1996 by the Deutschen Literaturkonferenz (German Literature Conference) and awarded by it until 2009. It "is considered to be one of the highest honours in the German library system".

== Recipients ==
- 1996 Peter Härtling
- 1997 Annette Kasper
- 1998 Christa Spangenberg
- 1999 Jürgen Heckel
- 2000 Roswitha Kuhnert
- 2001 Bettina Windau
- 2002 Erich Loest
- 2003 Regina Peeters
- 2004 Angelika Casper, Spokeswoman for the initiative to save Cologne's school libraries
- 2005 Birgit Dankert
- 2006 Paul Raabe
- 2007 Georg P. Salzmann, book collector
- 2008 Martin Weskott
- 2009 Marion Schulz, librarian in Bremen For her services in setting up a database on women writers in Germany after 1945 and for researching the literature of these women authors
- 2010 no award
- 2011 Horst Köhler, Federal President
- 2012 Ranga Yogeshwar
- 2013 Bernhard Fabian
- 2014 Thomas Feibel
- 2015 Konrad Umlauf
- 2016 Thomas Beyer
- 2017 Claudia Fabian
- 2018 Allianz der Wissenschaftsorganisationen
- 2019 Hannelore Vogt
- 2020 Wikimedia Deutschland
- 2021 Aat Vos
