= Heinrich-Wolgast-Preis =

German literary prize

The Heinrich-Wolgast-Preis is a German literary prize awarded by the GEW union. Founded in 1986, the award aims to increase the visibility of workers in children's and young adult literature by promoting outstanding works that explore the realities of labor and social conditions.

== Recipients ==
- 1986: Klas Ewert Everwyn, Achtung Baustelle!
- 1988: Sven Wernström, Knechte. Malin von Hejpytten
- 1990: Monika Pelz, Reif für die Insel
- 1993: Andreas Lettau, Glücksrausch
- 1996: Susanne Sterzenbach, Alles im Kasten
- 1999: Gudrun Pausewang, Hörst du den Fluß, Elin?
- 2002: Virginia Euwer Wolff, Wenn dir das Leben eine Zitrone gibt, mach Limonade draus
- 2005: Thomas Ahrens, Der Ball ist rund – ein Globalisierungskrimi (Theaterstück)
- 2008: Gabriele Beyerlein, In Berlin vielleicht
- 2011: TRICKBOXX des Kinderkanals KI.KA
- 2013: Sharon Rentta, Doktor Tobis Tierklinik – Ein Tag im Krankenhaus
- 2015: Ronan de Calan, Donatien Mary, Das Gespenst des Karl Marx
- 2017: Martin Petersen, Exit Sugartown
- 2019: Wolfgang Korn, Lauf um dein Leben
- 2021: Christoph Scheuring, Sturm
- 2023: Eva Müller, Scheiblettenkind

== Source ==
- Heinrich-Wolgast-Preis der GEW
