= Merck Kakehashi Literature Prize =

Merck Kakehashi Literature Prize (German: Merck „Kakehashi“ Literaturpreises) is a biannual literary translation prize awarded by the Goethe-Institut Tokyo and Merck KGaA, a German chemical and pharmaceutical company. It is for works by German authors made accessible for a Japanese readership. The prize is €10,000 each going to the author and the translator.

== Winners ==
- 2014 Wada Jun for ポカホンタスのいる湖の風景, a translation of Arno Schmidt's Seelandschaft mit Pocahontas
