= Daniel Zahno =

Swiss writer (born 1963)

Daniel Zahno (born in Basel, 8 November 1963) is a Swiss writer.

He studied English and Germanic Philology at the University of Basel.

He is a member of Authors of Switzerland and has received literature prizes like Würth-Literaturpreis in 1996.

== Works ==
- Doktor Turban, 1996
- Im Hundumdrehen, 2006
- Die Geliebte des Gelatiere, 2009
- Rot wie die Nacht, 2010
- Alle lieben Alexia, 2011
- Manhattan Rose, 2013
- Wanderverführer, 2015
