= Margarete-Schrader-Preis =

German literary prize

Coordinates: 51°42′17″N 8°46′26″E

Margarete-Schrader-Preis is a German literary prize. It is awarded by University of Paderborn to authors who have lived or promoted literature in Westphalia. The prize is named after Margarete Schrader (1914–2001) who left money for the award in her will. It is the only literary prize in Germany to be awarded by a university. Award winners receive €8,000.

== Previous winners ==
- 2016: Jörg Albrecht
- 2012: Martin Heckmanns
- 2009: Kevin Vennemann
- 2006: Judith Kuckart
- 2003: Hans-Ulrich Treichel
