= Peter-Härtling-Preis =

German literature prize

Peter-Härtling-Preis is a literature prize awarded in Baden-Württemberg, Germany. It grants the finest unpublished prose manuscript for children and young people (ages 8 to 15) every two years.

== Winners ==
- 1984 Karin Gündisch: Geschichten über Astrid
- 1986 Cordula Tollmien: La gatta heißt Katze; Reinhold Ziegler: Groß am Himmel
- 1988 Margaret Klare: Heute Nacht ist viel passiert
- 1990 Reinhard Burger: Der Wind und die Sterne
- 1992 Josef Holub: Der rote Nepomuk
- 1994 Ingrid Möller: Ein Schmetterling aus Surinam
- 1996 Nina Petrick: Die Regentrinkerin
- 1998 Irma Krauß: Arabella
- 2000 Regine Beckmann: Angel Mike
- 2002 Martina Wildner: Jede Menge Sternschnuppen
- 2005 Katrin Bongard: Radio Gaga
- 2007 Christiane Thiel: Das Jahr, in dem ich 13 1/2 war
- 2009 Gabi Kreslehner: Charlottes Traum
- 2011 Salah Naoura: Matti und Sami
- 2013 Nataly Savina: Love Alice
- 2015 Regina Dürig: Eigentlich lieber nicht
- 2017 Andrea Badey and Claudia Kühn: Strom auf der Tapete
- 2019 Antje Herden: Keine halben Sachen mehr
- 2021 Juliane Pickel: Krummer Hund
