= Mannheimer Heinrich-Vetter-Literaturpreis =

German literary award

Mannheimer Heinrich-Vetter-Literaturpreis is a literary prize of the Rhine-Neckar Metropolitan Region in Germany.
