= Bertelsmann-Preisausschreiben =

German literary award

Bertelsmann-Preisausschreiben was an irregularly given literary award in Germany, awarded by the C. Bertelsmann Verlag. It awarded prizes for several literary genres.
