= Peter Härtling =

German writer, poet, publisher and journalist

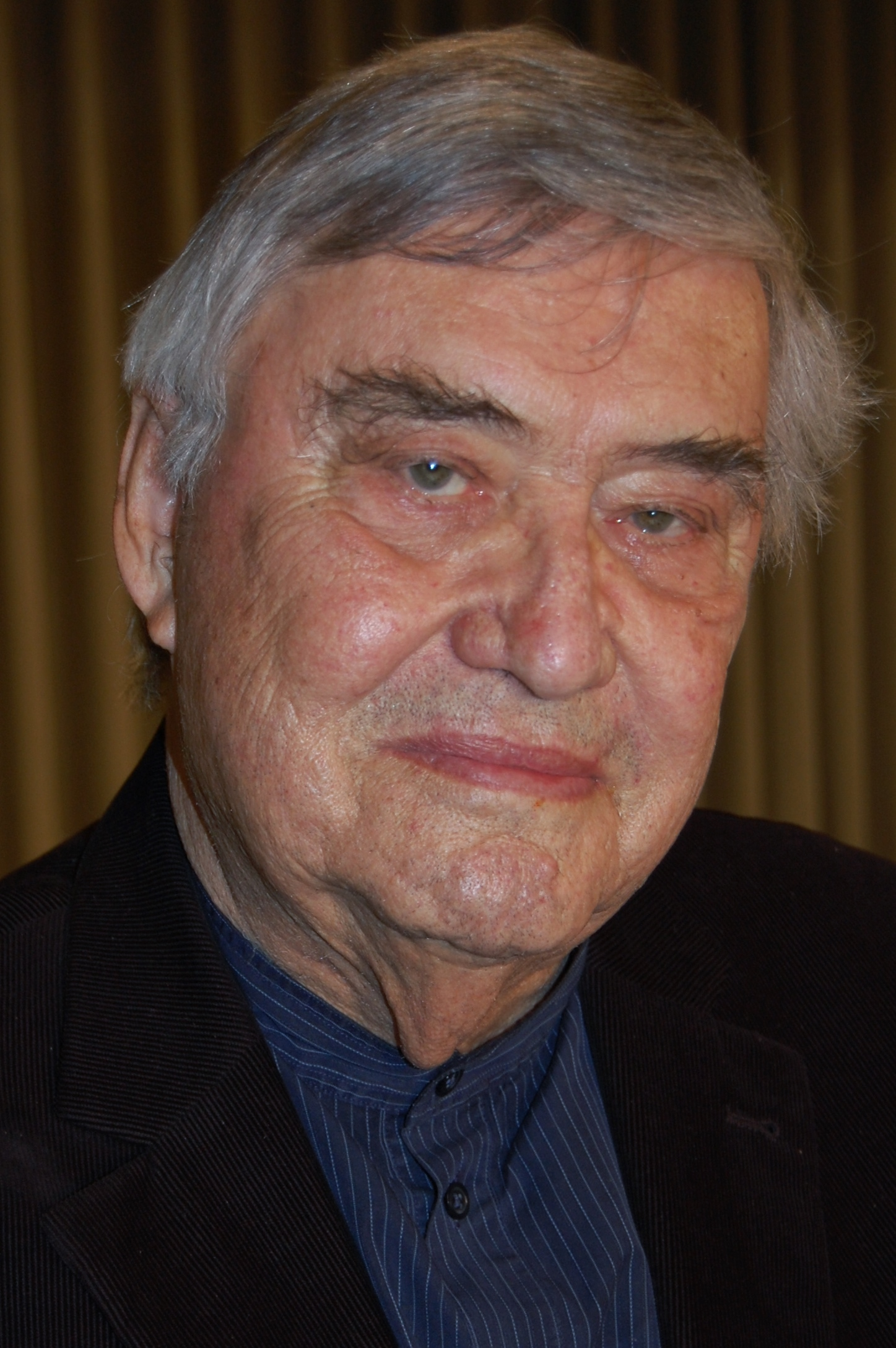
- Härtling in 2013
- Born: 13 November 1933; Chemnitz, Germany
- Died: 10 July 2017 (aged 83); Rüsselsheim am Main, Germany
- Occupations: Writer, poet

Peter Härtling (German: [ˈpeːtɐ ˈhɛʁtlɪŋ]; 13 November 1933 – 10 July 2017) was a German writer, poet, publisher and journalist. He received the Order of Merit of the Federal Republic of Germany for his major contribution to German literature.

== Biography ==
Härtling was born in Chemnitz and spent the early part of his childhood living in Hartmannsdorf, Mittweida, where his father maintained a law firm. Following the outbreak of World War II, the family moved to the German-occupied town of Olomouc in Moravia. Like many of the town's German residents, Härtling's family fled before the Red Army's advance on the city during the final months of the war; the family briefly settled in Zwettl, Austria. Härtling's father was captured by the Russians, and died in June 1945 at the prisoner-of-war camp in Dollersheim. Following the conclusion of World War II, Härtling finally settled in Nürtingen, Baden-Württemberg. His mother committed suicide in October 1946. He studied under HAP Grieshaber at the Bernsteinschule art school, before starting work as a journalist.

Härtling had his first collection of poetry published in 1953. From 1967 to 1973, Härtling was the managing director of the German publishing house S. Fischer Verlag, located in Frankfurt. Härtling became a full-time writer after leaving S. Fischer Verlag. In the winter semester of 1983/84, he hosted the annual Frankfurter Poetik-Vorlesungen, a lecture series, in which a prominent writer discourses on topics pertaining to their work. Härtling used his lectureship to demonstrate the process of using a found object as the inspiration for a literary work. During the series of lectures, he wrote Der spanische Soldat, a short story based on a photograph by Robert Capa.

Härtling worked as the editor of the magazine Der Monat, and as the president of the Hölderlin society. In 1973, he moved to Mörfelden-Walldorf where he lived until his death on 10 July 2017.

== Literary themes ==
Härtling devoted a large proportion of his literary output – both in poetry, and in prose – to the reclamation of history, and his own past. His autobiographical novel, Zwettl (1973), deals with the period he spent living in Lower Austria, after his family fled from the Red Army. Nachgetragene Liebe (1980) recounts Härtling's earliest memories of his deceased father.

Another major influence on Härtling's works has been the literature and music of Romanticism. Amongst other works, Härtling has written fictionalised biographical works on the writers Friedrich Hölderlin, Wilhelm Waiblinger and E. T. A. Hoffmann, and the composers Franz Schubert, and Robert Schumann.

== Children's literature ==
In 1969, after writing a eulogy for the Czech children's writer Jan Procházka, Härtling began writing books for children. His first children's book, Und das ist die ganze Familie, was published the following year. His children's literature has often focused on social problems involving children. In Das war der Hirbel (1973), he wrote about the home of a maladjusted child, and Oma (1975) talks about aging and death, whilst Theo haut ab (1977) deals with being uprooted from home and family. There are English translations of several of his children's books, including Granny (Oma), Crutches (Krücke), Ben Loves Anna (Ben liebt Anna), Old John (Alter John), and Herbie's World (Das war der Hirbel).

== Radio ==
Härtling moderated Literatur im Kreuzverhör, a radio show on the cultural radio station of Hessischer Rundfunk.

== Awards ==
Peter Härtling's awards include:

- 1964: Deutscher Kritikerpreis for Niembsch
- 1965: Lower Saxony Literature Prize for Niembsch
- 1966: Ehrengabe des Kulturkreises im Bundesverband der Deutschen Industrie for Niembsch. Prix du Meilleur Livre Étranger for the French edition of Niembsch
- 1971: Gerhart Hauptmann prize of the Freien Volksbühne Berlin for Gilles
- 1974: Schubart-Literaturpreis
- 1976: Deutscher Jugendliteraturpreis (Children's book) for Oma.
- 1977: Stadtschreiber von Bergen
- 1978: Wilhelmine-Lübke-Preis
- 1980: Zurich children's literature prize La vache qui lit for Ben liebt Anna and Sofie macht Geschichten.
- 1982: Naturschutzpreis der Kreisgruppe Groß-Gerau des Bundes für Umwelt und Naturschutz.
- 1987: Hermann Sinsheimer prize and Friedrich Hölderlin prize
- 1992: Lion Feuchtwanger prize.
- 1994: Awarded the title of Professor by the state of Baden-Württemberg
- 1995: Awarded the Großes Bundesverdienstkreuz
- 1995: Mainzer Stadtschreiber
- 1996: Awarded the Wilhelm Leuschner medal of Hessen
- 1996: Awarded the Karl Preusker Medal by the German Literature Conference
- 2000: Eichendorff Literature Prize
- 2001: Deutscher Jugendliteraturpreis (Special prize) for his major contribution to children's literature
- 2001: Dresdner Poetikdozentur zur Literatur Mitteleuropas (Publikation )
- 2003: Deutscher Bücherpreis for his contribution to literature
- 2004: Honorary citizen of Nürtingen
- 2006: Gerty Spies Literature Prize
- 2006: Finalist, Hans Christian Andersen Award
- 2007: Corine Literature Prize of the Bavarian Prime Minister for his contribution to literature
- 2010: Jacob Grimm Prize
- 2014: Hessischer Kulturpreis

== Music ==
Wilhelm Killmayer set nine of his poems in his song cycle Nine Songs to Poems from Peter Härtling in 1968.
