= Victor Otto Stomps-Preis =

German literary award

Victor Otto Stomps-Preis is a literary prize of Germany. Victor Otto Stomps, VauO, was a German publisher and writer.
