= Deutscher Erzählerpreis (2008) =

German literary prize

Deutscher Erzählerpreis (2008) is a literary prize of Germany.
