= Friedrich-Rückert-Preis =

German literary award

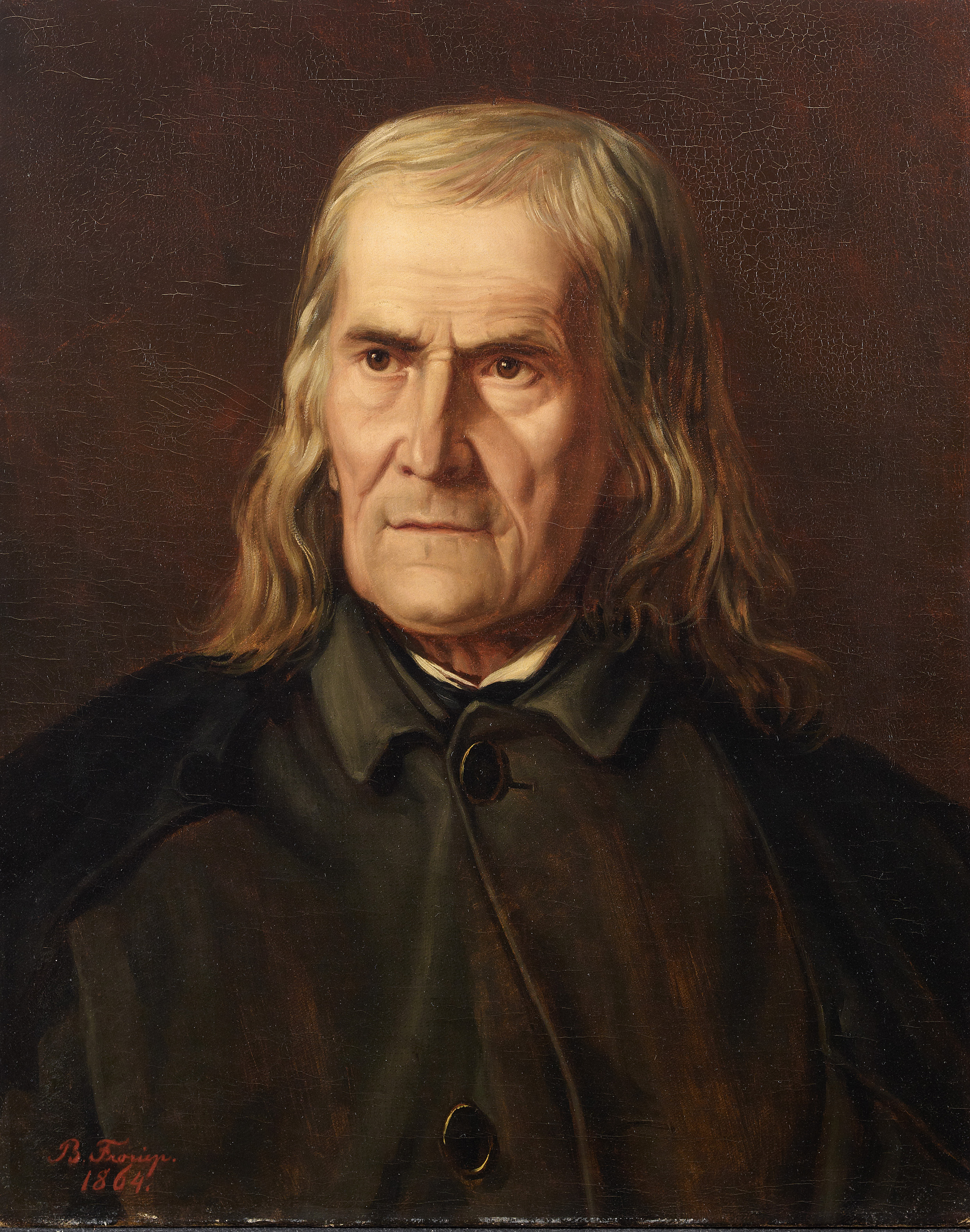
Freidrich Rückert (1864)

Friedrich-Rückert-Preis is a literary prize of the city of Schweinfurt, Bavaria, Germany.
