= Eichendorff-Literaturpreis =

German literary award

- Type: Literary award
- Location: Wangen im Allgäu
- Country: Germany
- Formerly called: Taugenichts-Reise-Stipendium
- Reward: €5,000
- First award: 1956
- Final award: 2025
- Currently held by: Michael Donhauser

Highlights
- Total: 69
- Total awarded posthumously: 1
- Total recipients: 72
- Website: http://www.wangener-kreis.de

Eichendorff-Literaturpreis is a literary prize of Germany. It was first awarded in 1956 and was created in honour of Joseph Freiherr von Eichendorff. The prize, endowed with 5,000 euros, has been awarded annually by the Wangener Kreis – Society for Literature and Art of the East. The award goes to writers who are closely related to Silesian culture.

== Recipients ==
- 1956 Ernst Günther Bleisch
- 1958 Reiner Zimnik
- 1960 Kurtmartin Magiera
- 1961 Jürgen von Teichmann
- 1962 Hans-Christian Kirsch
- 1963 Jochen Hoffbauer, Dagmar von Mutius
- 1964 Egon H. Rakette
- 1965 Hans Niekrawietz
- 1966 Dagmar Nick
- 1967 Ruth Hoffmann
- 1968 Gerhard Uhde
- 1969 Hugo Hartung
- 1970 Hans Lipinsky-Gottersdorf
- 1971 Heinz Piontek
- 1972 Kurt Heynicke
- 1973 Josef Mühlberger
- 1974 Werner Klose
- 1975 Lutz Besch
- 1976 Peter Hirche, Friedrich Bischoff
- 1977 Norbert Ernst Dolezich, Maria Blucha
- 1978 Monika Taubitz
- 1979 Peter Huchel
- 1980 Ilse Langner
- 1981 Eberhard Cyran
- 1982 Christine Busta
- 1983 Ruth Storm
- 1984 Reiner Kunze
- 1985 Dietmar Scholz
- 1986 Peter Lotar
- 1987 Dietmar Grieser
- 1988 Richard Wolf
- 1989 Walter Neumann
- 1990 Otfried Preußler
- 1991 Eva Zeller
- 1992 Christian Saalberg
- 1993 Bodo Heimann
- 1994 Bernd Jentzsch
- 1995 Werner Heiduczek
- 1996 Peter Horst Neumann
- 1997 Armin Müller
- 1998 Ilse Tielsch
- 1999 Barbara von Wulffen
- 2000 Peter Härtling
- 2001 Werner Dürrson
- 2002 Urszula Kozioł
- 2003 Günter de Bruyn
- 2004 Wulf Kirsten
- 2005 Uwe Grüning
- 2006 Hans-Ulrich Treichel
- 2007 Renata Schumann
- 2008 Günther Schiwy (posthumously for his biography Eichendorff: Der Dichter in seiner Zeit)
- 2009 Gerd-Peter Eigner
- 2010 Christoph Hein
- 2011 Jörg Bernig
- 2012 Catalin Dorian Florescu
- 2013 Ulrich Schacht
- 2014 Adam Zagajewski
- 2015 Nico Bleutge
- 2016 Christian Lehnert
- 2017 Michael Krüger
- 2018 Kerstin Preiwuß
- 2019 Christa Ludwig
- 2020 Saša Stanišić for Herkunft
- 2021 Iris Wolff
- 2022 Joanna Bator
- 2023 Uljana Wolf
- 2024 Ulrike Draesner
- 2025 Michael Donhauser
