= Andreas Gryphius Prize =

German literary award

The Andreas-Gryphius Prize is a literary prize in Germany, named after the German poet Andreas Gryphius (1616–1664). The prize is awarded to authors and translators whose work reflects German culture and history in Central, Eastern and Southern Europe and that contributes to understanding between Germany and its Eastern neighbors.

The prize was established in Düsseldorf in 1957; since 1990 it has been sponsored by the Künstlergilde (artists' guild) in Esslingen, and awarded in the city of Glogów (German: Glogau), Gryphius's birthplace.

== Winners ==
- 1957 Heinz Piontek – star prize
- 1959 August Scholtis – star prize
- 1962 Karl Dedecius – promotional award
- 1963 Wolfgang Schwarz – honorary prize
- 1965
  - Josef Mühlberger
  - Peter Jokostra
- 1966 Johannes Urzidil – star prize
- 1967
  - Arnold Ulitz
  - Horst Bienek – honorary prize
- 1968 Rudolf Pannwitz
- 1969
  - Manfred Bieler
  - Oskar Pastior – promotional award
- 1970
  - Kurt Heynicke
  - Dagmar Nick – honorary prize
  - Barbara König – honorary prize
- 1971 Wolfgang Koeppen – star prize
- 1972
  - Walter Kempowski – honorary prize
  - Ilse Tielsch – honorary prize
  - Georg Hermanowski – honorary prize
  - Gertrud Fussenegger
- 1973 Hans-Jürgen Heise – honorary prize
- 1974 Peter Huchel
- 1975 Frank Thiess
- 1976
  - Karin Struck – star prize; Carl Guesmer – promotional award
  - Tamara Ehlert
- 1977
  - Reiner Kunze – star prize
  - Rose Ausländer
  - Rudolf Günter Langer
- 1978
  - Hanns Gottschalk
  - Arno Surminski
- 1979 Siegfried Lenz – star prize
- 1980 Saul Friedländer
- 1981
  - Ernst Vasovec
  - Ulrich Schacht – promotional award
- 1982 Franz Tumler
- 1983
  - Horst Bienek
  - Ulla Berkéwicz – promotional award
- 1984 Hans Sahl
- 1985 Ernst Günther Bleisch (Philosopher Günther Anders had rejected the prize for political reasons.)
- 1986 Hans Werner Richter
- 1987
  - Otfried Preußler for his complete works
  - Helga Lippelt – promotional award
- 1988 Martin Gregor-Dellin
- 1989
  - Ilse Tielsch – star prize for her complete works
  - Michael Wieck – honorary prize for Zeugnis vom Untergang Königsbergs [Account of the downfall of Königsberg]
- 1990
  - Peter Härtling – star prize
  - Christian Saalberg – honorary prize
- 1991
  - Ota Filip
  - Helga Schütz – honorary prize
  - Franz Hodjak – honorary prize
- 1992
  - Janosch (Horst Eckert) – star prize
  - Paweł Huelle – promotional award
- 1993 Dagmar Nick
- 1994 Hans-Jürgen Heise
- 1995 Andrzej Szczypiorski – star prize
- 1996
  - Jiří Gruša
  - Ruth Klüger – honorary prize
  - Olly Komenda-Soentgerath – honorary prize
- 1997 Karl Dedecius – star prize
- 1998 Milo Dor
- 1999 Stefan Chwin for his complete works, especially for the novel Tod in Danzig [Death in Danzig]
- 2009 Arno Surminski
- 2010 Renata Schumann
- 2011 Michael Zeller
- 2012 Monika Taubitz
- 2013 Hans Bergel
- 2014 Therese Chromik, Leonie Ossowski
- 2015 Erich Pawlu
- 2016 Jenny Schon
- 2017 Tina Stroheker
- 2018 Catalin Dorian Florescu
- 2019 Benedikt Dyrlich
- 2020 Traian Pop
- 2022 Bernd Kebelmann
- 2023 Ilse Hehn
- 2024 Edward Białek
- 2025
  - Franz Hodjak
  - Ursula Haas – honorary prize
