= Grete Weiskopf =

German writer of children's and young adult fiction

Weiskopf in 1955

Grete Weiskopf (11 May 1905 – 15 March 1966), known by the pseudonym Alex Wedding, was a German writer of children's and young adult fiction.

== Life ==
Born Grete Bernheim in Salzburg, she initially worked as a typist, bookseller, and bank clerk in Berlin. In 1928 she married the Czech-born author Franz Carl Weiskopf, a member of the German Communist Party and the Association of Proletarian-Revolutionary Authors. In 1931 she authored her first young adult novel, Ede und Unku, which was among the books destroyed during the Nazi book burnings. In 1933 she and her husband fled to Prague; in 1939 they fled via Paris to New York City.

After the Second World War the couple returned to Prague for a brief period. That same year, Franz began working in the diplomatic service, which led to assignments in Washington, DC and Stockholm. From 1950 to 1952 they lived in the People's Republic of China, where she worked as a translator and journalist. From 1953 until her death she lived in East Germany. She and her husband are buried in Zentralfriedhof Friedrichsfelde.

== Career ==
During her life in East Germany, Weiskopf wrote children's and young adult novels and short stories. Her two most successful books are Ede und Unku and The Arctic Ocean, which were both adapted into films. She was considered a pioneer of socialist children's literature.

== Honors ==
- She is the namesake of a literary prize, the Alex-Wedding-Preis, awarded since 1968. In 2024, the prize was merged with her husband’s own prize.
- On 27 January 2011, on the occasion of the Day of Remembrance for the Victims of Nation Socialism, a path in Friedrichshain was renamed Ede-und-Unku-Weg in memory of Weiskopf's most celebrated novel.
- Since 2009 a street on Alexanderplatz between Karl-Liebknecht-, Knebel-, and Wadzeckstrasse is named Alex-Wedding-Strasse.

== Works ==
Weiskopf's works include;

- 1931: Ede und Unku
- 1936: Das Eismeer ruft
- 1948: Die Fahne des Pfeiferhänsleins
- 1948: Söldner ohne Sold, Ein Roman für die Jugend
- 1952: Das eiserne Büffelchen
- 1961: Die Drachenbraut. Chinesische Volksmärchen
- 1963: Erinnerungen an einen Freund. Ein Gedenkbuch für F. C. Weiskopf.
- 1963: Hubert, das Flusspferd. (based on the true story of Huberta)
- 1965: Im Schatten des Baobab. Märchen und Fabeln aus Afrika

== Filmography ==
=== Adaptations ===
- 1961: Das Eismeer ruft (Ledove more vola), directed by Hanus Burger
- 1980: Als Unku Edes Freundin war, directed by Helmut Dziuba
- 1982: Das große Abenteuer des Kaspar Schmeck, directed by Gunter Friedrich
- 1984: Das Eismeer ruft, directed by Jörg Foth

=== Scripts ===
- 1957: Lissy
- 1964: Ferientage
