= Alex Wedding Prize =

The Alex Wedding Prize is a German literary prize awarded to authors of works for children and young people. It is named after children's author Grete Weiskopf-Bernheim (1905–1966), who wrote under the pen name "Alex Wedding".

From 1968 to 1990 it was awarded by the Academy of Arts of the German Democratic Republic, and since then by its successor, the Academy of Arts, Berlin. An independent three-member jury awarded the prize, valued at €5,000, on Wedding's birthday, 11 May.

In 2024, the prize was merged with her husband’s prize.

== Winners ==
- 1968: Willi Meinck
- 1969: Karl Neumann
- 1970: Kurt David
- 1971: Joachim Nowotny
- 1972: Götz R. Richter
- 1973: Herbert Friedrich
- 1974: Edith Bergner
- 1975: Horst Beseler
- 1976: Fred Rodrian
- 1977: Peter Brock
- 1978: Gotthold Gloger
- 1979: Hans Weber
- 1980: Hildegard and Siegfried Schumacher
- 1981: Klaus Beuchler
- 1982: Hannes Hüttner
- 1983: Peter Abraham
- 1984: Lilo Hardel
- 1985: Werner Lindemann
- 1986: Gunter Preuß
- 1987: Wolf Spillner
- 1988: Werner Heiduczek
- 1989: Maria Seidemann
- 1990: Walther Petri
- 1991: Anne Geelhaar and Christa Kozik
- 1992: Peter Hacks
- 1998: Klaus Kordon
- 2000: Benno Pludra
- 2003: F. K. Waechter
- 2008: Karla Schneider
- 2024 Sonja vom Brocke
