= Von Mutius =

Mutius is the surname of a historical German noble family (German: Adelsgeschlecht).

Notable people with the surname include:

- Franz Josef von Mutius (1704–1788), court and judicial councillor, chancellor of the cathedral chapter in Breslau, ennobled 1745
- Johann Karl von Mutius (1758–1816), Prussian major general
- Louis von Mutius (1796–1866), Prussian cavalry general
- Peter von Mutius (1828–1904), Prussian major general
- Wilhelm von Mutius (1832–1918), Prussian lieutenant general
- Albert von Mutius (1862–1937), Prussian lieutenant general
- Maximilian von Mutius (1865–1942), Prussian major general
- Gerhard von Mutius (1872–1934), diplomat
- Theodor von Mutius (1909–1977), German flotilla admiral
- Gerta Scharffenorth, née von Mutius (1912), political scientist and theologian
- Bernhard Ludwig von Mutius (1913–1979), secretary of the German People's Congress
- Albrecht von Mutius (1915–1985), Protestant theologian
- Carl von Mutius (1918), officer and press officer in the German UN mission in Geneva
- Dagmar von Mutius (1919–2008), German writer
- Franz von Mutius (1925–2011), administrative lawyer
- Albert von Mutius (1942), legal scholar
- Bernhard von Mutius (1949), philosopher and social scientist
- Hans-Georg von Mutius (1951), Judaist
- Erika von Mutius (born 1957), German pediatrician
