= Daniel Hensel =

German composer, musicologist, and music theorist (b.1978)

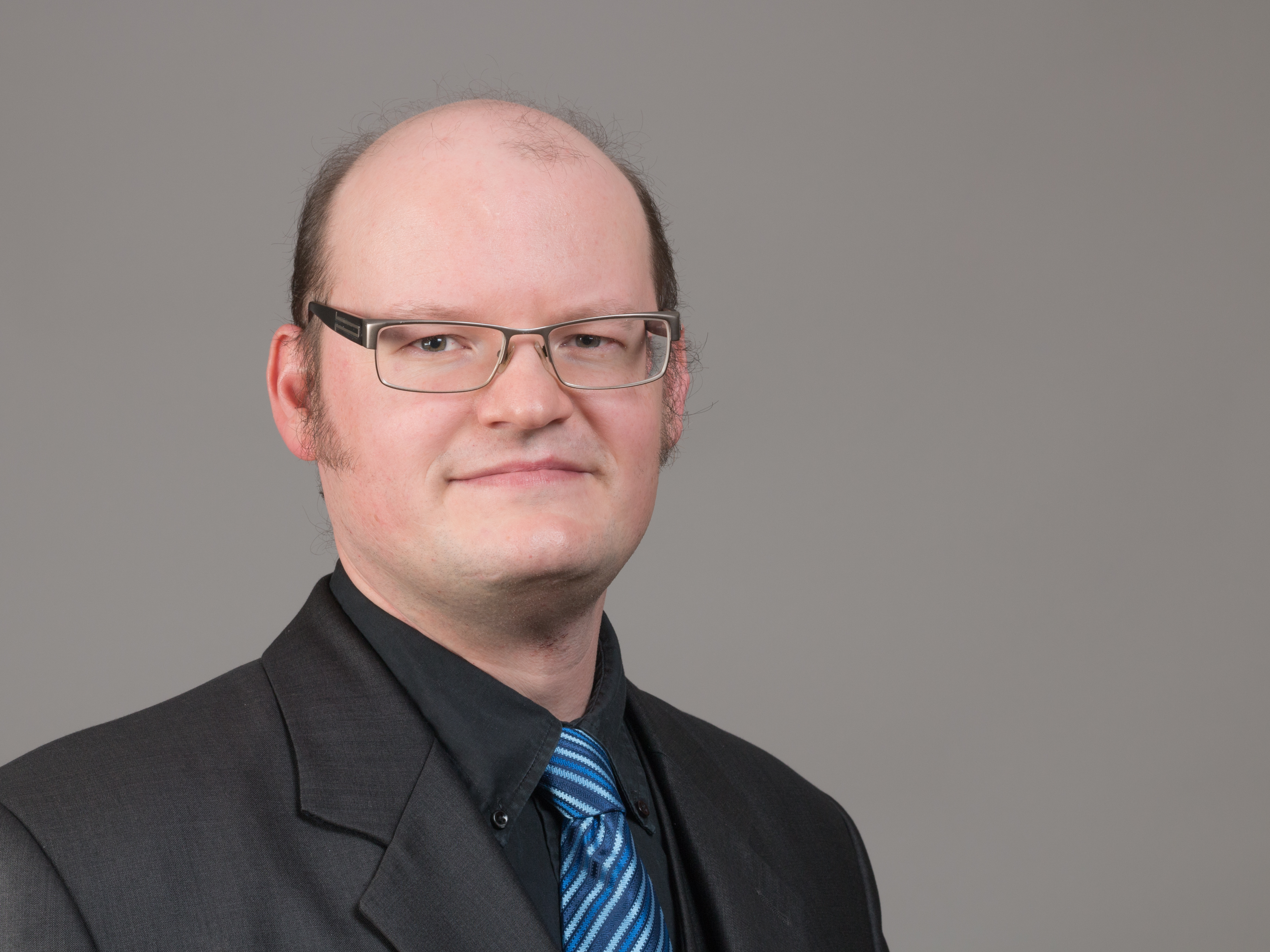
Hensel in 2014

Daniel Hensel (born 17 April 1978 in Büdingen) is a German composer, VJ, musicologist and music theorist. He is known as a composer of expressive works of all musical genres whose works can be dedicated to "a thread of a tradition leading from Schubert via Mahler to Hensel's teacher Schedl in presence.[...]" His style contains all kinds of material, such as traditional tonal or harmonic as well as noise and electronic material. His works are published by Musikverlag Doblinger in Vienna.

== Life and work ==
Hensel is a descendant of a family of musicians of light and rock music. His maternal family lives in the city of Buedingen since 1594. Hensel began his studies of composition in 1995 as a student of the Austrian composer Gerhard Schedl at Dr. Hoch's Konservatorium. From 1999 on he studied composition with Heinz Winbeck in Würzburg, and later with Manfred Trojahn in Düsseldorf where he graduated with distinction. Postgraduate studies with Michael Obst followed at the Hochschule für Musik "Franz Liszt", Weimar. He concluded his studies in musical composition in Winbeck's masterclass. In 2009 Hensel began to study musicology with Peter Ackermann and wrote a dissertation on the music of Gerhard Schedl. Hensel obtained his doctorate with "magna cum laude" on 13 July 2011.

Hensel's music was played by artists such as Carin Levine and Markus Bellheim, the Ensemble Modern, the Staatsorchester Stuttgart, and conductors such as Manfred Honeck. Several pieces were composed on behalf of festivals such as the A•DEvantgarde-Festival, young-euro.classic or Kasseler Musiktage, or institutions such as the Carl Orff Center Munich or Staatstheater Stuttgart and broadcast by several German radio stations.

In 2007, his piece "Refexions for Orchestra" was the official German musical contribution for the handover of the EU-council presidency from Germany to Portugal. The piece was played by the young sound forum of central Europe and was conducted by Sebastian Weigle. In 2008 Manfred Honeck conducted Hensel's "Chant of consecrated life" op. 18 as an "Ouverture" to the 2. Symphony of Gustav Mahler. In 2009 Hensel's arrangements of the 45th Symphony by Joseph Haydn and the 8th Symphony by Ludwig van Beethoven were played by the Young Euro Classic-China-Festivalorchestra and conducted by Muhai Tang in various Chinese cities like Shanghai and Tianjin. His string sextet "Klaerchen´s Song" op.20 had its W.P. by the Ensemble Modern under Jonathan Stockhammer and was played again by the Austrian ensemble lux in the Arnold Schönberg Center Vienna in December 2010.

In 2011 he started to work with the German author and filmmaker Edgar Reitz and one year later he started to compose electro-acoustic music besides his acoustic works.

In the same year, his dissertation concerning the music of Gerhard Schedl was published and in 2012 he edited Emanuel Aloys Förster´s basso continuo school including Karl Weigl´s biography on Förster.

Hensel is a member of the German composers association, Austrian Composers Association, ISCM-Austria and the GEMA.

Since 2013 Hensel is also performing visual arts combined with his electronic pieces.

In 2016 he obtained his post-doctoral lecturer's qualification in systematical musicology and has become a member of the philosophical faculty of Martin Luther University of Halle-Wittenberg. The title of the habilitation treatise is: "Modus, Klang- und Zeitgestaltung in Motetten Orlando di Lassos und Giovanni Pierluigi da Palestrinas". (Mode, time-management, and sound design in motets by Orlando di Lasso and Giovanni Pierluigi da Palestrina) for which the software-developer Ingo Jache and Hensel developed the music analyzing Software PALESTRiNIZER. The treatise was published under the title "Beiträge zur Musikinformatik".

2017 Hensel also composed music for children after poems by James Krüss. For the last years, Hensel composed electro-acoustic works on behalf of hr2-kultur. His electro-acoustic works have received several grants and have been broadcast on BR-Klassik, among others. Hensel is recognized as a highly in-demand educator in higher education, as evidenced by his simultaneous appointments at several distinct universities.

== Personal ==
Hensel and the Polish sociologist Dorota Ewa Hensel have been married since 2005 and have five children. He and his wife have been spending every summer in Radzyń Podlaski, Poland, for 18 years.

== Works ==
Op.16 Reflexions for orchestra composed for the Festival: Europe, the blue star. 2222\433\Timp\Hrp\ Strings 10\8\6\4\2 Junges Klangforum Mitte Europa, Sebastian Weigle

Op.17 Concerto for piano and orchestra 2222\2\2\2\1\Timp\2Perc.\Hf\Cel\ Strings 10\8\6\4\2 WP.:06.10.08 8:00 p.m., Hochschule fuer Musik Wuerzburg

Op.18 "Chant of consecrated life", for big orchestra, on behalf of the state opera Stuttgart, dedicated to Prof. Heinz Winbeck, WP.: 12.07.08, Stuttgart, Liederhalle, state orchestra of Stuttgart, Manfred Honeck, Conductor

Op.19 "The Young Maidservant" after poems by Georg Trakl, for Flute, Clarinet and String quartet WP.:02.07.10 Francfort and 02.09.10 Darmstadt, Germany, by ensemble Darmstadt, Marko Zdralek

Op.20 Stringsextet "Klärchen´s Song", dedicated to Dieter Rexroth, W.P. 11.07.09, Alte Brüderkirche Kassel, by Ensemble Modern and Jonathan Stockhammer available at Musikverlag Doblinger, Vienna

Op.21 "Echoes and chants from the interior", dedicated to Rafal Zambrzycki-Payne

Op.22 Fleur du mal, a dramatic aria for Tenor and big orchestra, dedicated to maestro Manfred Honeck

Op.23 "Cardillac-Suite", music for the silent movie "Cardillac-Suite" for Edgar Reitz´ "Cardillac-Suite", for Cl\Kl\Hrn\Trp\3Perc\Hrp\Cel\2Vl\2Vla\2Vcl\Cb

Op.24, No.1: Study No.1, Music for Computers, realized with the software Csound.

Op.24, No.2: Study No.2, Music for Computers, realized with the software Csound.

Op.25 "Duo for Violin and Violoncello", "Self-destruction and swan song", WP: 19 April 2013, Alte Schmiede Vienna, by Marianna Oczkowska and Tomasz Skweres, available at Musikverlag Doblinger, Wien-München

Op.28 "The apparent death", from "Des Knaben Wunderhorn", for Fl., Cl., Pf., Sopran, Vl. and Vcl, on behalf of the ÖGZM, WP: 6.23.16 at Österreichischen Kulturforum at the Austrian embassy in Berlin by Ensemble Platypus

Op.29 Trio for Violin Cello and Piano

Op.30 "Bohemian cemetery", for Soprano and Orchestra after a Poem by Jörg Bernig.

Op.31 "Cantiones Budingensis" for Computer.

Op.32 "Burn, Witch burn!" an electroacoustic composition on behalf of the hr2-kultur

Op.33 "Deaf for the wild rage of life!", Commissioned by the Philharmonic State Orchestra Hamburg, Beethoven-Spiegelung IV, for 8 woodwinds, double bass, and live electronics

Op.34 "Tale from someone who set out to learn to dream", three little pieces for orchestra.

Op.35 "But where there is danger, there is also what is saving" an electroacoustic composition on behalf of hr2-kultur

Op.36 "All The King's Tags", an electroacoustic composition commissioned by hr2-kultur

Op.37 "Claustrophobia", an electroacoustic composition commissioned by the Hessian Cultural Foundation

Op.38 1st symphony "A song in the higher choir. From the deep I call LORD to you"; electroacoustic; dedicated to the memory of my father; Speaker Jörg Bernig and Anna-Maximiliane Geraldine Hensel; funded by NEUSTART KULTUR "Stipendienprogramm 2021" of the GERMAN German federal ministry for culture and GEMA; Original broadcast on September 22, 2022, at 10:05 p.m. on BR Klassik, composed 2021-2022, based on a eulogy by Anna-Maximiliane Geraldine Hensel and poems from "wüten gegen die stunden" by Jörg Bernig

Op.39 "sonus spatium", 2. movement for J.B. Bach's third Brandenburg-Concerto

Op.40 "Trauer", for high soprano, harmonium, harp, celesta, and live electronics, based on Stefan George's "Trauer I", funded by NEUSTART KULTUR "Scholarship Program 2022" of the German federal ministry for culture and the Deutscher Musikrat, composed Aug-Sept 2022

Op.41 "Energies..." for small clarinet, clarinet, bass clarinet, violin, viola, cello, and piano, funded by NEUSTART KULTUR "Scholarship Program 2022" German federal ministry for culture and the Deutscher Musikrat, composed Sept.-Dec. 2022 for the 150th birthday of Arnold Schoenberg

Op.42 "EM-Suite", commissioned by hr2-kultur, electroacoustic work in seven movements, composed February–March 2023

Op.43 "Sinfonietta", composed May to June 2023

== Movies ==
Study No.1 Sonic Visualization of op.24 No.1

Study No.1 Picturization as a video animation of op.24. No.1

Study No.2 Picturization as a video animation of op.24. No.2

== Awards ==
- 2007 Gmünd/Carinthia at "Die musikalische Welt des Wassers", undoped promotional award "Recommendation" for the second stringquartet "Im Nebel"
- 2020 International Eisenach Bach Composition Prize 2020, undoped promotional award "Recommendation" for the orchestra piece "Tale from someone who set out to learn to dream", op.34

== Publications ==
- Wilhelm Friedemann Bach. Epigone oder Originalgenie, verquere Erscheinung oder großer Komponist?, Stuttgart: ibidem 2011, ISBN 978-3-8382-0178-8 (in German)
- Von der Einheit in der Vielfalt oder der Lust am Subjektiven: Die Musik Gerhard Schedls, dargestellt an seiner Instrumentalmusik, Stuttgart: ibidem 2011, ISBN 978-3-8382-0278-5 (in German)
- Anleitung zum General-Bass (1805), einschließlich der Biographie: Karl Weigl: Emanuel Aloys Förster (1913), Hensel, Daniel (Ed.), Stuttgart ibidem 2012, ISBN 978-3-8382-0378-2 (in German)
- Beiträge zur Musikinformatik, Modus, Klang- und Zeitgestaltung in Lassus- und Palestrina-Motetten. Springer Fachmedien, Wiesbaden 2017, ISBN 978-3-658-18272-4 (Print), ISBN 978-3-658-18273-1 (electronic) (in German)
- Elementar-Lehrbuch der Harmonie- und Generalbasslehre, Reprint der Ausgabe Linz 1841, mit handschriftlichen Eintragungen Anton Bruckners, kommentiert und mit einer Studie versehen von Daniel Hensel, hrg. von Andreas Lindner/Klaus Petermayr, Linz 2017, ISBN 978-3-903196-01-8. (in German)

== Essays ==
- "Simon Sechter, seine Fundamentalbass-Theorie und ihre Auswirkungen auf die musikalische Konstruktion im Werk Anton Bruckners", in: Bruckner-Jahrbuch 2011 - 2014, hrg. von Andreas Lindner und Klaus Petermayr, Linz 2015, ISBN 978-3902681300. (in German)
- Das Handexemplar Bruckners des "Elementar-Lehrbuchs der Harmonie- und Generalbasslehre von Johann August Dürrnberger"., in: Andreas Lindner und Klaus Petermayr (Hrsg.): Brucknerjahrbuch 2015–17. Linz 2017, ISBN 978-3-903196-00-1. (in German)
- Der Neapolitaner und andere tonale Aspekte in Weberns op.10, Nr.4. In: Archiv für Musikwissenschaft, Band 76, Dezember 2019, Heft 4, pp 307–314.(in German)
- Modale Klangstrukturen in Madrigalen Giovanni Pierluigi da Palestrinas und ihre Analyse durch die Software PALESTRiNIZER In: Archiv für Musikwissenschaft, Band 79, Juni 2022, Heft 2, pp 153–171 (in German)
- Bergs Op. 2 – ein weiterer Versuch einer semantischen Analyse auf Basis der Harmonik In: Archiv für Musikwissenschaft, Band 79, Oktober 2022, Heft 3, pp 189–206 (in German)

== Articles ==
- Hensel, Daniel: Heinz Winbeck, in: Komponisten der Gegenwart (KDG), 65. Nflg, 12/19, edition text+kritik München 2019 (in German)
- Hensel, Daniel: Gerhard Schedl, in: Komponisten der Gegenwart (KDG), 66 Nflg, 1/20 edition text+kritik München 2020 (in German)

== Radio ==
- "I've done my job ... Heinz Winbeck. A broadcast by Daniel Hensel on hr2-kultur" (original: Ich hab' meine Arbeit getan..." Heinz Winbeck, eine Sendung von Daniel Hensel, auf hr2-kultur).(in German)
- „Musik is an addiction“ – The composer Gerhard Schedl, A broadcast by Daniel Hensel on hr2-kultur.(in German)

== Discography ==
Streaming and digital publishing

- Duo für Viola und Tuba op.7, Garth Knox, Gérard Buquet
- Fünf kleine Klavierstücke, Op. 3, No. 1 (20 Years-Edition) [Live] - EP, András Hamary
- Electroacoustic Music 10 Years Edition (2022 Remaster), EP, Überblick, Apple Music, iTunes, Amazon Music, Spotify
- DANIEL HENSEL „BURN, WITCH BURN!“, Album, Streaming
- Daniel Hensel, „Musik der Pandemie“, Album, Tr.1. Sinfonie No.1 „Ein Lied im höhern Chor“, Tr.2 Claustrophobia, Streaming
- Daniel Hensel, "Requiem der jungen Hoffnungen", op.6, on Apple Music, Amazon Music, Spotify
- Daniel Hensel, Ad LXVI Annorum, Single, Streaming
- Daniel Hensel, "Der Scheintod op.28" and "Energien" op.41, Platypus Ensemble, Streaming

== Scholarships ==
- 2006 by Paul und Käthe Kick Foundation
- 2007 Scholarship by GEMA-Foundation
- 2007 Scholarship by "Musikalische Akademie Würzburg e.V. -- Gesellschaft der Freunde und Förderer der Hochschule für Musik Würzburg e.V."
- 2008 by Wolfgang Fischer und Maria Fischer-Flach Stiftung: Scholarship
- 2011 by Paul und Käthe Kick Foundation
- 2019 by "Förderung und Hilfsfonds" of DKV
- 2020 by "Förderung und Hilfsfonds" of DKV
- 2020 by InnerWheel
- 2021 by "Hessische Kulturstiftung"
- 2021 GEMA scholarship as part of the NEUSTART KULTUR scholarship program for the composition of the 1st symphony
- 2022 DMR grant as part of the NEUSTART KULTUR grant program
