= Werner Lindemann =

German writer (1926–1993)

- Born: 7 October 1926; Wolfen, Germany
- Died: 9 February 1993 (aged 66); Zickhausen, Mecklenburg-Western Pomerania, Germany
- Occupations: Poet, writer
- Years active: 1957–1993
- Spouse: Gitta Lindemann
- Children: Till Lindemann
- Awards: Alex-Wedding-Preis (1985)

Werner Lindemann (7 October 1926 – 9 February 1993) was a German writer and poet. He was the father of Till Lindemann, the lead vocalist of German industrial metal band Rammstein.

== Life ==
Werner Lindemann was born into a family of farm workers. He grew up in Alt-Jeßnitz Gutsdorf near Wolfen in Saxony-Anhalt. In 1941, aged 15, he was apprenticed to a farmer. Between 1943 and 1945, he served in the German Army. After the end of World War II, he studied natural sciences at Halle. In 1949, he began to teach agriculture-related subjects at a vocational school. Between 1955 and 1957, he studied at the Johannes R. Becher Institute of Literature at Leipzig. There, he worked as editor of the student magazine Forum, became director of the city House of Culture, and from 1959, worked as a freelance writer. He co-founded the Künstlerkolonie Drispeth ("Drispeth Artist's Colony"), where he lived for over 20 years, along with Joachim Seyppel, Joochen Laabs, and Gerhard and Christa Wolf.

Lindemann wrote his first poems shortly after the war. They were published in a 1959 book Stationen, which also included autobiographical material. The writer became known for his children's books in the 1970s, in which he showed a poetic vision of the everyday. In addition to his children's poetry, from the 1980s, he published several books of prose, such as Aus dem Drispether Bauernhaus ("From the farmhouse at Drispeth") and The Roggenmuhme. These and other books were based on observations and memories of his youth. He describes nature, family life in the countryside, and day-to-day life under the socialist regime. For example, in the book Mike Oldfield im Schaukelstuhl: Notizen eines Vaters ("Mike Oldfield in the Rocking Chair: Notes of a Father"), Lindemann contrasted the memories of the narrator, a parent, the views and ambitions of his son; the book remarked on the differences of character among educated people in different social systems, but also showed their similarities.

On many occasions, he gave talks in schools to bring poetry to children. He was a frequent visitor to the Grundschule Elisabethwiese elementary school in Rostock. After his death, the school changed its name to Werner-Lindemann-Grundschule on 7 October 1994. The ceremony was attended by his widow, journalist Gitta Lindemann.

In 1985, the Academy of Arts in Berlin awarded him the Alex-Wedding-Preis, for his merits in the field of socialist children's literature.

== Personal life ==
Lindemann was married to the journalist Gitta Lindemann.

He died on February 9, 1993. He is buried in Zickhusen near Schwerin.

Also, Till Lindemann wrote a poem in his fathers name, for his 100th birthday, its called "Vater".

== See also ==
- Rammstein
- Christoph Schneider
- Neue Deutsche Härte
- First Arsch

== Bibliography ==
- Lindemann, Werner (1970). Poesiealbum 35. Berlin: Verlag Neues Leben.
- Lindemann, Werner (1976). Die Schule macht die Türen auf. Berlin: Der Kinderbuchverlag.
- Lindemann, Werner (1966). Was schmeckt den Tieren. Berlin: Kinderbuchverlag.
- Lindemann, Werner (1985). Ein Nest, versteckt auf dichten Zweigen. Berlin: Der Kinderbuchverlag.
- Lindemann, Werner. Das kleine Kamel und andere Märchen aus Kasachstan. Berlin: Kinderbuchverlag. (exact year not specified in catalog records)
- Lindemann, Werner. Die Roggenmuhme: Kleingeschichten. Berlin: Kinderbuchverlag.
- Lindemann, Werner. Landtage: Gedichte.
- Lindemann, Werner. Unterwegs aufgeschrieben: Geschichten, Gedichte u. Lieder.
- Lindemann, Werner (1988). Mike Oldfield im Schaukelstuhl: Notizen eines Vaters (Reissued 2006 and 2020 with foreword by Till Lindemann ed.). The work reflects on the author's temporary cohabitation with his 19-year-old son in rural Mecklenburg in the early 1980s, including observations of intergenerational differences, the son's apprenticeship in a production cooperative (LPG), and personal memories.
