= Monika Taubitz =

German poet and writer

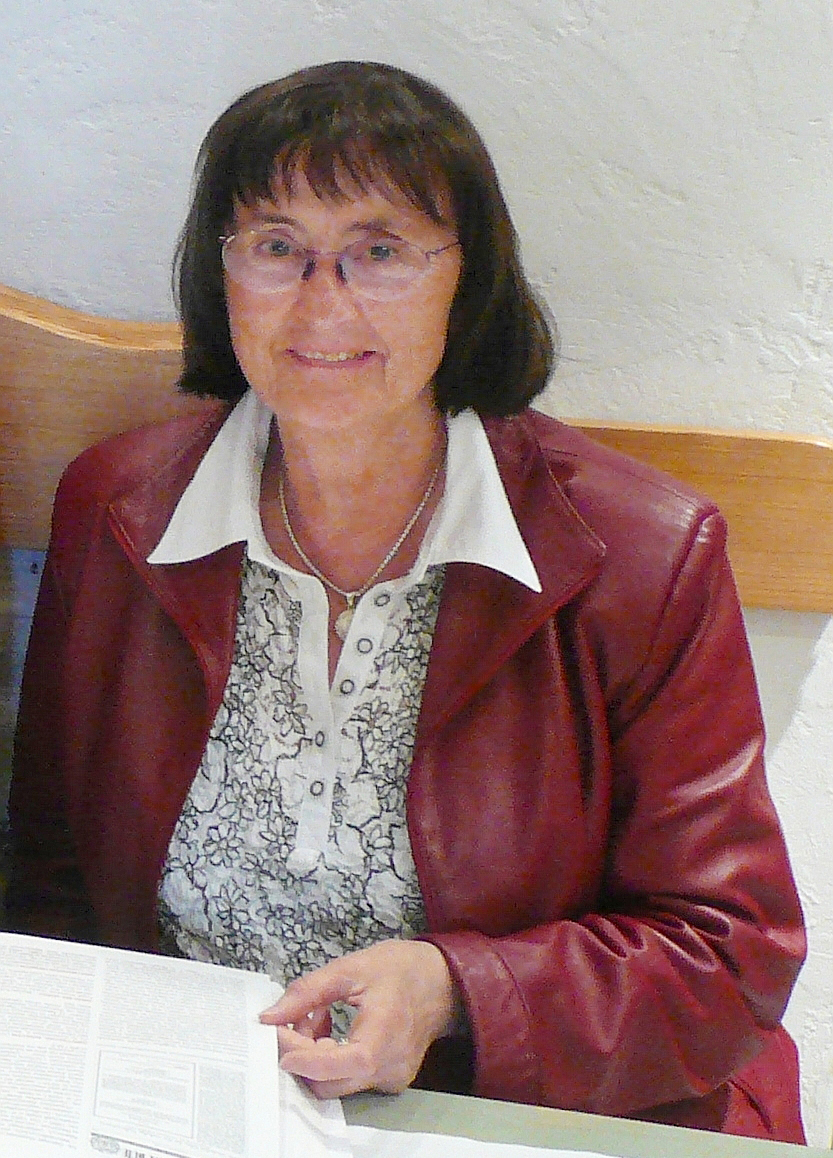
- M. Taubitz in Skowronki, May 2012
- Born: 2 September 1937 (age 89); Breslau, Province of Lower Silesia, German Reich
- Known for: Prose, poetry, radio drama
- Notable work: Durch Lücken im Zaun; Winteralbum; Almuts Briefe; Asche und Rubin
- Awards: Order of Merit of the Federal Republic of Germany; Benemerenti medal

Monika Taubitz (born 2 September 1937) is a German poet and writer. She is also associated with Silesia and Kłodzko Land.

== Biography ==
Taubitz was born in what was then Breslau on 2 September 1937. She spent her early years in Markt Bohrau. After her father's death, she lived with her mother at her family’s home in Breslau. Fearing bombings, they moved in 1944 to her paternal grandfather's house in Eisersdorf in Kłodzko Land. In 1946, after being expelled to Germany, she ended up in Nordenham, State of Hanover, and later, in 1951, in the Allgäu region.

Taubitz attended a teacher training high school in Ochsenhausen and then studied at the Pädagogisches Institut in Weingarten, Baden-Württemberg (since 1962, Pädagogische Hochschule Weingarten). After her studies, she worked as a teacher. Since 1965, she has lived in Meersburg on Lake Constance. For some time, Taubitz was involved as a guide at the museum of the poet Annette von Droste-Hülshoff in Meersburg Castle, which was restored after World War II by Helena von Bothmer-Davis.

Taubitz is a member of numerous artistic associations and served as the chairwoman of the Wangener Kreis – Society for Literature and Art of the East in Wangen im Allgäu from 1996 to 2011. She is currently its honorary chairwoman.

Taubitz has strong family ties to Kłodzko Land and Silesia. Her grandfather's brothers were Benno Taubitz, a long-serving priest and the first pastor of the Polanica parish (1913–1940), and Joseph Taubitz, the pastor of the Szczytna parish. Her father, Josef Taubitz (1882–1941), was born in Altheide-Bad and spent 32 years as a teacher in Markt Bohrau. He was also a composer, creating choral works, including Beautiful Fisherwoman (with text by Heinrich Heine), several liturgical songs, and a grand mass with orchestral accompaniment. The godfather and music teacher of the writer’s grandfather, Alfons Tobias Taubitz (1859–1939), was the composer Ignaz Reimann. The grandfather worked as a teacher in Altheide-Bad from 1875 to 1882 and later as the head of a primary school and choir director in Eisersdorf for 42 years. It was in his home that the writer, as a child, spent the final period of World War II after leaving bombed Breslau in 1944. Thirty years later, these memories inspired her book Durch Lücken im Zaun (transl. Through Gaps in the Fence), written from the perspective of the child she was then, an eight-year-old.

For many years, Taubitz writer has maintained close contact with her former homeland and its current residents, participating in numerous author, academic, and regional meetings. Accompanied by her friend Anne Wachter and Sudeten guide Stanisław Fraus, she traveled across Kłodzko Land, experiences which are reflected in her works, including poems published in the collection This Land Gave Me Its Word: Poems about Silesia from 2006.

Thanks to her efforts, Adam Zagajewski was awarded the Eichendorff-Literaturpreis in 2014, presented by the Wangener Kreis – Society for Literature and Art of the East.

Professor Edward Białek from the Institute of Germanic Philology at the University of Wrocław believes that Taubitz has transitioned from focusing on the loss of her homeland due to the so-called "expulsion" to accepting reality and forming close, friendly relations with many Polish residents of Lower Silesia and Kłodzko Land. Her work as the chairwoman of Wangener Kreis has changed not only perceptions of Poland but also the consciousness of a generation of German writers and poets originating from Silesia.

== Characteristics of Taubitz's work ==
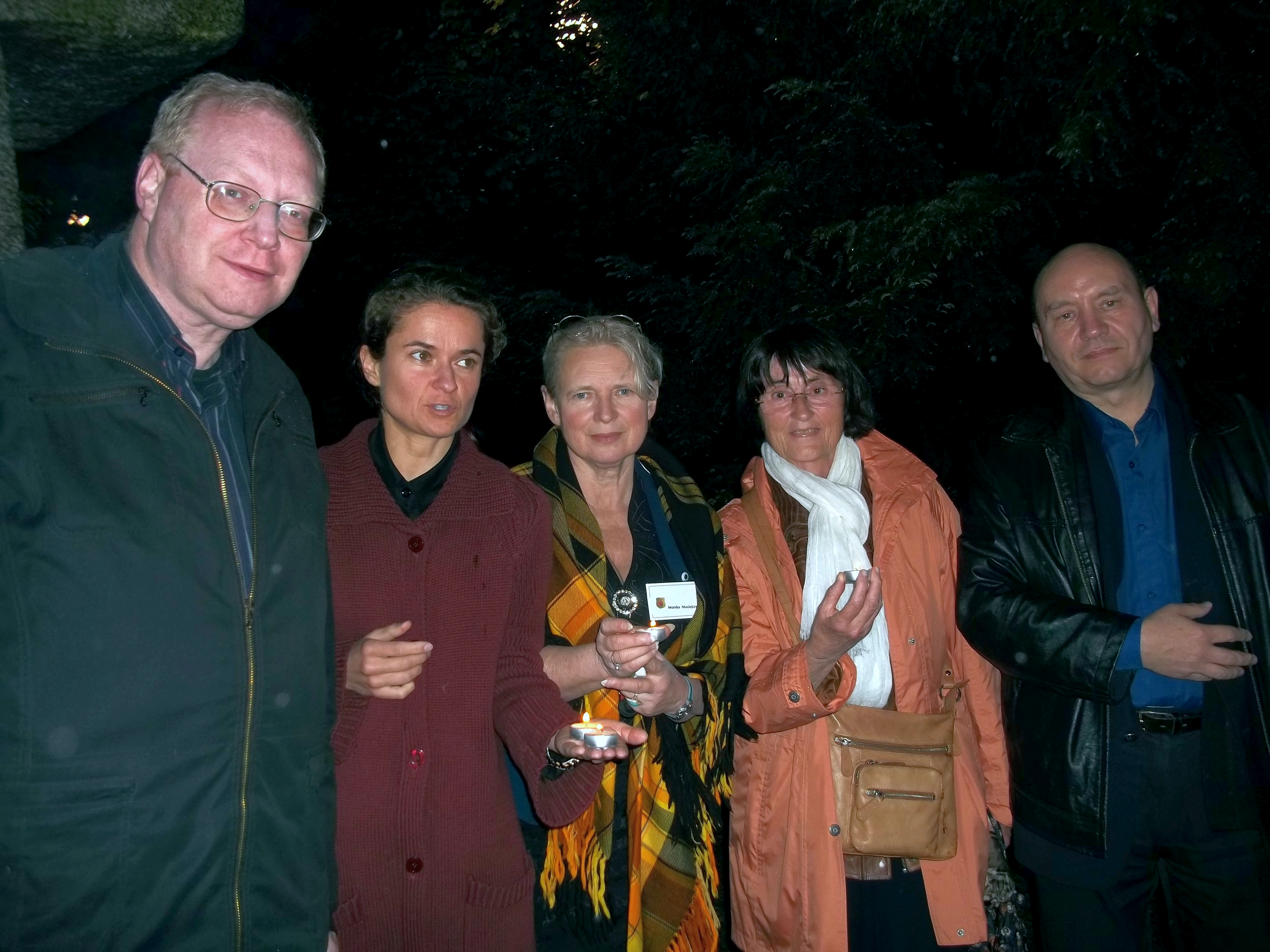
Poets from Ukraine, Poland, and Germany – from left to right: Oleksandr Gordon, Sylwia Grzybowska, Monika Maciejczyk, Monika Taubitz, and Henryk Grzybowski light candles in front of the monument of Adam Mickiewicz in Polanica, 17 May 2014

Taubitz is a poet and prose writer, authoring novels, short stories, essays, and radio dramas. Her literary work and social activities have been the subject of critical literary analysis, with several master's theses, doctoral dissertations, and habilitation papers dedicated to exploring her contributions. Some notable works include:

- Justyna Kubocz's monograph From the Land of God to the Swabian Sea. Monika Taubitz as a Writer and Cultural Organizer, which not only presents the profile of the writer and analyzes her literary achievements but also documents her involvement in the cultural life of the Lake Constance region and her efforts towards German-Polish reconciliation.
- Katarzyna Nowakowska's book Faces and Contexts of Identity in German-language Literature of the 20th and 21st Centuries, which addresses the key aspect of literary work – the search for one's "self" and the definition of individual and group identity.
- Justyna Kubocz's work A Land Emerges from Memory – Images of Silesia in Monika Taubitz's Poetry, in the volume Silesia as a Literary Province: Literature between Regionalism and Universalism.

For her 75th birthday, a Festschrift titled Selected from Silesia: Essays on Literature from the 18th to the 21st Century was dedicated to her, featuring chapters on her work, including:

- Justyna Kubocz's essay Monika Taubitz and Poland: An Attempt at Assessment.
- Paweł Zimniak's essay Mountain Landscapes as Spaces of Emotion: On the Performativity of Spatial Experience in Monika Taubitz's Texts.

At the international scientific conference Cultural Life of Kłodzko Land held in Wrocław in 2015, several papers were dedicated to Taubitz's writing:

- Paweł Zimniak's (University of Zielona Góra) 'Random Flotsam' – 'Naked Roots' – 'Cast-off (Air) Anchor'. On the In-Between Space of Monika Taubitz's Refugee Child.
- Katarzyna Nowakowska's (University of Warsaw) On the Poetry of Monika Taubitz.
- Iwona Czech's (Szczawno-Zdrój) The Issue of Expulsion in the Prose of Monika Taubitz.

For her 80th birthday, a Festschrift titled To the Land That Gave Her Its Word was dedicated to her, with chapters on her biography, works, and reader reception, including essays by Justyna Kubocz and Paweł Zimniak.

== Awards, distinctions, and honors ==
Taubitz has been honored with numerous awards, including prestigious ones such as:

- The Eichendorff-Literaturpreis (1978)
- The Andreas Gryphius Prize (2012)
- The Nikolaus Lenau Award (2016) for Flußleben
- The Edith Heine Poetry Prize from the Kulturwerk Schlesien Foundation (2022)
- The Cultural Award of Silesia from the State of Lower Saxony (supporting award, 1980),

moreover:

- Hörspiel- und Erzählerpreis des Ostdeutschen Kulturrates (1981),
- Preis der Harzburger Literaturtage (1983)

She has also received the following distinctions and honors:

- The Papal Benemerenti medal (1976)
- The Medal of the State of Baden-Württemberg (2013) for her work on behalf of both her Silesian homeland and her current region of Baden-Württemberg, as well as for fostering understanding between Germans and the people of Eastern Europe
- The Cross of Merit on Ribbon of the Order of Merit of the Federal Republic of Germany (2014) for her literary achievements and "building bridges" between Germans and Poles
- Honorary citizenship of the city of Meersburg (2018), the 11th recipient in 150 years and the first woman to receive it.
- On June 2, 2025, Monika Taubitz was awarded the "Merito de Wratislavia" medal for her literary works in prose and poetry about her hometown of Wrocław. The mayor of Wrocław called her "Ambassador of Wrocław".

== Works ==
Some of Taubitz's notable works include:

- Fallende Sterne. Gedichte (in German). Buxheim: Martin Verlag. 1968. OCLC 749967597.
- Schatten über dem Brunnen (in German). Buxheim: Martin Verlag. 1971. OCLC 74136419.
- Probeflug. Gedichte (in German). Heidenheim: Jerratsch. 1974. OCLC 1006268482.
- Schlesien – Tagebuch einer Reise (in German). Heidenheim: Jerratsch. 1977. OCLC 741729997.
- Durch Lücken im Zaun (in German). Heidenheim; Brenz: Jerratsch. 1977. ISBN 978-3-921519-14-1.
- Netze werfend. Gedichte (in German). Heidenheim; Brenz: Jerratsch. 1978. ISBN 978-3-921519-24-0.
- Dir, Spinnweb Zeit, ins Netz gegangen (in German). Esslingen: Die Künstlergilde. 1983. OCLC 74675201.
- Gestörte Befragung. Ein Hörspiel mit Textcollagen (in German). Stuttgart: Studien-Verl. 1981. OCLC 315068376.
- Treibgut (in German). Stuttgart: Butzon & Bercker. 1983. ISBN 978-3-7666-9304-4.
- Dort geht Katharina oder Gesang im Feuerofen (in German). Sigmaringen: J. Thorbecke. 1984. ISBN 978-3-7995-1644-0.
- Abstellgleis (in German). Dresden: Neisse Verlag. 2007. ISBN 978-3-934038-78-3.
- Treibgut eine Kindheit nach dem Krieg (in German). Würzburg Bergstadtverl. 1983. ISBN 978-3-87057-299-0.
- Leonhards Haus (in German). Dresden: Neisse Verlag. 2009. ISBN 978-3-940310-53-8.
- Winteralbum (in German). Dresden: Neisse Verlag. 2011. ISBN 978-3-86276-017-6.
- Taubitz, Monika (2011). Im Zug – nebenbei. Gedichte von unterwegs (in German). Neisse Verlag. ISBN 978-3-86276-028-2.
- Almuts Briefe (in German). Dresden: Neisse Verlag. 2013. ISBN 978-3-86276-108-1.
- Flußleben (in German). Dresden: Neisse Verlag. 2013. ISBN 978-83-7977-012-0.
- Volkskalender für Schlesier (in German). Landshut: Isar Aufstieg Verlag. 2016. ISBN 978-3-7612-0350-7.
- Asche und Rubin. Helene von Bothmer. Eine Biographie (in German). Dresden: Neisse Verlag. 2016. ISBN 978-3-86276-191-3.
- Lob der Ebene. Gedichte (in German). Dresden: Neisse Verlag. 2016. ISBN 978-3-86276-217-0.
- Jakobs Gärten (in German). Dresden: Neisse Verlag. 2019. ISBN 978-3-86276-281-1.
- Für einen Lidschlag nur. Gedichte (in German). Dresden: Neisse Verlag. 2021. ISBN 978-83-7977-562-0.
- Tilmanns Frau und andere Erzählungen (in German). Dresden: Neisse Verlag. 2021. ISBN 978-3-86276-320-7.
- Breslau zur Zeit der Pandemie Gedichte (in German). Dresden: Neisse Verlag. 2021. ISBN 978-83-7977-651-1.
- Miniaturen der Erinnerung (in German). Dresden: Neisse Verlag. 2022. ISBN 978-3-86276-338-2.
- Wellenschrift Gedichte (in German). Eggingen: Edition Isele. 2023. ISBN 978-3-86142-638-7.

In Poland, several of her works have been published by Atut publishing house from Wrocław:

- Kubocz, Justyna, ed. (2006). Ein Land gab mir sein Wort. Gedichte über Schlesien / Ten kraj dał mi słowo swoje. Wiersze o Śląsku (in German and Polish). ISBN 978-83-7432-291-1.
- Kubocz, Justyna; Pacholski, Jan, eds. (2007). Przez dziurę w płocie. Opowieść z dzieciństwa 1944-1946 (in Polish). ISBN 978-83-7432-182-2.
- Kubocz, Justyna; Białek, Edward, eds. (2008). Próba nurkowania (in Polish). ISBN 978-83-7432-411-3.
- Kubocz, Justyna; Białek, Edward, eds. (2009). U niewidzialnych brzegów (in Polish). ISBN 978-83-7432-535-6.
- Nikodemska, Mirosława; Białek, Edward, eds. (2014). Flußleben. Żywoty rzeki (in Polish). ISBN 978-3-86276-118-0.
- Banachowicz, Joanna Małgorzata, ed. (2017). Pochwała równiny (in Polish). Oficyna Wydawnicza ATUT - Wrocławskie Wydawnictwo Oświatowe. ISBN 978-83-7977-270-4.
- Nowakowska, Katarzyna; Białek, Edward, eds. (2021). Für einen Lidschlag nur. Gedichte / Na jeden tylko ruch powieki. Wiersze (in German and Polish). Neisse Verlag. ISBN 978-83-7977-562-0.
- Białek, Edward, ed. (2022). Wrocław w czasach pandemii (in Polish). ISBN 978-83-7977-731-0.

Published by Quaestio:

- W pociągu – en passant. Wiersze pisane w drodze (in Polish). Wrocław: Quaestio. 2012. ISBN 978-83-62571-25-3.
- Tadla-Matkowska, Beata; Białek, Edward, eds. (2018). Nimm eine Möwenfeder... Weź pióro mewy... (in German and Polish). Wrocław: Quaestio. ISBN 978-83-65815-13-2.
- Kubocz, Justyna; Białek, Edward, eds. (2012). Stillgelegte Gleise. Martwy tor (in German and Polish). Wrocław: Quaestio. ISBN 978-83-62571-35-2.

Other works include:

- Maciejczyk, Monika; Věra, Kopecka, eds. (2018). Antologia pokoju / Antologie míru / Friedensbuch (in German and Polish). Oficyna Wydawnicza Ston 2. ISBN 978-83-7273-922-3.
