= Ernst Glaeser =

German author

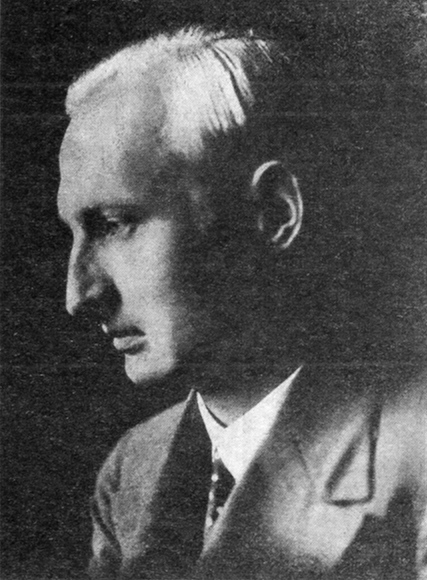
- Born: 29 July 1902; Butzbach, Grand Duchy of Hesse, German Empire
- Died: 8 February 1963 (aged 60); Mainz, Rhineland-Palatinate, West Germany
- Occupation: Author
- Known for: Jahrgang 1902

Ernst Glaeser (29 July 1902 – 8 February 1963) was a German writer, known for his best-selling pacifist novel Jahrgang 1902 ("Born in 1902"). He was associated with the political left, and went into exile in Switzerland at the start of the Nazi era after his books had been publicly burned. However, he returned to Germany in 1939, a decision that was attacked by other exiles.

== Life ==
=== Early years ===
Ernst Glaeser was born on 29 July 1902 in Butzbach, Hesse. His family was Lutheran. In 1912 the family moved when his father became a magistrate in Groß-Gerau, Hesse. Ernst Glaeser attended a humanistic secondary school in Darmstadt, Hesse. He then studied law, philosophy and German subjects at Freiburg im Breisgau, Brussels and Munich. He became a journalist, novelist, essayist and wrote radio plays.

After graduation, Glaeser worked as a dramaturge at the "New Theater" in Frankfurt. Under the Weimar Republic he was put on trial in Kassel in 1927 when one of his books was said to be blasphemous. From 1928 to 1930 he was literary editor at the Southwest German Radio, and a member of the staff of the Frankfurter Zeitung. He used the pseudonyms Anton Ditschler, Alexander Ruppel, Erich Meschede and Ernst Töpfer.

=== Literary success ===
Glaeser became a pacifist, and perhaps vaguely flirted with Communism. In 1928 he published Jahrgang 1902 ("Born in 1902" (Note: Jahrgang 1902 literally means "Class 1902". Viking Press published an American edition in 1929 entitled Class of 1902, a misleading translation since that term would be used in the US for students who graduated in 1902, rather than who were born in 1902. The common translation "Born in 1902" does not capture the sense of Jahrgang 1902 as a set of people who all became liable to being drafted into the army at the same time. The Jahrgang 1902 were too young to be drafted in World War I. The French publisher V. Attinger translated the title as Classe 22, the term that would be used for that age group in France.)), a novel that was translated into 24 languages and earned him an international reputation. Jahrgang 1902 is an autobiographical novel about youthful political and sexual awakening in a small German town before and during World War I (1914–18). The tone is both melancholy and humorous. He had further success with his 1930 novel Frieden ("Peace"). Left wing intellectuals viewed his novels as progressive. In 1930 he was invited to the attend the Second International Conference of Revolutionary Writers in Kharkiv, Ukraine.

=== Nazi era ===
On 10 May 1933 the Nazis made a formal ceremony of burning Glaeser's books (“Against decadence and moral decline! For discipline and custom in the family and the state! I hand over the writings of Heinrich Mann, Ernst Glaeser and Erich Kästner to the flame"), which were removed from the public libraries. He moved to Prague in 1934, and then to Switzerland. In his novel The Last Civilian (Zürich 1935) Glaeser describes Nazism as an epidemic and Hitler as a hysteric. He attributes Hitler's success to the loss of morale and wealth of the petty bourgeoisie. Glaeser had left Germany due to fear rather than to any political conviction, and quickly found he could not bear to live away from his beloved Germany. He returned to Germany in May 1939. He was accused by other exiled writers of having betrayed his principles.

After his return Glaeser labeled the émigrés as traitors, and swore an oath of allegiance to the Reich. He was given permission by the Propaganda Ministry to publish literary works under the pseudonym "Ernst Töpfer", subject to prior review and approval by the literature department. Joseph Goebbels hoped Glaeser would write a trilogy that would avow faith in the German Volk and would attack emigration. During World War II (1939–45) he edited Adler in Süden, a Luftwaffe newspaper distributed in North Africa and Italy. He made no progress on the novel of exile and return, and in January 1943 his permission to publish was withdrawn.

=== Last years ===
Glaeser tried to resume writing after the war, but did not produce any important works. His Glanz und Elend der Deutschen (1960) gives a depressing view of corruption and militarism in West Germany, but he also wrote a series of essays in which he praised West German politicians. Ernst Glaeser died on 8 February 1963 in Mainz.

== Work ==
- Überwindung der Madonna, Potsdam 1924
- Jahrgang 1902, Potsdam 1928
- Frieden 1919, Berlin 1930
- Der Staat ohne Arbeitslose, Berlin 1931 (with Franz Carl Weiskopf)
- Das Gut im Elsaß, Berlin 1932
- Die Apotheke am Neckar, Berlin 1933
- Der letzte Zivilist, Zürich 1935
- Das Unvergängliche, Amsterdam 1936
- Das Jahr, Zürich 1938
- Kreuzweg der Deutschen, Wiesbaden 1947
- Wider die Bürokratie, Kassel 1947
- Die deutsche Libertät, Kassel 1948
- Köpfe und Profile, Zürich 1952
- Das Kirschenfest, Zürich 1955
- Glanz und Elend der Deutschen, Munich 1960
- Die Lust zu gefallen, Wiesbaden 1960
- Die zerstörte Illusion, Munich 1960
- Auf daß unsere Kinder besser leben, Frankfurt 1961

== Sources ==
- Barbian, Jan-Pieter (2013-08-29). The Politics of Literature in Nazi Germany: Books in the Media Dictatorship. Bloomsbury Publishing. ISBN 978-1-4411-6814-6.
- Deák, István (1968). Weimar Germany's Left-wing Intellectuals: A Political History of the Weltbühne and Its Circle. University of California Press. GGKEY:B6ZRU3DDZYZ.
- "Ernst Glaeser". hjp-medien - Alemannenstraße - 64521 Groß-Gerau.
- Glaeser, Ernst; Kruse, Horst (1929). Class 1902. Univ of South Carolina Press. ISBN 978-1-57003-712-2.
- Palmier, Jean-Michel (2006). Weimar in Exile: The Antifascist Emigration in Europe and America. Verso. ISBN 978-1-84467-068-0.
