= Franz Hodjak =

German writer (1944–2025)

Franz Hodjak (27 September 1944 – 6 July 2025) was a German writer.

== Life and career ==
Franz Hodjak was born in Sibiu on 27 September 1944. He studied German and Romance languages and literature in Cluj and worked there as an editor at Dacia Publishing House from 1970 to 1992. In 1982, he received a scholarship to become Mannheim's town writer (which he was only allowed to take up after the fall of the Berlin Wall). In: Leipziger Literaturverlag, in 2002, he became Dresden's town writer. Franz Hodjak moved to Germany in 1992 and began teaching at the Frankfurt Poetry Lectureship in 1993. He received numerous scholarships, most recently in 2006 from the Hessian Ministry of Science and Research, Arts and Culture and in 2007 a scholarship at the Edenkoben Manor House. Hodjak wrote poetry and prose and translated from Romanian. Between 1970 and 1989, he published 20 books, including prose, poems, and children's books. Hodjak's poems have been translated into Romanian and Hungarian. Franz Hodjak lived in Usingen in the Taunus Mountains.

Hodjak died on 6 July 2025, at the age of 80.

== Works ==
- Fallow Land. Poems. Dacia Publishing House, Cluj 1970.
- Rooms for Play. Poems & Ideas. Kriterion, Bucharest 1974.
- Open Letters. Kriterion, Bucharest 1976.
- The Measure of Heads. Semi-fantastic texts. Kriterion, Bucharest 1978.
- The Humorous Cats. Children's Verses. Kriterion, Bucharest 1979.
- With Polly Knall, one talks about things one takes for granted as if they were self-evident. Kriterion, Bucharest 1979.
- Lilac in the Ear. Kriterion, Bucharest 1983.
- At a Corner Table. Kriterion, Bucharest 1984.
- The Dog Joho (children's book). Kriterion, Bucharest 1985.
- Sight. Kriterion, Bucharest 1986.
- Fridolin Hatches from the Egg (children's book). Kriterion, Bucharest 1986.
- Peaceful Circle. Prose. Kriterion, Bucharest 1987.
- change of air. Kriterion Verlag, Bucharest 1988.
- Longing for Fig Brandy. Aufbau-Verlag, Berlin/Weimar 1988.
- Transylvanian Speech Exercise. Suhrkamp Verlag, Frankfurt am Main 1990, ISBN 3-518-11622-3.
- Payday. Suhrkamp Verlag, Frankfurt am Main 1991, ISBN 3-518-40381-8.
- Franz, Story Collector. Suhrkamp Verlag, Frankfurt am Main 1992, ISBN 3-518-11698-3.
- Loss of Land. Suhrkamp Verlag, Frankfurt am Main 1993, ISBN 3-518-40548-9.
- Boundary Stones. Suhrkamp Verlag, Frankfurt am Main, 1995, ISBN 3-518-40688-4.
- Arrival Subjunctive. Suhrkamp Verlag, Frankfurt am Main, 1997, ISBN 3-518-40905-0.
- The Singers' Dispute. Suhrkamp Verlag, Frankfurt am Main, 2000, ISBN 3-518-41124-1.
- A Suitcase Full of Sand. Suhrkamp Verlag, Frankfurt am Main, 2003, ISBN 3-518-41394-5.
- The Fascination of a Day That Doesn't Exist. Ralf Liebe Verlag, Weilerswist, 2009, ISBN 978-3-941037-04-5.
- The One We Want to Be Is Already Taken. Aphorisms, Notes & an Essay. Afterword by Alexander Eilers. Verlag litblockin, Fernwald 2013, ISBN 978-3-923915-05-7.
- The thought of kidnapping me suggested itself. Poems. With lithographs by Hubertus Giebe. Typostudio Schumacher-Gebler, Dresden 2013, ISBN 978-3-941209-28-2.
- What never comes again. Poems. Stadtlichter Presse, Wenzendorf 2022, ISBN 978-3-947883-34-9.

== Awards ==
- 1982: City of Mannheim Writer's Scholarship
- 1990: Georg Maurer Prize Leipzig
- 1990: Prize of the State of Carinthia at the Ingeborg Bachmann Prize
- 1991: Literature Promotion Prize of the Cultural Circle of the Federation of German Industries (BDI)
- 1992: Honorary Award for the Andreas Gryphius Prize
- 1993: Frankfurt Poetry Lectures
- 1995: Minden Writer's Scholarship
- 1996: Nikolaus Lenau Prize of the Esslingen Artists' Guild
- 1997: Scholarship from the Heinrich Heine House of the City of Lüneburg
- 1998: Scholarship from the Calwer Hermann Hesse Foundation
- 2002: Dresden City Clerk
- 2005: Kester-Haeusler Award of Honor from the German Schiller Foundation
- 2013: Transylvanian Saxon Cultural Prize

== Literature ==
- Réka Sánta-Jakabházi: "Constructed Identities in the Work of Franz Hodjak." Peter Lang Publishing, Frankfurt am Main 2013, ISBN 978-3-631-63956-6.
- Walter Myß (ed.): "Encyclopedia of Transylvanian Saxons." Wort und Welt Publishing, Innsbruck 1993, ISBN 3-85373-140-6.
- Emmerich Reichrath (ed.): "Reflexes: Critical Contributions to Contemporary Romanian-German Literature." Kriterion, Bucharest 1977.
