= Werner Heiduczek =

German writer (1926–2019)

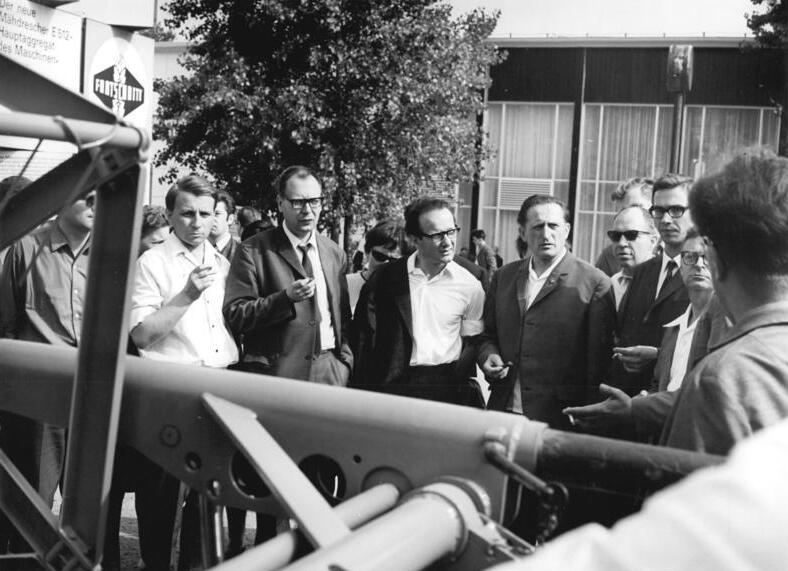
Writers at the "agra", Leipzig, 5 July 1968, from left to right: Werner Bräunig, Jochen Schäfers, Werner Heiduczek and Werner Reinowski.

Werner Heiduczek (24 November 1926 – 28 July 2019) was a German writer. His works have been translated into more than 20 languages and name as author – depending on the language region – Verner Gajduček, Verners Heidučeks or Verneris Heidućekas.

== Life ==
Born in Hindenburg, Upper Silesia, Heiduczek grew up in a Catholic Silesian miner family as one of five children – his father was a miner in the Upper Silesian coalfield. In 1942, during the Second World War, Heiduczek volunteered as an Luftwaffenhelfer. As he wanted to go to the front, the call-up to the Wehrmacht in 1944 was not inconvenient. However, he did not serve at the front.

He escaped from US captivity to the East Zone and there fell into Soviet custody, but he was spared the labour assignment in the Soviet Union. From January 1946, he took part in a course for so-called Neulehrer in Herzberg (Elster) and taught in the village school in Wehrhain from September to November 1946. From 1946 to 1949, Heiduczek studied education and German studies in Halle. Until 1952 he worked as a teacher, school inspector and finally Schulaufsicht in Merseburg. From 1953, he completed postgraduate studies in Potsdam in pedagogy and then worked in teaching again until 1961, for example 1955 to 1959 at the children's and youth sports school in Halle. From 1961 to 1964, he worked as a German teacher at the Goethe-Gymnasium Burgas, Bulgaria.

From 1965 he was a freelance writer based in Halle. Heiduczek initially wrote stories, plays and radio plays for children and young people. In later works, he dealt with the fate of Flight and expulsion of Germans (1944–1950) and their integration into the GDR society. His novel Death by the Sea, the autobiographically coloured, sceptical life balance of the GDR artist Jablonski, published in 1977 by Mitteldeutscher Verlag Halle/Saale, was temporarily banned in 1978 at the intervention of the Soviet ambassador to the GDR Peter Abrassimov because of alleged anti-Soviet passages: Heiduczek's book had addressed the rape of German women by Soviet soldiers after World War II. Until the end of the GDR, Heiduczek then increasingly shifted to material from fairy tales and legends.

Heiduczek had been a member of the Schriftstellerverband der DDR since 1960; since 1990 he belonged to the Verband deutscher Schriftstellerinnen und Schriftsteller and the PEN-Zentrum Deutschland, and since 1992 to the Freie Akademie der Künste zu Leipzig.

Heiduczek and his wife Dorothea (teacher, d. 1998) had three daughters (the youngest died in 1996). In 2001, the widower met the journalist Traudel Thalheim (born 1937) – with whom he lived in Leipzig until the end of his life. Heiduczek died in 2019 at the age of 92 in Zwenkau. The funeral service took place on 21 August 2019 in Leipzig; the urn was laid in the ground in Lichtentanne – at the grave site of his wife.

== Awards ==
- Heinrich Mann Prize 1969
- Handel Prize, city of Halle 1969
- Kunstpreis der Stadt Leipzig 1970
- Alex Wedding Prize 1988
- Eichendorff-Literaturpreis, city of Wangen im Allgäu 1995
- Ehrenmedaille der Stadt Leipzig 1997
- Order of Merit of the Federal Republic of Germany 1999.

The city of Leipzig honoured him in 1996 with the honorary volume "Werner Heiduczek zum 70. Geburtstag" (responsible: Reinhard Stridde, essay: Carsten Wurm, bibliography: Ulrich Kiehl), ISBN 3-86061-012-0.

== Work ==
=== As author ===
Die Deutsche Nationalbibliothek listet zum Autor Werner Heiduczek insgesamt 119 Publikationen auf (Stand: 29. Juli 2019).

Autobiography

- Die Schatten meiner Toten. Verlag Faber and Faber, Leipzig 2005, ISBN 978-3-86211-014-8.

Picture books

- Jana und der kleine Stern. Eine Bilderbuchgeschichte. LeiV, Leipzig 1994, ISBN 3-928885-67-7 (EA Berlin 1968).
- Laterne vor der Bambushütte. Kinderbuchverlag, Berlin 1969.
- Der kleine häßliche Vogel. Zwei Bilderbucherzählungen. Faber & Faber, Leipzig 2006, ISBN 978-3-86730-006-3 (EA Berlin 1973).
- Vom Hahn, der auszog, Hofmarschall zu werden. Arena-Verlag, Würzburg 1996, ISBN 3-401-07210-2 (EA Berlin 1975).
- Der singende Fisch. Kinderbuchverlag, Berlin 2000, ISBN 3-358-02235-8 (together with Jutta Mirtschin)

Tales, fairy tales

- Matthes und der Bürgermeister. Mitteldeutscher Verlag, Halle/Saale 1961
- Die Brüder. 5th edition. Kinderbuchverlag, Berlin 1976 (EA Berlin 1968)
- Mark Aurel oder Ein Semester Zärtlichkeit. Verlag Neues Leben, Berlin 1988, ISBN 3-355-00791-9 (EA Berlin 1971).
- Jule findet Freunde. Erzählungen (Robinsons billige Bücher; Vol. 41). Kinderbuchverlag, Berlin 1961.
- Das verschenkte Weinen. Märchen und Mythen. Kiepenheuer Verlag, Leipzig 1991, ISBN 3-378-00471-1 (EA Berlin 1977).
- Dulittls wundersame Reise. Eine Erzählung. Kinderbuchverlag, Berlin 1986, ISBN 3-358-00734-0.
- Reise nach Beirut. Verfehlung. Mitteldeutscher Verlag, Halle/Saale 1986, ISBN 3-354-00040-6.

Essays

- Verfall einer Zeit. Beispiel Leipzig. Weidlich Flechsig, Würzburg 1992, ISBN 3-8035-1353-7 (together with Gerhard Hopf and Falk Brunner).
- Deutschland – kein Wintermärchen oder Draußen vor der Tür. Verlag Europäische Ideen, Berlin 1993.
- Jeder ist sich selbst der Fernste. Plöttner, Leipzig 2010, ISBN 978-3-95537-039-8.
- Vom Glanz und Elend des Schreibens. Plöttner, Leipzig 2011, ISBN 978-3-95537-038-1.

Children's books

- Matthes. 6th edition Kinderbuchverlag, Berlin 1979 (EA Berlin 1962)
- Der kleine Gott der Diebe. LeiV, Leipzig 1992, ISBN 3-928885-20-0.

Recounts

- Die seltsamen Abenteuer des Parzival. Fischer Taschenbuchverlag, Frankfurt, 1989, ISBN 3-596-28308-6 (EA Berlin 1974; freely adapted from Wolfram von Eschenbach).
- Die schönsten Sagen aus Firdausi's "Shahnameh". 4th edition Kinderbuchverlag, Berlin 1989, ISBN 3-358-01413-4 (EA Berlin 1982).
- Der Schatten des Sijawusch. Mitteldeutscher Verlag, Halle/Saale und Leipzig 1986.
- Orpheus und Eurydike. Kinderbuchverlag, Berlin 1989, ISBN 3-358-01288-3.
- King Lear. Sonnenberg-Presse, Chemnitz 2000 (together with Andrea Lange).

Novels

- Abschied von den Engeln. 9th edition Mitteldeutscher Verlag, Halle/Saale 1968.
- Tod am Meer. Aufbau-Taschenbuchverlag, Berlin 1999, ISBN 3-7466-1584-4 (EA Halle/Saale 1977).

Theater plays

- Jule findet Freunde. Schauspiel in zehn Bildern. Hofmeister Verlag, Leipzig 1959.
- Der Gast aus Saadulla (premiere 1985 Schauspiel Leipzig)
- Das andere Gesicht. Schauspiel by Werner Heiduczek. Plöttner, Leipzig 2011, ISBN 978-3-86211-050-6

Werkausgabe

- Im Querschnitt. Prosa, Stücke, Notate. Mitteldeutscher Verlag, Halle/Saale 1976.
- Im gewöhnlichen Stalinism. Meine unerlaubten Texte, Tagebücher, Briefe, Essays. Kiepenheuer Verlag, Leipzig 1991, ISBN 3-378-00453-3.

=== As publisher ===
- Die sanfte Revolution. Prosa, Lyrik, Protokolle, Erlebnisberichte, Reden. Kiepenheuer, Leipzig 1990, ISBN 3-378-00421-5 (together with Stefan Heym).
