= Franz Carl Weiskopf =

Austrian-Hungarian writer

Weiskopf in May 1955

Franz Carl Weiskopf (3 April 1900 in Prague – 14 September 1955) was a German-speaking writer. Born in Prague, then part of Austria-Hungary, he was often referred to as F. C. Weiskopf, he also used the pseudonyms Petr Buk, Pierre Buk and F. W. L. Kovacs. He died in Berlin in 1955.

== Life ==
Weiskopf was the son of a German banker who was Jewish and a Czech mother. He studied at a German school in Prague and then went to university in his hometown to study Germanistik and history from 1919 to 1923. He traveled to the Soviet Union in 1926 Two years later he moved to Berlin where he became editor of the Berlin am Morgen newspaper. He was a member in good standing of the Confederation of Proletarian Revolutionary Writers (German: Bund proletarisch-revolutionärer Schriftsteller) and participated in a conference in 1930 with Anna Seghers in Charkow in the Soviet Union.

He married the writer Grete Bernheim.

After the takeover by the Nazis in 1933 Weiskopf returned to Prague, where he was editor of the Arbeiter-Illustrierte-Zeitung. When the newspaper was forced to shut down in October 1938, Weiskopf left for Paris. From there, he traveled to the United States in April 1939, with the help of the League of American Writers. He survived the war in New York.

After the end of the war, Weiskopf was in the diplomatic service of Czechoslovakia and worked, first at an Embassy in Washington DC, 1949 to 1950 as ambassador to Stockholm, and from 1950 to 1952 as ambassador to Beijing. In 1952 he returned to Prague, but moved in 1953 to East Berlin. In the last years of his life he was a board member of the Deutscher Schriftstellerverband, and published the magazine New German Literature (German: Neue Deutsche Literatur) together with Willi Bredel and became member of PEN.

F.C. Weiskopf wrote novels, short stories, stories, anecdotes, poetry and essays. His work was always realistic, stylistically far above the average for other authors of the Socialist realism. His narrative works were mostly set in the middle of Czechoslovakia and describe the path of solidarity of citizens and workers since the First World War.

His wife initiated a Weiskopf named Prize, which has been awarded since 1956 for contribution to the preservation of the German language. In 2024, the prize was merged with his wife's own prize (the Alex Wedding Prize).

F.C. Weiskopf and his wife are buried in Berlin's Friedrichsfelde Cemetery.

== Works ==
Weiskopf's works include:

- Es geht eine Trommel, Berlin-Schöneberg 1923
- Die Flucht nach Frankreich, Wien [u. a.] 1926
- Umsteigen ins 21. Jahrhundert, Berlin 1927
- Wer keine Wahl hat, hat die Qual, Berlin 1928
- Der Traum des Friseurs Cimbura, Berlin 1930
- Der Staat ohne Arbeitslose, Berlin 1931 (zusammen mit Ernst Glaeser und Alfred Kurella)
- Das Slawenlied, Berlin 1931
- Zukunft im Rohbau, Berlin 1932
- Die Stärkeren, Moskau [u. a.] 1934
- Die Versuchung, Zürich 1937
- La tragédie tchécoslavaque, Paris 1939 (unter dem Namen Pierre Buk)
- The untamed Balkans, New York 1941 (unter dem Namen Frederic W. L. Kovacs)
- Vor einem neuen Tag, Mexico 1944
- Himmelfahrts-Kommando, Stockholm 1945
- Die Unbesiegbaren, New York 1945
- Unter fremden Himmeln, Berlin 1948
- Abschied vom Frieden, Berlin 1950
- Elend und Größe unserer Tage, Berlin 1950
- Der ferne Klang, Berlin 1950
- Menschen, Städte und Jahre, Wien 1950
- Kinder ihrer Zeit, Berlin 1951
- Die Reise nach Kanton, Berlin 1953
- Das Anekdotenbuch, Berlin 1954
- Aus allen vier Winden, Berlin 1954
- Verteidigung der deutschen Sprache, Berlin 1955
- Literarische Streifzüge, Berlin 1956
- Gesammelte Werke, Berlin
  - Bd. 1. Abschied vom Frieden, 1960 (bereits 1950 im Dietz Verlag erschienen)
  - Bd. 2. Inmitten des Stroms. Welt in Wehen, 1960
  - Bd. 3. Das Slawenlied. Vor einem neuen Tag, 1960
  - Bd. 4. Lissy. Himmelfahrtskommando, 1960
  - Bd. 5. Gedichte und Nachdichtungen, 1960
  - Bd. 6. Anekdoten und Erzählungen, 1960
  - Bd. 7. Reportagen, 1960
  - Bd. 8. Über Literatur und Sprache. Verteidigung der deutschen Sprache, 1960
- Briefwechsel 1942 - 1948, Berlin [u. a.] 1990 (mit Bodo Uhse)

== Editorials ==
- Januartage, Prag-Karlin 1926
- Denise Leblond-Zola: Zola, Berlin 1932
- Hundred towers, New York 1945
- Kisch-Kalender, Berlin 1955

== Translations ==
- Tschechische Lieder, Berlin 1925
- Das Herz - ein Schild, London 1937
- Gesang der gelben Erde, Berlin 1951
- Chien Tien: Des Tien Tschien Lied vom Karren, Berlin 1953
- Max Švabinský: Schmetterlingszeit, Prag 1954

== Films ==
- 1957: Lissy - Director: Konrad Wolf
- 1977: Abschied vom Frieden - Director: Hans-Joachim Kasprzik
