= Hans-Jürgen Heise =

German author and poet

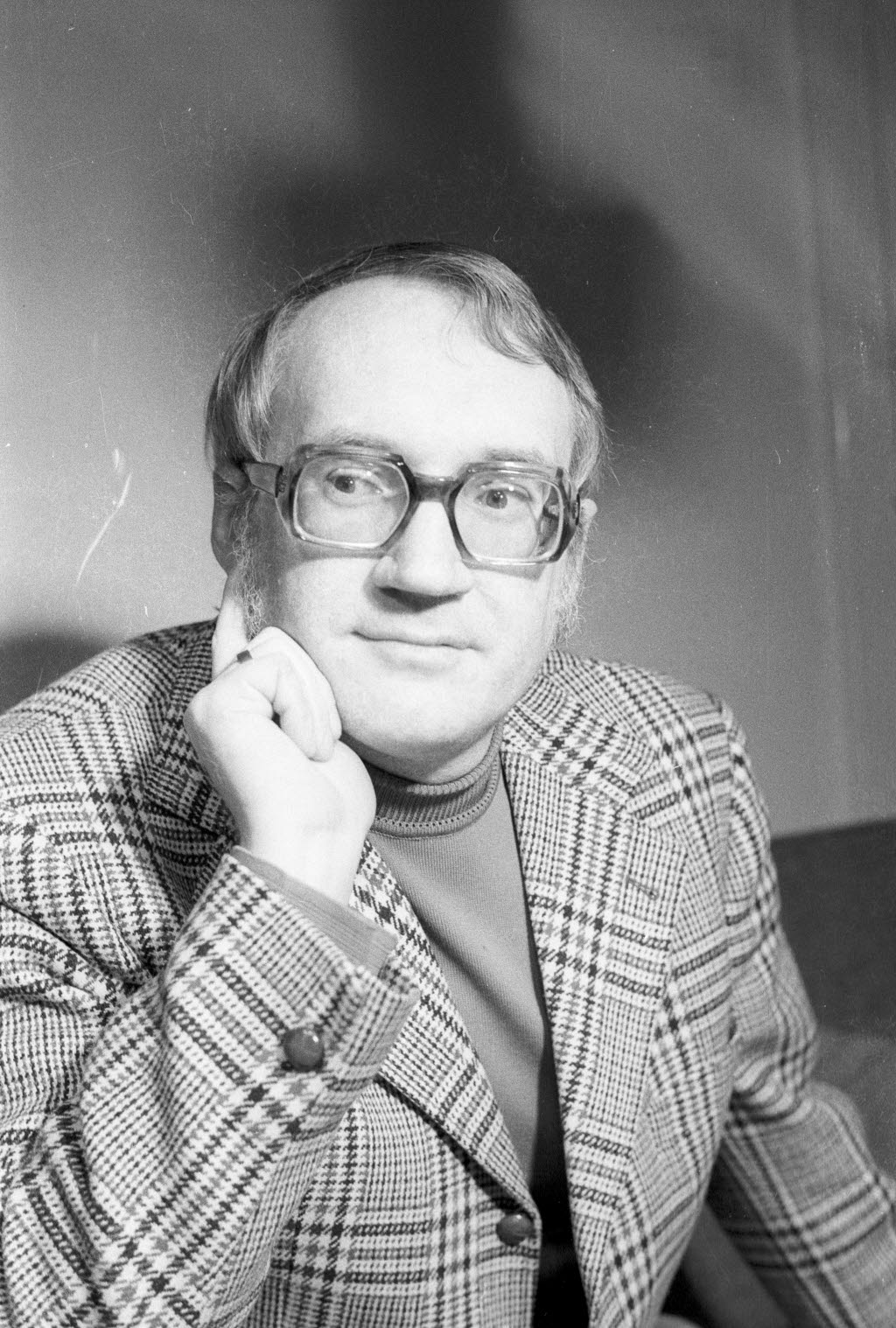
Hans-Jürgen Heise

Hans-Jürgen Heise (6 July 1930 – 13 November 2013) was a German author and poet.

== Biography ==
Heise was born Hans-Jürgen Scheller in Bublitz, Pomerania, Weimar Germany (modern Bobolice, Poland). His family moved to Berlin when he was still an infant but returned to Bublitz because of the Allied bombing of Berlin in World War II.

In 1945 Heise's family fled from Pomerania. Heise started to work as a journalist in Berlin and later became a lector at the University of Kiel.

Hans-Jürgen Heise died in Kiel.

== Publications ==
- Vorboten einer neuen Steppe, 1961
- Wegloser Traum, 1964
- Worte aus der Zentrifuge, 1966
- Ein bewohnbares Haus, 1968
- Küstenwind, 1969
- Uhrenvergleich, 1971
- Underseas Possessions, 1972
- Das Profil unter der Maske (Essays), 1974
- Meine kleine Freundin Schizophrenia, 1981
- Bilder und Klänge aus al-Andalus. Höhepunkte spanischer Literatur und Kunst. (Essays), 1986
- Der Macho und der Kampfhahn. Unterwegs in Spanien und Lateinamerika. (Reisebericht), 1987
- Die zweite Entdeckung Amerikas. Annäherungen an die Literatur des lateinamerikanischen Subkontinents (Essays), 1987
- Ein Galgen für den Dichter. Stichworte zur Lyrik (Essays), 1990
- Katzen fallen auf die Beine (Kurzprosa), 1993
- Zwischenhoch, 1997
- Ein Fax von Basho, 2000
- Wenn das Blech als Trompete aufwacht. Schlüsselfiguren der Moderne (Essays), 2000
- Die Zeit kriegt Zifferblatt und Zeiger. Autobiografische Stationen und ein verschattetes Reiseziel, 2003
- Das Zyklopenauge der Vernunft, 2005

== Awards ==
- Andreas Gryphius Prize, 1973
- Kulturpreis of the City of Kiel, 1974
- Malta Cultural Award, 1976)
- "kultur aktuell", 1988
- honorary guest of the Villa Massimo, 1989
- Pomeranian Culture Award, 1993
- Andreas Gryphius Prize, 1994
- Kunstpreis of the land of Schleswig-Holstein, 2002
