= Gerhard Schedl =

Austrian composer

Gerhard Schedl (5 August 1957 – 30 November 2000) was an Austrian composer. His works included chamber works, operas, theater pieces, symphonies, concertos, and sonatas.

== Early life and education ==
Schedl was born in Vienna and began composing during his childhood. In 1976 he began his professional studies with Erich Urbanner at the University of Music and Performing Arts, Vienna. He graduated with distinction in 1980.

== Career ==
For nearly 20 years, Schedl taught at the Hoch Conservatory in Frankfurt.

Schedl had early success with his music dramatic works including his oratorio Der Großinquisitor (The Grand Inquisitor) and his opera for children Der Schweinehirt (The Swineherd).

Schedl also composed chamber music and symphonic works. His compositions were played by musicians, ensembles and orchestras such as David Geringas, Dennis Russell Davies, the ORF Symphony Orchestra and the Ensemble Modern.

== Personal life and death ==
After a long period of severe depression, Schedl shot himself in the woods near his home in Eppstein. He was buried in an honorary grave at the central cemetery of Vienna, group 40 No. 97.

== Gerhard Schedl Prize ==
In 2009 the Neue Oper Wien created a composition competition for a feature-length music-dramatic work.

== Works ==
Stage

- Der Großinquisitor (The Grand Inquisitor), Scenic Oratorio for bass-baritone, cello, narrator, chorus, organ and orchestra (1979–1980)
- Der Schweinehirt, Children's Opera (1980); libretto after the fairy tale The Swineherd by Hans Christian Andersen
- Triptychon, Chamber Opera Trilogy (1982–1989)

1. Pierre et Luce, Lyric Chamber Opera in 7 Scenes with Introduction for soprano, tenor and chamber ensemble (1989); libretto by Attila Bőcs
2. Kontrabass, Chamber Opera in 1 act for soprano, tenor, baritone, 6 cellos, double bass and percussion (1982); libretto by Attila Bőcs after a story by Siegfried Pietschmann
3. S.C.H.A.S., Skurriles Musiktheater (Bizarre Musical Theater) (1986); libretto after Hans Carl Artmann

- Schall und Rauch oder Das Leben ist hart genug, 3 Parodies for actor and chamber ensemble (clarinet, bassoon, trumpet, trombone, violin, double bass, piano) (1983)
- Glaube Liebe Hoffnung, Oper (1991–1992); libretto based on templates provided by Ödön von Horváth
- ... fremd bin ich eingezogen ..., Dance and Musical Theatre Piece for dancers, singers, actors, electronic bands, chorus and orchestra (1995)
- Der Ficus spricht, Minidrama (Farce) in 1 act (1998); libretto by Franzobel
- Riesen, Zwerge, Menschenfresser, Youth Opera (1998); libretto by Herbert Vogg after Oscar Wilde's The Selfish Giant
- Julie & Jean, Ein Match in zwölf Runden nach Motiven von August Strindbergs for soprano, baritone, chorus and orchestra (1999); libretto by Bernhard Glocksin after August Strindberg's Miss Julie

Orchestral

- Drei Miniaturen (3 Miniatures) (1980)
- Tango (1981)
- Symphony No. 1 (1982)
- Kontrapunkt IV (1984)
- Symphony No. 2 "Fleurs du Mal" (1987)
- Figures in the Dark for big band (1988)
- Symphony No. 3 for baritone and orchestra (1990); words by Friedrich Hölderlin
- Concerto da Camera for chamber ensemble (1991)
- 5 Intermezzi from the opera Glaube Liebe Hoffnung (1995)
- Symphony No. 4 "Belfast" (2000); fragment

Concertante

- Capriccio for piano and small orchestra (1977)
- Concerto for violin and 9 stringed instruments (1979)
- Concerto for guitar and jazz ensemble (tenor saxophone, trombone, double bass, drums, piano) (1983)
- Double Concerto for violin, cello, 10 stringed instruments and harpsichord (1987); after Sinfonia 9 f-moll, BWV 795 by Johann Sebastian Bach
- Concerto for viola and orchestra (1988)
- Concerto for violin and orchestra (1995)
- Slow, Music for cello and orchestra (1997)
- short cuts, Concertino for clarinet and chamber ensemble (2000)

Chamber music

- Sonata for cello solo, Op. 1 (1975)
- Concertino for viola and piano (1976)
- Fantasie über einen ostinaten Baß (Fantasie on an Ostinato Bass) for guitar solo, Op. 12 (1976)
- Musik for clarinet, tuba (or double bass) and piano (1977)
- Nächtliche Szenen (Nocturnal Scenes), Sketches for a string quartet (1977)
- Rhythmen (Rhythms), Dances for guitar solo, Op. 7 (1980)
- Der Totentanz von Anno Neun, Septet for flute, oboe, clarinet, bass clarinet, violin, cello and double bass, Op. 14 (1980); after painting by Albin Egger-Lienz
- Sonata for flute solo (1981)
- Nachtstück (Nocturne) for wind quintet (1982)
- Gesänge über "Deh vieni alla finestra" for violin, cello and piano, Op. 4 (1983); after the canzonetta from the opera Don Giovanni by Wolfgang Amadeus Mozart
- Rondeau for guitar solo (1983)
- a tre, Variations for clarinet, violin and piano (1984)
- Schattenbilder, 4 Movements for cello and piano (1985)
- String Quartet Romantische Paraphrase über "Der Tod und das Mädchen" (1986); paraphrase on Death and the Maiden by Franz Schubert
- Melodram: ein elegischer Gesang for baritone saxophone and percussion (1989)
- Quasi una Fantasia for lute solo (1990)
- Zwei Stücke aus der "Schatz-Truhe" (2 Pieces from the "Schatz-Truhe") for cello solo (1990)
- Der, welcher wandert diese Straße voll Beschwerden, Lamento for violin, cello and piano (1991); after The Magic Flute by Wolfgang Amadeus Mozart
- String Trio (1991)
- Divertimento for 2 violins and double bass (1992)
- Sonata da camera for saxophone quartet (1994)
- a cinque for clarinet, violin, viola, cello and piano (1996–1997)
- String Quartet No. 3 (1996)
- Concertino for violin and piano (1998)
- a due for violin and cello (2000)

Organ

- Passacaglia (1982)
- action-meditation, Aleatoric Improvisation (1983)

Piano

- Zwei lyrische Stücke (2 Lyric Pieces), Op. 17 (1979)
- Zwölf Impressionen nach einem Landschaftszyklus von Ulrich Doege (12 Impressions after a Landscape Cycle of Ulrich Doege), Op. 19 (1980)
- Variationen über einen Walzer (Variations on a Waltz) (1981)
- Préludes (1984)

Vocal

- Der Panther for voice and piano; words by Rainer Maria Rilke
- ... so zu Licht und Lust geboren ..., Poetry for baritone and orchestra (1986)
- Concerto da Camera II for high voice and chamber ensemble (1994); words by Verena Blecher

Choral

- Zaubersprüche for mixed chorus, percussion and double bass, Op. 16 (1981)
- Magnificat for mixed chorus a cappella (1982)
- Pater noster – in der phrygischen Tonart for 16 voices a cappella (1983)
- Te Deum for soprano, alto, tenor, bass, mixed chorus, organ and orchestra (1984–1985)
- Böse Sprüche, Farce for chamber chorus, alto saxophone, trumpet and trombone (1988); libretto after "Trara Trara die Hochkultur" by Fritz Hermann

== Students ==
Students of Gerhard Schedl have included Klaus Wiede, Stefan Thomas, Dieter Hermsdorf and Daniel Hensel, who wrote the first musicological study and dissertation on the music of Gerhard Schedl.

== Literature ==
- Daniel Hensel: Von der Einheit in der Vielfalt oder der Lust am Subjektiven: Die Musik Gerhard Schedls, dargestellt an seiner Instrumentalmusik, Stuttgart: ibidem 2011, ISBN 978-3-8382-0278-5
