= Kerstin Preiwuß =

German writer

- Born: 21 November 1980 (age 45); Lübz
- Education: University of Leipzig; German Institute for Literature
- Occupations: Writer, poet, literary critic, professor
- Writing career
- Genre: Poetry

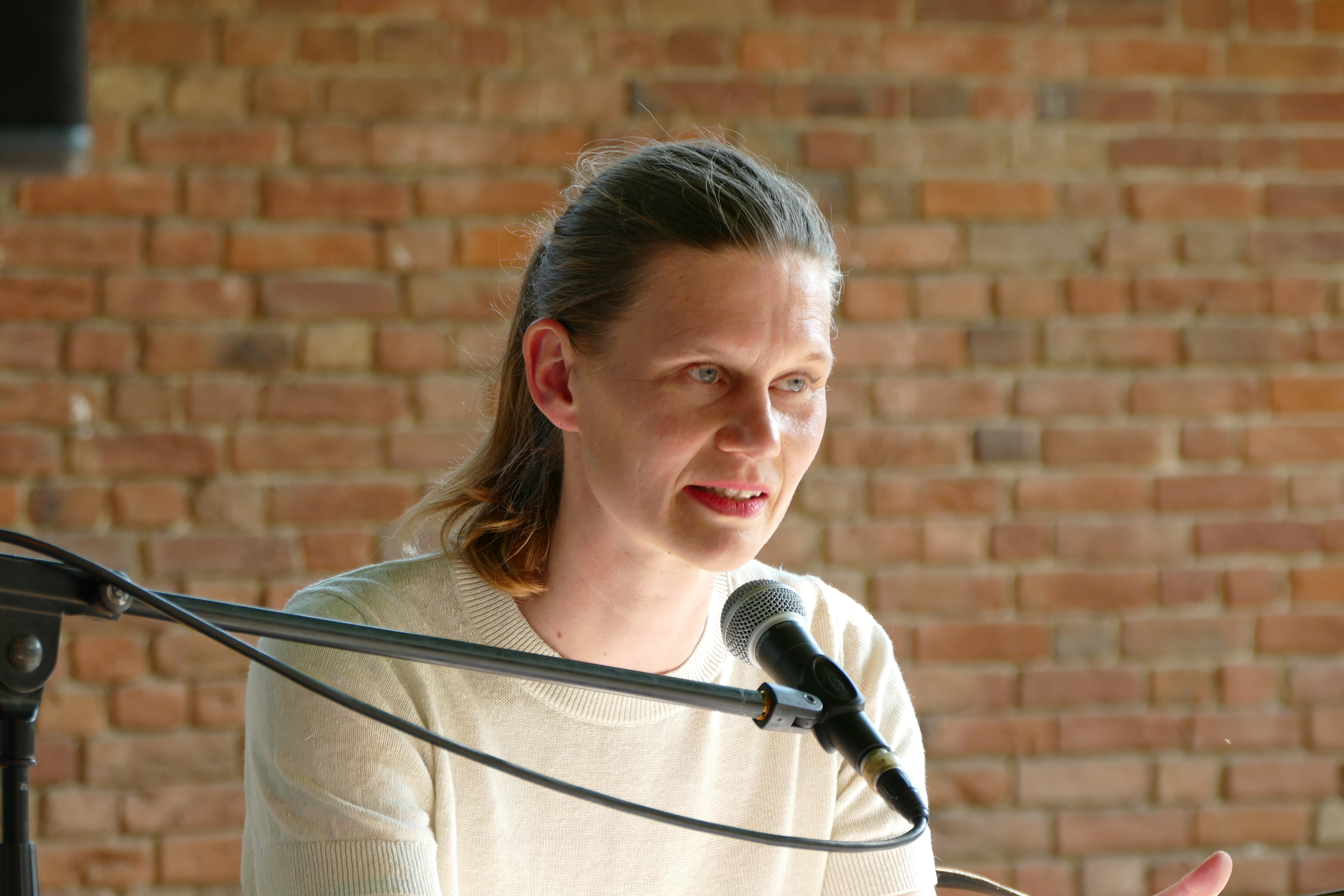
Kerstin Preiwuß at the Poetry Festival Berlin in 2023

Kerstin Preiwuß (born 21 November 1980 in Lübz, Germany) is a German writer and arts journalist.

== Life and work ==
Preiwuß was raised in Plau am See and in Rostock. She studied German studies, philosophy and psychology in Leipzig and Aix-en-Provence. Her doctoral thesis dealt with German-Polish toponyms. Preiwuß also holds a degree from the German Institute for Literature where she currently teaches alongside Ulrike Draesner and Michael Lentz as a professor and acts as head of the institute. Between 2010 and 2012, she was co-editor of the Leipzig based literary magazine Edit where she published literature rewiews.

Mainly, Preiwuß writes poetry and novels. For her work she has received numerous awards. She also translates poetry, teaches creative writing and is a visiting lecturer at different universities.

She is a member of the PEN Centre Germany and of the Deutsche Akademie für Sprache und Dichtung.

Preiwuß lives with her family in Leipzig.

== Critical reception ==
The poetry collection Rede (speech) has received a recommendation by Monika Rinck in the context of the poetry recommendations of the Deutsche Akademie für Sprache und Dichtung, the foundation Lyrik Kabinett Munich and the Haus für Poesie (House for Poetry) Berlin in 2013.

== Honours ==
- 2008 Hermann Lenz scholarship
- 2009 Art residency at the Künstlerhaus Lukas in Reykjavík
- 2010 Scholarship of the Deutscher Literaturfonds
- 2012 Mondsee Poetry Prize
- 2014 Invitation by Meike Feßmann to the 38th Festival of German-Language Literature
- 2017 Nominated for the German Book Prize for Nach Onkalo (After Onkalo) (Longlist)
- 2018 Merano Poetry Prize
- 2018 Eichendorff Literature Prize
- 2020 Anke Bennholdt-Thomsen Poetry Prize of the Deutsche Schillerstiftung

== Publications ==
- Nachricht von neuen Sternen. Gedichte, Connewitzer Verlagsbuchhandlung, Leipzig 2006, ISBN 3-937799-21-4
- Rede. Gedichte, Suhrkamp, Berlin 2012, ISBN 978-3-518-12648-6
- Ortsnamen in Zeit, Raum und Kultur – die Städte Allenstein/Olsztyn und Breslau/Wrocław. Frank & Timme, Berlin 2012, ISBN 978-3-86596-368-0
- Restwärme. Roman, Berlin Verlag, Berlin 2014, ISBN 978-3-8270-1231-9
- Gespür für Licht. Gedichte, Berlin Verlag, Berlin 2016, ISBN 978-3-8270-1301-9
- Nach Onkalo. Roman, Berlin Verlag, Berlin 2017, ISBN 978-3-827013-14-9
- Das Komma und das Und. Eine Liebeserklärung an die Sprache. Dudenverlag, Berlin 2019, ISBN 978-3-411748-42-6
- Taupunkt. Gedichte, Berlin Verlag, Berlin 2020, ISBN 978-3-8270-1410-8
- Heute ist mitten in der Nacht, Berlin Verlag, Berlin 2023, ISBN 978-3-8270-1465-8
