= Milo Dor =

Serbian Austrian writer and translator (1923–2005)

- Born: Milutin Doroslovac; 7 March 1923; Budapest, Hungary
- Died: 5 December 2005 (aged 82); Vienna, Austria
- Writing career
- Pen name: Alex Lutin, Alexander Dormann
- Notable work: The Raikow Saga

Milo Dor (7 March 1923 – December 2005) was a Serbian Austrian writer and translator. He described himself as "an Austrian, Viennese, and European of Serbian heritage."

== Life ==
Milo Dor was born in to a Serbian family in Budapest, as Milutin Doroslovac. His father was a surgeon, his mother lead a beauty salon. Dor grew up in the Banat and later in Belgrade. In highschool, he was a member of the Communist Youth and wrote lyrics. Having organised a school strike in 1940, he was expelled. Nevertheless, he passed his final exams in the following year. He participated in the resistance movement against the German occupants. In 1942, he was arrested; stays in prison and camps followed until he was deported to Vienna in 1943. A year later, he was arrested again and put into "protective custody" (a euphemism used by the Nazis for the rounding-up of political opponents).

After World War II, Dor stayed in Austria, studying drama and Romance languages at the University of Vienna until 1949 while working as a German writing journalist. From 1951, he was a member of the literary association Group 47. He was also a member of the Austrian PEN Club and president of the Austrian Writers Federation. Dor lived in Vienna and at times in Rovinj with his second wife, with whom he had been married since 1955, until her death in 2002. His son is the Austrian film-maker Milan Dor.

Milo Dor died early on 5 December 2005 from heart failure in a hospital in Vienna and was interred in an honorary grave at the Zentralfriedhof.

== Works ==
My forefathers took themselves for Serbs because they had fled from the Turks to Austria, three hundred years ago, together with other people taking themselves for Serbs. So they became Austrians. My mother's father married a Greek woman... They communicated in German. When I dug further, I found out that my forefathers' forefathers were Thracians... The more I think about it, the more I feel as a Thracian.

— Milo Dor, Ein Fremder unter lauter Ausländern

Milo Dor wrote historical novels dealing with Yugoslavian and European history, essays criticising nationalism in Yugoslavia, crime fiction, news coverages, screenplays and radio dramas, edited documentaries and anthologies and translated Serbo-Croatian literature into German. Authors he translated include Ivo Andrić, Isaak Babel, Bogdan Bogdanović, Stephen Crane, Dušan Kovačević, Miroslav Krleža, Branislav Nušić, Vasko Popa, Georges Simenon, Stanislav Vinaver, and Milovan Vitezović. Beginning in the 1950s, he wrote numerous books in cooperation with Reinhard Federmann.

Dor's best known work is The Raikow Saga, a trilogy consisting of Tote auf Urlaub [Dead men on leave], Nichts als Erinnerung [Nothing but memories], and Die weiße Stadt [The white town]. The hero of these novels is the autobiographically coloured figure Mladen Raikow.

The following of his books are available in English:

- Dead men on leave: a novel of the Yugoslav Resistance. London: Barrie and Rockliff. 1962. ASIN B000GVXREE.
- On the wrong track: fragments of an autobiography. Riverside, California: Ariadne Press. 1993. ISBN 0-929497-66-X.
- International zone. Riverside, California: Ariadne Press. 1999. ISBN 1-57241-076-0.

== Awards ==
- Austrian state award for literature (1962)
- Anton Wildgans Prize (1972)
- Literary award of Vienna (1977)
- Austrian Prize for Literature (1980)
- Austrian Cross of Honour for Science and Art, 1st class (1983)
- Honorary Gold Medal of Vienna (1988)
- Austrian State Prize for services to the Austrian culture abroad (1989)
- Honorary Award of the Austrian book trade for tolerance in thought and action (1990)
- Andreas Gryphius Prize (1998)
- Bruno Kreisky Prize for the Political Book (2001)
- Grand Decoration of Honour in Silver for Services to the Republic of Austria (2003)
- Gold Medal for Meritorious Service to the Province of Vienna (2004)
- Theodor Kramer Prize (2006, posthumous)
- Member of the Austrian PEN Club and long-time president of the Professional Association of Austrian writers.

== See also ==
- List of Austrian writers
