= Jörg Bernig =

German poet and essayist

- Born: Jörg Heinz Bernig; 17 January 1964; Wurzen, Saxony, Germany
- Education: Leipzig University (MA); FU Berlin (PhD)
- Occupations: Poet, writer
- Writing career
- Language: German
- Notable awards: 2000 Friedrich-Hölderlin-Prize from the city of Bad Homburg v.d.H. 2002 Writer in Residence, University of Aberdeen, Scotland 2005 sponsorship award for the Lessing Prize of the Free State of Saxony 2005 Sudeten German Culture Prize for literature 2011 Eichendorff Literature Prize 2018 Poet in Residence, Dresden 2022 Andreas Gryphius Prize

Jörg Heinz Bernig (born 17 January 1964) is a German poet, novelist and essayist.

== Biography ==
Jörg Bernig is a descendant of Sudeten German refugees. He studied at the University of Leipzig from 1985 to 1990 (German and English) after completing his apprenticeship as a miner and in the military of the GDR. He then lived in the UK for some time, where he taught at the University of Wales, Swansea. In 1996 he received his doctorate from the Freie Universität Berlin with a thesis on German war literature. Years of activity in research projects at the Technical University of Dresden followed. In 2020, the city council of Radebeul elected him head of the cultural department in a secret ballot. An ideological campaign forced the mayor to repeat the election, for which Jörg Bernig, who was democratically elected, did not make himself available. "What to say - Explanation by Jörg Bernig"(GERMAN). Jörg Bernig has been publishing poems, novels, short prose and essays since the late 1990s. He is a member of the Bavarian, Saxon and Sudeten German Art Academies as well as the PEN Center Germany. His literary work has received awards including the Eichendorff Literature Prize and the Andreas Gryphius Prize. Jörg Bernig lives near Dresden, in Radebeul.

== Bibliography ==
(German)

- Winterkinder. Gedichte. Verlag Die Scheune: Dresden 1998. ISBN 978-3-931684-16-7
- Dahinter die Stille. Roman. Deutsche Verlags-Anstalt: Stuttgart 1999. ISBN 978-3-421-05215-5
- Niemandszeit. Roman. Deutsche Verlags-Anstalt: Stuttgart München 2002. ISBN 978-3-9822049-3-2
- billett zu den göttern. Gedichte. Edition Toni Pongratz: Hauzenberg 2002. ISBN 978-3-931883-22-5
- Die ersten Tage. Erzählung. Edition Toni Pongratz: Hauzenberg 2007. ISBN 978-3-931883-61-4
- Weder Ebbe noch Flut. Roman. Mitteldeutscher Verlag: Halle 2007, edition buchhaus loschwitz, Dresden 2012. ISBN 978-3-9820131-2-1
- wüten gegen die stunden. Gedichte. Mitteldeutscher Verlag: Halle 2009. ISBN 978-3-89812-604-5
- Der Gablonzer Glasknopf. Essays aus Mitteleuropa. Thelem Verlag: Dresden 2011. ISBN 978-3-942411-47-9
- Anders. Roman. Mitteldeutscher Verlag: Halle 2014. ISBN 978-3-95462-313-6
- »Habe Mut …‹‹ Essay. Forschungsstelle für Lessingrezeption: Kamenz 2016. ISBN 978-3-9817103-3-5
- in untergegangenen reichen. Gedichte. Edition Rugerup: Berlin 2017.
- reise reise. Gedichte. edition buchhaus loschwitz: Dresden 2018. ISBN 978-3-9816210-9-9
- An der Allerweltsecke. Essays. edition buchhaus loschwitz: Dresden 2020. ISBN 978-3-9820131-7-6
- Der Wehrläufer. Eine Geschichte aus Prag. Novelle. edition buchhaus loschwitz: Dresden 2021. ISBN 978-3-9823005-0-4
- Eschenhaus. Roman. edition buchhaus loschwitz: Dresden 2023. ISBN 978-3-9824237-9-1
- inseln gesehn. Gedichte. edition buchhaus loschwitz: Dresden 2025. ISBN 978-3-9826512-0-0.

(translated)

- No Man's Time, originally published as "Niemandszeit" by Deutsche Verlagsanstalt in 2002, English translation by Steven W. Lawrie, CreateSpace Independent Publishing Platform, Aberdeen 2004. ISBN 978-1499717853
- flower angel ship. Selected Poems (Boiled String Poetry Chapbooks, Band 8), Hafan Books, Swansea 2013. ISBN 978-0-9926564-0-9
- Čas Nikoho (Czech), originally published as "Niemandszeit" by Deutsche Verlagsanstalt in 2002, Czech translation by Jana Kudělková, Mladá fronta, Prague 2005. ISBN 80-204-1244-1
- Ziemia niczyja, bezpański czas. Opowieść sudecka, originally published as "Niemandszeit" by Deutsche Verlagsanstalt in 2002, Polish translation, Małgorzata Słabicka, Via Nova, Wrocław 2015. ISBN 978-8364025181
- Solilokutor. Wiersze wybrane (Polish), originally published as wüten gegen die stunden mitteldeutscher verlag, Halle/Saale 2009, in untergegangenen reichen, Edition Rugerup, Berlin 2017 and reise, reise, edition buchhaus loschwitz Dresden 2018, Polish translations by Ewa Grześkowiak, Justina Helm, Wojciech Kunicki, Ewa Szymani, Natalia Żarska, Arcana, Kraków 2020. ISBN 978-8365350534

== Reception ==
The German writer and physician Uwe Tellkamp on Bernig's new novel "Eschenhaus": "[...] The artist Jörg Bernig has referred to the political issue and all the informers to where they belong. That is not only exemplary in human terms. Such a book from all the attacks that Attitude snooping, deriving from the base is an achievement in itself in the actual, the artistic achievement. The book is a masterpiece.[…]I lived with the characters, their cautious, doubtful truth, which may be ignored or dismissed, but remain - the prophecy convinces with enough reality. "Eschenhaus" is a novel whose format and aesthetic qualities one should be able to appreciate even if his worldview contradicts his own. Bernig has succeeded in a coup, a book that will last."

== Awards ==
- 2000 Friedrich-Hölderlin-Prize from the city of Bad Homburg v.d.H.
- 2001 Else-Heiliger-Fellowship
- 2002 Writer in Residence, University of Aberdeen, Scotland
- 2003 Arras Prize for Arts and Culture
- 2005 sponsorship award for the Lessing Prize of the Free State of Saxony
- 2005 Sudeten German Culture Prize for literature
- 2007 scholarship from the Cultural Foundation of the Free State of Saxony
- 2008 grant from the German Literature Fund
- 2011 Eichendorff Literature Prize
- 2013 Art Prize of the district town of Radebeul
- 2013 Writer-in-Residence, University of Wales, Swansea
- 2014 scholarship holder of the Prague House of Literature for German-language authors
- 2016 3rd Kamenzer Speech in St. Annen
- 2018 Poet in Residence, Dresden
- 2022 Andreas Gryphius Prize

== Poetry of Bernig in music ==
2017 "Bömischer Friedhof" from "in untergegangenen reichen", composed by Daniel Hensel as Op.30 "Bohemian Cemetery", for soprano and orchestra after Jörg Bernig

2021-2022 "wüten gegen die stunden" composed by Daniel Hensel in the 1st symphony "A song in the higher choir. From the deep I call LORD to you"; electro-acoustic, dedicated to the memory of my father; Speaker Jörg Bernig and Anna-Maximiliane Geraldine Hensel; funded by NEUSTART KULTUR "Stipendienprogramm 2021" of the GERMAN German federal ministry for culture and GEMA; Original broadcast on September 22, 2022, at 10:05 p.m. on BR Klassik, composed 2021–2022, based on a eulogy by Anna-Maximiliane Geraldine Hensel and poems from "wüten gegen die stunden" by Jörg Bernig
