= Karla Schneider =

German author (born 1938)

Karla Schneider (born 14 November 1938 in Dresden) is a German writer.

== Life ==
After Abitur, Karla Schneider worked in a factory in the GDR for a year, after which she trained as a bookseller. She moved to Federal Republic of Germany in 1979 and lives as a freelance author in Wuppertal. She writes books of children's and youth literature. She also writes books for adults. In 1989 she received the Astrid Lindgren Prize from the Oetinger-Verlag, in 1993 2nd prize in the competition for the Bettina von Arnim Prize and on 16 June 2008 she was awarded the Astrid Lindgren Prize. On 16 June 2008, Schneider was awarded the Alex-Wedding-Prize, whose jury included Thomas Rosenlöcher, Klaus Kordon and Gundel Mattenklott.

== Works ==
- Die Brauerei auf dem Kissen. Berlin 1974 (under the name „Karla Sander“).
- Der Mensch und sein Drachen. Düsseldorf u. a. 1988.
- Spätprogramm. Lohr 1988.
- Die Suche nach der Lerche. Erlangen 1989.
- Fünfeinhalb Tage zur Erdbeerzeit. Hamburg 1989.
- Vielleicht sind Schränke gar nicht so. Lahr 1989.
- Der Knabenkrautgarten. Zürich 1989.
- Ritter Suppengrün und das süße Geheimnis. Würzburg 1991.
- Lauter Windeier. Weinheim 1992.
- Die abenteuerliche Geschichte der Filomena Findeisen. Weinheim u. a. 1992.
- Kor, der Engel. Zürich 1992.
- Wenn man Märri Schimmel heißt. Weinheim 1993.
- Almuth und Helene. Zürich 1993.
- Die Reise in den Norden. Weinheim 1995.
- Merits Geburtstag. Berlin 1996.
- Matti Sörensen und Petja Wuppdich. München 1996.
- Zwischen Kloppe und Glück oder Wer sammelt hat mehr vom Leben. Weinheim 1997, ISBN 3-407-78842-8.
- Der Zaun. Hamburg 2000.
- Rückkehr nach Podgoritza. Frankfurt am Main 2001, ISBN 3-89561-082-8.
- Der klügste Hase unter der Sonne, Weinheim 2003, ISBN 3-407-79846-6.
- Glückskind. München 2003, ISBN 3-446-20334-6.
- Marcolini oder wie man Günstling wird. München 2007, ISBN 978-3-446-20905-3.
- Großvater und ich. München 2008, ISBN 978-3-423-62366-7.
- Wenn ich das 7. Geißlein wär'. Köln 2009, ISBN 978-3-414-82183-6.
- Holly Vogeltritt. Ein Märchen. Düsseldorf 2009, ISBN 978-3-7941-5217-9.
- Der Sommer, als ich Filmstar war. München 2010, ISBN 978-3-423-62447-3.
- Die Geschwister Apraksin. Das Abenteuer einer unfreiwilligen Reise. München 2011, ISBN 978-3-423-62490-9.
- Tova und die Sache mit der Liebe. Hanser, München 2013, ISBN 978-3-446-24315-6.
