= Gerhard Uhde =

German writer (b. 1902, d. 1980)

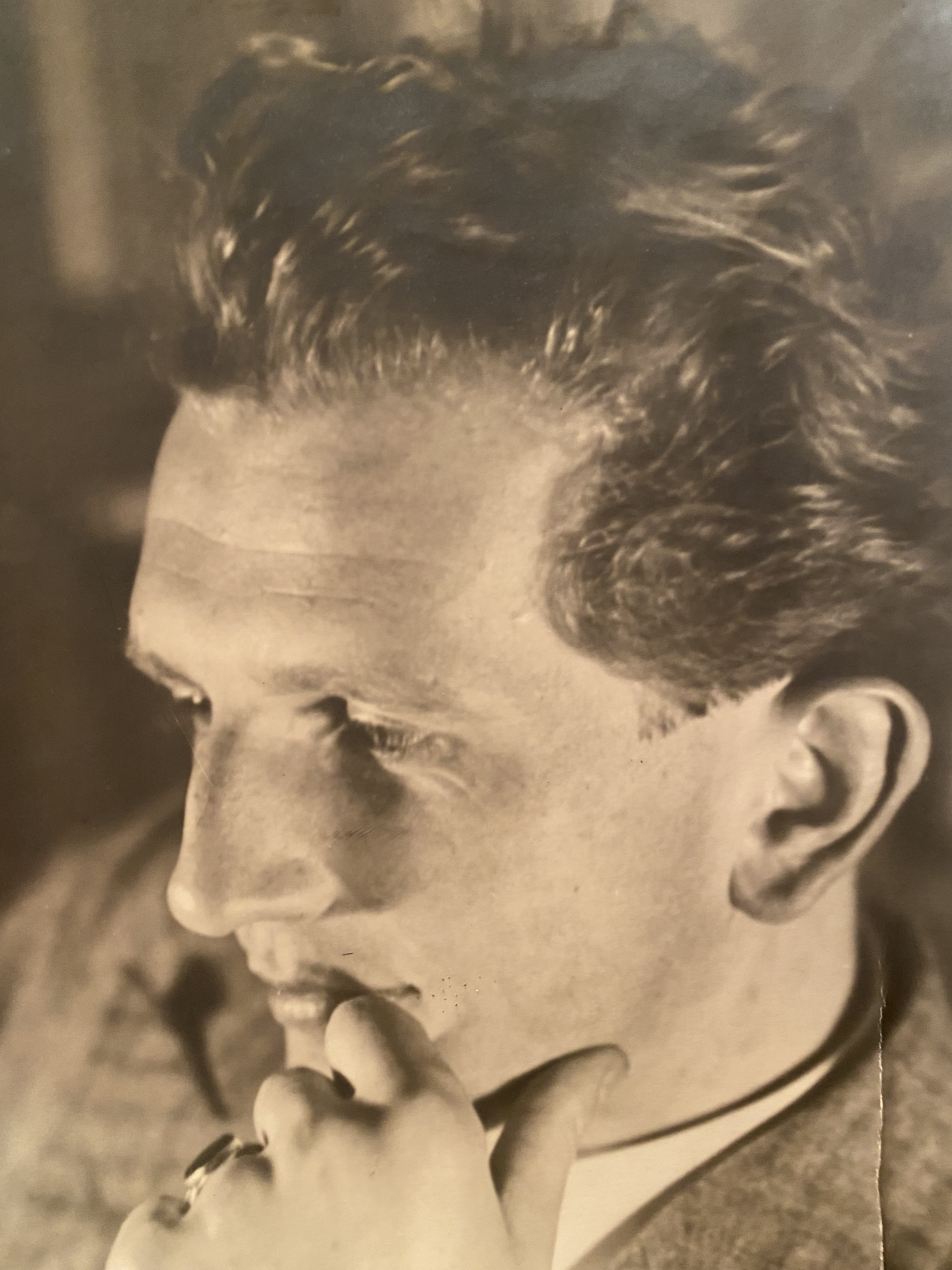

Gerhard Uhde (7 August 1902 - 7 August 1980), born Gerhard Gotthilf Karl Krienke, also known just as Uhde, was a novelist, journalist, poet, actor and theater director. He was born in Torun (Thorn), a town in West Prussia, which became part of Poland under the Treaty of Versailles in 1920. He grew up in Ratibor/Upper Silesia and was connected to the youth movement. Already as a young adult, he was permitted, due to his artistic stature, to adopt the professional name of Uhde.

== Life ==
After studying at the Universities of Erlangen, Bonn and Hamburg, he was drawn to the stage. In 1933, Gottfried Haass-Berkow was appointed the director of a new theater in Esslingen, near Stuttgart, which Gerhard joined as an actor and assistant director. There he met Tordis, the stepdaughter of Haass-Berkow, who was employed as an actress and teacher at the theater. They were married on 3 October 1933 and their son Björn was born on 1 July 1934. It was at this time that the political situation in Germany became very unstable, which created the opportunity for the eventual takeover by the Nazis under the leadership of Adolf Hitler.

Later in 1934 Gerhard met Beryl Sharland, a young actress of English/American background in Haass-Berkow's theater, whom he eventually married following his divorce from Tordis. They had four children: Sven, born on 9 October 1935, Pamela in 1937, Volker in 1939 and Monika in 1948.

Toward the end of his life, Gerhard Uhde formed a close relationship with Ella Schneider, a long-time friend dating from his years in Heidenheim, who was instrumental in organizing his literary estate. Gerhard Uhde died on 7 August 1980, his 78th birthday, and was buried in a section of the Bad Hersfeld cemetery reserved for distinguished citizens. Many of his manuscripts, letters, as well as unpublished short stories are archived at the Louis-Demme Stadtarchiv in Bad Hersfeld.

== Works ==
Spiel vom verlorenen sohn, Play, 1924 (about a lost son)
Der Bibelrekrut, Novel, 1929
Kristall aus Sieben, Chronicle, 1931 (about an amateur theater group)
Die Goldene Gans, Play, 1932 (based on fairy tales)
An beiden Ufern, Poems, 1935
April bis Marz und ein Kinderkerz, (Children's?) Stories, 1936
Königin aus Holz, Novel, 1937
Veronika and Angela, Novella, 1938
Gesicht im Dunkeln, Novel, 1939
Moosburger Tafeln, Poems, 1946 (written during his imprisonment)
Die Botschaft des Schlafenden, unpublished manuscript, 1946
Westöstliches Geständnis, Novella, 1950
Der Sprechende Stein, 1956 (novel?) (about the Stiftsruine cloister ruins in Bad Hersfeld)
Lioba Lebt, Novel, 1960. An “expanded” seventh edition was published in 1976
Umtrunk im Sternensaal, Poems, 1962
Der Lebensbaum, Short Stories, 1962
Das Rettende Buch, Memoir (of wartime experiences), 1965
Allen Gewalten zum Trutz, 1969 (reflections on life's experiences)
Tagellöhner in einer kleinen Stadt, a combination of facts and fiction (novel?), 1977
Die Gesandten, Play, 1977
Auf der Brücke, anthology of poems from five decades (which decades?), 1979

== Awards and honors ==
1968 – Eichendorff Literary Prize
1974 – Golden Honorary Plaque from Bad Hersfeld
1977 – Cross of Merit of the German Republic
1981 – Certificate of the AWMM (Arbeitsgemeinschaft für Werbung Markt- und Meinungsforschung), Buchs, Switzerland, «awarded posthumously to the poet and writer Gerhard Uhde for his complete body of works, thus honoring him as one of the most important German-speaking authors of the 20th century.”
