= Tamara Ehlert =

German writer and lyricist (1921–2008)

Tamara Ehlert, aka Tamara Traumann (28 December 1921 – 8 September 2008) was a German writer and lyricist.

She was born in Königsberg, and trained in theatre and dance. During the Second World War she worked as a telephone and radio operator. She worked as an interpreter for the British occupation government after the war. From 1951 onwards, she was employed by the Bayerischer Rundfunk.

Her first publication was in the Königsberger Tageblatt in 1938, and after 1945 her poems and short stories were regularly in print. She died in Munich, aged 86.

Ehlert lived in Munich and had two daughters.

== Awards ==
- Award of Brentano book publishing department, Stuttgart (1954)
- Nicolaus Copernicus Award (1970)
- Andreas Gryphius Award (1976)

== Bibliography ==
- Die Dünenhexe (1950) Shortstories
- Spröder Wind von Ost (1971) Poetry
- Kleiner alter Mann geht durch den Wind (1976) Poetry
- Das silberne Fräulein (1976) Tales and Poems
- So war der Frühling in meiner Stadt" (1993) Poems and Prose
