= Tomasz Skweres =

Polish composer (born 1984)

Tomasz Skweres (born 3 April 1984 in Warsaw) is a Polish composer who lives and works in Vienna.

== Biography ==
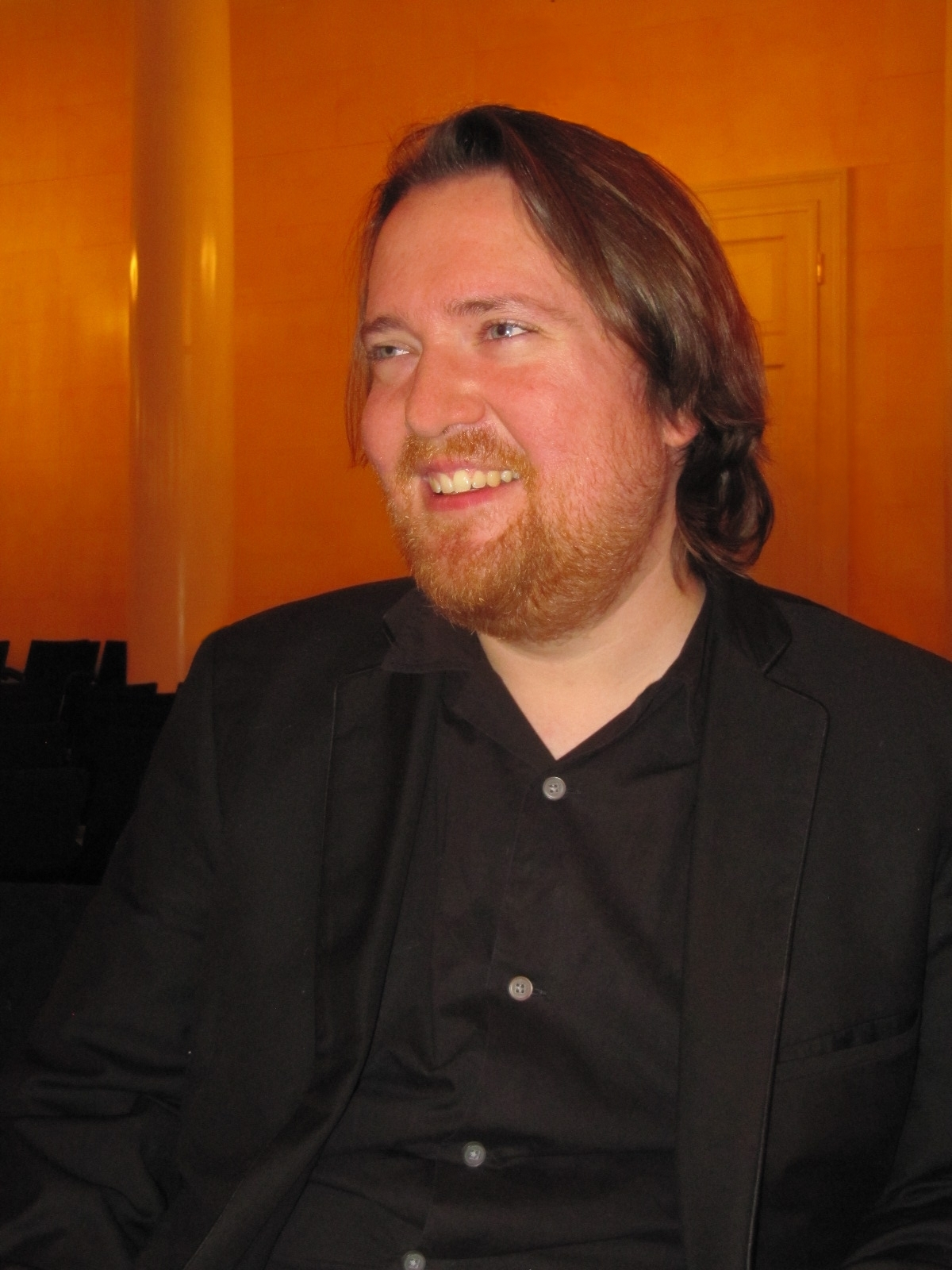

Tomasz Skweres was born in Warsaw, Poland. In 1997 he moved to Austria, where he studied composition at the University of Music and Performing Arts, Vienna with Chaya Czernowin and Detlev Müller-Siemens. Skweres also studied cello with Valentin Erben at the same university.

He composed a number of chamber music works, orchestral compositions and works for choir. His music has been performed at Wiener Musikverein, Konzerthaus in Vienna, Gasteig in Munich, Trafo House of Contemporary Arts in Budapest, Lviv Philharmony (Ukraine), Cantacuzino palace in Bukarest (Meridian Festival), Teatro Universitario de la BUAP in Puebla (Mexico), Guangzhou Concert Hall (China), Teatro da Reitoria in Curiciba (Bienal Música Hoje (Brasil)), Nørre Vosborg Chamber Music Festival (Denmark) as well as in Japan, Taiwan, Argentina and Australia. His works has been broadcast by Bayerischer Rundfunk (Germany), ABC Classic FM (Australia), Frequencia Universitaria (Mexico), Ö1 (Austrian state broadcasting station), Radio Stephansdom (Austria) and recorded for Genuin classics, Orlando records a.o.

Since 2012 Tomasz Skweres has been Principal Cellist in the Philharmonic Orchestra Regensburg in Germany and since 2020 cellist of the ensemble for contemporary music Risonanze Erranti in Munich. He is an active interpreter in the field of contemporary music. As a soloist, chamber musician and guest of such ensembles like Collegium Novum in Zurich, ÖENM (Austrian Ensemble for New Music) in Salzburg, Ensemble Reconsil and Platypus Ensemble Vienna he performs modern music in renowned concert halls all over the world. Tomasz Skweres gives solo recitals with contemporary cello pieces in such renowned international festivals as Warsaw Autumn or Meridian Festival in Bucharest. Many contemporary composers composed and dedicated solo pieces to him. 2016-2017 he was lecturer for cello at the Musik University in Detmold (Hochschule für Musik Detmold) and 2015 at the HfKM Regensburg – College of Catholic Church Music & Musical Education in Regensburg.

Works by Tomasz Skweres are published by Sikorski Music Publishers in Hamburg and Doblinger Publisher in Vienna and were broadcast in different countries (Austria, Germany, Italy, Poland, Australia, Mexico, Cuba) and recorded by professional labels as Genuine, Hänssler Classic, Col legno, Orlando Records.

== Commissions ==
Tomasz Skweres was commissioned to compose orchestral works for the Vienna Radio Symphony Orchestra, Wiener Konzerthaus, the Orchestra of Theater Regensburg, Biennale Bern (Stadttheater Bern) and chamber music works for the Festival Wien Modern, the International Society for Contemporary Music, ÖGZM (Austrian Society for contemporary Music), the Apollon Musagete Quartet, Reconsil Ensemble, Ensemble Wiener Collage a.o. In the last years the compositions for orchestra, especially for symphonic orchestra play the most important role in the artistic development of Tomasz Skweres - he wrote pieces commissioned by Radio Symphony Orchestra Vienna, Konzerthaus in Vienna, Philharmonic Orchestra Regensburg (D), Niederbayerische Philharmonie(D), Leopoldinum Orchestra (PL) and Hastings Philharmonic (GB). He received also commissions by renowned ensembles such as Apollon Musagete Quartet (PL), Contemporary Music Orchestra (PL), Ensemble Zeitfluss (A), Ensemble Wiener Collage (A) and others. Works by Tomasz Skweres are regularly performed by famous important festivals all over the world, such as Wien Modern (Vienna), Warsaw Autumn, Musica Polonica Nova (Wrocław), Biennial Bern, ISCM World Music Days 2016 in Korea/Tongyeong International Music Festival, Festival Musica 2015 in Strasbourg (France), Festival Klangspuren in Tirol (Austria), Festival Goslar Harz (Germany), Leo Festival (Wrocław) and many others.

== Works ==
=== Works for orchestra ===
- Konzert for cello and orchestra, 2020
- Haymatloz for symphonic orchestra, 2019
- Plutonion for symphonic orchestra, 2018
- Concertino for string orchestra, 2018
- Anakalypteria for female voice for symphonic orchestra, 2016
- über das farbige Licht der Doppelsterne... for symphonic orchestra, 2015
- Critical Mass for symphonic orchestra, 2013
- Notturno for cello and orchestra, 2011

=== chamber operas ===
- Desiderium for two sopranos, zwei actors and small Ensemble, libretto by Maria Skweres, 2018
- Am Anfang starb ein Rabe – for speaking voice, baritone and ensemble, libretto by Levin Westermann, 2010

=== Works for Ensemble ===
- Leyak for Baritonsaxophon, 2 cellos and 4 percussionists, 2021
- Topielica for Englischhorn solo und Ensemble, 2019
- Event Horizon for 15 Instruments, 2019
- von Schwelle zu Schwelle for 13 instruments, 2015
- Tituba for 8 instrument, 2013

=== Works With Voice ===
- Denuo for soprano and large ensemble, 2021
- Four Poems by Rainer Maria Rilke for Sopran and six instruments, 2020
- Firmamente, for soprano, violon cello, poems by Brigitte Stanek, 2020
- contra venenosos vermes for cello solo and vocal ensemble, 2019
- w poszukiwaniu Rzeczydźwięku for soprano and cello, 2019
- Rovanemi for soprano and cello, poem by Brigitte Stanek, 2017
- in fremder fremde for mezzo-soprano and piano, poem by Semier Insayif, 2016
- mori no sakana for soprana, bass clarinet and cello, poem by Erika Kimura, 2014
- Die Geometrie des Himmels ist unerhört, poems by Semier Insayif for speaking voice and small ensemble, 2014
- Sakubel Osil for soprano, flute, clarinet, violin and cello, 2008/new version 2014
- Direkt für soprano, flute and cello, 2007
- Psalm 13 for tenor, flute and cello, 2006
- Gebet for soprano and cello, poem by Małgorzata Hillar, 2005

=== Chamber music ===
- Paysage Intime for cello and piano, 2022
- Aquarelle 594KV, miniature for flute, clarinet, vibraphone, violin and cello, 2021
- Erdschatten for baroque flute and harpsichord, 2021
- Nyos for violin und cello, 2021
- Plague for 8 cellos, 2020
- Piwosznik for bass clarinet und cello, 2019
- Heavy Gravity for 2 violins, 2019
- Synapsen, four miniature for historical instruments, recorder, baroque trombone and viol, 2018
- Katakomben for violin, cello and organ, 2018
- Anekdote über Stravinsky, miniature for violin and piano, 2018
- Coffin Ship for cello and accordion, 2018
- Coffin Ship for soprano saxophone and accordion, 2018
- sieben Affekte for violin and Cello, 2017
- Maledictio for recorder, flute, harp and cembalo, 2017
- Grenzgänge for piano quartett, 2016
- Journay into the Subconscious for flute, cello and piano, 2014
- Elusive Thoughts for violin, viola and cello, 2014
- Memory Illussions for violin and harp, 2014
- Penrose Square for saxophone quartet, 2014
- 5 Miniaturen for saxophone, clarinet, accordion and double bass, 2013
- Hesitation for cello and piano, 2012
- Spannungsfelder for cello und double bass, 2012
- 5 Elemente for guitar and piano, 2010
- Autismus for flute and cembalo, 2010
- Axon for flute and clarinet, 2010
- Asteria-Ortygia-Delos for string quartet, 2009
- Wasser for piano trio, 2008
- 1st string quartet, 2006

=== Works for Solo Instruments ===
- Enigmatic Pathways for viola solo, 2022
- Suite Macabre for cello solo, 2021
- Sport ist Mord for double bass solo, 2020
- Impact for violin solo, 2016
- drei Gedanken for clarinet solo, 2016
- Guillotine for cello solo, 2016
- Guillotine for double bass solo, 2016
- Short Story for guitar solo, 2013
- Reminiszenz for violine solo 2013
- Deuterium for violin solo 2012
- Double-headed for horn solo 2012
- Transformations for cello solo, 2011
- Verse for cello solo, 2009

== Awards and Scholarships ==
- 2021 1st prize Earplay Donald Aird International Composers Competition, USA
- 2021 1st prize Gilgamesh International composition competition, USA
- 2021 state scholarship for composition of the Austrian ministry for culture and education
- 2020 1st prize 1st Chalki international composition competition, Greece
- 2019 2nd prize Zemlinsky Prize 2019
- 2018 2nd prize 20th International Chopin & Friends Festival "New Vision" composition competition
- 2017 1st prize TONALi composition competition
- 2016 spezial prize international composition competition Citta' di Udine
- 2015 promotional award of the city of Vienna
- 2014 state scholarship for composition of the Austrian ministry for culture and education
- 2014 1st prize Ernst Krenek composition competition
- 2010 start scholarship of the Austrian ministry for culture and education
- 2009 1st prize composition competition for the obligatory work for the international Joseph Haydn chamber music competition, Vienna
- 2009 Theodor-Körner-Preis in composition
- 2009 2nd prize international composition competition of the Deutsche Hochdruckliga
- 2009 composition scholarship of the Czibulka-Stiftung
- 2008 composition scholarship of the Swiss Thyll-Dürr-Stiftung
- 2008 2nd prize international Franz Josef Reinl composition competition
- 2006 1st prize composition competition for the obligatory work for the international Joseph Haydn chamber music competition, Vienna

== Discography ==
- Coffin Ship for saxophone and accordion, East West, Duo Aliada, Hänssler Classic, 2021
- Contra Venenosos Vermes for cello and mixed choir – Wrocławscy Kameraliści, 2019
- Short Story for guitar solo – Soundscapes III, Genuin classics, 2015 (artist: Rainer Stegmann)
- Tituba for mixed ensemble – Exploring the World Vol. 2, Orlando Records, 2015 (artist: Reconsil Ensemble)
- Asteria-Ortygia-Delos for string quartet – Austrian Young Composers Vol. 3, Österreichischer Komponistenbund and IGNM (artist: Apollon Musagète Quartett)
- Asteria-Ortygia-Delos for string quartet – Contemporanea 2014, Globe Records (artist: Interensemble)
