= Dagmar von Mutius =

German writer (1919–2008)

Dagmar von Mutius (17 October 1919 – 5 November 2008) was a German writer. She was the daughter of a diplomat and born in Oslo. She spent her childhood and youth abroad, in Silesia on the family estate and in Berlin. She studied language and was working in agriculture. She took over the management of the family estate, which was converted into a Polish state estate after 1945. Then she was relocated from Silesia. She worked as French interpreter (business school). From 1950 Dagmar von Mutius lived in Heidelberg. In 1954 the first stories appeared in magazines and anthologies and in 1960 the first book. In addition to her work as a writer, she worked as a literary reviewer and participated in the well-known book discussions on Radio Bremen in the 1970s. Until her retirement, Mutius was a bookseller in Heidelberg. She died there on 5 November 2008.

== Awards ==
- 1963 Eichendorff-Literaturpreis
- 1973 Hörspiel und Erzählerpreis der Stiftung Ostdeutscher Kulturrat
- 1965 Ehrengabe des Andreas-Gryphius-Preises der Künstlergilde e.V. (bis 1965 Ostdeutscher Literaturpreis)
- 1967 Prize of the Hermann Sudermann Foundation, Berlin
- 1987 Order of Merit of the Federal Republic of Germany
- 1988 Sonderpreis zum Kulturpreis Schlesien des Landes Niedersachsen
- 1990 "Pro arte Medaille" of the Künstlergilde Esslingen/Neckar

== Works ==
- Wetterleuchten. Chronik einer schlesischen Provinz 1945/46. Verlag Vandenhoeck & Ruprecht, Göttingen 1961. (3. Auflage: Bergstadtverlag Wilhelm Gottlieb Korn, Würzburg 1988, ISBN 3-87057-111-X.)
- Grenzwege. Verlag Vandenhoeck & Ruprecht, Göttingen 1963.
- Wandel des Spiels. Verlag Vandenhoeck & Ruprecht, Göttingen 1966.
- Versteck ohne Anschlag. Verlag Werner Jerratsch, Heidenheim/Brenz 1975.
- Einladung in ein altes Haus. Verlag Werner Jerratsch, Heidenheim/Brenz 1980, ISBN 3-921519-40-3.
- Draußen der Nachtwind. Bergstadtverlag Korn, Würzburg 1985, ISBN 3-87057-105-5.
- Lektionen der Stille. Bergstadtverlag Korn, Würzburg 1989.
- Besuch am Rande der Tage. Bergstadtverlag Korn, Würzburg 1994.
- Eleonore Haugwitz (Pseudonym): 1945/46 auf einem Gutshof in der Grafschaft Glatz. In: Meine Heimat Schlesien. Weltbild-Verlag, Augsburg 1990, ISBN 3-7844-1910-0.
