= Lissy (film) =

1957 film

- Directed by: Konrad Wolf
- Written by: Konrad Wolf; Alex Wedding
- Starring: Sonja Sutter; Horst Drinda; Hans-Peter Minetti
- Cinematography: Werner Bergmann
- Edited by: Lena Neumann
- Music by: Joachim Werzlau
- Production company: DEFA
- Release date: 30 May 1957
- Running time: 89 minutes
- Country: East Germany
- Language: German

Lissy is a 1957 East German film directed by Konrad Wolf, based on a novel by Franz Carl Weiskopf. It was released on 30 May 1957.

== Plot ==
Lissy Schroeder, a working-class girl in Berlin, marries Alfred, a clerk. In 1932, Alfred is fired by his Jewish boss. Despite having ties to the Communist party through Lissy's brother Paul, the previously apolitical Alfred joins the Nazi party. After Hitler gains power, Paul is shot by the Nazis, causing Lissy to question the country's and her husband's politics and where her loyalties truly lie.

== Cast ==
- Sonja Sutter as Lissy Schröder / Frohmeyer
- Horst Drinda as Alfred Frohmeyer
- Hans-Peter Minetti as Paul Schröder
- Kurt Oligmüller as Kaczmierczik
- Gerhard Bienert as Vater Schröder
- Else Wolz as Mutter Schröder
- Raimund Schelcher as Max Franke
- Christa Gottschalk as Toni Franke
