= Ilse Tielsch =

Austrian author

Ilse Tielsch (born Ilse Felzmann 20 March 1929 – 21 February 2023) was an Austrian writer.

== Life ==
Ilse Tielsch was born on 20 March 1929 in Hustopeče, Czechoslovakia. She was the daughter of Fritz Felzmann (1895–1980), a doctor, writer and musicologist. She grew up in Hustopeče and attended high school in Mikulov. In April 1945, she fled from the approaching front and was accepted into an Upper Austrian farm in Schlierbach . She continued attending high school in Linz, from September 1945 and graduated from high school in Vienna in 1948. In 1949, she became an Austrian citizen, and in 1950, she married the doctor Rudolf Tielsch, They had four children, two of whom died young.

She studied newspaper studies and German studies at the University of Vienna. She worked for several daily and weekly newspapers and taught at a Viennese vocational school from 1955 to 1964. She has lived in Vienna as a freelance writer.

She wrote poetry, novels and non-fiction. The first books were published under the double name Tielsch-Felzmann; on the advice of Hans Weigel, she changed her surname to Tielsch in 1979. Her poems and books have been translated into 20 languages and published in 22 countries.

Ilse Tielsch wrote a trilogy of novels (The Ancestral Pyramid, Searching for Home, and The Fruits of Tears). In it she dealt with the topic of loss of homeland, and the history of German-speaking Moravia.

Tielsch was a member of the Austrian Writers' Association, the Austrian Society for Literature, the Austrian PEN Club and a founding member of the Podium literary circle.

In 1981, she was appointed to the Sudeten German Academy of Sciences and Arts as a full member of the class of arts and art sciences .

Since 2017, the Viennese publisher Edition Atelier has been republishing selected works by Tielsch. After her novel The Last Year, which was first published in Edition Atelier in 2006, the first volume of her novel trilogy, The Ahnenpyramide, and the second volume, Home Search, were published in 2019.

She died on 21 February 2023 in Vienna, at the age of 93.

== Works ==
- Memories with trees, Ariadne Press, 1993. ISBN 9780929497655
- The Ancestral Pyramid, Ariadne Press, 2001. ISBN 9781572410909
- The final year, Ariadne Press, 2010.

== Honours ==
She won the Franz Theodor Csokor Prize.
