= Ida-Dehmel-Literaturpreis =

German literary award

Ida-Dehmel-Literaturpreis is a literary prize in Germany. Awarded every three years, it was created by the Societies of female artists and their supporters ("Gemeinschaften der Künstlerinnen und Kunstförderer e. V." / GEDOK) to honour Ida Dehmel.

== Winners ==
- 1968: Hilde Domin
- 1971: Erika Burkart
- 1975: Margot Scharpenberg
- 1977: Rose Ausländer
- 1980: Ingeborg Drewitz
- 1983: Barbara Frischmuth
- 1986: Eva Zeller
- 1989: Brigitte Kronauer
- 1992: Sarah Kirsch
- 1995: Elke Erb
- 1998: Herta Müller
- 2001: Helga M. Novak
- 2004: Kerstin Hensel
- 2007: Doris Runge
- 2010: Ulla Hahn
- 2014: Karla Schneider
- 2017: Monika Maron
- 2020: Ulrike Draesner
- 2024: Nora Gomringer
