= Dirk Balthaus =

German jazz pianist

Dirk Balthaus (born 1965 in Oberhausen) is a German jazz pianist. He is leader of the Dirk Balthaus Trio, which performed with Lars Dietrich at the North Sea Jazz Festival in 1998. He is also a member of the Old and New Quartet.

== Recordings ==
- Gerlo Hesselink Quartet: "Garden of stones" 2013 independent
- Lochs/Balthaus/Herskedal: "Choices" 2012 Berthold Records
- Millennium Jazz Orchestra: "Distrust all rules" 2011 St. MJO
- Millennium Jazz Orchestra: "Pretty Pumps" 2010 St. MJO
- Lochs/Balthaus/Herskedal: „kein Titel“ 2009 MUC
- Dirk Balthaus Trio: „Consolation“ 2009 Hi5 Records
- Cotton Club All Stars: „Amsterdam Jam“ 2007 Hi5 Records
- Léah Kline: „Juzz Flirtin“ 2007 Theatrics/Hi5 Records
- Balthaus/Lumeij/Grimbergen: „Gershwin“ 2006 Hi5 Records
- George Carlo M.: „Smooth Road“ 2004 Munich Records
- Volker Winck Quartet: „Body & Soul“ 2003 independent
- Willem Hellbreker Quartet: „Resonance“ 2003 Munich Records
- Dirk Balthaus Trio: „On Children's Ground“ 2002 Munich Records
- Dirk Balthaus Sextet: „The Healing“ 1997 Via Records
- Hot Bolshevik: „Post Cold War Groove“, 1995 Red Boogie
- Balthaus/Lochs 4-tet: „Tales of the frog“ 1994 ac.music records
