= Gerrit-Engelke-Preis =

Literary prize of Germany (1979–2005)

Gerrit-Engelke-Preis was a literary prize of Hanover, parallel to Kurt-Morawietz-Literaturpreis. Both are replaced by Hölty-Preis.

- 1979: Günter Herburger and Günter Wallraff
- 1981: Ingeborg Drewitz
- 1983: Axel Eggebrecht
- 1985: Max von der Grün
- 1987: Gisela Elsner
- 1989: Friedrich Christian Delius
- 1991: Adam Seide
- 1993: Helga M. Novak
- 1995: Erich Hackl
- 1997: Dea Loher
- 1999: Kerstin Hensel
- 2001: Angela Krauß
- 2003: Lothar Baier
- 2005: Lukas Bärfuss
