= Tilo Medek =

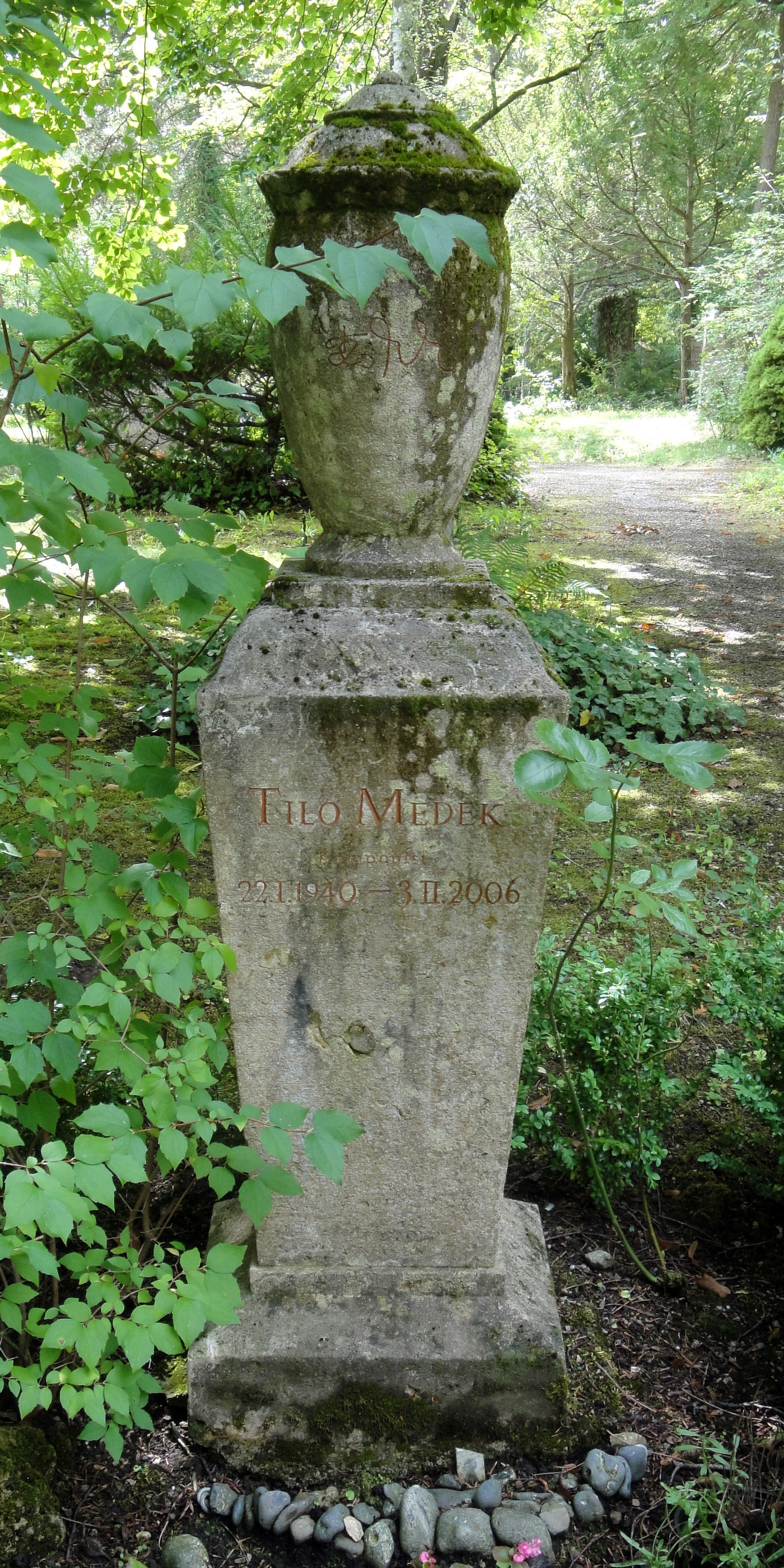
- Medek's grave in the Nordfriedhof in Jena
- Born: Tilo Gerhard Müller-Medek; 22 January 1940; Jena, Germany
- Died: 3 February 2006 (aged 66); Duderstadt, Germany
- Education: Humboldt University of Berlin; Deutsche Hochschule für Musik
- Occupations: Classical composer; Musicologist
- Awards: State University of New York; Ernst-Reuter-Preis

Tilo Medek, originally Müller-Medek (22 January 1940 – 3 February 2006), was a German classical composer, musicologist and music publisher. He grew up in East Germany, but was inspired by the Darmstädter Ferienkurse. He composed radio plays and incidental music. His setting of Lenin's Decree on Peace led to restrictions, and after he showed solidarity with the expatriated Wolf Biermann, he also had to move to the West, where he composed an opera Katharina Blum based on Heinrich Böll's novel, and worked in education. He received international awards from 1967 onwards.

== Career ==
Müller-Medek was born in Jena, the son of the composer and musician Willy Müller-Medek (1897–1965) and his wife Rosa (1902–1976). He received musical training at the Jenaer Musikschule in violin, piano, improvisation and music theory. In 1957 he attended the 12th Darmstädter Ferienkurse in the western part of Germany where he took classes with Alexander Jemnitz, Luigi Nono, Hermann Scherchen and Karlheinz Stockhausen.

From 1959 to 1962, he studied piano with Kurt Johnen in Quedlinburg. He received his Abitur in 1959, and studied then at the Humboldt University of Berlin, musicology with Walther Vetter, Ernst Hermann Meyer and Georg Knepler. He also took courses in psychology with Kurt Gottschaldt, in art history with Karl-Heinz Clasen, in theology with Lieselotte Richter and in garden architecture with Willy Kurth. He studied at the same time composition with Rudolf Wagner-Régeny at the Deutsche Hochschule für Musik in East Berlin.

From 1962, Medek worked as a répétiteur for the ensemble of the Berliner Arbeiterjugend, and as a composer of radio plays and incidental music. In 1964 he wrote his thesis in musicology: Die Vertonungen von Goethes Prometheus-Gedicht. In 1968, his work was first restricted, because of his compositions Das Dekret über den Frieden after Lenin's Decree on Peace, and "Battaglia alla turca" (later No. 1 from Lesarten an zwei Klavieren). Lenin's text, slightly shortened, is set for speaker and percussion (Schlag-Idiophone, Schlagtrommeln), with the speaker in the middle of the audience, while the percussionists are positioned in the back of the audience in four corners, playing with growing intensity which in the end drowns the voice. In 1977, Medek criticized the Darmstadt School and its influence in the GDR. When Wolf Biermann had to leave the country on 15 July 1977, Medek protested and then also moved to the West. From 1982, he ran the music publishing house Musikverlag Edition Tilo Medek. In 1984 he composed the opera Katharina Blum to a libretto by his wife, Dorothea Medek, based on Heinrich Böll's novel Die verlorene Ehre der Katharina Blum (The Lost Honour of Katharina Blum). Revised in 1986, it premiered at the Theater Bielefeld on 20 April 1991. Medek died in Duderstadt in 2006.

== Work ==
Medek's works included chamber music and piano pieces, and settings of poetry by Bertolt Brecht which were performed by singers such as Sonja Kehler. He composed many works for choir and orchestra, receiving international recognition for Die Todesfuge after Paul Celan's poem "Todesfuge". Medek composed two radio plays broadcast by Radio DDR 1. He wrote extended stage works, such as the opera Katharina Blum. He composed three symphonies: Die Eisenblätter, Die Rheinische, Die Sorbische, and several concertos for solo instrument and orchestra. He wrote many works for organ. He received awards for his Die betrunkene Sonne (The drunk sun) for speaker and orchestra, a melodrama for children on a text by Sarah Kirsch, and for Kindermesse (Children's Mass), written in memory of the children murdered by the Nazis.

== Awards ==
- 1967: Internationaler Kompositionswettbewerb der Stiftung Gaudeamus, Niederlande (for Todesfuge)
- 1968: State University of New York (for Das Dekret über den Frieden)
- 1969: Opernwettbewerb DDR (for the opera Einzug)
- 1970: Friedrich-Kuhlau-Wettbewerb der Stadt Uelzen (for Kühl, nicht lau, No. 2 of the Lesarten an zwei Klavieren)
- 1975: 22 Tribune internationale des Composits of the UNESCO Paris (for the Kindermesse)
- 1975: Prix Folklorique de Radio Bratislava (for Der schwere Traum)
- 1977: Prix Danube in Bratislava for the KRO-Niederlande recording of the Kindermesse
- 1982: Ernst Reuter Prize, with Dorothea Medek for their feature Westöstliche Wechsel, ausgestellt in der Ankunftszeit

== Selected recordings ==
- Die betrunkene Sonne. Ein Melodram für Kinder für Sprecher und Orchester.
  - Nova 8 85 019, 1971 (A-Seite)
  - LP: Deutsche Grammophon DG-Junior 2546054, 1981
  - MC: Deutsche Grammophon DG-Junior, 3346054, 1981
  - CD: 26–27 June 1996 Schwerte SonArte, P 1997 2987610002, 1997
- CD: Musik für Kinder (3-CD set) Deutsche Grammophon, 459 606, 1998
- CD: El sol borracho, AgrupArte (Spain) ISBN 84-95423-04-9 (with illustrated booklet) 2000
- CD: Musik in Deutschland 1950–2000 (Box 3: Angewandte Musik, Disk 9) Deutscher Musikrat RCA RedSeal, 74321 73527 2 2001
- Tilo Medek: Orgelwerke. (Wandlungs-Passacaglia (2001), B-A-C-H, Vier Töne für Orgel (1973), Verschüttete Bauernflöte (1969), Quatemberfeste (1989), Gebrochene Flügel (1975), Rückläufige Passacaglia (1979)). Cybele Records, SACD 060.801 (2008)
- Triops-Botschaft – Das Gitarrenwerk von Tilo Medek. (A: Rosenlied – Pergola – Rautenkranz (1967/69), Albumblatt mit Randbemerkungen (1967/68), Venezianisches Naxos (1981); B: Erdrauch (1979), Triops - Botschaft (1985)). Ricophon LP 01030 ETM
- Tilo Medek: Cello Concerto. (Cello Concerto No. 1 (1978/82), Eine Stele für Bernd Alois Zimmermann (1976), Schattenspiele(1973). classic production osnabrück, cpo 777 520-2, 2010
- Kindermesse (Zum Gedenken der im Dritten Reich ermordeten Kinder) (1974) for children's choir
  - TV version: 4 May 1979, Niederländisches Fernsehen, II. Programm, KRO Hilversum
  - LP: Kindermesse und Struwwelpeter - Mannheimer Kinderchor, Edition Tilo Medek, 01012 1986
- CD: Musik in Deutschland 1950-2000 (Box 16: Musik für Chöre, Disk 1) Deutscher Musikrat, RCA RedSeal, 74321 73660 2 1998
- So ein Struwwelpeter / Musikalischer Bilderbogen für Sopransolo, Kinderchor und Solostimmen, Flöte, Fagott, Marimbaphon und andere Schlaginstrumente (1975), text: Hansgeorg Stengel
- CD: Landesmusikakademie NRW, audite!nova, LC 18939 2010

== Music for radio plays ==
- 1969: Bertolt Brecht Der Ozeanflug (radio play), also direction, with Kurt Veht, Radio DDR 1
- 1972: Agnieszka Osiecka: Appetit auf Frühkirschen (radio play) – direction: Albrecht Surkau, Radio DDR 1)
- 1973: Jiri Kafka: Vom Wasser, das zu singen aufhörte (radio play for children) – direction: Albrecht Surkau, Berliner Rundfunk

== Literature ==
- Fred K. Prieberg: Musik im anderen Deutschland. Cologne 1968 (Müller-Medek), p. 312–313, 315, 322
- Konrad Böhmer: Zwischen Reihe und Pop. Vienna 1970
- Komponistenwerkstatt in Arbeitshefte der Akademie der Künste der DDR. vol. 13. Berlin 1973
- A. Olivier: Musik ist Intimverkehr ohne Intimitäten – ein Interview. In: Status, Unabhängige Zeitschrift für Ärzte, 1978, No. 6, S. 96
- Hartmut Lück: Ein Marsch, der die Massen beunruhigen soll. In: NMZ, 1978, Nr.3, S.7
- Wolfgang Schreiber: Warum nicht mit Schumann vergleichen?- Portrait des Komponisten Tilo Medek, in: Musik und Medizin, 1978, Heft 11, S. 56 - 69
- Wolfgang Horn: Gegen die Musik der Abkapselung. In: Düsseldorfer Hefte, 1979, Heft 14. S.11 ff
- Wolfgang Horn: Einer, der auszog, vom Komponieren zu leben. In: Tilo Medek-Dokumentation Düsseldorf, Stadtbücherei
- Hartmut Lück: Musik über Musik oder wie man die Tradition beerbt, ohne traditionell zu komponieren. In: Tilo Medek-Dokumentation. Düsseldorf, Stadtbücherei
- H. Herbort: Muß ein Künstler sich sicher fühlen? – Ein Gespräch mit Tilo Medek und ein Uraufführungsberich über das Violinkonzert. In: Die Zeit, 12 August 1980, p. 51
- Oskar Gottlieb Blarr: Kennen Sie Medek? Über die Orgelfalte eines vielfältigen Komponisten. In: Ars Organi, year 29, book 1, March
- H. Herbort: Deutsche Weihnachtslieder by Tilo Medek. In: Die Zeit, 23 December 1983
- Tilo Medek - Ein Komponistenportrait. Fahmüller, Bonn 1984. - 29 Bl. Stadtbücherei Düsseldorf
- Ernst Klaus Schneider: Original und Bearbeitung - Tilo Medeks „Battaglia alla turca“. In: Kursmodelle Musik, Sekundarstufe II, Verlag Moritz Diesterweg
- H. Daschner: Tilo Medek "Die betrunkene Sonne". In: Musikwissenschaft, Universität Freiburg, 1985
- Gunter Duvenbeck: Absage an "Fortschrittsglauben" in der Musik – Anmerkungen zu einer Diskussion mit dem Komponisten Tilo Medek. In: Gunter Duvenbeck (ed.): Bonner Musikkalender, 15/1987, Bonn
- Gunter Duvenbeck: "Ich fühle mich immer unterwegs" – Ein Gespräch mit Tilo Medek. In: Generalanzeiger Köln/Bonn, 18/19 July 1987
- Carl Friedrich Schröer: Das neue Gretchen ist nicht pflegeleicht – Der Komponist Tilo Medek und seine Oper "Katharina Blum". In: Rheinischer Merkur / Christ und Welt, 18 September 1987
- Michaele Kinzelmann: Die Betrunkene Sonne von Tilo Medek. Wissenschaftliche Hausarbeit an der Pädagogischen Hochschule Freiburg, Februar 1988
- Gerd Brill im Gespräch mit Tilo Medek: Die Triopsbotschaft setzt sich durch …. In: musiblatt, 3/88, including reviews of Wurzelwerk and Triopsbotschaft
- Hans Gerd Brill: Das Gitarrenwerk Tilo Medeks. In: Zupfmusik magazin, 1/89
- Irmgard Jüsten: Ein Komponist zwischen Ost und West – Zum Schaffen Tilo Medeks vor und nach seiner Ausbürgerung aus der ehemaligen DDR. Universität Münster, Fachbereich Musikpädagogik, Stadtbücherei Düsseldorf
- Sabine Rabe: Studie zum Wort-Ton-Verhältnis der Brechtschen Liebeslieder in der Vertonung für Singstimme und Gitarre von Paul Dessau und Tilo Medek. Theoretische Arbeit zum Diplom, Hochschule "Hanns Eisler", Berlin 1994
- Daniel Höhr: Verweigerung durch Ausstieg – Tilo Medeks Komposition "König Johann oder der Ausstieg§". Seminararbeit, Rheinische Friedrich-Wilhelms-Universität zu Bonn, Englisches Seminar
- Brigitte Köchlin: Alla Turca - Bearbeitungen von Mozarts KV 331, 3. Satz unter dem Blickwinkel unterschiedlich funktionaler Zuordnungen. Studienseminar für das Lehramt, Neuss
- Katharina Kunze: Untersuchung zum Kantatenschaffen Tilo Medeks. Johann Gutenberg-Universität Mainz, Musikwissenschaftliches Institut, 1999
- Christof Götz: Norm oder Normverstoß – zum sozialistischen Realismus in der Musik der DDR – Dargelegt an ausgewählten Beispielen aus dem Musikleben der Stadt Jena, in den Uraufführungen seines städtischen Orchester in den Jahren 1969-1998. Hochschule Franz Liszt, Weimar
- Florian Scharmer: Das Bläserquintett bei Tilo Medek. thesis. Innsbrucker Musikpädagogikinstitut der Universität Mozarteum Salzburg, Oktober 1999
- Maike Neubert: Kompositionen für Kinder am Beispiel von Musikalischen Erzählungen. Thesis. Ludwig-Maximilians-Universität München
- Alexander von Nell: Trauerkompositionen & Requien in der DDR. thesis. Humboldt-Universität Berlin, 24 June 2004 (pp. 56–61: Todesfuge)
- Peter Gnoss: Ein unangepasster Komponist, zum Gedenken an den Komponisten Tilo Medek. In: fermate, Year 25. No. 2 2006
- Gedenkheft für Tilo Medek, with essays by Andreas Eckardt, Alfons Kontarsky, Andreas Dorschel, Peter Gülke, Hartmut Lück, Volker Tarnow, Achim Hofer and Hans Pölkow, among others ETM 215
- Ute Jung-Kaiser: Wir schaufeln ein Grab in den Lüften. In: Polyästhetik im 21. Jahrhundert. Peter Lang, Internationaler Verlag der Wissenschaften, Frankfurt / Berlin / Bern / Bruxelles / New York, Oxford / Wien 2007, Tilo Medeks Todesfuge (1966), p. 165–169
- Oliver Alt: Tilo Medeks Lieder mit Gitarrenbegleitung. In: Gitarre aktuell, Year 29, Gak No. 101-II/08, Gak No. 102- III/08III, Gak No.103- IV/08, Year 30. Gak No. 105-II/09
- Roland Hafen: Wassermusik – zwei zeitgenössische Komponisten. In: musik impulse journal, 21/08, Helbling Verlag, Esslingen / Innsbruck 2008 (Sinfonie Nr. 2, Rheinische)
- Ulrike Liedtke: über die "kleinen Unterwanderungen" ostdeutscher Komponisten in der Zeit der DDR, Musik im stillen Widerstand. In: Musikforum, 4/2009 (editorial)
- Hans Pölkow: Musik aus der Kraft der verdichteten Sprache. Zum Tod des Komponisten Tilo Medek. In: Berliner Zeitung, 9 February 2006
