= Marcel Landers =

German footballer (born 1984)

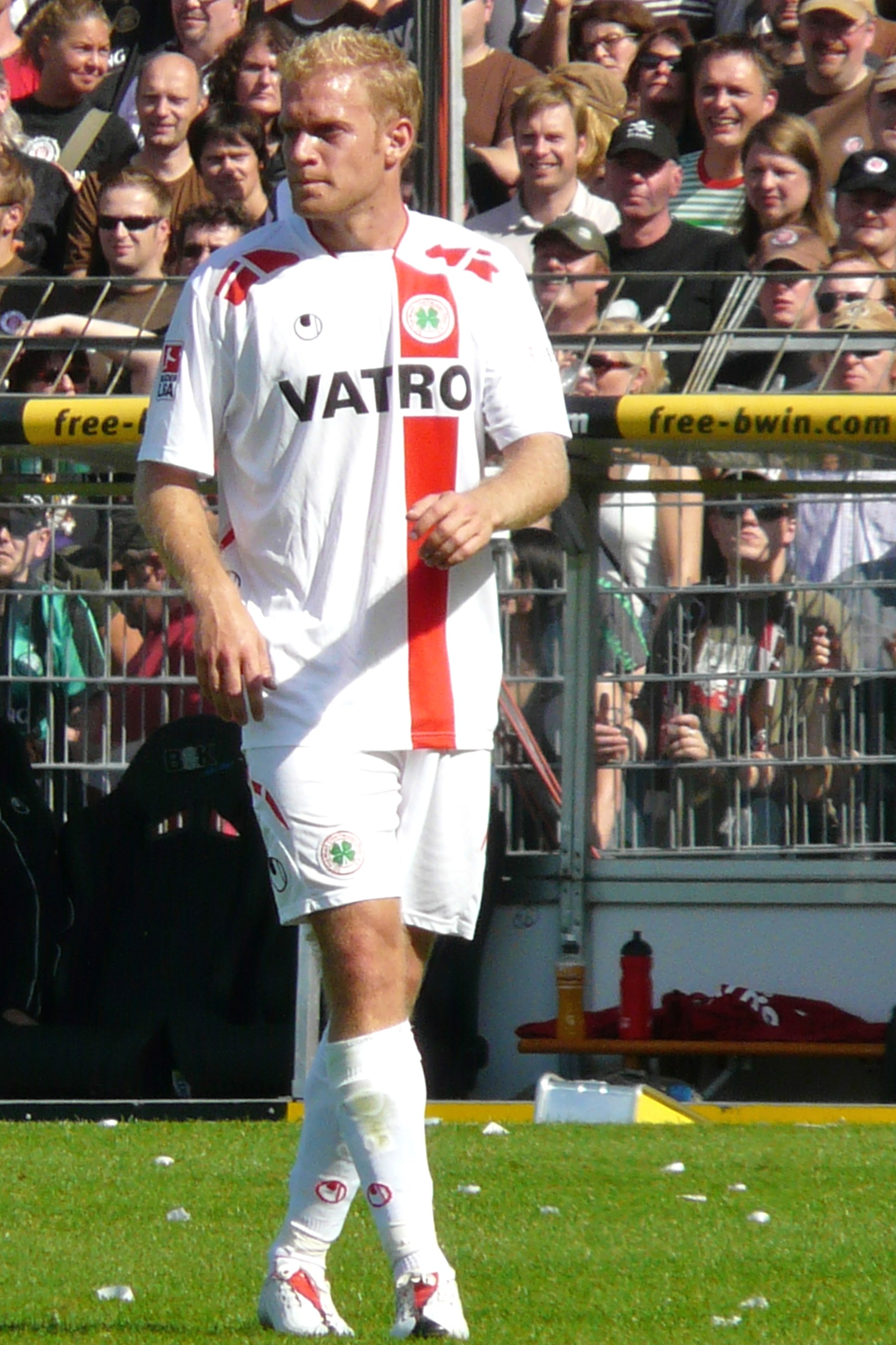
- Landers in 2008

Personal information
- Date of birth: 24 August 1984 (age 42)
- Place of birth: Oberhausen, West Germany
- Height: 1.83 m (6 ft 0 in)
- Position: Defender

Team information
- Current team: Arminia Klosterhardt (Head coach)

Youth career
- 1987–2005: Rot-Weiß Oberhausen

Senior career*
Years	Team	Apps	(Gls)
2005–2011	Rot-Weiß Oberhausen II	40	(0)
2005–2011	Rot-Weiß Oberhausen	129	(1)
2011–2013	Wuppertaler SV Borussia	51	(8)
2013–2014	Rot-Weiß Oberhausen	45	(3)
2014–2015	Rot-Weiß Oberhausen II	35	(2)
2014–2015	Arminia Klosterhardt	25	(4)
2014–2015	Rot-Weiß Oberhausen-Team 12	2	(0)

Managerial career
- 2017: Arminia Klosterhardt (player-assistant)
- 2019–: Arminia Klosterhardt
- * Club domestic league appearances and goals

Marcel Landers (born 24 August 1984) is a German former professional footballer who coaches DJK Arminia Klosterhardt.

== Career ==
Born in Oberhausen, North Rhine-Westphalia, Landers began his career at Rot-Weiß Oberhausen. After he had gone through all youth teams, he was promoted to the second team where he played until 2005, before being promoted to the first team that played in the Regionalliga Nord. He made his debut on the professional league level in the 2. Bundesliga for Rot-Weiß Oberhausen on 24 August 2008 when he started a game against FC Ingolstadt 04.

After the 2010–11 season for Rot-Weiß Oberhausen ended with relegation to the 3. Liga, Landers signed a two-year contract with the Regionalliga team Wuppertaler SV in June 2011. In January 2013, he terminated his contract there and returned to Rot-Weiß Oberhausen. For the 2014–15 season, he was captain of the Oberhausen U-23 reserve. In January 2016 he joined the national league club DJK Arminia Klosterhardt. In April 2017, he was also appointed player-assistant coach under new head coach Michael Lorenz. At the end of the season, he continued as a youth coach for the club. On 27 May 2019, he was promoted as the club's new head coach.
