= Doris Runge =

German writer (born 1943)

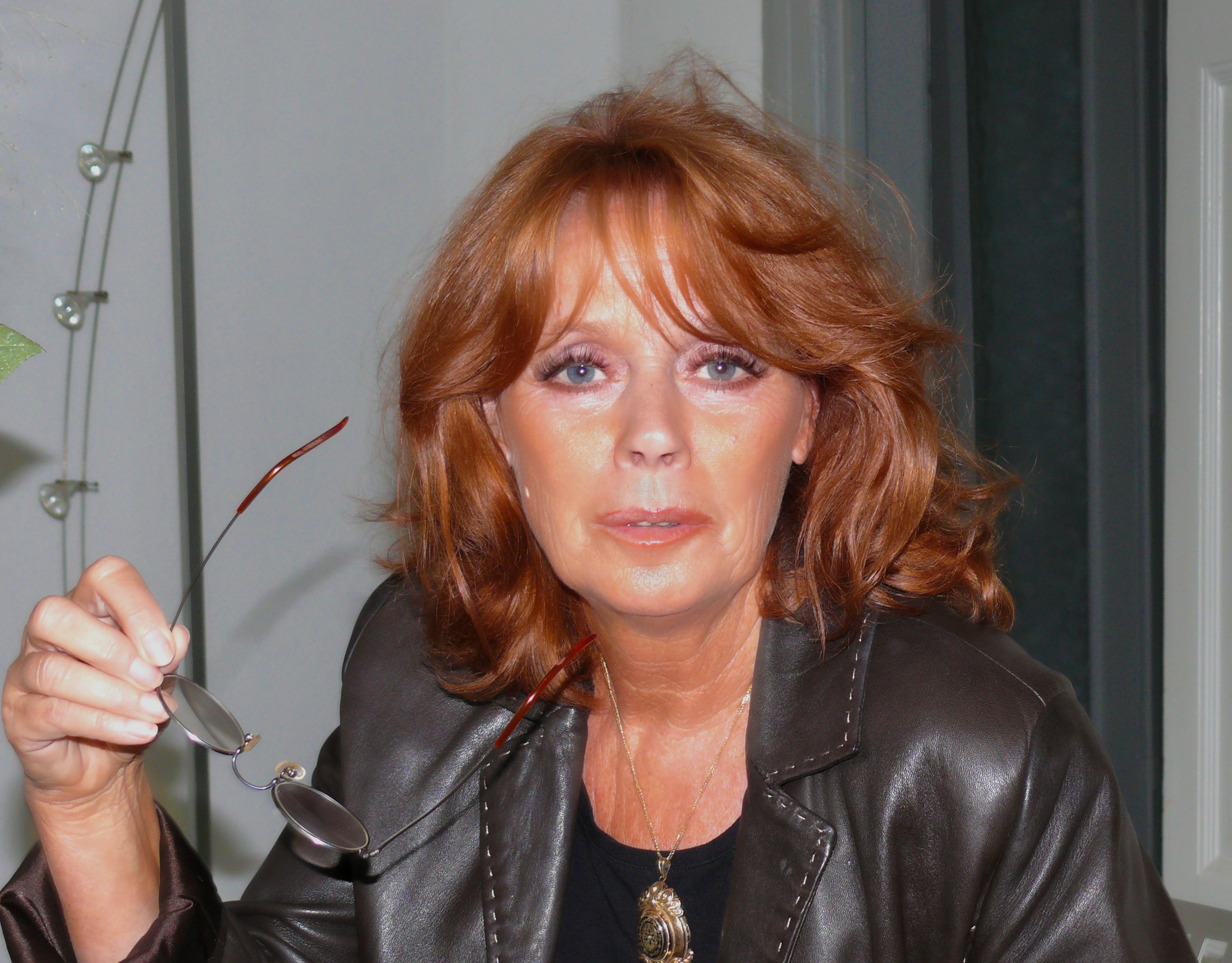
- Born: July 15, 1943 (age 83); Carlow, Germany

Doris Runge (born July 15, 1943, in Carlow) is a German writer.

She was the daughter of a manufacturer whose business was expropriated after World War II. Her family moved to Neukirchen in Schleswig-Holstein in 1953, and she attended schools in Oldenburg and Lübeck before studying in Kiel, where she briefly became a teacher. She married the painter Jürgen Runge (1929–1992) and they divorced in 1981. They couple used to live partially in Ibiza during the 1970s. Runge moved back to Germany, where she lives in the so-called Weiße Haus (White House) in Cismar, Holstein. There she organizes readings with important contemporary authors. Runge has been continuously publishing poetry books since 1981. She has an international standing (translations into Portuguese, American and Czech).

== Prizes ==
- 1985, Friedrich-Hebbel-Preis for Jagdlied
- 1997, Friedrich-Hölderlin-Preis
- 1998, Kunstpreis des Landes Schleswig-Holstein
- 1998, Poetry Liliencron Lecturer University of Kiel
- 1999, Poetik-Professur an der Universität Bamberg
- 2007, Ida-Dehmel-Literaturpreis
- 2009, Honorary Professor in Schleswig-Holstein

== Works ==
- Kunst-Märchen, Berlin, 1977
- Liedschatten, Cismar, 1981
- Jagdlied, Stuttgart, 1985
- Der Vogel, der morgens singt, Cork, 1985
- Kommt Zeit, Stuttgart, 1988
- Wintergrün, Stuttgart, 1991
- Grund genug, Stuttgart, 1995
- Welch ein Weib ! , Stuttgart, 1998
- Trittfeste Schatten, Stuttgart, 2000
- Du also, Munich, 2003
- Die Dreizehnte, Munich, 2007
- Was da auftaucht. Gedichte, Deutsche Verlagsanstalt, Munich 2010, ISBN 978-3-421-04485-3
- Zwischen Tür und Engel, Deutsche Verlagsanstalt, Munich 2013, ISBN 978-3-421-04584-3
- man könnte sich ins blau verlieben, Wallstein Verlag, Göttingen 2017, ISBN 978-3-8353-3044-3
