= Oberhausen =

- City
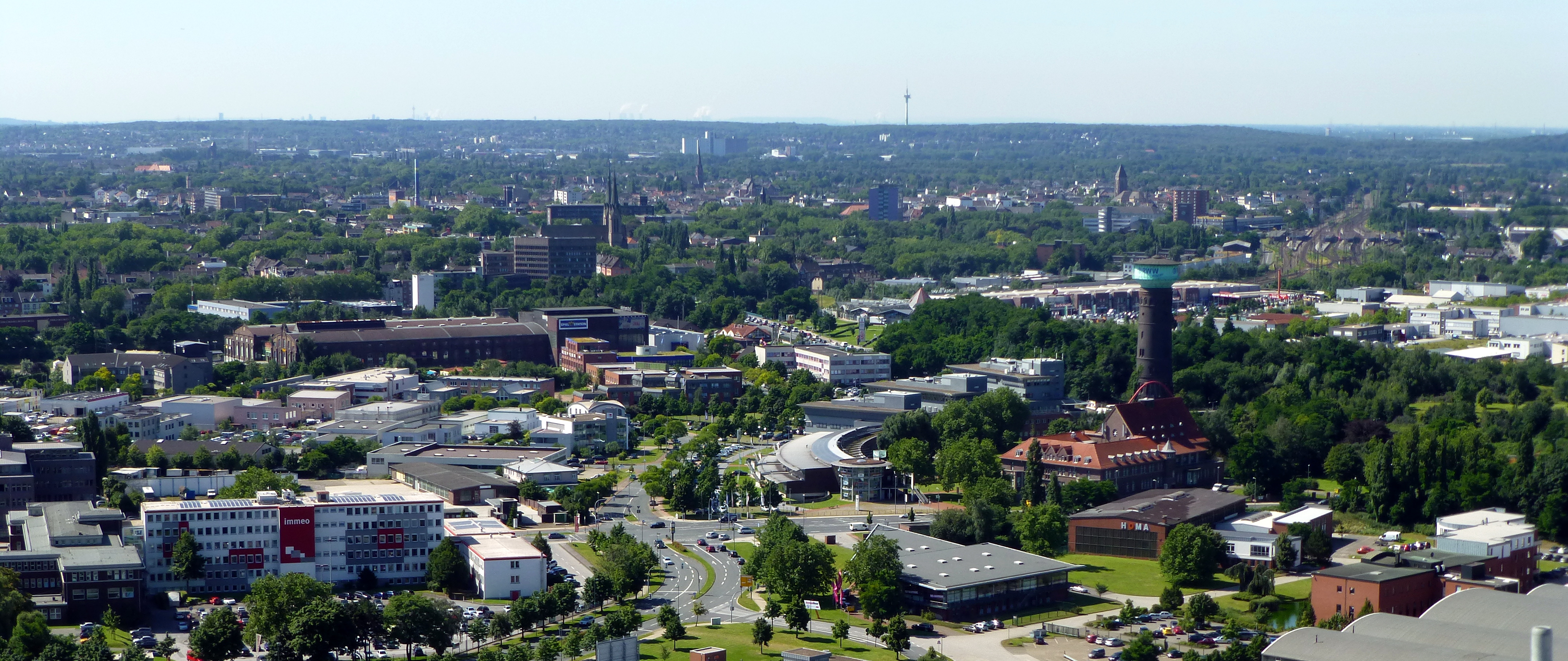
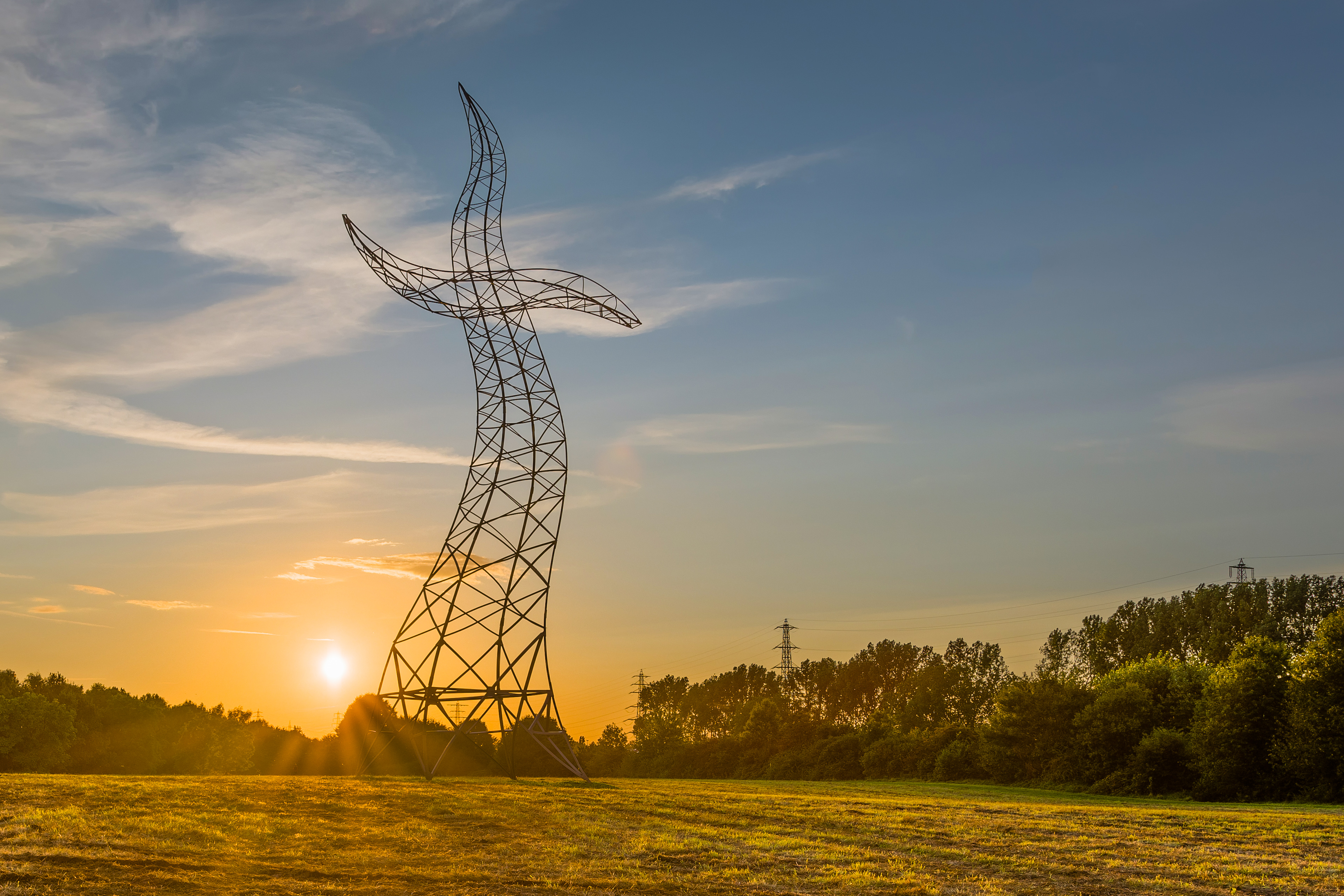
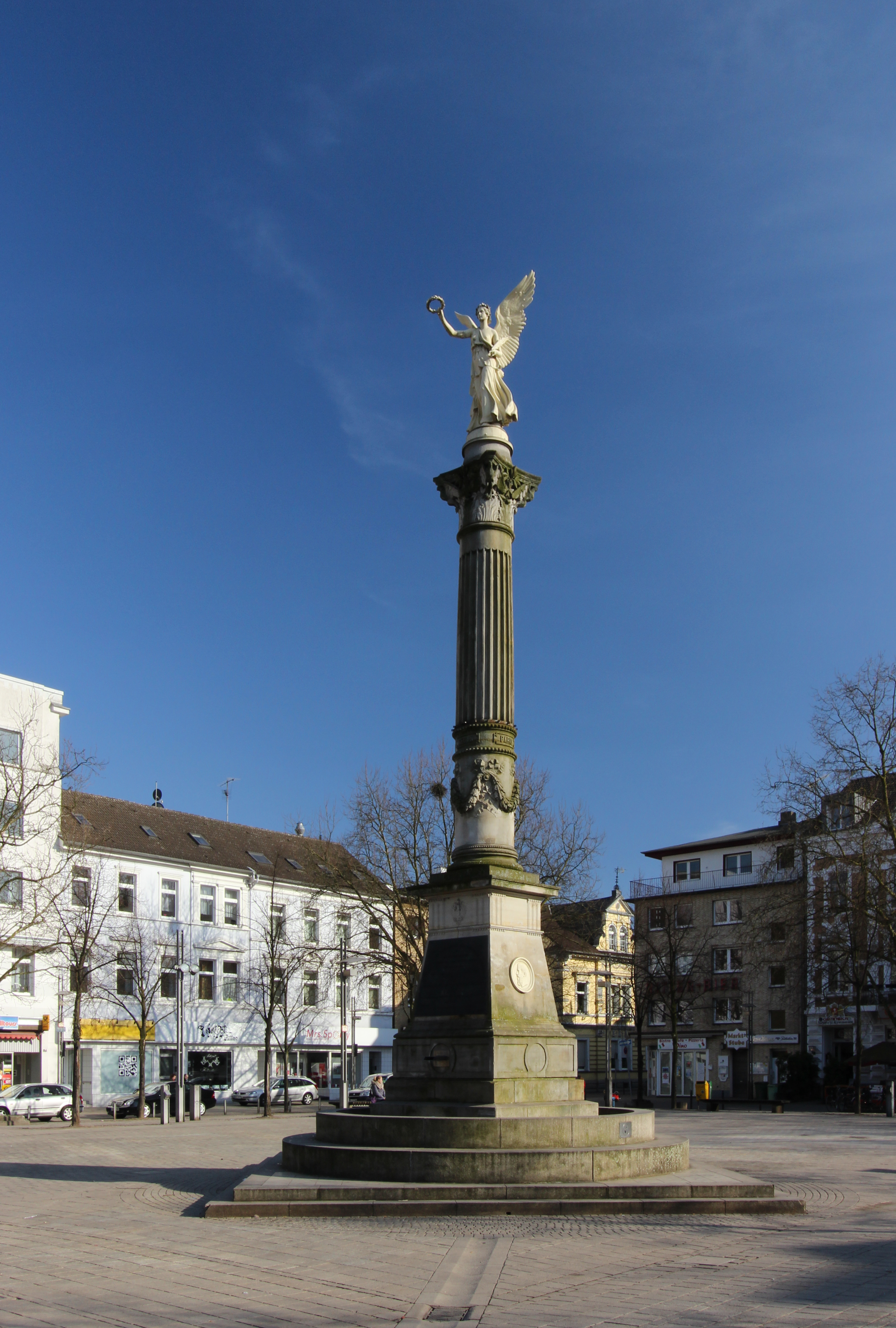
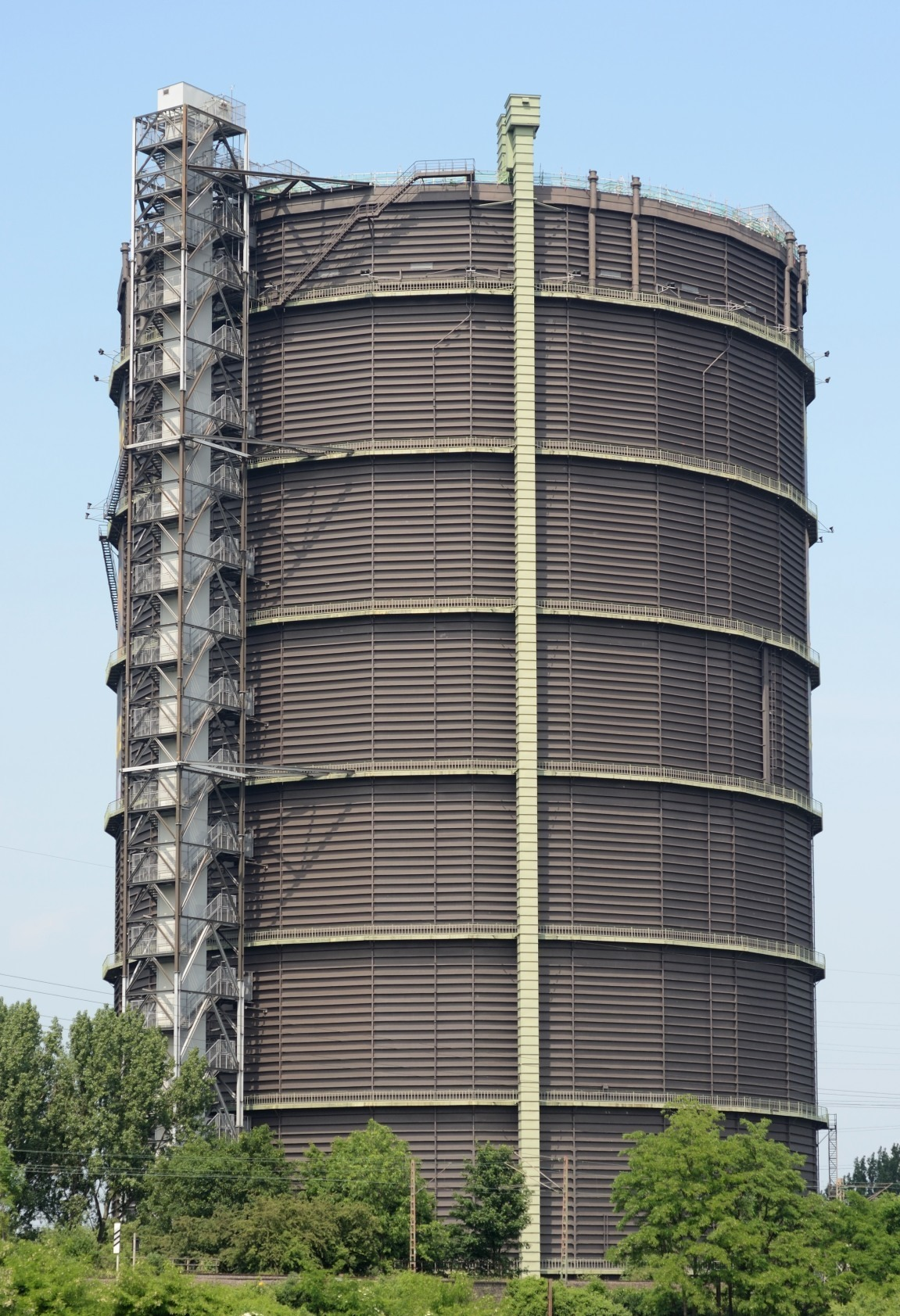
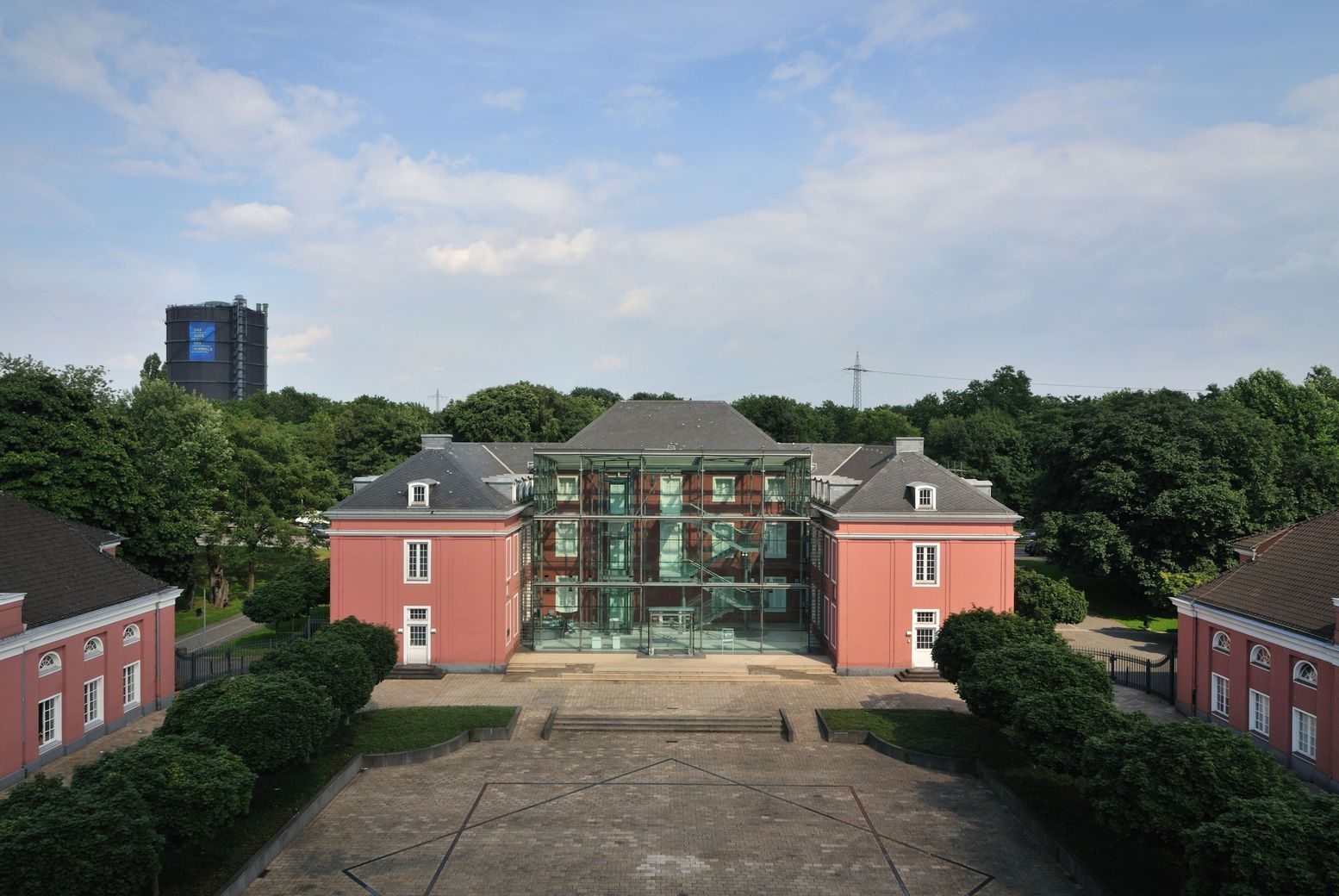
- View over Oberhausen Zauberlehrling Altmarkt Oberhausen Gasometer Schloss Oberhausen

- Flag Coat of arms
- Interactive map of Oberhausen
- Location within Germany Location within North Rhine-Westphalia
- Coordinates: 51°29′48″N 06°52′14″E
- Country: Germany
- State: North Rhine-Westphalia
- Admin. region: Düsseldorf
- District: Urban district

Government
  - Mayor (2025–30): Thorsten Berg (SPD)

Area
  - Total: 77.09 km^{2} (29.76 sq mi)
- Elevation: 78 m (256 ft)

Population (2025-12-31)
  - Total: 213,178
  - Density: 2,765/km^{2} (7,162/sq mi)
- Time zone: UTC+01:00 (CET)
  - Summer (DST): UTC+02:00 (CEST)
- Postal codes: 46001-46149
- Dialling codes: 0208
- Vehicle registration: OB
- Website: City of Oberhausen (de)

Oberhausen (/ˈoʊbərhaʊzən/; German: [ˈoːbɐhaʊzn̩]) is a city on the river Emscher in the Ruhr Area, Germany, located between Duisburg and Essen (c. 13 km or 8 mi). The city hosts the International Short Film Festival Oberhausen and The Static Roots Festival. Its Gasometer Oberhausen is an anchor point of the European Route of Industrial Heritage.

== History ==
Oberhausen was named for its 1847 railway station which had taken its name from the Oberhausen Castle. The new borough was formed in 1862 following inflow of people for the local coal mines and steel mills. Awarded town rights in 1874, Oberhausen absorbed several neighbouring boroughs including Alstaden, parts of Styrum and Dümpten in 1910. Oberhausen became a city in 1901, and they incorporated the towns of Sterkrade and Osterfeld in 1929. The Ruhrchemie AG synthetic oil plant ("Oberhausen-Holten" or "Sterkrade/Holten") was a bombing target of the oil campaign of World War II, and the US forces reached the plant by 4 April 1945.

In 1973, Thyssen AG employed 14,000 people in Oberhausen in the steel industry, but ten years later the number had fallen to 6,000.

In 1954 the city began hosting the International Short Film Festival Oberhausen, and the 1982 Deutscher Filmpreis was awarded to a group that wrote the Oberhausen Manifesto.

== Demographics ==
Population development since 1862:

Historical population

Year	Pop.	±% p.a.
1862	5,590	—
1871	12,805	+9.65%
1900	42,148	+4.19%
1910	89,900	+7.87%
1919	98,677	+1.04%
1925	105,121	+1.06%
1933	192,345	+7.84%
1939	191,842	−0.04%
1950	202,808	+0.51%
1961	256,773	+2.17%
1965	258,249	+0.14%
1970	246,199	−0.95%

Year	Pop.	±% p.a.
1975	237,147	−0.75%
1980	228,952	−0.70%
1985	222,666	−0.56%
1990	223,840	+0.11%
1995	224,397	+0.05%
2000	222,151	−0.20%
2005	218,898	−0.29%
2010	212,945	−0.55%
2015	210,934	−0.19%
2020	209,566	−0.13%
2025	213,178	+0.34%

Population size may be affected by changes in administrative divisions. Source: Landesdatabank Nordrhein-Westfalen (1965-2025)

The age breakdown of the population (2013) was:

<18 years	15.6%
18–64 years	63.3%
>64 years	21.1%

There were 12.5% non-Germans living in Oberhausen, as of 2014.

The unemployment rate is 10.4% (Jul 2020).

Migrant communities in Oberhausen as of 31 December 2017:

Turkey	8,560
Syria	2,315
Serbia	2,090
Italy	2,005
Poland	1,840
Bosnia and Herzegovina	1,530
Greece	1,346
Croatia	1,209
North Macedonia	865
Sri Lanka	673

== Politics ==
=== Mayor ===
The current mayor of Oberhausen is Thorsten Berg of the Social Democratic Party (SPD), elected in 2025.

The previous mayoral election was held on 13 September 2020, with a runoff held on 27 September, and the results were as follows:

Candidate	Party	First round		Second round	
Candidate	Party	Votes	%	Votes	%
Daniel Schranz	Christian Democratic Union	30,150	45.5	28,456	62.1
Thorsten Berg	Social Democratic Party	19,699	29.7	17,381	37.9
Norbert Emil Axt	Alliance 90/The Greens	7,002	10.6		
Wolfgang Kempkes	Alternative for Germany	4,521	6.8		
Jens Carstensen	The Left	3,095	4.7		
Urban Mülhausen	Open for Citizens	1,378	2.1		
Claudia Wädlich	The Violets	468	0.7		
Valid votes		66,313	98.7	45,837	99.2
Invalid votes		859	1.3	368	0.8
Total		67,172	100.0	46,205	100.0
Electorate/voter turnout		159,510	42.1	159,458	29.0
Source: State Returning Officer

=== City council ===
Results of the 2020 city council election

The Oberhausen city council governs the city alongside the mayor. The most recent city council election was held on 13 September 2020, and the results were as follows:

Party	Votes	%	+/-	Seats	+/-
Christian Democratic Union (CDU)	21,471	32.8	▼0.2	19	▼1
Social Democratic Party (SPD)	20,754	31.7	▼7.2	19	▼4
Alliance 90/The Greens (Grüne)	9,450	14.4	▲5.9	8	▲3
Alternative for Germany (AfD)	4,995	7.6	New	4	New
The Left (Die Linke)	3,367	5.1	▼2.8	3	▼2
Free Democratic Party (FDP)	1,988	3.0	▲0.2	2	±0
Alliance of Obenhauser Citizens (BOB)	1,913	2.9	▼5.7	2	▼3
Open for Citizens (OfB)	1,153	1.8	New	1	New
The Violets (Die Violetten)	445	0.7	▲0.5	0	±0
Valid votes	65,536	98.1			
Invalid votes	1,290	1.9			
Total	66,826	100.0		58	▼2
Electorate/voter turnout	159,510	41.9	▼0.9		
Source: State Returning Officer

== Sport ==
Oberhausen is home to Regionalliga West football team Rot-Weiß Oberhausen, who play at the Niederrheinstadion situated on the banks of the Rhine–Herne Canal.

The city had a professional ice hockey team between 1997 and 2007, the Revierlöwen Oberhausen. The team initially played at the Arena Oberhausen when playing in the top-flight Deutsche Eishockey Liga but later moved to the Emscher-Lippe-Halle in Gelsenkirchen following financial woes.

The Rudolf Weber-Arena has hosted many international indoor sporting events including MMA event UFC 122 in 2010 and the PDC Unibet European Championship of darts in 2020.

The city has established itself as a popular destination for professional wrestling in Germany, with Gelsenkirchen-based promotion Westside Xtreme Wrestling (wXw) regularly running shows in Oberhausen's Turbinenhalle. wXw's 16 Carat Gold Tournament is considered one of the most prestigious independent wrestling tournaments in the world and is held in March every year in Oberhausen - attracting fans from around the world.

== Transport ==
The nearest airport is Düsseldorf Airport, located 33 km (21 mi) south of Oberhausen (25 minutes drive).

The main train station is Oberhausen Hauptbahnhof.

== Twin towns – sister cities ==
Oberhausen is twinned with:

- Middlesbrough, England, United Kingdom (1974)
- Zaporizhzhia, Ukraine (1986)
- Freital, Germany (1990)
- Carbonia, Italy (2002)
- Iglesias, Italy (2002)
- Mersin, Turkey (2004)
- Tychy, Poland (2020)

== Notable people ==
- Georg Schaltenbrand (1897–1979), author, neurologist and multiple sclerosis specialist
- Martha Schneider-Bürger (1903–2001), civil engineer and author
- Reni Erkens (1909–1987), swimmer
- Wilhelm Brinkmann (1910–1991), field handball player
- Erich Kempka (1910–1975), SS-officer and Adolf Hitler's driver
- Werner Töniges (1910–1995), naval officer
- Willy Jürissen (1912–1990), footballer
- Édouard Wawrzyniak (1912–1991), French footballer
- Will Quadflieg (1914–2003), actor
- Alf Marholm (1918–2006), actor, radio plays, audio books and voice
- Arnulf Zitelmann (1929–2023), writer
- Paul Lange (1931–2016), kayaker, Olympic champion
- Karl-Heinz Feldkamp (born 1934), football player and trainer
- Wilhelm Keim (1934–2018), chemist and professor for technical chemistry
- Theo Vennemann (born 1937), linguist and professor of German and theoretical linguistics
- Siegfried Jerusalem (born 1940), opera singer
- Hans Siemensmeyer (born 1940), football player and coach
- Wolf-Dieter Ahlenfelder (1944–2014), football referee
- Dieter Herzog (1946–2025), footballer
- Tilman Spengler (born 1947), writer and journalist, author and co-editor of the magazine Kursbuch
- Eckhard Stratmann-Mertens (born 1948), teacher and politician (Alliance 90/The Greens), member of Bundestag
- Ditmar Jakobs (born 1953), footballer
- Willi Wülbeck (born 1954), athlete
- Achim Hofer (born 1955), musicologist
- Christoph Klimke (born 1959), writer
- Michael Grosse-Brömer (born 1960), politician (CDU), member of Bundestag
- Christoph Schlingensief (1960–2010), film and theater director, radio play writer and performance artist
- Dirk Balthaus (born 1965), jazz pianist and composer
- Rebecca Immanuel (born 1970), actress
- Esther Schweins (born 1970), actress and comedian
- Markus Feldhoff (born 1974), footballer
- Mark Kleinschmidt (born 1974), rower
- Marcel Landers (born 1984), footballer
- Frederick Cordes (born 1986), politician (SPD)
- Max Meyer (born 1995), footballer
- Davin Herbrüggen (born 1998), singer

== Gallery ==
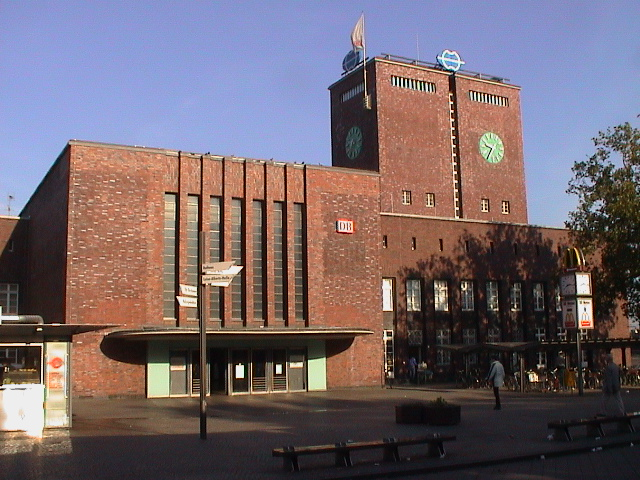
Oberhausen Hauptbahnhof

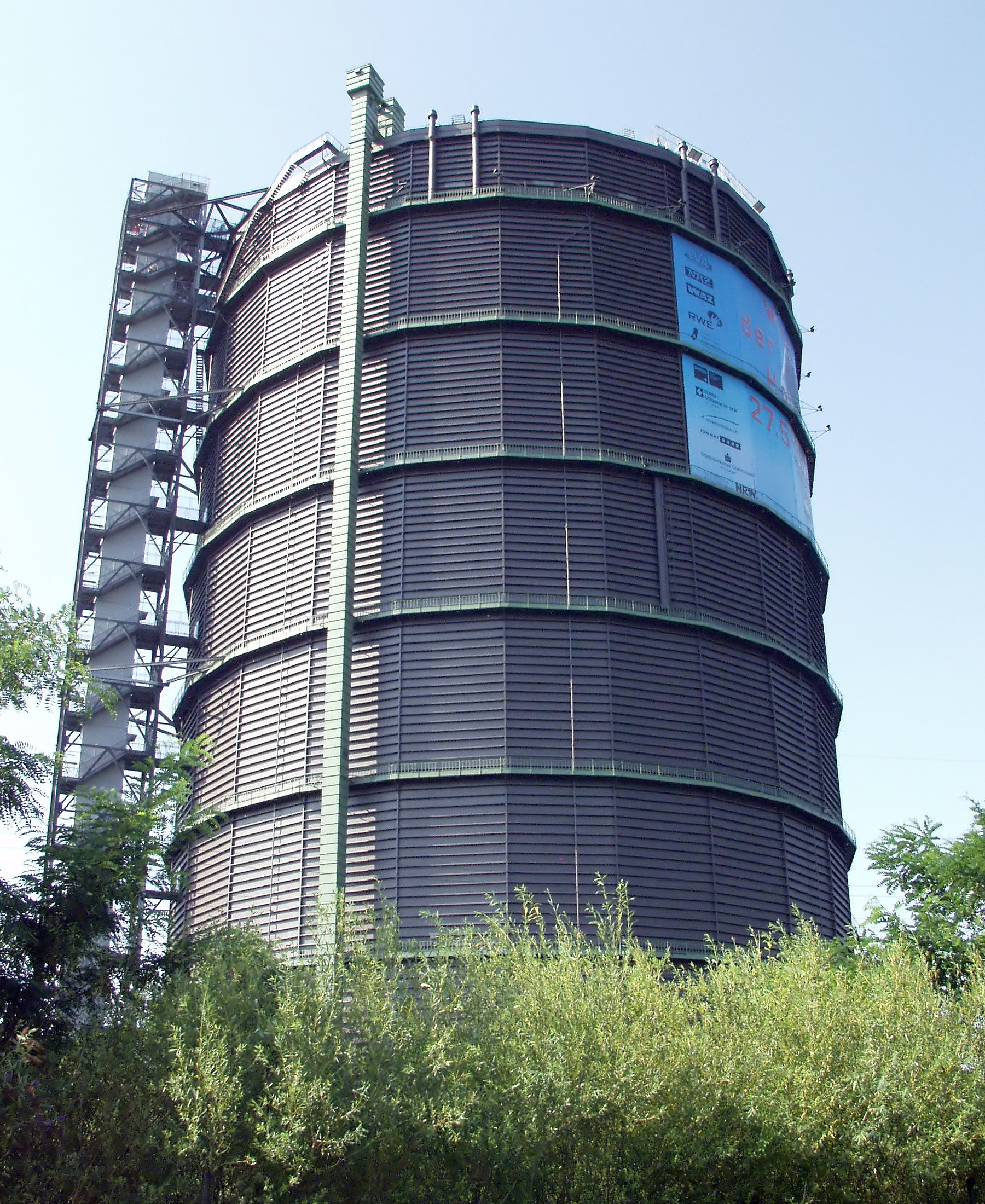
Gasometer

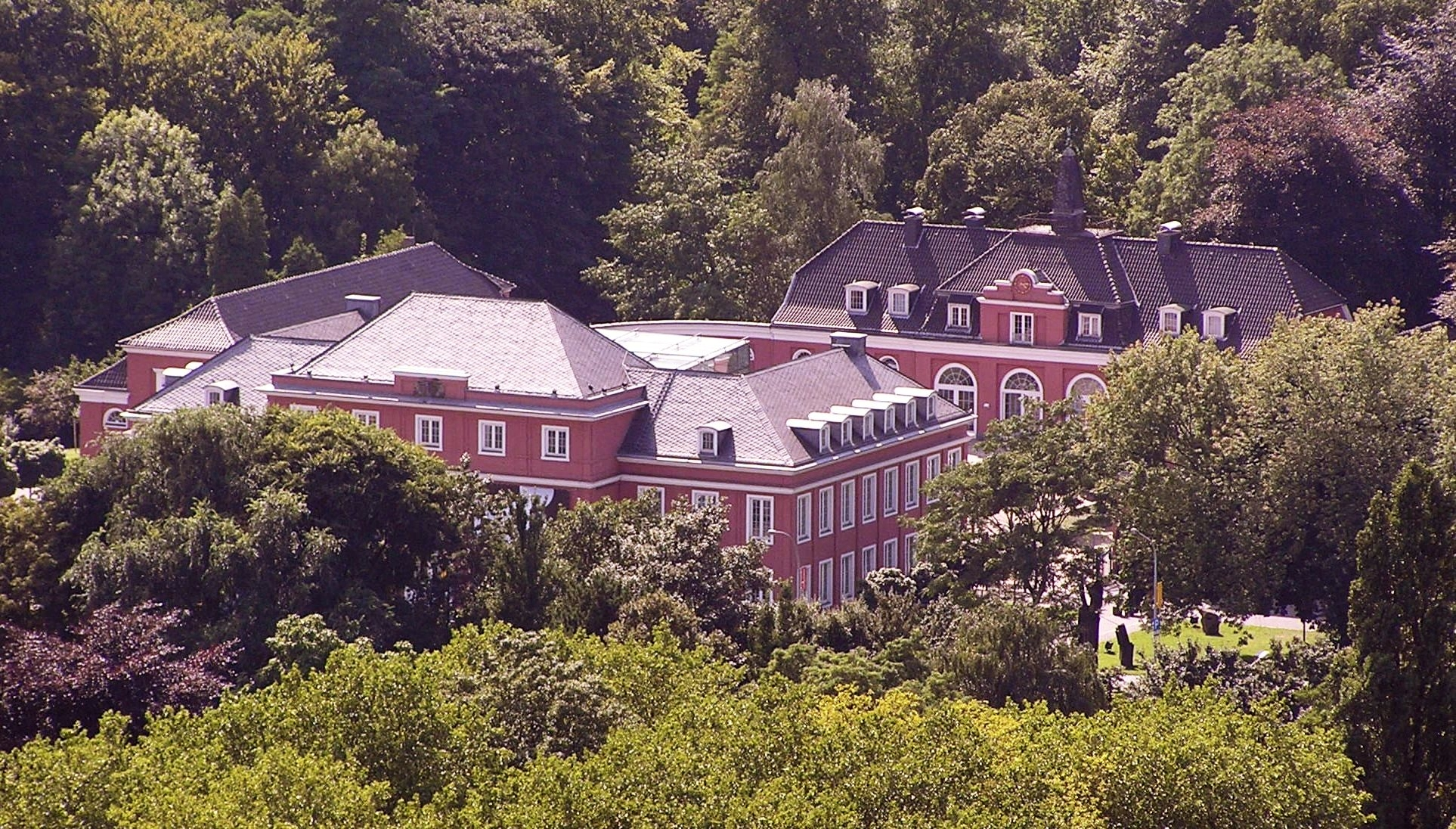
Oberhausen Castle as seen from the Gasometer

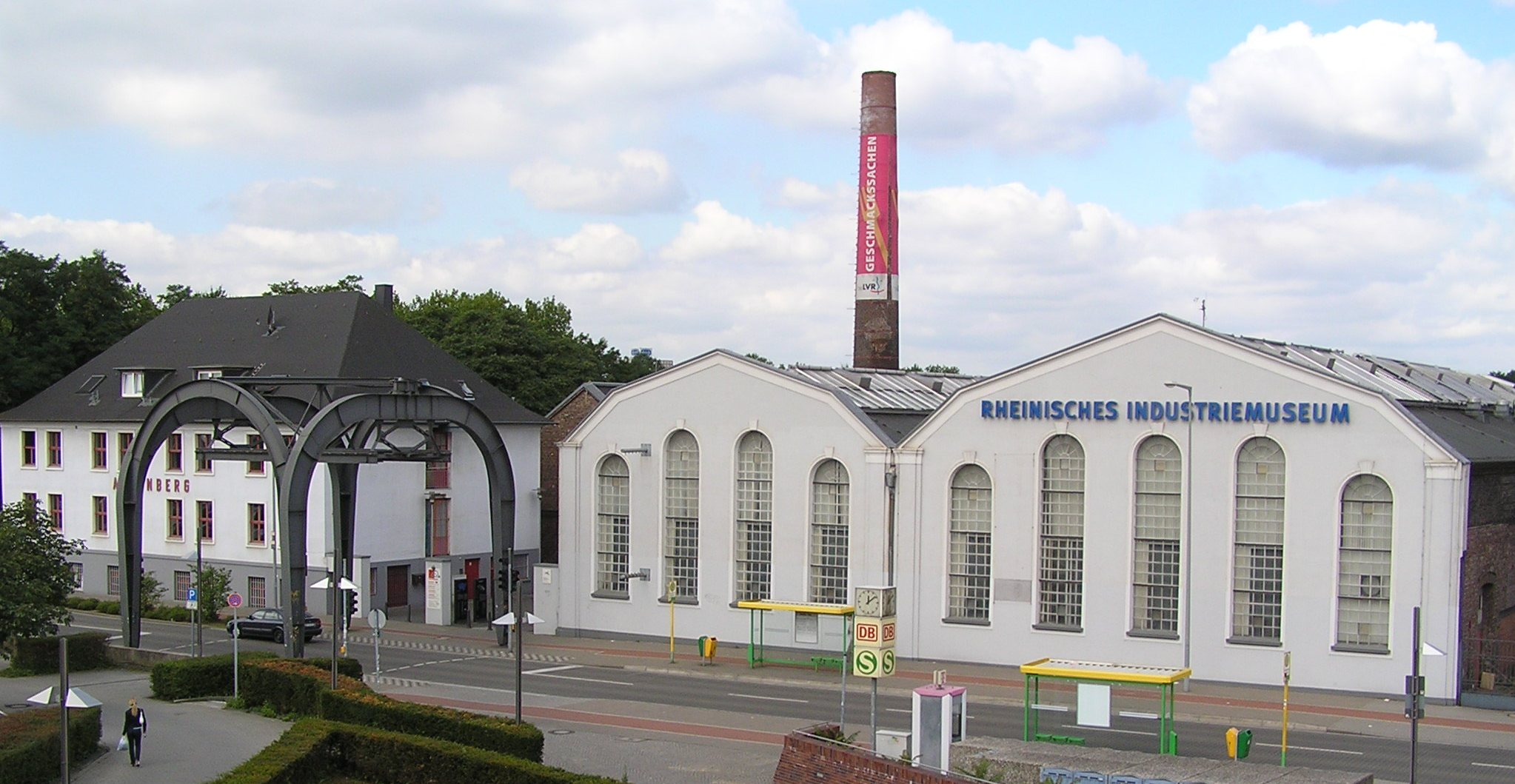
Industrial Museum

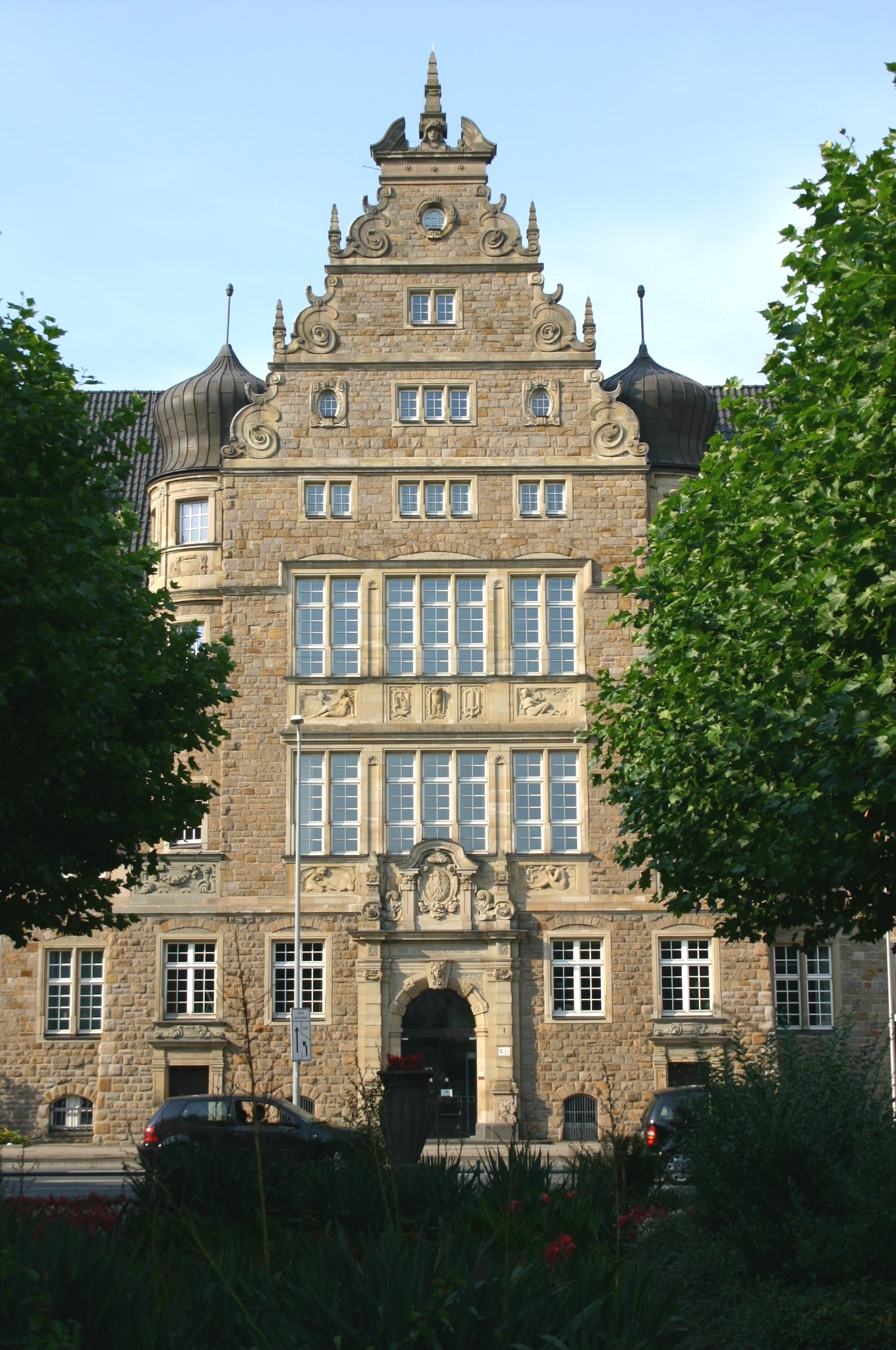
Courthouse

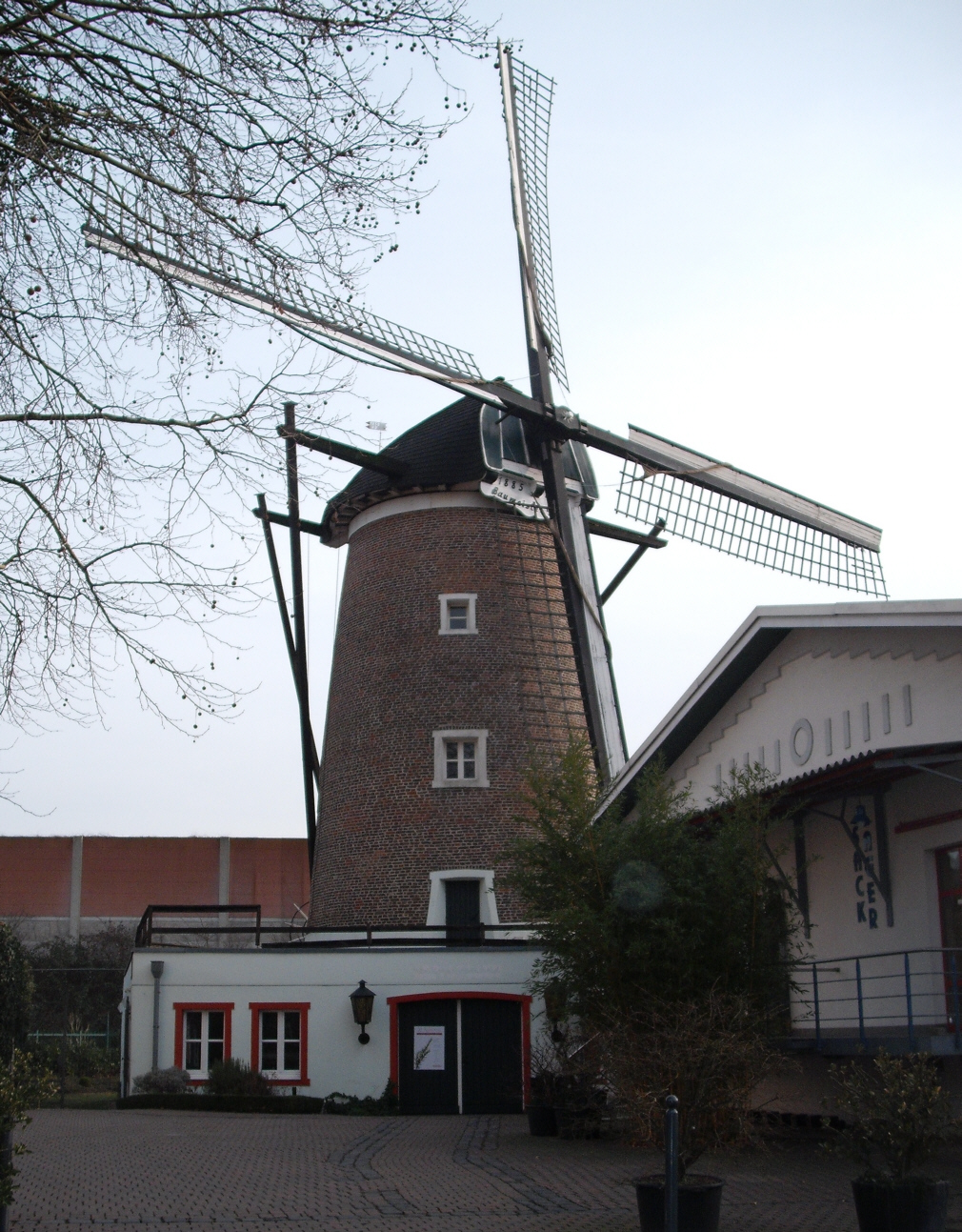
Baumeister-Mill

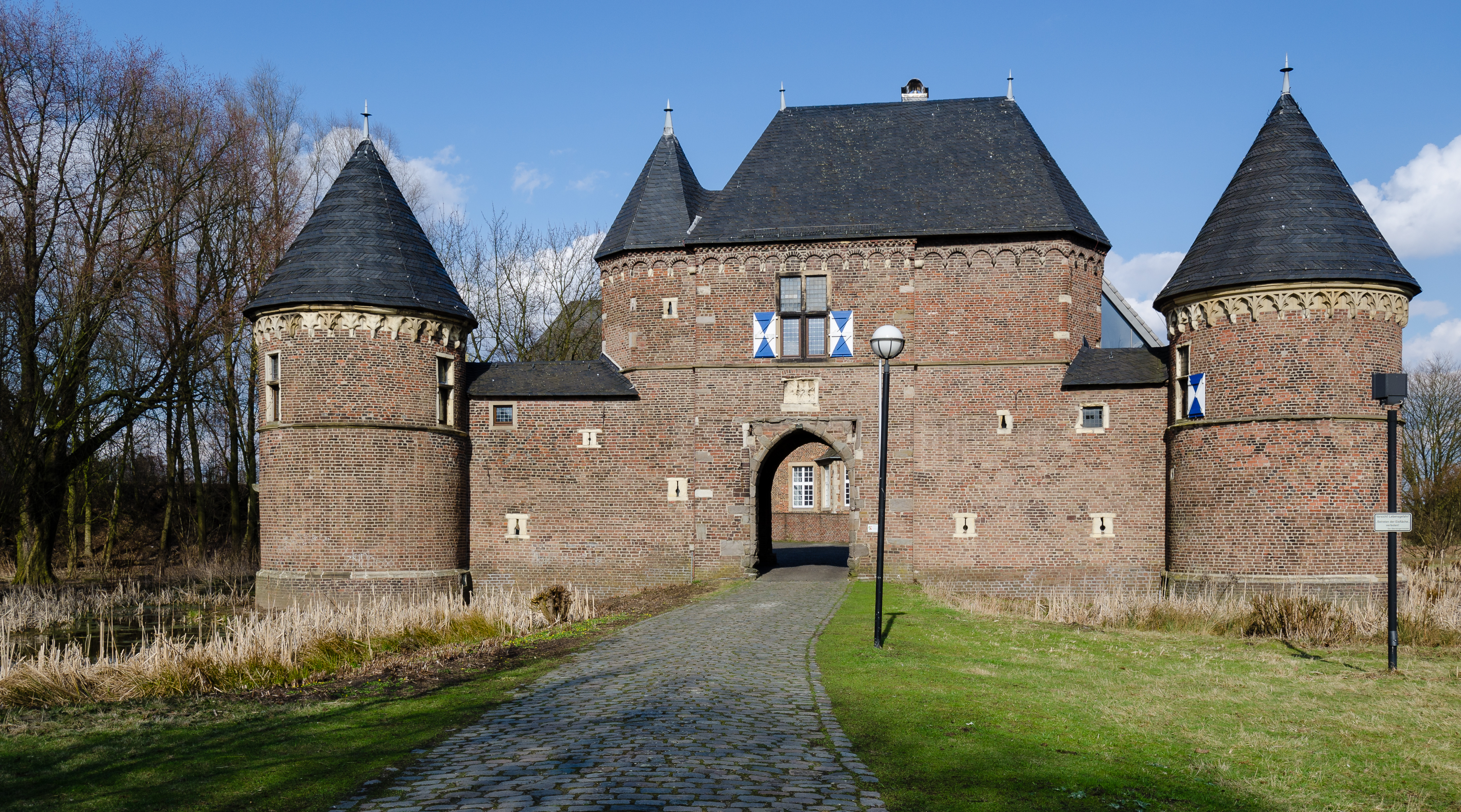
Vondern Castle

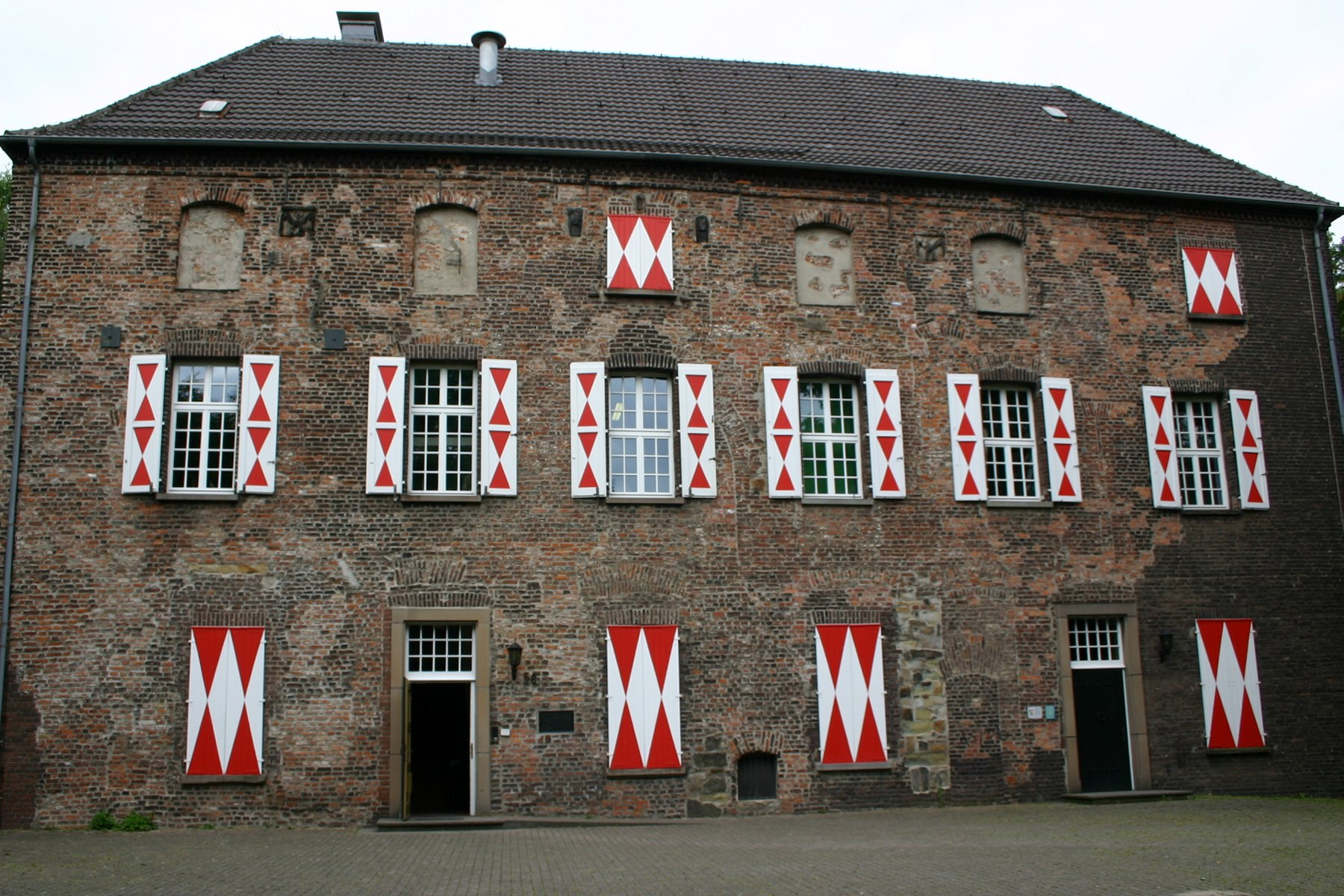
Kastell Holten

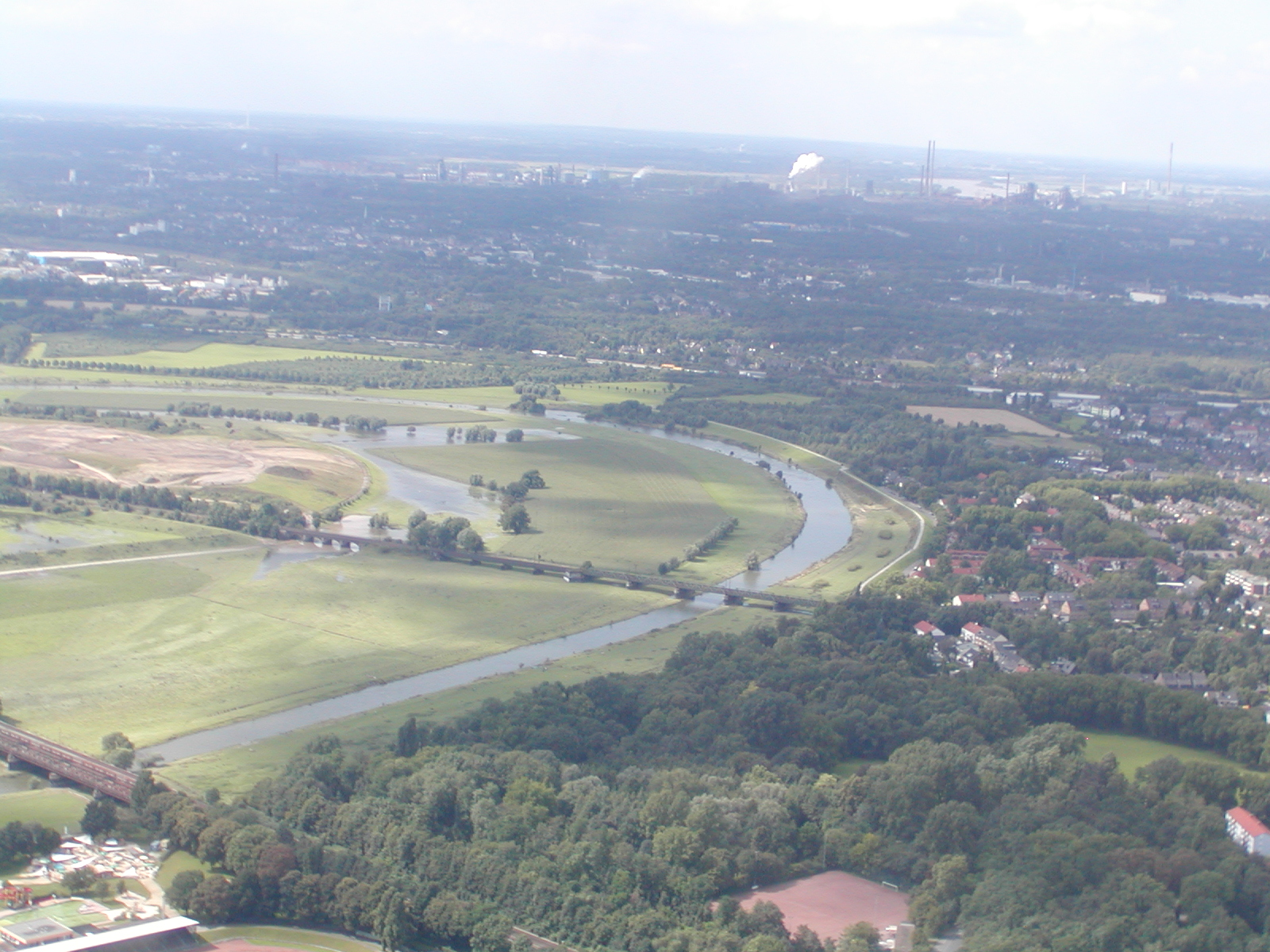
Ruhr meadows in Oberhausen-Alstaden

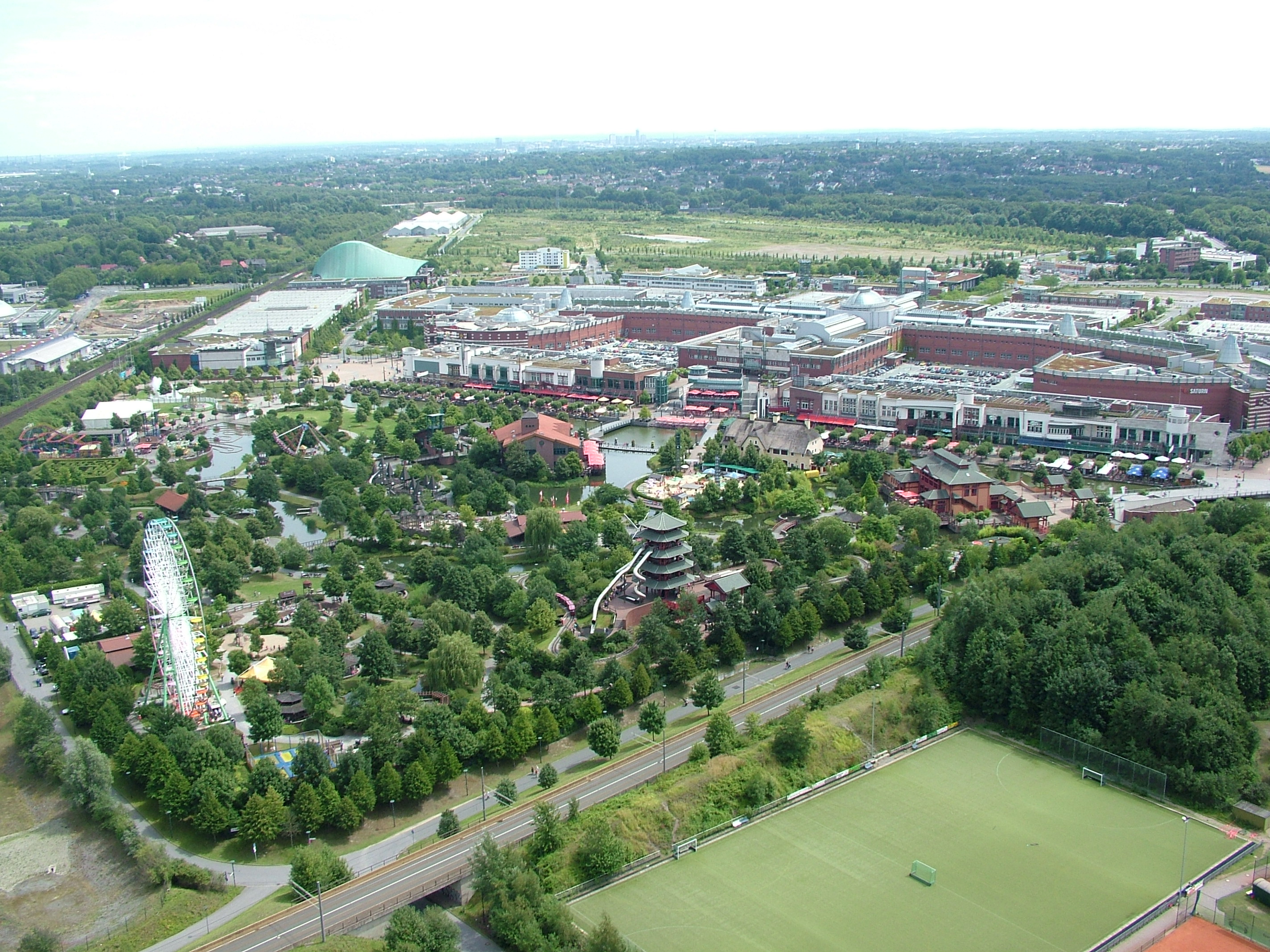
CentrO shopping mall

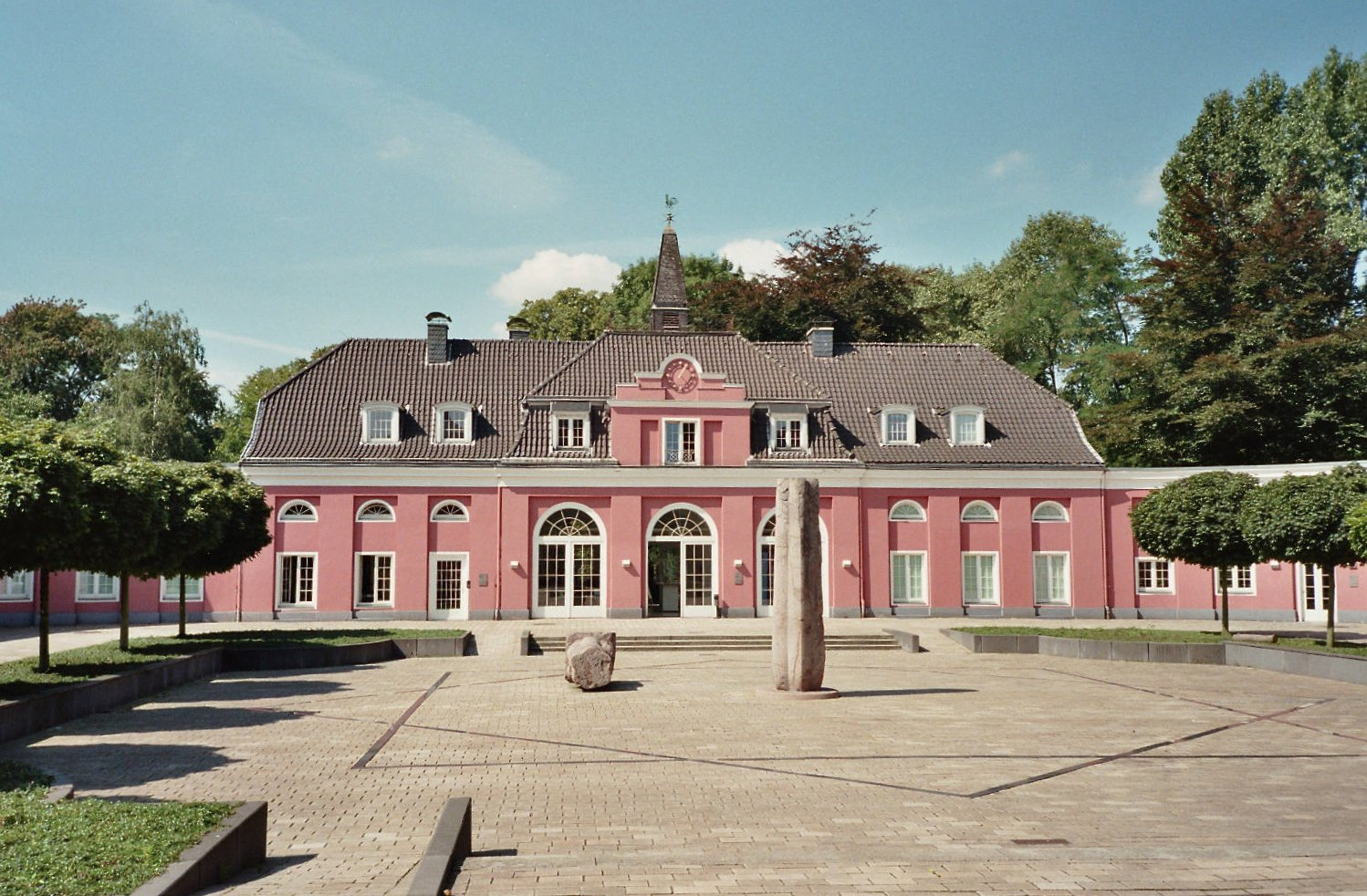
Oberhausen Castle, inner courtyard with the Little castle

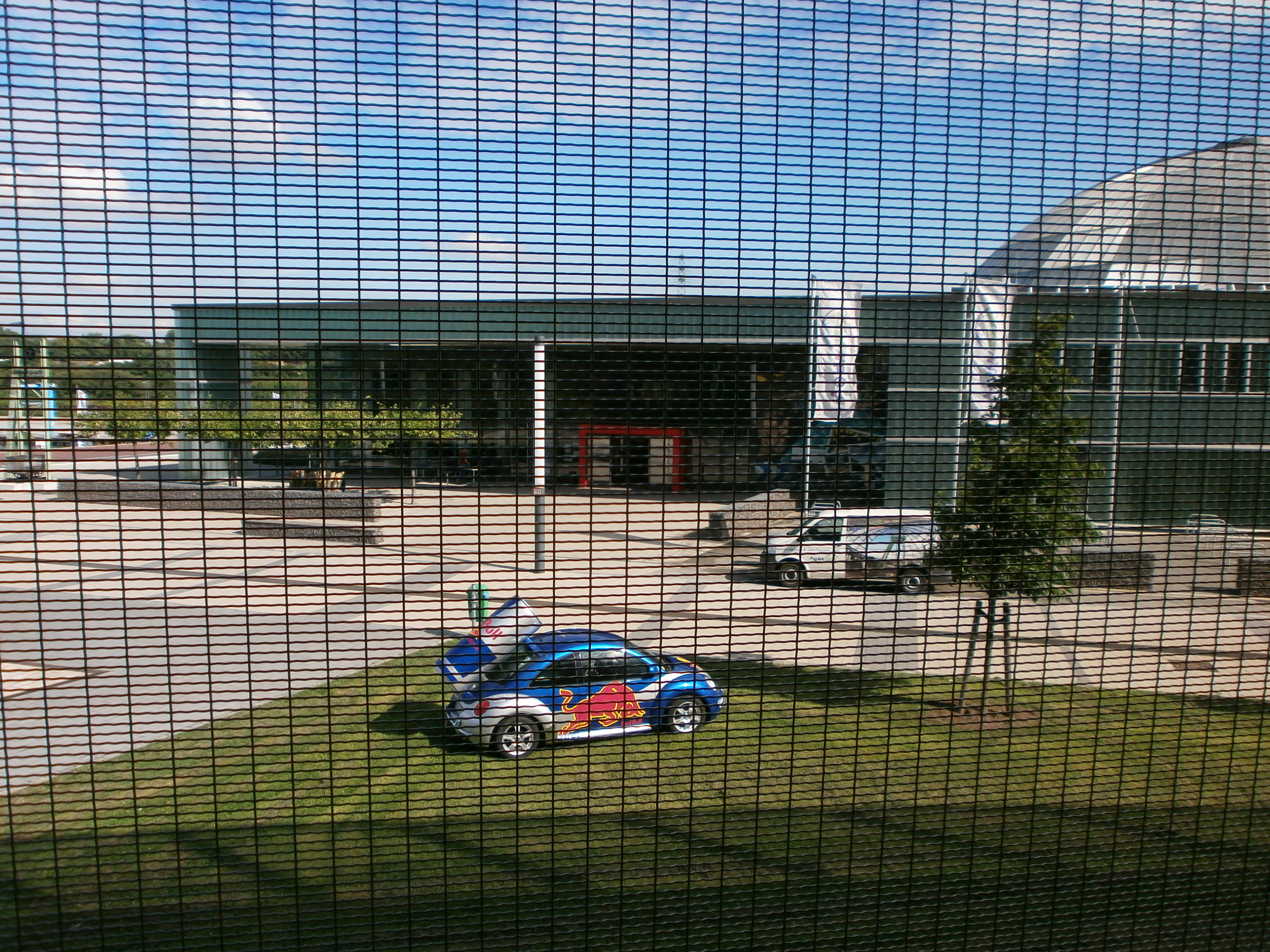
AQUApark near CentrO in 2012

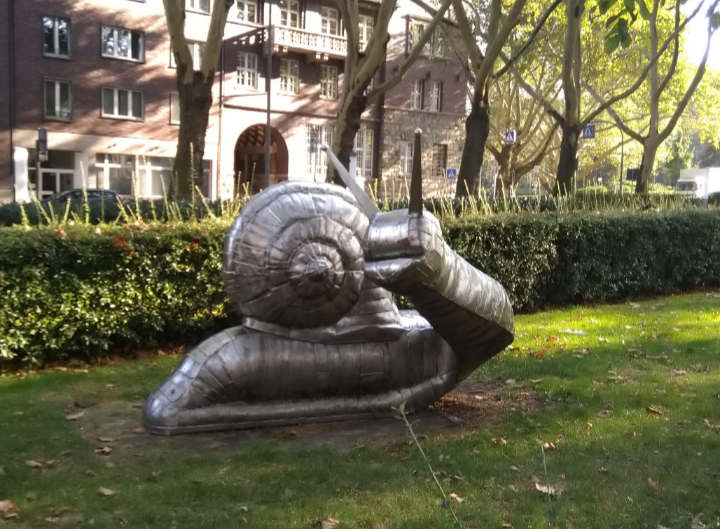
'Shellakabookie' on Schwartzstraße

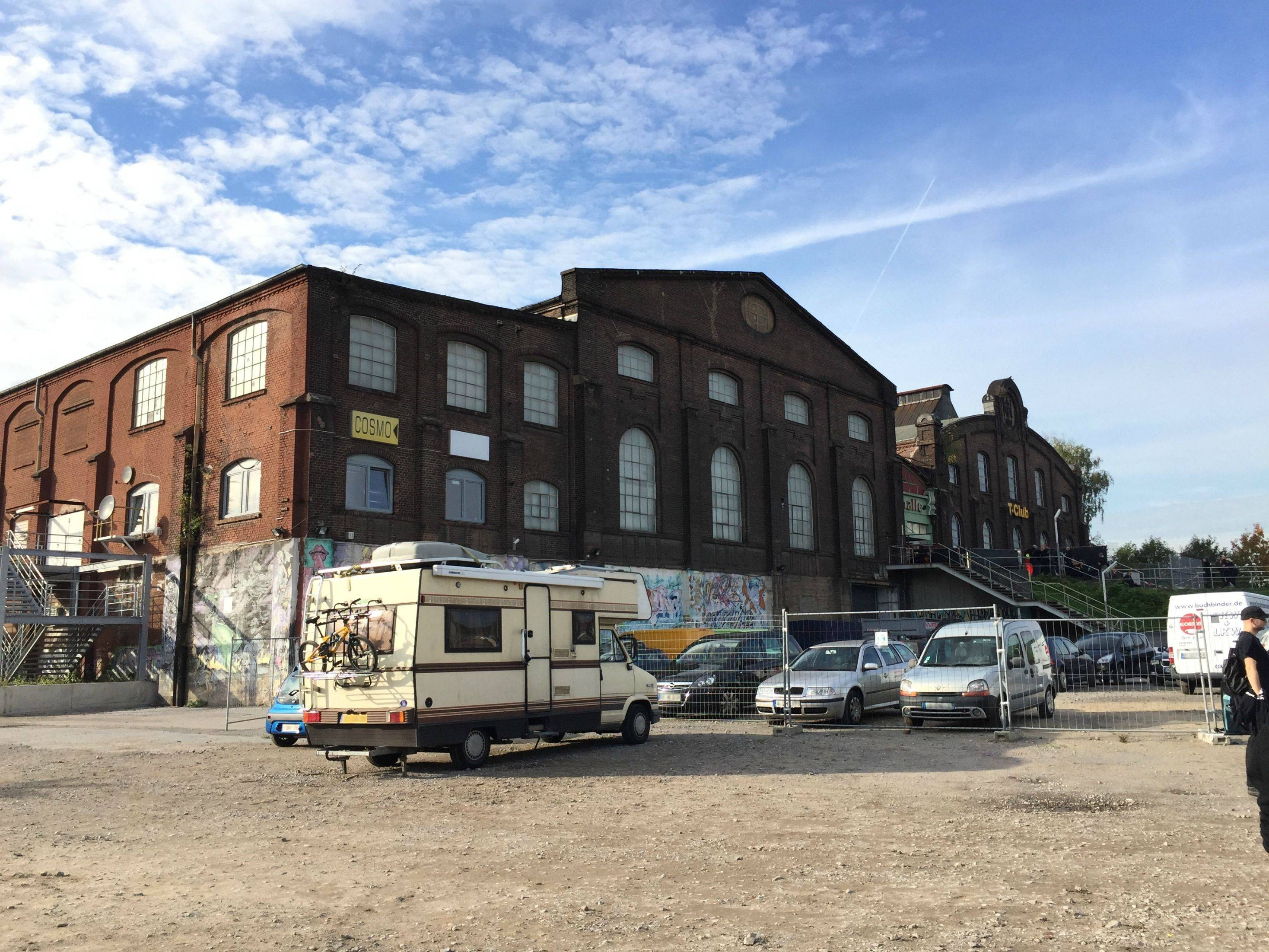
Turbinenhalle Oberhausen

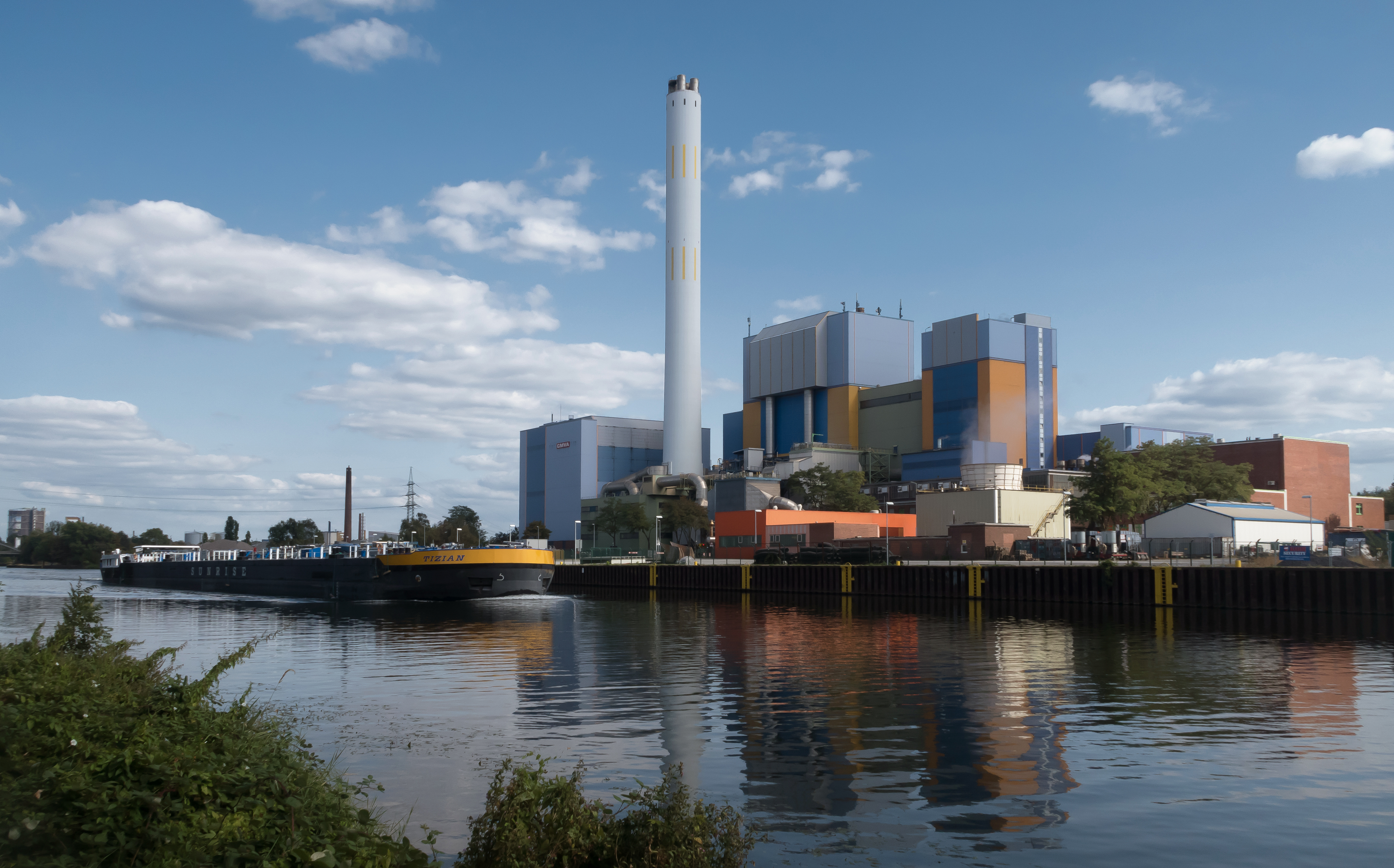
Waste processing company GMVA in Oberhausen
