= Angela Krauß =

- Born: May 2, 1950 (age 76) Chemnitz, Germany
- Occupation: Writer

Angela Krauß or Angela Krauss (born May 2, 1950, in Chemnitz) is a German writer.

== Biography ==
Angela Krauß was born in 1950 in Chemnitz. From 1969 to 1972, she studied advertising economics at the Technical School of Advertising and Design in East Berlin. She then worked in advertising and public relations. From 1976 to 1979, she studied at the Johannes R. Becher Literary Institute in Leipzig, where she has lived as an independent writer since 1981. In 2000, she taught poetry at the University of Paderborn, in 2004 at the Goethe University Frankfurt, and in 2016 at the Faculty of Theology at Humboldt University of Berlin. In 2009, she was awarded the 10-week London scholarship from the German Literature Fund, as Writer-in-Residence at Queen Mary University of London.

=== Memberships ===
Angela Krauß is a member of the PEN Center Germany and the Sächsische Akademie der Künste. Since 2006, she has been a full member of the Academy of Sciences and Literature Mainz and, since 2014, of the Academy of Arts, Berlin.

== Awards and honors ==
- Hans-Marchwitza-Preis (1986)
- Ingeborg Bachmann Prize (1988)
- Stadtschreiber of Graz (1990)
- Promotional award for the Lessing Prize of the Free State of Saxony (1995)
- Berlin Literature Prize (1996)
- Villa Massimo scholarship (1999)
- Gerrit-Engelke-Preis (2000)
- Thomas Valentin Literature Prize (2001)
- Kester-Haeusler Honorary Award from the German Schiller Foundation (2002)
- Scholarship from the Calwer Hermann-Hesse-Foundation (2006)
- Hermann Lenz Prize (2007)
- Rainer-Malkowski Prize (2010)
- Franz Nabl Prize (2011)
- Wilhelm-Müller-Preis (2013)

== Works ==
- Das Vergnügen (The Pleasure). Aufbau-Verlag, Berlin and Weimar 1984
- Das Glashaus (The Glass House), Aufbau-Verlag, Berlin and Weimar 1988
- Der Dienst (The Service). Suhrkamp Verlag, Frankfurt am Main 1990
- Dienst-Jahre und andere Prosa, Aufbau-Verlag, Berlin and Weimar 1991
- Die Überfliegerin. Suhrkamp Verlag, Frankfurt am Main 1995
- Sommer auf dem Eis. Frankfurt am Main 1998
- Leipzig im Umbruch, (with photographs by Ralf Schuhmann and a text by Ingo Andreas Wolf), Verlag der Kunst, Dresden 1999, ISBN 90-5705-142-7
- Milliarden neuer Sterne. Suhrkamp Verlag, Frankfurt am Main 1999
- Formen der inneren und äußeren Welt. Paderborn 2000
- Weggeküßt. Suhrkamp Verlag, Frankfurt am Main 2002, ISBN 3-518-41355-4
- Orte, Leipzig 2003
- Die Gesamtliebe und die Einzelliebe, Poetikvorlesungen. Suhrkamp Verlag, Frankfurt am Main 2004
- Wie weiter. Suhrkamp Verlag, Frankfurt am Main 2006
- Triest. Theater am Meer. Insel Verlag, Frankfurt am Main and Leipzig 2007 (Insel-Bücherei 1290)
- Ich muß mein Herz üben. Gedichte. Insel Verlag, Frankfurt am Main and Leipzig 2009 (Insel-Bücherei 1315)
- Im schönsten Fall. Suhrkamp Verlag, Berlin 2011
- Eine Wiege. Suhrkamp Verlag, Berlin 2015, ISBN 978-3-518-42468-1

=== Audiobooks ===
- in: Poetry of the 20th Century: My 24 Saxon Poets, ed. Gerhard Pötzsch, 2 CD, Militzke Verlag Leipzig, 2009 ISBN 9783861899358
