= Peter Gotthardt =

German composer

Peter Gotthardt (born 22 August 1941) is a German composer, musician and publisher. Film melodies composed by him (more than 500 in total) are known to a wide audience, including major successes such as the pieces Wenn ein Mensch lebt and Geh zu ihr performed by the Puhdys from the 1973 DEFA feature film The Legend of Paul and Paula, directed by Heiner Carow.

== Life ==
Born in Leipzig, from 1961 to 1966, Gotthardt studied piano, correpetition, conducting and composing at the Hochschule für Musik "Hanns Eisler" in Berlin. In 1965, he wrote his first composition for a documentary film by Winfried Junge. A year later, he wrote his first orchestral work. In 1968, he began his first collaboration with Heiner Carow for the DEFA film The Russians Are Coming, which resulted in five joint films in the following years. From 1975 to 1976, he was also head of incidental music at the Rostock Volkstheater.

He has worked as a freelance composer since 1976. In 1991, he founded his own music publishing company and has subsequently also written various compositions for industrial films. In 2018, he received the Honorary Award of the Deutscher Filmmusikpreis.

Gotthardt has lived in Berlin-Mahlsdorf since 1975.

== Awards ==
- 1990: Ernst Reuter Prize für Originalton-Hörspiel Ich schlage vor, den Beifall kurz zu halten
- 2018: Ehrenpreis des Deutscher Filmmusikpreis für sein Lebenswerk

== Recording ==
- Lovedreams. Filmmusiken von Peter Gotthardt. VEB Deutsche Schallplatten Berlin/Amiga 856 270, 1987

== Film scores ==
- 1958: Sandmännchen (TV)
- 1965: Studentinnen – Eindrücke von einer Hochschule
- 1967: Der tapfere Schulschwänzer
- 1968: Mit beiden Beinen im Himmel – Begegnung mit einem Flugkapitän
- 1971: Die Russen kommen
- 1971: Albrecht Dürer 1471 – 1528
- 1971: Karriere
- 1972: Einberufen
- 1973: Der kleine Kommandeur
- 1973: Ich bin ein Junger Pionier
- 1973: Die Legende von Paul und Paula
- 1974: Polizeiruf 110: Per Anhalter (TV series)
- 1974: Polizeiruf 110: Kein Paradies für Elstern (TV series)
- 1974: Liebe mit 16
- 1974: Kriminalfälle ohne Beispiel: Nach Abpfiff Mord (TV series)
- 1974: … verdammt, ich bin erwachsen
- 1974: Polizeiruf 110: Der Tod des Professors (TV series)
- 1975: Blumen für den Mann im Mond
- 1975: Polizeiruf 110: Die Rechnung geht nicht auf (TV series)
- 1976: Auf der Suche nach Gatt (TV)
- 1976: Ohne Märchen wird keiner groß (TV)
- 1976: Polizeiruf 110: Reklamierte Rosen (TV- series)
- 1976: Die Lindstedts (TV series)
- 1977: Berliner in Pankow
- 1977: Gut gemeinter Zuruf oder Das Kleefest
- 1977: Ikarus
- 1977: Heimweh nach Rügen oder Gestern noch war ich Köchin
- 1977: Die Verführbaren (TV)
- 1977: Trampen nach Norden
- 1978: Brandstellen
- 1978: Sieben Sommersprossen
- 1978: Das Tal von Hadramaut
- 1978: Hummelflug
- 1979: Hier wo ich lebe
- 1979: Kennst du das Land… Eine politische Revue (Dok.-film)
- 1979: Bis daß der Tod euch scheidet
- 1979: Schneeweißchen und Rosenrot
- 1979: Der Garten Eden
- 1980: Die Matrosen von Cattaro(Kotorski mornari)
- 1980: Solo für Martina (TV)
- 1981: Adel im Untergang (TV)
- 1981: Liebster Dziodzio (Dokumentarfilm)
- 1981: Trompeten-Anton (TV)
- 1982: Polizeiruf 110: Petra (TV series)
- 1982: Polizeiruf 110: Im Tal (TV series)
- 1982: Das Mädchen und der Junge (TV)
- 1983: Seiten einer Chronik (TV)
- 1983: Angelika aus Mexiko
- 1983: Insel der Schwäne
- 1984: Nachhilfe für Vati (1984) (TV)
- 1984: Flieger (TV)
- 1984: Die Witwe Capet (TV)
- 1984: Rublak – Die Legende vom vermessenen Land
- 1984: Überfahrt (TV)
- 1984: Wo andere schweigen
- 1984: Ich liebe Victor (TV)
- 1984: Polizeiruf 110: Schwere Jahre (1st part) (TV series)
- 1984: Polizeiruf 110: Schwere Jahre (2nd part) (TV series)
- 1985: Das gestohlene Gesicht
- 1985: Polizeiruf 110: Ein Schritt zu weit (TV series)
- 1986: Der Staatsanwalt hat das Wort: Ein todsicherer Tip (TV series)
- 1986: Schauspielereien: Berührungspunkte (TV series)
- 1986: Mönch ärgere dich nicht (TV)
- 1986: Schauspielereien: Zimmer 418 (TV series)
- 1987: Käthe Kollwitz – Bilder eines Lebens
- 1987: Mensch, Hermann! (TV series)
- 1987: Einzug ins Paradies (TV series, 6 episodes)
- 1987: Jan Oppen (TV)
- 1987: Der Staatsanwalt hat das Wort: Ich werde dich nie verraten (TV-Reihe series
- 1988: Gabriel komm zurück (TV)
- 1988: Thomas Müntzer
- 1988: Der Staatsanwalt hat das Wort: Da mach’ ich nicht mit (TV series)
- 1988: Lieb Georg (TV)
- 1988: Der Staatsanwalt hat das Wort: Wo mich keiner kennt (TV series)
- 1989: Polizeiruf 110: Mitternachtsfall (TV series)
- 1989: Schauspielereien: Auf den zweiten Blick (TV series)
- 1989: Der Staatsanwalt hat das Wort: Blaue Taube soll fliegen (TV series)
- 1990: Der Staatsanwalt hat das Wort: Hallo Partner (TV series)
- 1997: Der Hauptmann von Köpenick (TV)
- 2003: Ewige Schönheit
- 2005: Die Hitlerkantate
- 2008: Kategorie C – Der Film

== Radio play music ==
- 1988: Thomas Rosenlöcher: Das Gänseblümchen – direction: Werner Grunow (Children's radio play – Rundfunk der DDR)
- 1992: Clemens Brentano: Die Mährchen vom Rhein und dem Müller Radlauf – direction Peter Groeger (Children's radio play – DS Kultur)
- 1993: Adam Bodor: Die Außenstelle – direction: Peter Groeger (radio play – MDR/ORF)
