= Poetik-Professur an der Universität Bamberg =

German literary award

Poetik-Professur an der Universität Bamberg is a literary prize of Germany. Annually since 1986, authors come to the University of Bamberg, at the invitation of the Chair of Modern German Literature Studies.

== Poetics professor ==
- 1986: Eugen Gomringer
- 1987: Barbara Bronnen
- 1987: not awarded
- 1989: Lutz Rathenow
- 1990: not awarded
- 1991: Tankred Dorst
- 1992: Ingomar von Kieseritzky
- 1993: Gerhard Köpf
- 1994: Giwi Margwelaschwili
- 1995: Hans Joachim Schädlich
- 1996: Zsuzsanna Gahse
- 1997: Gerhard C. Krischker
- 1998: Michael Krüger
- 1999: Doris Runge
- 2000: Marcel Beyer
- 2001: Jan Koneffke
- 2002: Hans Wollschläger
- 2003: Adolf Muschg
- 2004: Bernhard Setzwein
- 2005: Uwe Timm
- 2006: Ulrike Draesner
- 2007: Hanns-Josef Ortheil
- 2008: John von Düffel
- 2009: Wilhelm Genazino
- 2010: Robert Schindel
- 2011: Annette Pehnt
- 2012: Thomas Glavinic
- 2013: Jenny Erpenbeck
- 2014: Peter Stamm
- 2015: Lukas Bärfuss
- 2016: Clemens J. Setz
- 2017: Kathrin Röggla
- 2018: Markus Orths
- 2019: Michael Köhlmeier
- 2020/21: Jan Wagner
- 2021: Silke Scheuermann
