= Édouard Wawrzyniak =

French footballer (1912-1991)

Edouard Wawrzyniak
Personal information
- Full name: Edouard (Edward) Wawrzyniak
- Date of birth: 28 September 1912
- Place of birth: Oberhausen, Germany
- Date of death: 17 April 1991 (aged 78)
- Position: Midfielder

Senior career*
Years	Team	Apps	(Gls)
1933–1936	U.S. Valenciennes		
1936–1937	Olympique de Marseille		
1937–1938	Le Havre AC		
1938–1939	Longwy		
1940–1941	SC Fives		
1941–1945	Lyons OU		
1945–1946	RC Vichy		

International career
1935	France	1	(0)
- * Club domestic league appearances and goals

Edouard Wawrzyniak (28 September 1912 – 17 April 1991), also known as Waggi, was a French professional footballer who played as a midfielder. He played one match for the France national team in 1935.

== Playing career ==
1933–1936: U.S. Valenciennes, France

1936–1937: Olympique de Marseille, France

1937–1938: Le Havre AC, France

1938–1939: Longwy, France

1940–1941: SC Fives, France

1941–1945: Lyons OU, France

1945–1946: RC Vichy, France

== Honours ==
A selection team of France on November 10, 1935 against the Sweden.

Champion of French League in 1937 with the Olympique de Marseille.

Finalist of the Coupe de France in 1941 with the SC Fives.
