= Ernst Reuter Prize =

Former German prize for audio works

The Ernst Reuter Prize (Ernst-Reuter-Preis) is a German national prize for audio plays (Hörspiel) and radio documentation about the divided Germany, named after Ernst Reuter. It was awarded from 1959 to 1991 by the Bundesministerium für innerdeutsche Beziehungen for audio plays and radio documentation, doted 10,000 DM dotiert. It was awarded to productions that dealt with relations of people from the two German nations ("Verhältnis der Menschen in den beiden deutschen Staaten zueinander").

== Selected recipients ==
- Wolfgang Menge (awarded twice, but years unknown)
- 1963 Ingeborg Drewitz
- 1966 Horst Mönnich
- 1971 Erika Runge
- 1978 Thomas Brasch
- 1979 no award
- 1982 Tilo Medek, Dorothea Medek
- 1989 Helga M. Novak
- 1990 Peter Gotthardt
- 1991 Jens Sparschuh (1990 according to some sources)
