= Kerstin Hensel =

German writer

Kerstin Hensel (born 1961) is a German writer.

== Biography ==
Hensel was born in 1961 in Karl-Marx Stadt in the former GDR. A trained nurse, she also studied at the Johannes R. Becher Institute of Literature in Leipzig. She has published numerous books in a variety of genres including novels, short stories, poetry and plays. She has won several literary prizes, among which the most notable are the Anna Seghers Prize in 1987 and the Lessing Prize (Förderpreis) in 1997.

== Awards ==
- 1987 Anna Seghers-Preis
- 1991 Leonce-und-Lena-Preis of the City of Darmstadt
- 1995 Scholarship Villa Massimo, Rome
- 1998 Förderpreis Lessing Prize of the Free State of Saxony
- 2000 Gerrit-Engelke-Preis
- 2004 Ida-Dehmel-Literaturpreis
- 2008 Stahlpreis Eisenhüttenstadt
- 2012 Member of the Academy of Arts, Berlin
- 2014 Walter-Bauer-Preis
