= Achim Hofer =

German musicologist and music educator

Achim Hofer (born in 1955) is a German musicologist, music educator and University professor.

== Life ==
Born in Oberhausen, Hofer studied music, German studies and educational science at the University of Paderborn. After the first and second Staatsexamen, Hofer studied musicology at what is now the Hochschule für Musik Detmold and at the Johannes Gutenberg-Universität Mainz, where he received his doctorate in 1987 with a dissertation entitled Studien zur Geschichte des Militärmarsches.

From 1981 to 1999 he taught music education in the teaching profession, from 1994 also as a lecturer at the University of Dortmund and at the Robert Schumann Hochschule Düsseldorf. In 1999 he was appointed to the chair for musicology and music education on the Landau campus of the University of Koblenz-Landau, where he is head of the Institute for Musicology and Music in the Department of Cultural and Social Sciences. He is a member of the faculty council.

Hofer's research focuses on the early history of harmonie music, wind and brass music and military music in the Nazi period.

== Work ==
- Blasmusikforschung.
- Die "Königlich Preußische Armeemarschsammlung" 1817 - 1839.
