= Lars Dietrich =

Dutch musician and composer

- Born: Lars Dietrich
- Occupations: Saxophonist, composer, electronic musician

Lars Dietrich (born Amsterdam, Netherlands) is a Dutch saxophonist, composer and electronic musician who has been based in New York City and Amsterdam.

== Biography ==
Born in Amsterdam, Netherlands, Dietrich was introduced to the saxophone at the age of 10. After performing a duo TV show with famed Jazz pianist Herbie Hancock, Dietrich decided to pursue a career in music. At the age of fifteen he got accepted to study saxophone at the Conservatory of Amsterdam. In 2005 after completing his Masters in Music degree in Amsterdam he received a full scholarship from Manhattan School of Music, Dietrich moved to New York and studied under Dick Oatts and David Liebman.

As a leader Dietrich released his well reviewed 2009 debut album Breek de Grond and his 2011 solo album Stand Alone. Dietrich also co-leads the band The Story, a collaborative group including Samir Zarif (tenor saxophone), John Escreet (Piano), Zack Lober (bass) and Greg Ritchie (drums).

Venues and festivals Dietrich performed at as a leader and with The Story include North Sea Jazz Festival, Town Hall, Iridium, The Jazz Gallery, Bimhuis, The 55Bar, Smalls, Jazz at Lincoln Center, and Carnegie Hall.

As well as tours throughout Canada, Europe, and the United States and live radio broadcasts for CBC Radio, VPRO With The Story he taught masterclasses at Queens College, University of New Orleans, McGill University, Humber College, York University, Loyola University, and St. Francis Xavier University. He was artist-in-residence for the Guimaraes Jazz Festival.
