= Helga M. Novak =

German-Icelandic writer

Maria Karlsdottir
- Born: 8 September 1935; Berlin
- Died: 24 December 2013 (aged 78); Rüdersdorf
- Writing career
- Pen name: Helga M. Novak

Helga M. Novak (pseudonym for Maria Karlsdottir; 8 September 1935 – 24 December 2013) was a German-Icelandic writer.

Novak was born in Berlin. She grew up in East Germany, studied journalism and philosophy at the University of Leipzig. She resigned from the East German Socialist Unity Party (SED) in 1957 in protest at the Soviet invasion of Hungary the previous year.

She moved to Iceland in 1961, where she married and had two children before her divorce.

She traveled to Spain, France, and the U.S., before returning to East Germany. When her citizenship was revoked for writing and publishing critical texts, she moved between Iceland, Germany, Poland, and Bulgaria. For a short period, she was an informer ("inoffizieller Mitarbeiter") for the East German Stasi. In 2004, German authorities denied her German citizenship. Novak died in 2013 in Berlin.

== Awards ==
- 1968 Literaturpreis der Stadt Bremen
- 1979/1980 Stadtschreiber von Bergen
- 1985 Kranichsteiner Literaturpreis
- 1989 Roswitha Prize
- 1989 Ernst Reuter Prize
- 1990 Marburger Literaturpreis
- 1993 Gerrit-Engelke-Preis
- 1994 Ehrengabe der Deutschen Schillerstiftung
- 1997 Brandenburgischen Literaturpreis
- 1998 Ehrengabe der Bayerischen Akademie der Schönen Künste
- 2001 Ida-Dehmel-Literaturpreis

== Works ==
- Ballade von der reisenden Anna, Neuwied 1965
- Colloquium mit vier Häuten, Neuwied 1967
- Das Gefrierhaus. Die Umgebung, Hamburg 1968 (together with Timm Bartholl)
- Geselliges Beisammensein, Neuwied 1968
- Wohnhaft im Westend, Neuwied 1970 (together with Horst Karasek)
- Aufenthalt in einem irren Haus, Neuwied 1971
- Seltsamer Bericht aus einer alten Stadt, Hannover 1973 (together with Dorothea Nosbisch)
- Die Ballade von der kastrierten Puppe, Leverkusen 1975 (together with Peter Kaczmarek)
- Balladen vom kurzen Prozess, Berlin 1975
- Die Landnahme von Torre Bela, Berlin 1976
- Margarete mit dem Schrank, Berlin 1978
- Die Eisheiligen, Darmstadt 1979
- Palisaden, Darmstadt 1980
- Vogel federlos, Darmstadt 1982
- Grünheide Grünheide, Darmstadt 1983
- Legende Transsib, Darmstadt 1985
- Märkische Feemorgana, Frankfurt am Main 1989
- Aufenthalt in einem irren Haus, Frankfurt am Main 1995
- Silvatica, Frankfurt am Main 1997
- Solange noch Liebesbriefe eintreffen, Frankfurt am Main 1999
