= Ingeborg Drewitz =

German writer and academic (1923–1986)

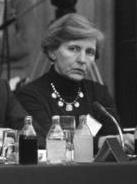
Ingeborg Drewitz in 1981

Ingeborg Drewitz (born Ingeborg Neubert; 10 January 1923 – 26 November 1986) was a German writer and academic.

== Life and career ==
Drewitz was born in Berlin. She graduated in 1941 from the Königin-Luise-Schule in Berlin-Friedenau, and took a doctorate in German literature, history, and philosophy, on 20 April 1945, at the Friedrich-Wilhelm University (today's Humboldt University in Berlin). Her thesis was on German poet Erwin Guido Kolbenheyer.

From 1973 to 1980 she taught at the Institute of Journalism at the Free University of Berlin. A year before her death she was a juror at the Ingeborg Bachmann Competition in Klagenfurt.

She married her childhood sweetheart, Bernhard Drewitz, by whom she had three daughters. She died in Berlin, aged 63, of complications of cancer.

== Writings ==
As a writer, she was interested in the Enlightenment and addressed Germany's post-war history and the past and present social history of women. According to Knaurs Lexikon der Weltliteratur ((in German) "Knaur's Lexicon of World Literature"), third edition of 1995, she "made in her literary work, the abandonment of modern man and his inability to address his neighbour, as well as the problem of the individuality of life. Problems in women and employment are at the heart of her work."

Her drama Alle Tore waren bewacht (All gates were guarded"), which premiered in 1955, was the first German play to address conditions in concentration camps.

Her most successful novel was Gestern war heute: Hundert Jahre Gegenwart (Yesterday was today: A hundred years of presence) (1978), that dealt with three generations of women in the 20th century. The novel is mandatory to read in 12th grade in Baden-Württemberg.

=== Novels ===
- Der Anstoß. Bremen: Schünemann 1958
- Das Karussell. Göttingen: Sachse & Pohl 1969
- Oktoberlicht oder Ein Tag im Herbst. München: Nymphenburger 1969
- Wer verteidigt Katrin Lambert? Stuttgart: Werner Gebühr 1974
- Das Hochhaus. Stuttgart: Werner Gebühr 1975
- Gestern war heute: Hundert Jahre Gegenwart 1978
- Eis auf der Elbe. Tagebuchroman. Düsseldorf: Claassen 1982
- Eingeschlossen. Düsseldorf: Claassen 1986. NA: München: Goldmann TB 1988

=== Non-fiction ===
- Die dichterische Darstellung ethischer Probleme im Werke Erwin Guido Kolbenheyers. Berlin: Univ. Diss. 1945
- Berliner Salons: Gesellschaft und Literatur zwischen Aufklärung und Industriezeitalter. Berlin: Haude & Spener, Schriftenreihe: Berlinische Reminiszenzen Bd. 7, 1965
- Leben und Werk von Adam Kuckhoff. Berlin: Friedenauer Presse, 1968
- Bettine von Arnim. Romantik – Revolution – Utopie. Biographie. Düsseldorf/Köln: Diederichs 1969 – Hildesheim: Claassen, 1992
- Zeitverdichtung: Essays, Kritiken, Portraits; gesammelt aus 2 Jahrzehnten. Wien/München/Zürich: Europaverlag, 1980
- Kurz vor 1984. Stuttgart: Radius-Verlag, 1981
- Schrittweise Erkundung der Welt. Reise-Eindrücke. Wien u.a. : Europaverlag, 1982
- Unter meiner Zeitlupe. Porträts und Panoramen. Wien u.a. : Europaverlag, 1984
- Junge Menschen messen ihre Erwartungen aus, und die Messlatten stimmen nicht mehr – die Herausforderung: Tod. Stuttgart: Radius-Verlag, 1986

== Honours ==
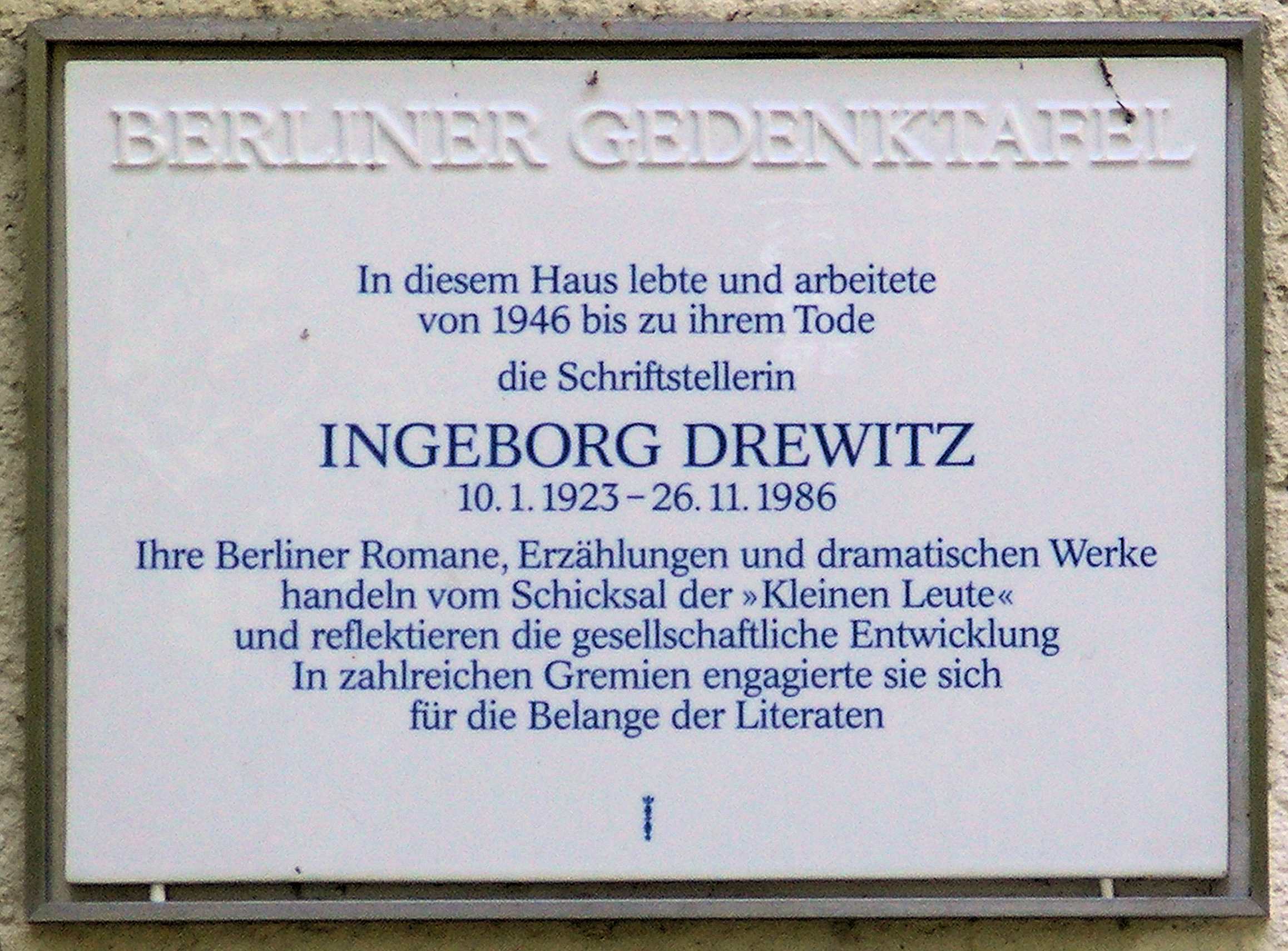
Commemorative plaque in Berlin-Zehlendorf

- 1963 Ernst Reuter Prize
- 1970 Georg Mackensen Literary Prize
- 1973 Federal Cross of Merit
- 1980 Ida-Dehmel-Literature Prize, Carl von Ossietzky Medal
- 1981 Gerrit Engelke Price
- 1983 Evangelischer Book Prize
- 1985 Hermann-Sinsheimer Prize

=== Street names ===
- In the government quarter in Berlin-Mitte: Ingeborg-Drewitz-Allee
- In Berlin-Steglitz: Ingeborg-Drewitz-Library
- In Gladbeck: Ingeborg-Drewitz-Gesamtschule
- In Freiburg: Ingeborg-Drewitz-Allee

=== Prize foundations ===
- Ingeborg-Drewitz Literary Prize for prisoners
- Ingeborg-Drewitz Prize for special commitment to human dignity

== Sources ==
This article was translated from its equivalent in the German Wikipedia on 18 July 2009.

- Bruges Gerhild man Rogers: Das Romanwerk von Ingeborg Drewitz. (Studies in modern German literature, Vol. 26) New York: Lang, 1989, 246 p. ISBN 0-8204-0715-1
- Titus Häussermann, Drewitz Bernhard (ed.): Ingeborg Drewitz: Materialien zu Werk und Wirken. Stuttgart: Radius-Verl., 1983, 160 p. ISBN 3-87173-639-2
- Jutta Rosenkranz: Kurz-Porträt über die Schriftstellerin Ingeborg Drewitz. TV feature, ORB, 1998
