= List of German-language poets =

This list contains the names of individuals (of any ethnicity or nationality) who wrote poetry in the German language. Most are identified as "German poets", but some are not German.

== A ==
- Abraham a Sancta Clara
- Friedrich Achleitner
- Ilse Aichinger
- Renate Aichinger
- Dietmar von Aist
- Heinrich Albert (composer)
- Der wilde Alexander
- Hermann Allmers
- Peter Paul Althaus
- Günther Anders
- Alfred Andersch
- Ernst Moritz Arndt
- Achim von Arnim
- Bettina von Arnim
- Hans Arp
- H. C. Artmann
- Hans Erasmus Aßmann
- Hartmann von Aue
- Count Anton Alexander von Auersperg
- Rose Ausländer

== B ==
- Ingeborg Bachmann
- Hugo Ball
- Wolfgang Bauer
- Kerstin Becker
- Konrad Bayer
- Marcel Beyer
- Johannes Robert Becher
- Jürgen Becker
- Richard Beer-Hofmann
- Gottfried Benn
- Michael Beheim
- Werner Bergengruen
- Thomas Bernhard
- Alexandra Bernhardt
- Jörg Bernig
- F. W. Bernstein
- Marcel Beyer
- Horst Bienek
- Otto Julius Bierbaum
- Wolf Biermann
- Johannes Bobrowski
- Paul Boldt
- Wolfgang Borchert
- Nicolas Born
- Thomas Brasch
- Volker Braun
- Bertolt Brecht
- Helene Brehm
- Clemens von Brentano
- Theo Breuer
- Rolf Dieter Brinkmann
- Georg Britting
- Hermann Broch
- Barthold Heinrich Brockes
- August Buchner
- Georg Büchner
- Gottfried August Bürger
- Hermann Burger
- Erika Burkart
- Wilhelm Busch

== C ==
- Paul-Henri Campbell
- Hans Carossa
- Daniel Casper von Lohenstein
- Paul Celan
- Conrad Celtes
- Adelbert von Chamisso
- Hanns Cibulka
- Matthias Claudius
- Mara-Daria Cojocaru
- Ann Cotten
- Heinz Czechowski
- Daniel Czepko von Reigersfeld
- Elfriede Czurda

== D ==
- Simon Dach
- Theodor Däubler
- Georg Friedrich Daumer
- Max Dauthendey
- Franz Josef Degenhardt
- Richard Dehmel
- Friedrich Christian Delius
- Franz von Dingelstedt
- Hugo Dittberner
- Reinhard Döhl
- Tankred Dorst
- Lebrecht Blücher Dreves
- Annette von Droste-Hülshoff
- Özlem Özgül Dündar

== E ==
- Albert Ehrenstein
- Günter Eich
- Joseph von Eichendorff
- Adolf Endler
- Hans Magnus Enzensberger
- Heinz Erhardt
- Wolfram von Eschenbach

== F ==
- Gustav Falke
- August Heinrich Hoffmann von Fallersleben
- Fereydoun Farrokhzad
- Jörg Fauser
- Ernst, Baron von Feuchtersleben
- Frank Findeiß
- Johann Fischart
- Cäsar Flaischlen
- Paul Fleming
- Walter Flex
- Hans Folz
- Theodor Fontane
- Friedrich de la Motte Fouqué
- Franzobel
- Heinrich Frauenlob
- Ferdinand Freiligrath
- Erich Fried
- Max Frisch
- Gerhard Fritsch
- Franz Fühmann
- Louis Fürnberg

== G ==
- Emanuel Geibel
- Christian Fürchtegott Gellert
- Stefan George
- Paul Gerhardt
- Robert Gernhardt
- Heinrich Wilhelm von Gerstenberg
- Elfriede Gerstl
- Adolf Glassbrenner
- Johann Wilhelm Ludwig Gleim
- Leopold Friedrich Günther von Goeckingk
- Albrecht Goes
- Johann Wolfgang von Goethe
- Johann Nikolaus Götz
- Yvan Goll
- Eugen Gomringer
- Nora-Eugenie Gomringer
- Peter Gosse
- Friedrich Wilhelm Gotter
- Günter Grass
- Fritz Grasshoff
- Martin Greif
- Franz Grillparzer
- Hans Jakob Christoffel von Grimmelshausen
- Klaus Groth
- Durs Grünbein
- Andreas Gryphius
- Johann Christian Günther

== H ==
- Peter Hacks
- Maja Haderlap
- Johannes Hadlaub
- Friedrich von Hagedorn
- Reinmar von Hagenau
- Peter Handke
- Georg Philipp Harsdörffer
- Otto Erich Hartleben
- Peter Härtling
- Walter Hasenclever
- Wilhelm Hauff
- Gerhart Hauptmann
- Friedrich von Hausen
- Albrecht Haushofer
- Christian Friedrich Hebbel
- Johann Peter Hebel
- Johann Heermann
- Martina Hefter
- Heinrich Heine
- Guy Helminger
- Hans-Jürgen Heise
- Helmut Heißenbüttel
- Guy Helminger
- Karl Friedrich Henckell
- Johann Gottfried Herder
- Nikolaus Herman
- Stephan Hermlin
- Georg Herwegh
- Hermann Hesse
- Andrea Heuser
- Georg Heym
- Paul Heyse
- Wolfgang Hilbig
- Jakob van Hoddis
- Sophie Hoechstetter
- Christian Hoffmann von Hoffmannswaldau
- Michael Hofmann
- Hugo von Hofmannsthal
- Friedrich Hölderlin
- Walter Höllerer
- Ludwig Christoph Heinrich Hölty
- Arno Holz
- Peter Huchel
- Richard Huelsenbeck
- Norbert Hummelt
- Christian Friedrich Hunold
- Ulrich von Hutten

== I ==
- Karl Leberecht Immermann
- Hans Irrigmann

== J ==
- Johann Georg Jacobi
- Ernst Jandl
- Elfriede Jelinek
- Albrecht von Johansdorf
- Ernst Jünger
- Friedrich Georg Jünger

== K ==
- Georg Kaiser
- Anja Kampmann
- Franz Xaver Kappus
- Anna Louisa Karsch
- Yaak Karsunke
- Hermann Kasack
- Abraham Gotthelf Kästner
- Erich Kästner
- Marie Luise Kaschnitz
- Gottfried Keller
- Hans Peter Keller
- Odile Kennel
- Justinus Kerner
- Marie-Thérèse Kerschbaumer
- Hermann Kesten
- Gottfried Kinkel
- Sarah Kirsch
- Wulf Kirsten
- Karin Kiwus
- Klabund
- Johann Klaj
- Paul Klee
- Paul Alfred Kleinert
- Ewald Christian von Kleist
- Heinrich von Kleist
- Thomas Kling
- Friedrich Gottlieb Klopstock
- Christian Knorr von Rosenroth
- Gertrud Kolmar
- Michael Kongehl
- August Kopisch
- Theodor Körner
- Theodor Kramer
- Dagmara Kraus
- Karl Kraus
- Helmut Krausser
- Ursula Krechel
- Karl Krolow
- Michael Krüger
- James Krüss
- Nadja Küchenmeister
- Quirinus Kuhlmann
- Günter Kunert
- Reiner Kunze
- Der von Kürenberg

== L ==
- Else Lasker-Schüler
- Christine Lavant
- Hans Leip
- Anton G. Leitner
- Nikolaus Lenau
- Michael Lentz
- Hermann Lenz
- Jakob Michael Reinhold Lenz
- Rudolf Leonhard
- Gotthold Ephraim Lessing
- Heinrich Leuthold
- Thorsten Libotte
- Alfred Lichtenstein
- Magnus Gottfried Lichtwer
- Ulrich von Liechtenstein
- Detlev von Liliencron
- Till Lindemann
- Hermann Lingg
- Cvetka Lipuš
- Angela Litschev
- Otto Heinrich von Loeben
- Friedrich von Logau
- Hermann Löns
- Iwar von Lücken
- Martin Luther

== M ==
- Andreas Mand
- Itzik Manger
- Thomas Mann
- Heinrich Mann
- Uwe Martens
- Kurt Marti
- Friedrich von Matthisson
- Georg Maurer
- Karl May
- Karl Mayer
- Friederike Mayröcker
- Christoph Meckel
- Walter Mehring
- Ernst Meister
- Conrad Ferdinand Meyer
- Johann Martin Miller
- Alfred Mombert
- Christian Morgenstern
- Eduard Mörike
- Heinrich von Morungen
- Johann Michael Moscherosch
- Erich Mühsam
- Heiner Müller
- Inge Müller
- Wilhelm Müller
- Börries Freiherr von Münchhausen

== N ==
- Joachim Neander
- Johann Nestroy
- Georg Neumark
- Friedrich Nietzsche
- Philipp Nicolai
- Helga M. Novak
- Novalis (Friedrich von Hardenberg)

== O ==
- Andreas Okopenko
- Martin Opitz
- Ernst Ortlepp

== P ==
- Bert Papenfuß
- Oskar Pastior
- Ludwig Pfau
- Gottlieb Konrad Pfeffel
- Heinz Piontek
- August von Platen-Hallermünde
- Johannes Plavius
- Steffen Popp
- Kerstin Preiwuß
- Robert Prutz

== R ==
- Wilhelm Raabe
- Ferdinand Raimund
- Karl Wilhelm Ramler
- Irene Ransburg
- Lutz Rathenow
- Jacob Regnart
- Robert Reinick
- Sophie Reyer
- Neidhart von Reuental
- Fritz Reuter
- Johann Rietsch
- Karl Riha
- Rainer Maria Rilke
- Monika Rinck
- Joachim Ringelnatz
- Johann Rist
- Slata Roschal
- Eugen Roth
- Ralf Rothmann
- Friedrich Rückert
- Gerhard Rühm
- Peter Rühmkorf

== S ==
- Hans Sachs
- Nelly Sachs
- Ulrike Almut Sandig
- Alexios Schandermani (born 1953)
- Johannes Scheffler, named Angelus Silesius
- Silke Scheuermann
- Friedrich Schiller
- Robert Schindel
- Kathrin Schmidt
- Sibylla Schwarz
- Kurt Schwitters
- Daniela Seel
- Moriz Seeler
- Lutz Seiler
- Clemens J. Setz
- Tamara Štajner
- Armin Steigenberger
- Friedrich Leopold zu Stolberg-Stolberg
- Ulf Stolterfoht
- Moritz von Strachwitz
- Gottfried von Strassburg
- Botho Strauss
- Der Stricker

== T ==
- Jürgen Theobaldy
- Georg Thurmair
- Maria Luise Thurmair
- Ludwig Tieck
- Ilse Tielsch
- Georg Trakl
- Hugo von Trimberg
- Süßkind von Trimberg
- Kurt Tucholsky
- Ulrich von Türheim
- Heinrich von dem Türlin

== U ==
- Ludwig Uhland
- Anthony Ulrich, Duke of Brunswick-Wolfenbüttel
- Anja Utler

== V ==
- Hendrik van Veldeke
- Walther von der Vogelweide
- Johann Heinrich Voß

== W ==
- Jan Wagner
- Richard Wagner
- Robert Walser
- Peter Waterhouse
- Erich Weinert
- Josef Weinheber
- Christa Wolf
- Uljana Wolf
- Iris Wolff
- Oswald von Wolkenstein
- Konrad von Würzburg

== Z ==
- Judith Zander
- Ulrich von Zatzikhoven
- Unica Zürn

== See also ==
- List of German-language philosophers
- List of German-language authors
- Poetry
- German literature
- List of German-language playwrights
- List of German journalists
- Liste deutschsprachiger Dichter (in German)
