= Lessing Prize of the Free State of Saxony =

German literary award

The Lessing Prize of the Free State of Saxony is a German literary award. It was founded in 1993 by the Government of the Free State of Saxony and is awarded every two years. It consists of a main prize, which honours outstanding achievements in the spirit of Gotthold Ephraim Lessing, especially in the field of literature, literary criticism and the theater. This prize is worth 20,000 euros. In addition, two further "promotional prizes" are awarded, which seek to publicly recognize and promote promising beginnings in these fields. These prizes are each worth 5,500 euros.

The award ceremony usually takes place on 21 January, the eve of Lessing's birthday (22 January 1729), as part of the celebrations organized by the Lessing Museum in his native town of Kamenz. The award builds on the tradition of the Lessing Prize of the GDR, which was awarded from 1955 to 1989 by the Ministry of Culture of the GDR.

== Winners ==
- 1993: Hans Sahl; Förderpreise: Lutz Graf
- 1995: Rolf Hoppe; Förderpreise: Angela Krauss
- 1997: Wolfgang Hilbig; Förderpreise: Kerstin Hensel and Ulrich Zieger
- 1999: Eduard Goldstücker; Förderpreise: Marion Titze and Marcel Beyer
- 2001: Adolf Dresen; Förderpreise: Barbara Köhler and Oliver Bukowski
- 2003: Hans Joachim Schädlich; Förderpreise: Anke Stelling together with Robby Dannenberg and Christian Lehnert
- 2005: Armin Petras; Förderpreise: Martina Hefter and Jörg Bernig
- 2007: Ruth Klüger; Förderpreise: Volker Sielaff and Clemens Meyer
- 2009: Kito Lorenc; Förderpreise: Ulrike Almut Sandig and Dirk Laucke
- 2011: Monika Maron; Förderpreise: Renatus Deckert and Andreas Heidtmann
- 2013: Volker Lösch; Förderpreise: Franziska Gerstenberg and Judith Schalansky
- 2015: Carolin Emcke; Förderpreise: Julius Fischer and Wolfram Höll
- 2017: Kurt Drawert; Förderpreise: Thomas Freyer and Anna Kaleri
- 2019: Marcel Beyer; Förderpreise: Anja Kampmann and Bettina Wilpert
- 2021: Wilfried Schulz; Förderpreise: Jackie Thomae, Anna Mateur and Jasna Zajček
- 2023: Andreas Reimann; Förderpreise: Sarah Lesch and Heike Geißler
- 2025: Clemens Meyer; Förderpreise: Georg Genoux and Tina Pruschmann

== Related awards ==
- Lessing Prize of the Free and Hanseatic City of Hamburg
- Lessing Prize of the GDR
- Lessing Prize for Criticism
- Lessing Ring for the Cultural Award of the German Freemasons
