= Kaleri =

Kaleri is a surname. Notable people with the surname include:

- Aleksandr Kaleri (born 1956), Russian cosmonaut
- Anna Kaleri (born 1974), German writer and screenwriter
