= Matthias Bernegger =

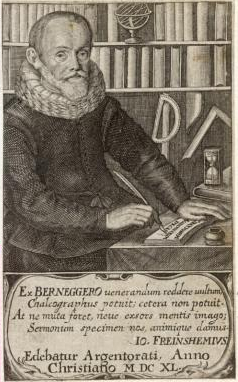
Matthias Bernegger by Peter Aubry.

Matthias Bernegger (Latin: Bernegerus, also Matthew; born 8 February 1582 in Hallstatt, Salzkammergut, died 5 February 1640 in Strasbourg) was a German philologist, astronomer, university professor and writer of Latin works.

== Life ==
Bernegger's Protestant family was, like other so called exulanten, expelled from Habsburg monarchy during the Counter-Reformation. They settled in Regensburg, where Bernegger attended the Gymnasium. In 1599, the 17-year-old began studies in Strasbourg, mainly in the fields of philology and natural sciences. He was fascinated by astronomy and was in contact with Johannes Kepler and Wilhelm Schickard.

Already in 1612, Bernegger had translated a 1606 Italian-language work of Galileo Galilei's into Latin, as Tractatus de proportionum instrumento.

In 1632, via their mutual friend Élie Diodati, Galilei asked Bernegger to translate his Italian-language Dialogo (Dialogue Concerning the Two Chief World Systems) into Latin. In order to protect Galilei's involvement, it was stated in the preface that one of Peter Crüger's pupils, Benjamin Engelcke, had traveled in 1632 to Italy, had met Galilei, and had brought Galilei's book to Bernegger to persuade him to translate, without Galilei's permission.

Bernegger was known for his editions of classic writers like Tacitus and for his correspondence with scholars. Among his students were the Silesian Daniel Czepko von Reigersfeld (1605–1660), Johannes Freinsheim, Johann Michael Moscherosch, Martin Opitz and the Prussian Robert Roberthin (1600–1648).

Since 1607, Bernegger taught, like his colleague Caspar Brülow (1585–1627), at the Protestant Gymnasium, before he was called in 1616 to the Straßburg Academy which was raised in 1621 to a university.

Bernegger was also interested in politics, and during the Thirty Years' War tried to negotiate with the French. As a pacifist, he opposed Caspar Schoppe who called for a holy war against Protestants.

== Works (selection) ==
see list

- Manuale Mathematicum … Allen Bau- vnd Kriegsverständigen … vnd andern Kunstliebenden in Teutscher Sprach. Straßburg 1612
- Tuba Pacis, occenta Scioppiano Belli Sacri Classico. Straßburg 1621 (against Caspar Schoppe)
- Systema cosmicum, Authore Galilaeo Galilei. Straßburg 1635 (Latin translation of Galilei's Italian language Dialogo (Dialogue Concerning the Two Chief World Systems))

== Correspondence ==
- Hugonis Grotii & Matthiae Berneggeri Epistolae. Straßburg 1667
- Epistolae J. Keppleri & M. Berneggeri. Straßburg 1672
- Epistolae W. Schickarti & M. Berneggeri. Straßburg 1673
