= Özlem Özgül Dündar =

- Born: 1983 (age 42–43); Solingen, Germany
- Occupation: novelist
- Writing career
- Language: German
- Genre: screenplays
- Notable works: Turks, Fire

Özlem Özgül Dündar (born 1983 in Solingen, Germany) is a German poet, essayist, translator, and novelist.

== Personal life ==
Dündar was born in Solingen, Germany. She attended the University of Wuppertal and studied philosophy and literature there. After traveling to Ireland, where she completed a semester abroad, Turkey, and Paris, she worked with several artists collectives, among other Kanack Attak Leipzig, Kaltsignal, GID, and the Ministry for Compassion.

She moved to Leipzig in 2015 to attend the German Institute for Literature, where she experienced a lot of racially motivated attacks on refugee homes, which ultimately inspired her to write her debut screenplay.

== Career ==
Dündar writes poetry, prose, essays, and translates from Turkish.

Her screenplay and audio drama Turks, Fire, tells the story of the 1993 Solingen arson attack on a Turkish home in which five people were killed. She originally wrote it as a project for her third year in university. Dündar was ten when the attack took place and originally set out to write a screenplay because she wanted the characters to be physically present.

The screenplay was adapted into a novel published in 2021.

Her poetry collection gedanken, zerren was published by ELIF Verlag in 2018 and she co-published the anthology Flexen – Flâneusen * schreiben Städte, published by Verbrecher Verlag in 2019.

== Stipends, awards, and prizes ==
- 2010: Düsseldorf Förderpreis
- 2011: Merck Stipend in Darmstadt
- 2014: Goethe Institute Turkish German translation project stipend in Istanbul
- 2015: Wolfgang Weyrauch Prize
- 2015: Retzhof Drama Prize
- 2017: Work stipend of North Rhine-Westphalia
- 2018: Kelag-Preis Award at the Ingeborg-Bachmann contest in Klagenfurt for an excerpt of Turks, Fire
- 2018: Rolf Dieter Brinkmann stipend from the city of Cologne
- 2019: Alfred-Müller-Felsenburg Prize
- 2020: Audio drama of the year honor for the audia drama adaptation of Turks, Fire
- 2021: Casa Baldi stipend
