= Alexandra Bernhardt =

German poet, translator and publisher

Alexandra Bernhardt (born 1974 in Bavaria, Germany) is a German philosopher, poet, writer, translator, editor and publisher with Slovenian and Austrian roots living in Austria.

== Life and work ==
Alexandra Bernhardt read philosophy, comparative literature studies, classical philology (ancient Greek) and oriental studies at LMU Munich and the University of Vienna. In 2007, she graduated from the class of Peter Kampits with the University of Vienna. Her master thesis dealt with the teleological concept of the philosophical term "person".

Bernhardt writes mainly poetry but has also published a collection of short stories. Under the pseudonym Oskar Seltsam, she also writes children's poetry. Besides, she translates poetry from Catalan, Danish, English, Icelandic and Polish, amongst others, into German. Her own poems have been translated into American English, Danish, Dutch, French and Slovene and set to music

Since 2019, Bernhardt is the editor of the Jahrbuch österreichischer Lyrik (Yearbook of Austrian Poetry), a biennial anthology of contemporary Austrian poetry.

In the spring of 2020, Bernhardt founded the Vienna based independent publishing house Edition Melos the focus of which lies on contemporary German-language poetry. The Edition Melos is known for encouraging debuts as well as publishing works of notable authors and artists like Petrus Akkordeon, Franzobel, Petra Ganglbauer, Andzrej Krauze, Sophie Reyer, Gerhard Rühm and Boško Tomašević. The publishing programme has been called to be "high-class (hochkarätiges literarisches Programm)" (Marcus Neuert, Signaturen-Magazin) and "sophisticated (feingeistig)" (Grazer Autorenversammlung).

Bernhardt has received numerous awards for her work, including the Vienna Literature Grant in 2021 and the Media Prize of the RAI South Tyrol at the Merano Poetry Prize in 2022.

Since 2002, she lives in Vienna.

== Critical reception ==
"Alexandra Bernhardt masters the craft of poetry so well that she can elevate above the classical forms by using them. Alongside the elaborated old school sonnets, there are fragile free forms of poetry, full of gentle formal irony that makes everything that is said sparkle and glint. (Alexandra Bernhardt beherrscht das Handwerk des Gedichtemachens so sicher, dass sie sich über die klassischen Formen erheben kann, indem sie sie benützt. Neben den geschliffenen Sonetten alter Schule stehen hier fragile freie Lyrikformen, voll leiser formaler Ironie, die das Gesagte funkeln und blitzen lässt.)" – Edith-Ulla Gasser in an ORF broadcast about "Alexandra Bernhardts lyrisches Handwerk (Alexandra Bernhardt's poetic craftsmanship)"

"These small, compacted forms do not (...) restrict, but rather provide space to follow the network of references. The typography (...) may remind of a ship's bow or a sail; nautical vocabulary gives the poems a strong motivic compactness. (Diese kleinen, komprimierten Formen (...) engen nicht ein, sondern sie gewähren Raum, dem Verweisnetz zu folgen. Die Typographie (...) mag an einen Schiffbug gemahnen oder an ein Segel; nautisches Vokabular verleiht den Gedichten eine starke motivische Dichte.)" – The jury of the Merano Poetry Prize about the awarded poetry cycle trutzlichtigall

"In (...) Europaia (2021), or European-ish, Alexandra Bernhardt establishes what it means to be European through found, fractured, and experimental poems, reflecting Europe's long and shifting cultural identities. (...) At the center of Bernhardt's work is a focus on encountering the other, which is perhaps Europe's greatest historical inheritance – border-creation, border-destruction, and all that lies between. / Bernhardt's restructuring and deconstruction of language include Middle High German dialect and unestablished compound words, creating a rich and complicated narrative for twenty-first-century readers. (...) (T)here is not one historical or present-day Europe, Bernhardt argues, but instead multiple Europes frankensteined together into something more reflective of human movement and resistance on the continent." – Hannah V Warren about translating the poetry collection Europaia, for which Warren was awarded the PEN/Heim Translation Fund Grant in 2025

== Awards (selection) ==
- 2015 Scholarship of the mentoring programme of the Bavarian Film Center Munich
- 2017 Nominated for the Spiegelungen Poetry Prize (audience award)
- 2020 Scholarship by the Cultural Department of the City of Vienna
- 2021 Vienna Literature Grant
- 2022 Media Prize of the Rai South Tyrol at the Merano Poetry Prize
- 2023 Project scholarship for literature by the Cultural Department of the City of Vienna
- 2024 Scholarship for literature by the Ministry of the Arts, Culture, the Civil Service and Sport (Austria)

== Publications ==
=== Independent publications ===
- Et in Arcadia ego. Gedichte (Even in Arcadia, there am I. Poems). Sisyphus, Klagenfurt 2017, ISBN 978-3-903125-09-4.
- Hinterwelt oder Aus einem Spiegelkabinett. Erzählungen (World behind the World. Stories). Sisyphus, Klagenfurt 2018, ISBN 978-3-903125-31-5 .
- Weiße Salamander. Gedichte (White Salamanders. Poems). edition offenes feld, Dortmund 2020, ISBN 978-3-7504-9335-3.
- Europaia. Gedichte (European-ish. Poems). Sisyphus, Klagenfurt 2021, ISBN 978-3-903125-57-5.
- Under the pseudonym Oskar Seltsam: Mit 20 Tieren um die Welt. Gedichte (With 20 Animals around the World. Poems). Illustrated by Andrzej Krauze. Edition Melos, Wien 2022, ISBN 978-3-9505056-2-7.
- Schwellenzeit. Von Honig und Mohn. Gedichte (Threshold Time. Of Honey and Poppy. Poems). Edition Melos, Wien 2022, ISBN 978-3-9505384-3-4.
- Zoon poietikon. Gedichte (Inventive Beast. Poems). Sisyphus, Klagenfurt 2024, ISBN 978-3-903125-86-5.
- capvt mvndi. Gedichte. Edition Melos, Wien 2025, ISBN 978-3-9505758-4-2.

=== Editorial work ===
- Jahrbuch österreichischer Lyrik 2019 (Inventive Beast. Poems). Sisyphus, Klagenfurt 2019, ISBN 978-3-903125-39-1.
- Jahrbuch österreichischer Lyrik 2020/21 (Inventive Beast. Poems). Edition Melos, Wien 2021, ISBN 978-3-9519842-6-1.
- Drei. Hasenbichler, Alfred, Hintermayer. Junge Lyrik aus Österreich (Inventive Beast. Poems). With an introduction by Sophie Reyer. Edition Melos, Wien 2022, ISBN 978-3-9505056-6-5.
- Jahrbuch österreichischer Lyrik 2022/23 (Inventive Beast. Poems). Edition Melos, Wien 2023, ISBN 978-3-9505384-4-1.
