= Moriz Seeler =

German writer (1896-1942)

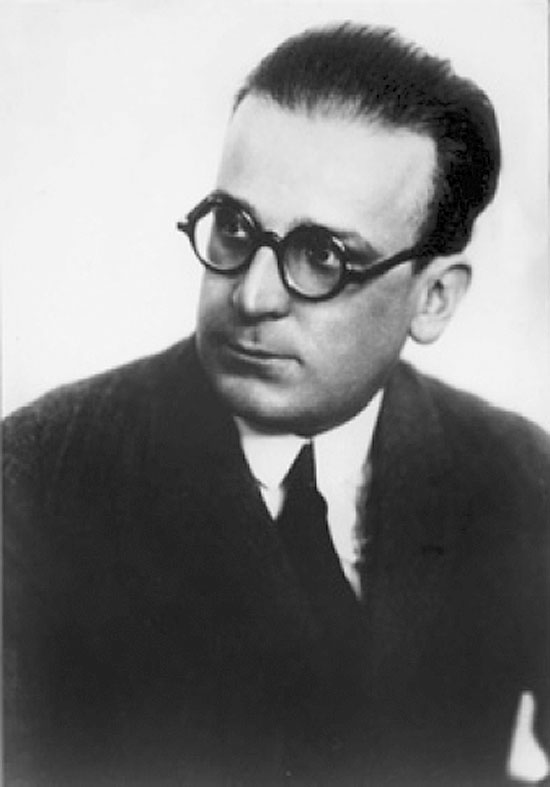
- Born: 1 March 1896; Greifenberg, Pomerania, Germany
- Died: 18 August 1942 (aged 46); Rumbula or Bikernieki Forest, near Riga, Latvia
- Occupation(s): poet, writer, film producer, man of the theatre

Moriz Seeler (1 March 1896 – 18 August 1942) was a German poet, writer, film producer, and man of the theatre.

== Early life ==
Moritz Seeler was born in the small, provincial town of Greifenberg in Pomerania, Germany (now Gryfice in northwestern Poland), to a Jewish family. He moved to Berlin at the age of 15. His first verses are said to have been published as early as 1917–1918; the first collection of poems, Dem Hirtenknaben, was issued in Berlin in 1919; another one, entitled Die Flut, was published in Vienna in 1937. At some point, Seeler began using "Moriz," rather than his birth name of Moritz.

== Biography ==
He is perhaps best known as the founding father of the Junge Bühne (‘Young Stage’), an avant‑garde matinee-theatre which came into being in Berlin in the spring of 1922. In 1927 he co‑authored the libretto to Friedrich Hollaender’s cabaret Bei uns um die Gedächtniskirche rum. In June 1929 he co‑founded (together with Robert Siodmak and Edgar G. Ulmer) Filmstudio 1929, a Berlin production house. In 1929–1930 he co‑produced, together with Heinrich Nebenzahl, the silent quasi-documentary film Menschen am Sonntag, directed by Robert Siodmak (1900–1973) and starring Brigitte Borchert and Erwin Splettstößer, which shows a candid picture of life in Weimar-era Germany.

In 1998 a small book written about him by Günther Elbin, Am Sonntag in die Matinee, appeared in Germany. Following this development, in November 2000, a memorial plaque was erected on the façade of the tenement at the Brandenburgische Straße 36 in what is now the Berlin borough of Charlottenburg-Wilmersdorf, identifying the house as the locale where Moriz Seeler lived from 1916 to the mid‑1920s. In September 2002 a street, previously known as Franz‑Ehrlich-Straße, in another of the Berlin boroughs (that of Treptow-Köpenick), was renamed Moriz‑Seeler‑Straße in his honour. The capital of Austria has had a street named Moritz‑Seeler‑Gasse since 1969.

== Deportation and death ==
Seeler was deported from Berlin to Riga, Latvia on 15 August 1942. Seeler arrived in Riga on 18 August 1942, along with the other 1,003 men, women, and children who were deported along with him from Berlin.

Shortly after arrival, all passengers, including Seeler, were executed in the Rumbula and Bikernieki forests.

== See also ==
- Cinema of Germany
- Erich Heller (s.v. Life in letters)
- Marieluise Fleißer
- List of German language poets
