= Anja Kampmann =

German writer (born 1983)

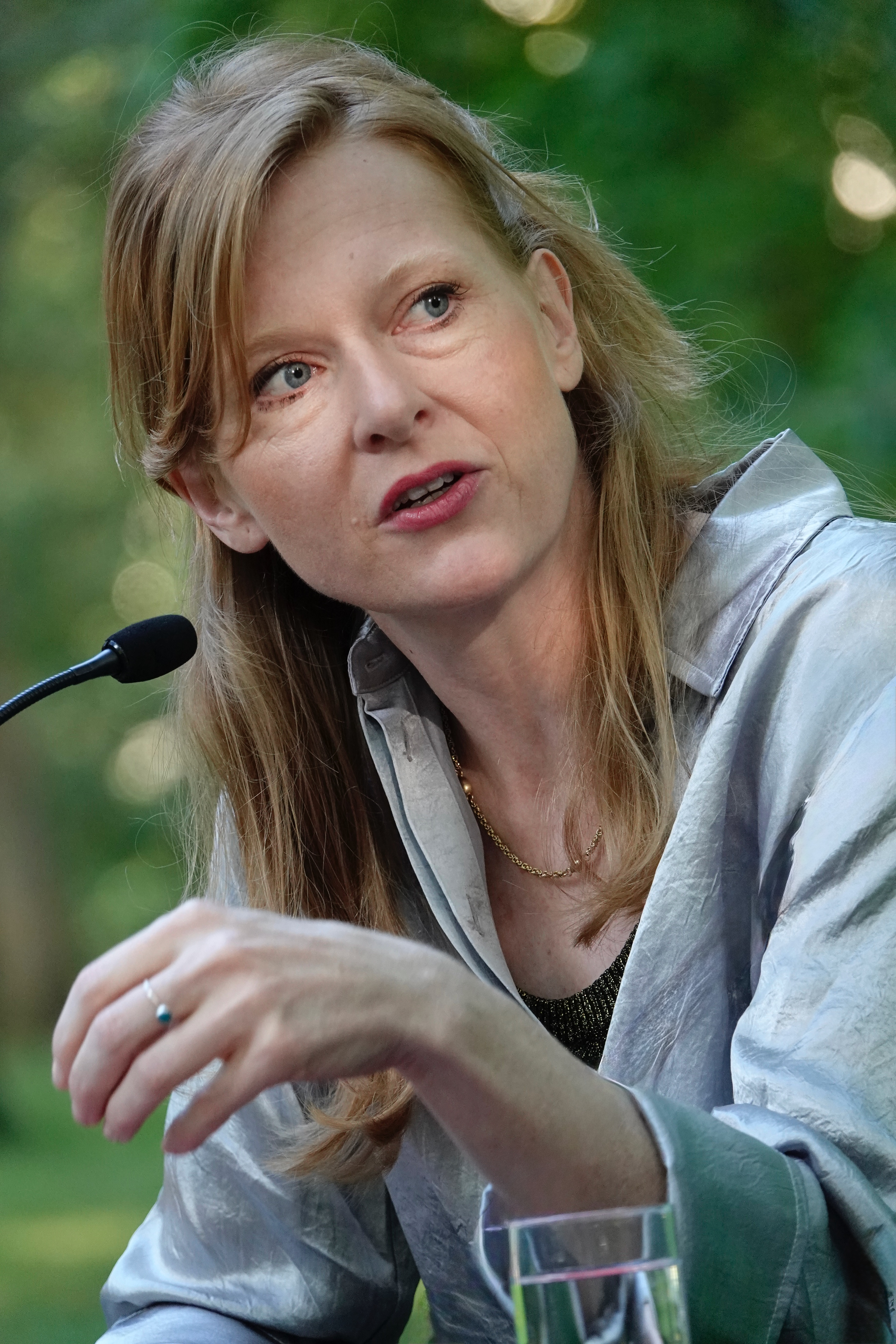
Kampmann in 2025

Anja Kampmann (born 30 October 1983) is a German poet and author.

== Biography ==
Kampmann was born in 1983 in Hamburg. She studied at the University of Hamburg and at the German Institute for Literature (Deutsches Literaturinstitut) in Leipzig. She also attended the renowned International Writing Program at the University of Iowa with a scholarship, then start of a dissertation on Samuel Beckett's later prose (musicality & silence) as well as work for the radio. Since 2011, she has been working for Deutschlandfunk and NZZ, among others.

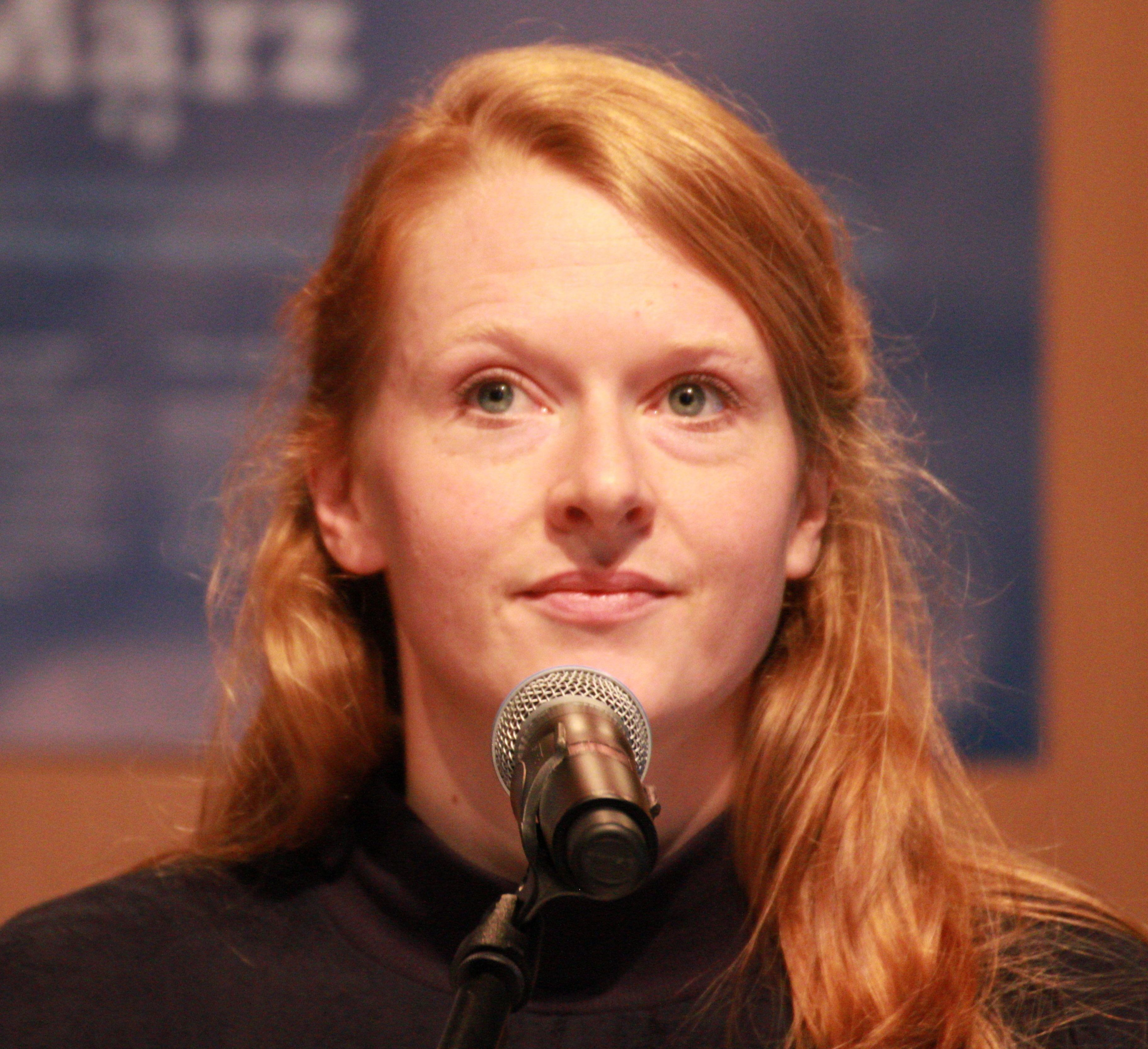
Kampmann in 2015

Her poetry has been published in numerous German publications. Her debut collection Proben von Stein und Licht appeared in 2016 in Edition Lyrik. Her first novel Wie hoch die Wasser steigen (High As The Waters Rise, translated by Anne Posten) has received widespread acclaim, and has won many prizes among them the Mara Cassens Prize and the Lessing Prize (Förderpreis). It was shortlisted for the National Book Award for Translated Literature in 2020. In 2021 she published her second collection of poetry Der Hund ist immer hungrig (the dog is always hungry) which was widely acclaimed.

She lives in Leipzig.

== Works ==
- 2016: Kampmann, Anja (2016). Proben von Stein und Licht Gedichte (in German). München: Carl Hanser Verlag. ISBN 978-3-446-25053-6. OCLC 932024014.
- 2018: Kampmann, Anja (2018). Wie hoch die Wasser steigen Roman (in German). München: Carl Hanser Verlag. ISBN 978-3-446-25815-0. OCLC 1008600336.
  - 2019: Kampmann, Anja (2019). High as the waters rise : a novel. New York: Catapult. ISBN 978-1-948226-52-3. OCLC 1139202885. English translation by Anne Posten.
- 2021: Kampmann, Anja (2021). Der Hund ist immer hungrig. Gedichte (in German). München: Hanser, Carl. ISBN 978-3-446-26753-4. OCLC 1200204887.
- 2025: Kampmann, Anja (2025). Die Wut ist ein heller Stern (in German). München: Hanser. ISBN 978-3-446-28120-2. OCLC 1526300885.

== Awards ==
- 2010: Scholarship “International Writing Program” University of Iowa
- 2013: 1st Prize MDR Literature Prize
- 2014: Feldkircher Poetry Prize (2nd prize)
- 2015: Wolfgang Weyrauch Prize
- 2017: Artist in Residence at Villa Sträuli in Winterthur
- 2017: Finalist Alfred Döblin Prize
- 2018: Nomination for the Leipzig Book Fair Prize ( Fiction ) with High as the waters rise
- 2018: Nomination for the German Book Prize (longlist) with High as the waters rise
- 2018: Finalist in the Aspekte-Literaturpreis with High As The Waters Rise
- 2018: Literature Prize of the Lüneburg District for High As The Waters Rise
- 2018: Mara Cassens Prize for High as the waters rise
- 2019: Lessing Prize of the Free State of Saxony (sponsorship prize)
- 2019/2020: Stadtschreiber von Bergen
- 2020: High as the Waters Rise. Translation of Anne Posten. Shortlisted for the National Book Award.
- 2020: Rainer Malkowski Prize of the Bavarian Academy of Fine Arts (together with Norbert Hummelt)
- 2023: Ten-week London scholarship from the German Literature Fund, as Writer-in-Residence at Queen Mary University of London (spring 2024)
- 2025: Scholarship of the Lessing Prize of the Free and Hanseatic City of Hamburg
- 2026: Hans Fallada Prize for Die Wut ist ein heller Stern
