= Rainer Kirsch =

German writer and poet (1934–2015)

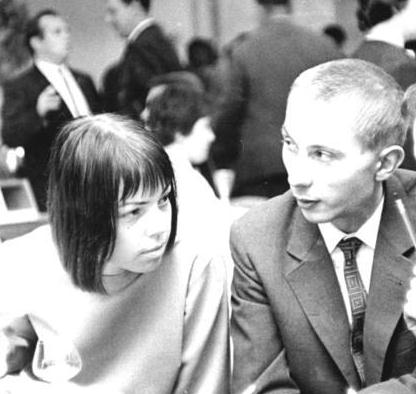
Sarah and Rainer Kirsch in 1964.

Rainer Kirsch (17 July 1934 – 4 September 2015) was a German writer and poet.

== Life and career ==
Kirsch was born in Döbeln in 1934. After graduating from high school, he studied history at the Klosterschule Roßleben and philosophy at the Martin Luther University of Halle-Wittenberg and the University of Jena in 1953. In 1957 he was relegated, and in 1958 he was expelled from the Socialist Unity Party of Germany (SED). After that, he worked as a laborer in a print shop, as a chemical worker, and in agriculture.

From 1960 until his death in 2015, he was a freelance writer and published his first poems. From 1963 to 1965, he studied at the German Institute for Literature in Leipzig. He was considered a representative of the Saxon School of Poetry.

From 1960 to 1968, he was married to the writer Sarah Kirsch. In 1973, he was excluded from the SED for the second time due to disputes over his comedy Heinrich Schlaghands Höllenfahrt. After the peaceful revolution in East Germany in 1990, he was president of the East German Writers' Association, in the same year a member of the Academy of Arts in Berlin. Kirsch was also a member of the Saxon Academy of Arts.

Kirsch emerged as a writer of poetry, plays, short stories and essays, radio plays and children's books. He also produced numerous translations and adaptations from Russian (Osip Mandelstam, Anna Akhmatova, Sergei Yesenin, Vladimir Mayakovsky, Daniil Kharms, Yevgeny Yevtushenko, Vladimir Vysotsky, and Maxim Gorky), Georgian (Vazha-Pshavela), English (John Keats, Percy Bysshe Shelley) and French (Molière, Edmond Rostand) languages.

Kirsch died in Berlin on 4 September 2015 at the age of 81.

== Works ==
- Berlin-Sonnenseite, Reportage (with Sarah Kirsch) (1964)
- Gespräch mit dem Saurier, Gedichte (with Sarah Kirsch) (1965)
- Heinrich Schlaghands Höllenfahrt (1973)
- Wenn ich mein rotes Mützchen hab, Kinderbuch, Kinderbuchverlag, (Ost-)Berlin (1974)
- Kopien nach Originalen, Porträts 1974, mit einem Report über seine Schulzeit in Roßleben
- Das Wort und seine Strahlung, Essays zur Dichtungstheorie (1976)
- Vom Räuberchen, dem Rock und dem Ziegenbock, Erzählung (with Hans Ticha) (1978)
- Auszog das Fürchten zu lernen, Gedichte (1978)
- Das Land Bum-Bum, Oper (Music by Georg Katzer)
- Ausflug machen, Gedichte (1980)
- Die Perlen der grünen Nixe, ein mathematisches Märchen (1983)
- Der kleine lila Nebel, Kinderbuch (with Johannes K. G. Niedlich) (1985)
- Ordnung im Spiegel, Essays, Notizen, Gespräche, Reclam, Leipzig, 1985; 2. Auflage, Reclam, Leipzig (1991)
- Sauna oder die fernherwirkende Trübung, Erzählungen (1985)
- Kunst in Mark Brandenburg, Gedichte, Hinsdorff, Rostock 1988, 3-356-00151-5; Hanser, München (1989)
- Anna Katarina oder Die Nacht am Moorbusch, eine sächsische Schauerballade nebst dreizehn sanften Liedern und einem tiefgründigen Gespräch. Illustriert von Renate Totzke-Israel, Hinstorff, Rostock (1991)
- Die Talare der Gottesgelehrten, Kleine Schriften. Mitteldeutscher Verlag, Halle (1999):
- Werke (4 Bände), Eulenspiegel, Berlin (2004)
- Band 1: Gedichte & Lieder.
- Band 2: Erzählungen & Porträts.
- Band 3: Stücke & Libretti.
- Band 4: Essays & Gespräche.
- Der Menschenfeind. Komodie von Molière, nachgedichtet von Rainer Kirsch, Eulenspiegel, Berlin (2009)

=== Audiobooks ===
- In: Dichtung des 20. Jahrhunderts: Meine 24 sächsischen Dichter (collaborated with Gerhard Pötzsch), 2 CDs, Militzke, Leipzig (2009)
