= Erich Heller =

British essayist (1911–1990)

Erich Heller (27 March 1911 – 5 November 1990) was a British essayist, known particularly for his critical studies in German-language philosophy and literature of the nineteenth and twentieth centuries.

== Biography ==
Heller was born at Chomutov in Bohemia (then within Austria-Hungary, now the Czech Republic), to the family of a Jewish physician. He graduated a doctor of law from the German University in Prague (Deutsche Universität in Prag, Juridische Fakultät) on 11 February 1935, at the age of 23. In 1939 he emigrated to the United Kingdom, where he began his professional career as a Germanist, being active at Cambridge and London (England) and at Swansea (Wales). Heller became a British subject in 1947. From 1960 onwards he was based in the United States, primarily at Northwestern University in Evanston, Illinois, where he was initially Professor of German, and subsequently Avalon Professor of the Humanities until his retirement in 1979.

For Heller, German letters as an academic discipline was something of an avocation. He kept a certain distance from the scholarly community around him, believing (with Jacob Burckhardt) this community's pedantry and unremitting quest for precision to be 'one of the most cunning enemies of truth', their cumulative effect being 'the absence of true comprehension'.

== Main currents of his thought: anima naturaliter religiosa ==
Not a religious philosopher (and an agnostic by personal persuasion), he could show religious sensibility, as when he wrote, in an essay on Heinrich von Kleist that bridges Heideggerian and Biblical idioms, that:

according to Plato the human mind has been in the dark ever since it lost its place in the community of Truth, in the realm, that is, of the Ideas, the eternal and eternally perfect forms, those now unattainable models which man in his exile is able to see and recognize only as shadows or imperfect copies. And this Platonic parable of the damage suffered by man's soul and consciousness is not unlike the Fall as it is narrated in Genesis. The Fall was the consequence and punishment of man's free will that for the first time had asserted itself against the universal God and rejoiced in a consciousness and pleasure entirely its own –– tragically its own; for man had to forsake the indwelling in the supreme Intelligence and thus the harmony between himself and Being as such...

Heller accepted the Fall, or rather its philosophical consequences. Writing elsewhere about Friedrich von Schiller Heller states that Schiller presented

'a striking instance of a European catastrophe of the spirit: the invasion and partial disruption of the aesthetic faculty by unemployed religious impulses. He [Schiller] is one of the most conspicuous and most impressive figures among the host of theologically displaced persons who found a precarious refuge in the emergency camp of Art.'

== Disinherited Mind; or the Creed of Ontological Invalidity ==
Heller's The Disinherited Mind, a seminal work published in 1952 (US ed., expanded, 1957), earned him a following among intellectuals. The project of The Disinherited Mind was to analyse the disappearance of Truth from the immediate environment of man, and the ensuing compulsions of Art to fill the void. Such an intervention on the part of Art, in the circumstances, results in the impoverishment of the world, not in its enrichment. It entails the loss of 'significant external reality'.

The Disinherited Mind was first published in Britain; two years later it was issued under the title Enterbter Geist by Suhrkamp in Frankfurt. An Italian translation followed in 1965, and a Japanese rendering in 1969.

=== Formulating the 'Creed' ===
For Heller, Truth could be defined in the terms proposed by Paul Roubiczek in Thinking in Opposites, a book that appeared in the same year as did The Disinherited Mind: Truth must be embodied in external reality. (Heller says the same in The Disinherited Mind when he points out that the question, What is Truth? becomes irrelevant 'in the face of its embodiment'.) Roubiczek's grasp of the meaning of Truth is more philosophical than Goethe's, according to whom Truth is 'a revelation emerging at the point where the inner world of man meets external reality...'

Heller saw Truth as the first casualty of the mechanistic theory of nature, set on its course by Darwin and others, which in alliance with applied sciences roots out the intrinsic meaning of things in favour of the 'how?' of their causal interrelatedness. The thing in itself is forgotten, and with it the meaning of Reality as such. Such theories succeed merely in feeding 'the body of superstitious beliefs that had grown rampant ever since medieval scholasticism suffered its final defeat at the hands of Francis Bacon'.

This process, of Reality's being eviscerated of deeper meaning in the course of being 'explained' by modern science, constitutes the main charge that Heller laid against supporters of what he called the Creed of Ontological Invalidity. The practical result of its implementation is that nothing can exist in and of itself: things' scientific explanation deprives them of their individual being as entities and reduces them to the position of mere links in a much more broadly conceived chain. Here there are echoes — and indeed a defence — of Martin Heidegger's das Sein des Seinden, although Heller would probably have rejected these. This state of affairs leads to spiritual perdition, he felt, whereby man's own true significance as a higher being (his 'ontological mystery') is obscured, and whereby any attempt at a meaningful response to the world is stymied. For such a response can only take place vis-à-vis the question of what the world fundamentally is, not simply how it works.

The meaningful response that the fully realised human being makes to the world differs from the attitude of the frog-in-the-well scientist in the most fundamental of ways: the former — through his theorising, which is the 'highest intellectual achievement' — actually shapes the Reality, rather than passively 'recording' it in the manner of the latter whose mere 'looking at a thing is of no use whatsoever'. Heller's best-known quotation is: "Be careful how you interpret the world; it is like that." The admonition is not addressed to those who 'find and accept' (as he put it), but to those who through the 'intuitive, visionary faculty of... [their] genius' essentially create the world we know.

=== Objections ===
An objection levelled against The Disinherited Mind (and registered in the Postscript, Part 4 of the essay entitled "The Hazard of Modern Poetry," which Heller appended to the US edition of 1957) was that the Weltanschauung at the heart of its critique was in some aspects excessively Holocaust-centric. (Heller took exception to this term, preferring the English word 'genocide', or the Semitic words sho'ah and hurban (Hebrew, 'annihilation'), to 'Holocaust'.)

Heller chose not to contest this charge. However, the book itself throws some light on this question. In the chapter 'Goethe and the Avoidance of Tragedy', a non-Jewish philosopher of stature, Karl Jaspers, is quoted on Goethe's having become – in an important sense – obsolete after 1945. This is on account of his inadequate grasp of the problems of theodicy, that is, chiefly, of the problem of the existence of Evil. The question posed is not whether the Holocaust was central to Erich Heller (as it was to all the Jews who survived), but whether any human being can avoid being conscious of its centrality.

For Heller, the Body was central to human identity. The Body was the principium individuationis (in the sense that Nietzsche understood or misunderstood that expression, which was good enough for Heller). He once confessed privately that it is precisely because religions like Christianity offered a redemption that, for him, entailed the greatest sacrilege – a divestiture of the Body in Paradise in favour of some 'transfigured' entity that seemed to merge the individual personhood, eschatologically speaking, into a single collective state of all the blessed – it is for this reason that he was not interested in those religions. The Holocaust had a theological dimension for him, also. With its mass destruction of bodies it violated the principle of the sacred, of the spiritual, as manifested in the world. For Heller, the spiritual was never a tissue of 'vague abstractions': it was always incarnate. The spiritual needed the Body in exactly the same measure in which it needed transcendence: the spiritual had to be 'known and felt to be real'. 'Genius' alone, he once wrote, 'is never the whole man'.

=== On Nietzsche ===
Heller points out that Nietzsche's and Rilke's opposition to valid distinctions — in particular Nietzsche's relativisation of Good and Evil — was an over-reaction. It took against what both writers diagnosed as the 'barbarism of concepts' of a 'crudely interpreted world' (the expression is Nietzsche's), whereby the dual aspects of immanence and transcendence — closer to each other than human thought has been prepared to allow over the centuries — open the floodgates to a series of specious distinctions. Pre-eminent among the latter is the false distinction between thought and feeling. But, in their zeal to uncover the fraud of such bifurcations, the two thinkers carry their denunciation too far: Nietzsche, in particular, overstates his case when he links Good with Evil.

=== Borrowing ===
In a critique of T. S. Eliot's views on Shakespeare – who supposedly modelled himself on Montaigne in formulating the character of Hamlet – Heller took a commonsensical approach to literary borrowing. His position has broader applications. Eliot – Heller writes —

suggests that Shakespeare, in making Hamlet think in the manner of Montaigne, did not think himself, but merely 'used' thought for dramatic ends. This sounds true enough, and would be even truer if it were possible to 'use' thought without thinking in the process of using it. For thought is not an object, but an activity, and it is impossible to 'use' an activity without becoming active. One can use a table without contributing to its manufacture; but one cannot use thinking or feeling without thinking or feeling. Of course, one can use the results of thought in a thoughtless fashion. In this case, however, one does not use thought, but merely words that will, more likely than not, fail to make sense.

Heller adduces another case in point: 'If Dante's thought is Thomas Aquinas's, it is yet Dante's: not only by virtue of imaginative sympathy and assimilation, and certainly not as a reward for the supply of an "emotional equivalent" [sc. in its unique capacity as poetry]. It is Dante's property by birthright. He has reborn it within himself –– poetically.'

The argument preempts criticism of Heller's philosophy, based on its roots in Nietzsche and Rilke, and (mutatis mutandis) of Kafka. The title of The Disinherited Mind itself might have been suggested by Rilke's Seventh Elegy.

== Other works; or the Last Days of Mankind ==
Bibliographies are a dull business (as Erich Heller remarks in his 'The Last Days of Mankind'). The Disinherited Mind was followed by another collection of essays, The Artist's Journey into the Interior (1965; German ed., Die Reise der Kunst ins Innere und andere Essays, 1966; Japanese translation, 1972); then by The Poet's Self and the Poem: Essays on Goethe, Nietzsche, Rilke and Thomas Mann (1976); and finally by Im Zeitalter der Prosa: literarische und philosophische Essays, published simultaneously in German and in English editions (the latter under the title In the Age of Prose: Literary and Philosophical Essays) in 1984.

Heller's early article on Karl Kraus, 'The Last Days of Mankind', was originally published in the Cambridge Journal in 1948, its title taken from one of Kraus's plays, Die letzten Tage der Menschheit (1919).

=== Writings on Nietzsche ===
Heller's German-language Nietzsche: 3 Essays appeared in 1964, establishing him as an authority on Friedrich Nietzsche. An English-language collection of –– chiefly cross-cultural –– essays on the subject was brought out by the University of Chicago Press as The Importance of Nietzsche in 1988 to wide acclaim on both sides of the Atlantic. The collection was posthumously published in Germany four years later. His essay on 'Wittgenstein and Nietzsche' appears in Portraits of Wittgenstein (1999).

Heller also contributed an introduction to R. J. Hollingdale's (1930–2001) translation of Nietzsche's Menschliches, Allzumenschliches ("Human, All Too Human"), published by Cambridge University Press in 1986.

=== Writings on Thomas Mann ===
Already in 1940, soon after his arrival at Cambridge, the 29-year-old Heller annotated a collection of Thomas Mann's short stories for a British publisher. Thomas Mann's writings were collectively the subject of Heller's doctoral dissertation, written under the supervision of Edwin Keppel Bennett (1887–1958), which was presented to the University of Cambridge (where, it may be noted, he was a member of Peterhouse and the Faculty of Modern and Medieval Languages) in February 1949: in this work he considered Mann's corpus in relation to the main currents of thought in nineteenth-century Germany.

Heller's well-known study of Thomas Mann (The Ironic German, 1958; German ed., Thomas Mann, der ironische Deutsche, 1959; Jap. transl. (from the revised German), Tômasu Man: hangoteki doitsu-jin, 1975) is based on information derived from his personal acquaintance of the subject. Gabriel Josipovici (b. 1940) called it in March 2006 one 'of the most important books in my intellectual formation'.

Later, Heller would also write an introduction to the 1972 reissue of Kenneth Burke's translation of Thomas Mann's Der Tod in Venedig (originally published in 1925), and to the American translation of Mann's Wagner und unsere Zeit (ed. Erika Mann).

=== Writings on Kafka; and the Question of Negative Transcendence ===
Heller shared Franz Kafka's background. He also studied at the same university, in the same department, and took the same degree as did Kafka, 29 years before him. The essay on Kafka (Kafka, London: Fontana Modern Masters, 1974; US ed., Franz Kafka, New York, 1975) is still valuable for its author's synthesis of his subject's multifaceted, cross-pollinated mindset and cultural heritage. Decades before this essay was published Heller had used the expression negative transcendence, for which he is still remembered, to describe the particular quality of the visible reality adumbrated in Kafka's compositions, and particularly discernible in The Castle.

In Kafka's world, contingent reality has been completely unhitched from the realm of the intelligible, from Truth that is—a positivistically ruled domain where the mutual causal relations between things preclude any reference to the transcendent in the elucidation of their meaning. Yet, it is the transcendent that constitutes a major part of that meaning (if indeed it does not exhaust it completely). In this situation, the meaning of reality methodically purged of what are taken to be illegitimate, because scientifically 'unprovable', elements becomes truncated, grossly incomplete, thereby producing a spiritual vacuum that, sealed off (as it were) 'from above', has no choice but to resolve the tension between the void and the plenum by sucking up 'from below' the stuff from Hell to replenish itself with. This is negative transcendence. For where the positive values are suppressed, Evil will take over with the force and inevitability of a physical necessity. One might call it Heller's law.

Erich Heller had earlier been, famously, the co-editor of Kafka's love-letters addressed to Felice Bauer (1887–1960), the revealing 782-page Briefe an Felice..., published in 1967, to which he wrote an introduction that became something of a classic in itself, being retained for the French translation of the correspondence in question. Subsequently, Heller also contributed an introduction to an English translation of Der Prozess, and edited Kafka's Der Dichter über sein Werk, and his Über das Schreiben.

=== German writings ===
A selection of his essays on Nietzsche, Thomas Mann, T. S. Eliot, and Karl Kraus appeared in Germany in 1977 under the title Die Wiederkehr der Unschuld: this collection includes the beautiful essay 'Vom Menschen, der sich schämt' in which Erich Heller surveys the human attitude the Greeks called aidos, as manifested in later history. Die Wiederkehr der Unschuld followed upon essays on Rilke, Nirgends wird Welt sein als innen (1975), and Essays über Goethe, which saw the light of day in 1970. These in turn were preceded by his Studien zur modernen Literatur of 1963. His article 'Karl Kraus und die schwarze Magie der Sprache' appeared in Der Monat (VI/64) in 1954; while his paper on Rilke, 'Improvisationen zur ersten der Duineser Elegien', presented at a congress in Italy in 1982, is published in a collective volume.

=== Book series ===
Heller was the general editor of Studies In Modern European Literature and Thought, a book series published from 1952 by Bowes & Bowes, Cambridge.

== Life in letters ==
Heller corresponded with a number of thinkers of his day, whose names include (in the chronological order of the date of birth, not necessarily in the order of the respective correspondents' importance) the following.

- Thomas Mann
- E. M. Forster
- T. S. Eliot –– who is repeatedly taken to task in The Disinherited Mind for what Heller considers to be egregious lapses of literary judgement
- Conrad Aiken
- Moriz Seeler –– whose letters to Heller include some of Moriz Seeler's rare poetic compositions
- Carl Zuckmayer, the German playwright
- C. M. Bowra
- Werner Heisenberg of uncertainty principle fame –– who is quoted approvingly in The Disinherited Mind on the wrongheadedness of modern science
- Rudolf Arnheim
- Lionel Trilling
- Dolf Sternberger, the German political scientist and moral philosopher (1907–1989) –– who had one of his books introduced by Heller
- Victor Lange, the American-based German literary scholar (1908–1996)
- Friedrich Torberg, the Austrian writer –– with whom Heller shared a Bohemian-Jewish background
- Stephen Spender –– whom at one time he persuaded to deliver lectures at Northwestern
- Oskar Seidlin, the Silesian-born Jewish literary scholar
- Hans Egon Holthusen, the German poet and littérateur –– who stands accused in the pages of The Disinherited Mind of that 'spiritual timidity' whose 'coarser symbols are the fig-leaves of the Vatican Museum'
- Heinz Kohut, psychoanalyst
- Noel Annan
- Marcel Reich-Ranicki, the celebrated Polish-born German literary critic

Perhaps his most notable correspondent had been Hannah Arendt; perhaps, indeed.

Many important biographical details shared with him by other writers could only with the greatest difficulty, if at all, find their way into conventional studies and biographies, and remain hidden from public view (such as, for example, Thomas Mann's verbal confession, made to Heller, concerning the circumstances attending upon the destruction, by his own hand, of his early diaries [their homosexual content was the immediate cause], or another concerning his reading and re-reading of Xenophon's Symposium 'nine times' before writing his own narrative on love's vicissitudes, Der Tod in Venedig).

Erich Heller's vivid intellect made him on occasion a principled controversialist, as evidenced by his long-running –– and sometimes acrimonious –– public exchanges with another prominent British Germanist, T. J. Reed, in the weekly pages of the Times Literary Supplement in the 1970s.

== Private life ==
Heller was a lifelong bachelor who cultivated several meaningful intellectual friendships, including with the Chicago writer Joseph Epstein. W. H. Auden is also known to have been an early friend.

=== Views on America ===
Although he apparently never sought to become a citizen of the United States, a country where he spent upwards of a third of his life, Heller nevertheless had a deep respect for American democracy, which he felt embodied values directly opposed to those that informed the political realities of the Central Europe he fled in 1939. This pietistic stance however never prevented him from espousing views considered by the mainstream opinion in America to be outdated or otherwise 'politically incorrect' whenever he thought them valid on objective grounds; nor did he shrink from considering America an intellectual desert.

=== The Heidegger Question ===
Much interested in the thought of Nietzsche and Wittgenstein (he contributed a 'Vorwort zum Tractatus logico-philosophicus'), Heller had also a natural attraction for the basic issues raised by Martin Heidegger in his works on Being, which were directly relevant to his own reflections on the nature of Reality. An obstacle to a deeper analysis of Heidegger's œuvre was presented by that writer's questionable but imperfectly explored association with National Socialism. At an early stage in his life Heller, in a bid to 'absolve' Heidegger in his own mind, went so far as to undertake a special trip to post-war Germany to meet the renowned philosopher in person; but his 'Why?' was met by stony silence. The encounter seemed to convince Heller that there was little one could add, by way of moral comment on Heidegger, that has not been expressed in Paul Celan's poem 'Todtnauberg', written later but in similar circumstances, with its well-known topos of suffocation at what Celan calls Krudes (an instance of smuttiness).

This turn of events must needs be adjudged a most unfortunate one, given that much of Heller's best thought can be viewed as a continuation in one sense or another of Heidegger's preoccupation with Being; certainly Heidegger's Sein und Zeit, in its original edition, was a prized possession and remained part of Heller's personal library to his last day (surviving the substantial paring down of his collection upon his moving into a retirement home in the final stages of his life). It is possible, and indeed probable, that if the outcome of his meeting with Heidegger, which might have taken place c.1947, had been more positive in providing answers to some of the burning questions, the final shape of The Disinherited Mind, Heller's first book, would have been substantially different, and that we would have been presented therein with manifold instances of direct engagement with Heidegger's propositions. As things stand, there are just a couple of perfunctory references to Heidegger in this, nolens volens, most 'Heideggerian' of books. (Those references do nevertheless reveal intimate acquaintance with his thought.) Just as Heidegger had not a single word for Heller during their meeting, so also he has barely a word to spare for Heidegger.

=== Festschrift ===
On his 65th birthday in 1976 (the year of Heidegger's death) Erich Heller was presented with a commemorative volume of Goethe studies written in his honour, entitled Versuche zu Goethe (ed. Volker Dürr and Géza von Molnár), which includes an extensive bibliography of his own works.

Another tribute from an unexpected quarter came five years later from the aforementioned Hans Egon Holthusen (see Life in Letters, above), who also taught at Northwestern between 1968 and 1981, and who, despite the criticisms meted out to him in The Disinherited Mind, delivered himself of a 'Geburtstagsgruß an Erich Heller' in Merkur (35, 1981; pp. 340–342) on the occasion of Heller's 70th birthday. From a more critical perspective, a 2021 essay in the Journal of Austrian-American History presents an overview of Heller's career and work based in part on research carried out with the assistance of the Heller papers at Northwestern University.

== Death ==
Erich Heller died on 5 November 1990 in a retirement home in Evanston, Illinois. He was 79. His body was subsequently cremated. His library, including the complete set of the Musarion-Ausgabe of Nietzsche's works with which he never parted during his lifetime, became dispersed among second-hand bookshops.

Heller's personal papers, including private correspondence and manuscripts, are preserved in parts at the Northwestern University Archives in Evanston, and in parts at the Deutsches Literaturarchiv (Schiller-Nationalmuseum) in the southwestern German city of Marbach am Neckar (Baden-Württemberg). The files of the Northwestern University Archives contain some photographs. The Library of Congress in Washington, D.C., for its part, holds facsimiles of some of his letters (in particular those addressed to Hannah Arendt and Robert B. Silvers), in addition to the sound recordings of two of his lectures, the one on 'The Modern German Mind: The Legacy of Nietzsche', which he delivered in the Coolidge Auditorium of the Library of Congress on 8 February 1960, the other on 'The Works of Nietzsche', recorded in 1974.

In 2015, Random House published Reading Claudius: A Memoir in Two Parts by Erich Heller's niece, Caroline, the daughter of his brother Paul. In the book, Caroline Heller writes of her father, mother, and uncle's lives in pre-war Prague, emphasizing the rich mix of the cultural, literary, and political before the Nazi invasion. She writes of her mother and uncle's escape from Prague as Hitler's power grew, as well as Paul Heller's arrest by the Gestapo the night Hitler invaded Poland. Reading Claudius uses excerpts from Paul Heller's writings to chronicle his six years subsequent years in Buchenwald and Auschwitz. Reading Claudius received praise from the Sunday New York Times Book Review and the Boston Globe, among other newspapers and journals.

Erich Heller lacks an entry in the Encyclopædia Britannica, as he does in Bautz' Biographisch-Bibliographisches Kirchenlexikon, although he does command a mention in the Brockhaus Enzyklopädie.

== Supplementary references (not included in Notes, below) ==
The sources listed below provide further information on the man and his thought or document the latter's reception.

- Robert Alter, 'The Jewish Voice', Commentary, vol. 100 (October 1995).
- Aristides, 'Will You still Feed Me?', American Scholar, vol. 66 (Spring 1997).
- Sven Birkerts, An Artificial Wilderness: Essays on 20th-century Literature (New York, Morrow, 1987), pp. 4, 8, 271–274, 410.
- Elizabeth Boa, Kafka: Gender, Class and Race in the Letters and Fictions (Oxford, Clarendon Press, 1996), pp. xi, 28, 48, 244, 287.
- Margaret Church, Time and Reality: Studies in Contemporary Fiction (Chapel Hill, University of North Carolina Press, 1963), pp. 136–137, 142, 149, 158, 178, 184.
- F.W. Dupee, 'The Ironic German, by Erich Heller; Last Essays, by Thomas Mann', Commentary, vol. 28, No. 2 (August 1959).
- Kathleen Powers Erickson, At Eternity's Gate: The Spiritual Vision of Vincent Van Gogh (Grand Rapids, Mich., W.B. Eerdmans, 1998), p. xv.
- Alain Finkielkraut, The Imaginary Jew, transl. Kevin O'Neill & David Suchoff (Lincoln, Nebraska, University of Nebraska Press, 1994), p. 187.
- Joshua Foa Dienstag, 'Wittgenstein among the Savages: Language, Action and Political Theory', Polity, vol. 30 (1998).
- Giles Fraser, Redeeming Nietzsche: On the Piety of Unbelief (London, Routledge, 2002), pp. 1, 103, 119, 167, 175.
- Ronald Douglas Gray, Kafka's Castle (Cambridge, Cambridge University Press, 1956), pp. 6–7, 58, 60, 110–112.
- John Gross, 'Growing up Anglo-Jewish', Commentary, vol. 111 (June 2001).
- Giles Gunn, The Culture of Criticism and the Criticism of Culture (New York, Oxford University Press, 1987), pp. 20, 115, 140, 204–205.
- Thomas Rice Henn, The Harvest of Tragedy (London, Methuen & Co., 1956), pp. ix, 36, 219, 249, 256.
- Alfred Kazin, Contemporaries (Boston, Little, Brown, 1962), pp. 278–279, 282–283, 498.
- Roger Kimball, 'Schiller's "Aesthetic Education"', New Criterion, vol. 19 (March 2001).
- Terrance W. Klein, How Things are in the World: Metaphysics and Theology in Wittgenstein and Rahner (Milwaukee, Marquette University Press, 2003), p. 27.
- Edith Kurzweil and William Phillips, eds., Literature and Psychoanalysis (New York, Columbia University Press, 1983), pp. v, 7, 67, 72, 402.
