= Andrea Heuser =

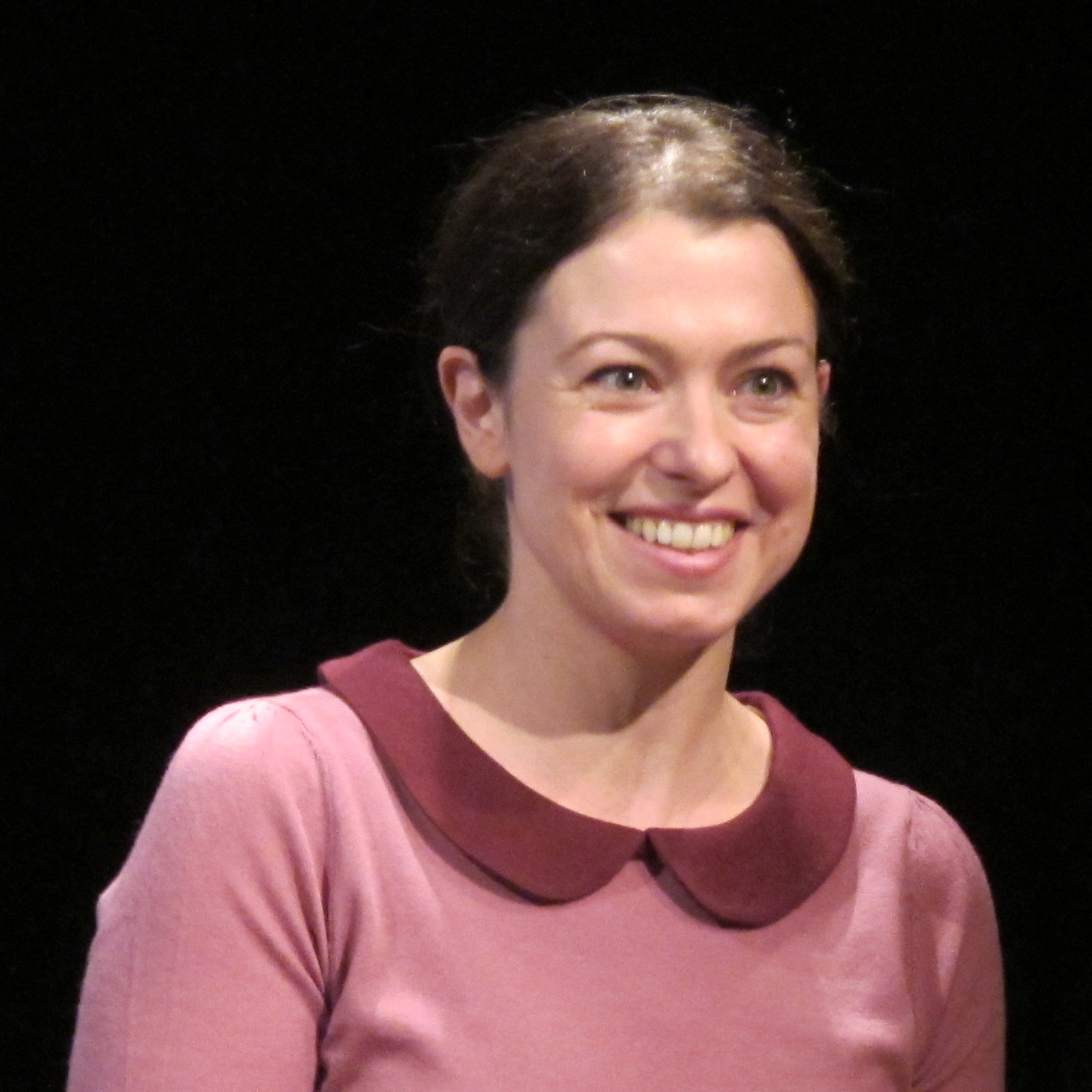
- Born: 5 October 1972 (age 53); Cologne, Germany
- Occupations: Writer, poet, translator and literary scholar
- Years active: 1999–present
- Website: Andrea Heuser in: Reimfrei (in German)

Andrea Heuser (born 5 October 1972 in Cologne) is a German writer, poet, translator and literary scholar.

== Life and work ==
Andrea Heuser has studied German philology, politics and comparative religious studies in Cologne and Bonn. In 2008 she earned a doctorate with a dissertation on German-Jewish-literature. Her study was published in 2011 with the title Vom Anderen zum Gegenüber. „Jüdischkeit“ in der deutschen Gegenwartsliteratur (From the Other to the vis-à-vis. “Jewishness“ in German contemporary literature). Andrea Heuser is herself active in the field of literature, with poetry, prose, libretti and musical theatre. She had teaching assignments at the University of Cologne and the University of Television and Film Munich. In the Munich poetic society, "Lyrik Kabinett", she initiated the Autorenwerkstatt (workshop for authors) and the project Lust auf Lyrik. Gedichte an Schulen. (In the mood for poetry. Poems in schools). In addition to that, she moderated a series of poetry events named Lyrik-Plattform in Munich together with Karin Fellner, Augusta Laar and Gabriele Trinckler. Andrea Heuser is member of the poetry groups Lyrinx and Reimfrei. On the website lyrikline.org of the Haus für Poesie Berlin, Andrea Heuser's poems can be listened to as well as her translations of the works of the Lebanese woman poet Hanane Aad. In 2004, her poems were published by onomato Verlag in Düsseldorf. In 2014, her debut novel was published at DuMont in Cologne.

== Awards ==
- 2006: Award Preis der Bodenseeländer (IBK) für Lyrik
- 2007: Sponsorship grant Wolfgang Weyrauch Prize
- 2007: Grant of the Hermann-Sudermann-Stiftung für Autoren
- 2009: Sponsorship award of the Literaturpreis Wartholz
- 2009: Literary grant Literaturpreis der Landeshauptstadt München
- 2010: Working grant from the Deutschen Literaturfonds for her novel Augustas Garten
- 2012: Finalist at the Merano Poetry Prize
- 2016: Literature Scholarship of Bavaria for the novel project Das Winkelhaus

== Poems set to music ==
- 2000: by edition zeitklang
- 2002: by amphion-records
- 2007: by Eichborn Lido

== Publications (selection) ==
- 2004: vor dem verschwinden (before disappearing) onomato Verlag, Düsseldorf 2008
- 2014: Augustas Garten (Augusta's garden) Dumont, Cologne 2014, ISBN 978-3-8321-9763-6
- 2021: Wenn wir heimkehren. (When we come home) Dumont, Cologne 2021, ISBN 978-3-8321-9811-4

== Performance of works (selection) ==
- 2002: Dr. Popels fiese Falle (Dr. Bogey's nasty trap, Music: Moritz Eggert), Children's opera. Premiere 2002 at Oper Frankfurt, resumption 2007 at Oper Hamburg.
- 2007: Rotkäppchen, lauf! (Run, Little Red Riding Hood!), Musical theatre play. Performances 2007 at theatres in Osnabrück (premiere), Munich and Kassel.
- 2012: All diese Tage (All these days, Music: Moritz Eggert), Opera. Premiere 2012 at Theater Bremen.
