= Wolfgang Weyrauch Prize =

German literary prize

The Wolfgang Weyrauch Advancement Prize is a literary prize in Hesse, Germany named for writer Wolfgang Weyrauch. Established in 1997, the prize is awarded to young writers for their encouragement and includes a stipend in the amount of €8,000.

== Winners ==
- 1979: Anna Jonas
- 1981: Renate Fueß and Tina Stotz-Stroheker
- 1983: Wolf-Dieter Eigner, Klaus Hensel, Barbara Maria Kloos and Rainer René Müller
- 1985: Hansjörg Schertenleib and Sabine Techel
- 1987: William Totok and Michael Wildenhain
- 1989: Lioba Happel, Durs Grünbein and Rainer Schedlinski
- 1991: Dirk von Petersdorff and Barbara Köhler
- 1993: Dieter M. Gräf and Ludwig Steinherr
- 1995: Ulrike Draesner, Thomas Gruber and Christian Lehnert
- 1997: Franzobel and Andreas Altmann (poet)
- 1999: Anja Nioduschewski, Nicolai Kobus, Henning Ahrens
- 2001: Mirko Bonné, Maik Lippert, Hendrik Rost
- 2003: Marion Poschmann and Nico Bleutge
- 2005: Karin Fellner and Hendrik Jackson
- 2007: Nora Bossong and Andrea Heuser
- 2009: Juliane Liebert and Judith Zander
- 2011: Andre Rudolph and Jan Volker Röhnert
- 2013: Uljana Wolf and Tobias Roth
- 2015: Anja Kampmann and Özlem Özgül Dündar
- 2017: Christoph Szalay and Jan Skudlarek
- 2019: Charlotte Warsen and Alexandru Bulucz
- 2021: Anna Hetzer and Lara Rüter
- 2023: Robert Stripling und Sophia Klink
- 2025: Ana Tcheishvili und Ozan Zakariya Keskinkilic
