= Caspar Brülow =

Caspar Brülow (1585-1627) was a Pomeranian scholar and dramatist who wrote in Latin and German. He is remembered for his Latin language dramas on Biblical and Classical subjects which were performed by his students.

Born in Falkenburg, he moved to Strasbourg to study philology in 1607. Like his later colleague Matthias Bernegger, he began his career as a teacher at the Protestant Gymanasium school, starting there in 1612 and spending the rest of his life in Strasbourg. In 1615 he was appointed to the Academy, at which he specialised in Latin rhetoric. In 1616 he was awarded the title of Poet Laureate. In 1622 he was appointed director of the Gymnasiusm.

Brülow is primarily noted for his dramatic poetry in Latin. From 1612, he wrote a play in Latin each year, to be performed at the Strasbourg Academy Theatre. A version in German was always also written. His play Chariclia is known to have been performed in German at the Dresden court.

Brülow was apparently a popular teacher, as evidenced from the notes of his pupil Johann Michael Moscherosch, who provides details of Brülow's annual theatrical productions. The dramas involved a chorus singing at the end of each act, in imitation of the Greek dramatic chorus. However, these were at least as much musical interludes as summations and commentary on the action in the manner of Ancient Greek drama. The music was generally composed by Thomas Walliser. Like the contemporary English Renaissance theatre, the plays did not obey the classical unities and mixed tragedy with comedy.

In addition to his dramas Brülow wrote textbooks and a Latin epic about Martin Luther entitled "De vita rebusque gestis Martini Lutheran".

Brülow died in 1627 at the age of 41 in his adopted home of Strasbourg.

== Works ==
- Andromeda. Tragoedia. Straßburg 1612
- Elias. Drama Tragicum. Straßburg 1613
- Chariclia. Tragico-comoedia. Straßburg 1614
- Nebucadnezar. Comoedia sacra. Straßburg 1615
- Cajus Julius Caesar. Tragoedia. Straßburg 1616
- Moses, sive Exitus Israelitarum ex Aegypto. Tragico-comoedia sacra. Straßburg 1621
