= Hans Sahl =

German author

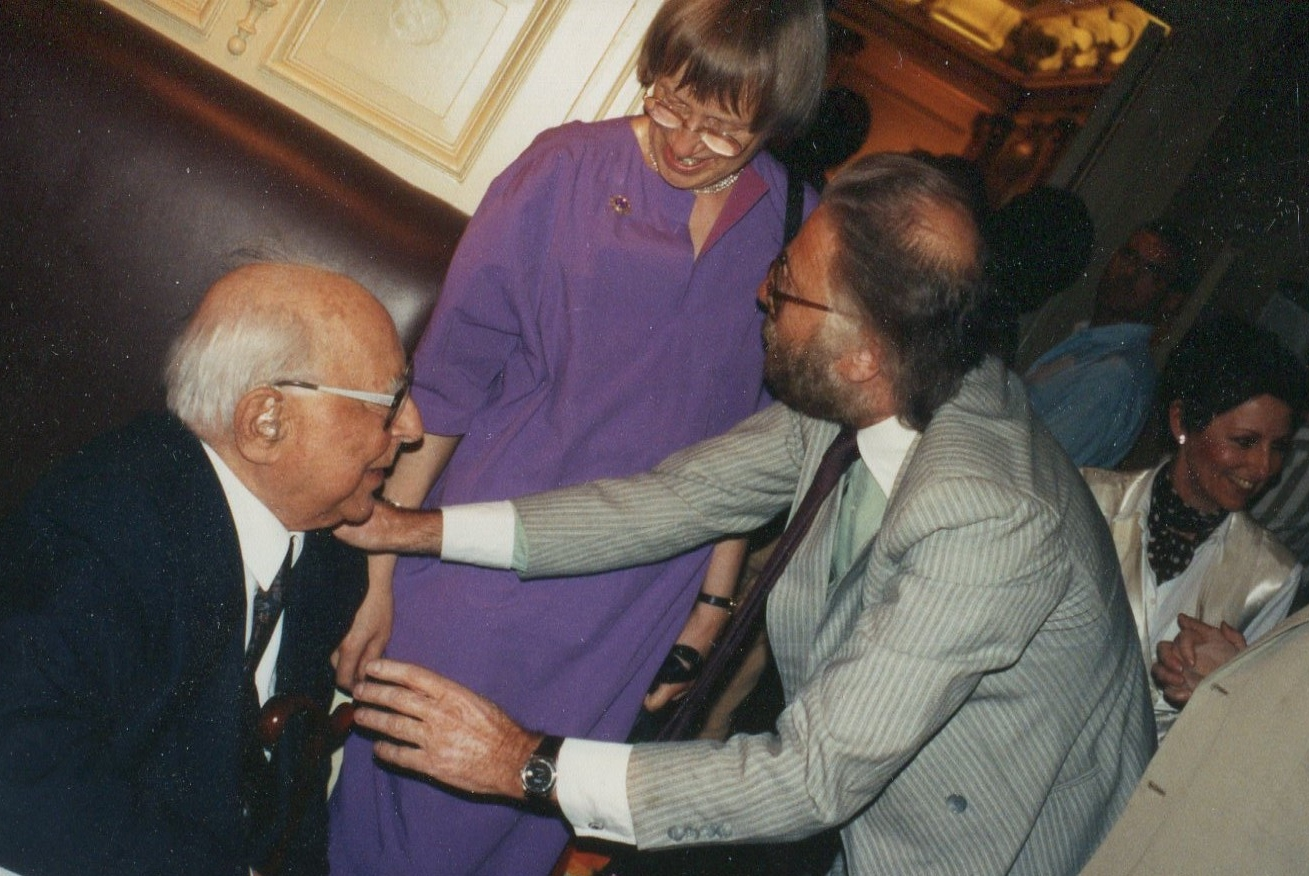
Hans Sahl (l.) with Fritz J. Raddatz in Literaturhaus Hamburg

Hans Sahl (born Hans Salomon, 20 May 1902 in Dresden – 27 April 1993 in Tübingen) was a poet, critic, and novelist who began during the Weimar Republic. He came from an affluent Jewish background, but like many such German Jews he fled Germany due to the Nazis. First to Czechoslovakia in 1933, then to Switzerland, and then France. In France he was interned along with Walter Benjamin. He would later flee Marseille and work with Varian Fry to help other artists or intellectuals fleeing Nazism. From 1941, he lived in New York. In 1952, Sahl became an American citizen. He became known as one of the anti-fascist exiles and in the US translated Arthur Miller, Thornton Wilder, and Tennessee Williams into German. In 1989, he returned to Germany.

== Awards ==
- 1962 Member of the Deutsche Akademie für Sprache und Dichtung
- 1982 Commander's Cross of the Order of Merit of the Federal Republic of Germany
- 1984 Andreas Gryphius Prize
- 1991 Goethe Medal
- 1993 Carl Zuckmayer Medal
- 1993 Lessing Prize of the Free State of Saxony
