= Peter Kampits =

Austrian philosopher (1942–2026)

- Born: 28 June 1942; Vienna, Nazi Germany
- Died: 16 June 2026 (aged 83); Vienna, Austria
- Education: Hernalser Gymnasium Geblergasse; University of Vienna
- Occupation: Philosopher

Peter Kampits (28 June 1942 – 16 June 2026) was an Austrian philosopher.

== Life and career ==
Kampits was born in Vienna on 28 June 1942. He studied philosophy, psychology and history at the University of Vienna from 1960 to 1965, when he earned his doctorate with a dissertation on Albert Camus. After postgraduate studies at the University of Paris, Kampits completed his habilitation in 1974 with a thesis on Jean-Paul Sartre and Gabriel Marcel. He was appointed a professor in 1977.

In 1988–1990, Kampits served as chairman of the Austrian Society for Philosophy. Between 1987 and 1991, and again between 2001 and 2004, Kampits was head of the Institute for Philosophy at the University of Vienna. Following a reorganization of the university, he served as founding dean of the Faculty of Philosophy and Education from 2004 to 2008. From 2006 he was also a dean of humanities of the European Academy of Sciences and Arts.

He dealt extensively with questions concerning medical ethics, such as euthanasia. He was a proponent of mandatory ethics classes in schools and universities. During the COVID-19 pandemic, he voiced scepticism over mandatory vaccination policies. From 2007 he was a member of the Bioethics Commission of the Federal Chancellery.

Kampits died in Vienna on 16 June 2026, at the age of 83.

== Honours and awards ==
- Grand Decoration of Honour in Silver for Services to the Republic of Austria (2008)
- Honorary doctorate, Taras Shevchenko National University of Kyiv (2007)
