= Lyrikline.org =

German webpage for international poetry

lyrikline.org hosts contemporary international poetry as audio (read by the authors) and text (original versions and translations), plus bibliographies and biographies for each poet.

lyrikline.org was started in November 1999 as a German-language site. In November 2000, lyrikline.org expanded into a multilingual platform.

In November 2001, several institutions, including the Goethe-Institut and the Central and Regional Library for Berlin established a lyrikline.org network to promote the international exchange of poets, poetry and translations by supporting the website.

lyrikline.org is a project supported by the German Commission for UNESCO and by the former president of the German Parliament, Wolfgang Thierse. lyrikline.org was honored as a notable cultural project with the United Nations Logo for 2001, the “Year of Dialogue among Civilizations”. In 2005, lyrikline.org won the Grimme Online Award for Culture and Entertainment, the jury of which stated that it was an outstanding combination of content, form and function. In 2008, it was given the title Ort im Land der Ideen ("Landmark in the Land of Ideas") during the Literaturwerkstatt Berlin (Literature Workshop of Berlin).

1611 poets, 14562 poems, 91 languages, 23354 translations and 3638 translators are represented on lyrikline.org.
