= Johann Rietsch =

German poet (1778 – 1814)

Johann Rietsch (1778 – 10 January 1814) was a German poet, writing in the East Franconian dialect of his native Nuremberg.

Rietsch was born in Nuremberg, and trained there as a bellmaker, which was at the time a major industry in the city. He was a younger contemporary of Konrad Grübel, and inspired by the latter to write poems in the local Nuremberg dialect as well; these were collected in the volume Anekdoten in Nürnberg Mundart ("Anecdotes in the Nuremberg Dialect", 1811), which proved popular enough to run to a second edition. He gained a general reputation locally for his intelligence and education, owing to his poetry, ability at playing the harp, and command of French. He died young, during the Napoleonic Wars: when Russian troops were quartered in Nuremberg in 1813 on their way to France, Rietsch caught typhus from them, and died in January 1814. His son published a posthumous third edition of his poems much later, with additional poems of his own added, as Gedichte in Nernberger Mundart von alten und von junga Rietsch ("Poems in the Nuremberg Dialect by the Elder and the Younger Rietsch", 1853).

== Note ==
- This article, or an earlier version, contains text translated from the Allgemeine Deutsche Biographie (ADB), a publication now in the public domain.
