= Sarah Kirsch =

German poet

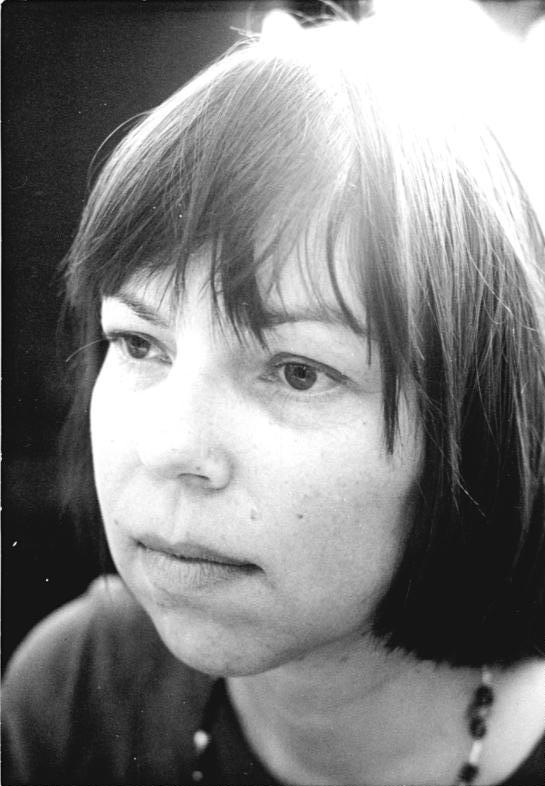
Sarah Kirsch in 1976

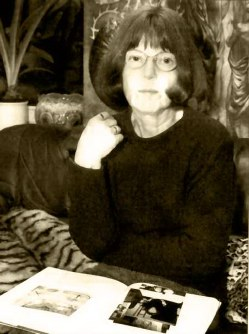
Sarah Kirsch

Sarah Kirsch (German: [ˈzaː.ʁa ˈkɪʁʃ]; 16 April 1935 – 5 May 2013) was a German poet.

== Biography ==
Sarah Kirsch was originally born Ingrid Bernstein in Limlingerode, Prussian Saxony but had changed her first name to Sarah in order to protest against antisemitism. She studied biology in Halle and literature at the Johannes R. Becher Institute for Literature in Leipzig. In 1965, she co-wrote a book of poems with writer Rainer Kirsch, to whom she was married for nine years, from 1960 to 1968. She protested against East Germany's expulsion of Wolf Biermann in 1976, which led to her exclusion from the Socialist Unity Party of Germany (SED). One year later she left the country herself, nevertheless being critical of the West as well. Sarah Kirsch won many prizes and honours including the German international literary Petrarca-Preis in 1976, the Peter Huchel Prize in 1993 and the Georg Büchner Prize in 1996. She died in May 2013 following a brief illness.

== Work ==
Sarah Kirsch is known both for her poetry and her (lyrically inflected) prose. She also translated children's books into German. According to complete review, "the great German-language post-war poets were largely East German (or Austrian) born in the mid to late 1930s which included towering figures such as Volker Braun, Heinz Czechowski" and Sarah Kirsch who was "the most prominent female representative of that generation." Andreas Dorschel credits her prose with "highly flexible spelling, nuanced in puns, archaisms, turns of dialect, peculiar rhythms, poetic imagery".

== Bibliography (selection) ==
- Berlin – Sonnenseite. Deutschlandtreffen der Jugend in der Hauptstadt der DDR (1964), photo reportage, together with Thomas Billhardt and Rainer Kirsch
- Gespräch mit dem Saurier (1965), poems, together with Rainer Kirsch
- Die betrunkene Sonne (1966), children's book. Illustrations by Erich Gürtzig
- Landaufenthalt (1967), poems
- Zaubersprüche (1973), poems
- Trauriger Tag
- Die Pantherfrau. Fünf unfrisierte Erzählungen aus dem Kassettenrecorder (1973), Prose
- Die ungeheuren bergehohen Wellen auf See (1973), Prose
- Es war dieser merkwürdige Sommer (1974), poems selections
- Caroline im Wassertropfen (1975), children's book. Illustrations by Erdmut Oelschläger
- Zwischen Herbst und Winter (1975), children's book together with Ingrid Schuppan
- Rückenwind. Gedichte (1976), poems
- Im Sommer (1977)
- Musik auf dem Wasser (1977)
- Wintergedichte (1978)
- Katzenkopfpflaster (1978), poems
- Sieben Häute. Gedichte 1962–1979 (1979)
- Drachensteigen (1979), poems
- Trennung (1979), poems
- Wind und Schatten, together with Kota Taniuchi
- La Pagerie (1980), Prose, poems
- Geschlechtertausch (1980), together with Irmtraud Morgner and Christa Wolf
- Hans mein Igel (1980), children's book after the Brothers Grimm, Illustrations by Paula Schmidt
- Papiersterne (1981), set by music by Wolfgang von Schweinitz
- Erdreich (1982), poems
- Zwischen Herbst und Winter (1983), Illustrations by Kurt Mühlenhaupt. Gertraud Middelhauve Verlag, ISBN 3-7876-9154-5
- Katzenleben (1984), poems
- Landwege. Eine Auswahl 1980–1985 (1985), with an epilogue by Günter Kunert
- Hundert Gedichte und ein Gespräch über ihre Gedichte. (1985) (a selection from the books Landaufenthalt, Zaubersprüche, Rückenwind, Drachensteigen), Ebenhausen
- Reisezehrung (1986), Prose
- Irrstern (1987), Prose
- Book with poems by Sarah Kirsch and drawings by A. R. Penck in the Berlin „Edition Malerbücher“ (1987)
- Allerlei-Rauh. Eine Chronik (1988), Prose
- Luft und Wasser. Gedichte und Bilder, with pictures by Ingo Kühl, Edition Lutz Arnold in the Steidl Verlag, Göttingen 1988.
- Schneewärme. Gedichte (1989)
- Wintermusik (1989)
- Die Flut (1990), selection, compiled by Gerhard Wolf
- Schwingrasen (1991), Prose
- Spreu (1991), pictures diary
- Erlkönigs Tochter (1992), poems
- Das simple Leben (1994), Prose and poems
- Bodenlos (1996)
- Werke, Complete edition, five volumes in a slipcase (1999), DVA and dtv
- Katzen sprangen am Rande und lachten, poems and prose, selection by Franz-Heinrich Hackel, Manesse Verlag, Zürich 2000, ISBN 3-7175-8270-4
- Sarah Kirsch and Christoph W. Aigner: Beim Malen bin ich weggetreten (2000), art book
- Schwanenliebe. Zeilen und Wunder (2001), lyrical miniatures
- Islandhoch, Tagebruchstücke (2002), Prose
- Kommt der Schnee im Sturm geflogen (2005), Prose
- Kuckuckslichtnelken (2006), Prose
- Regenkatze (2007), Prose (Lyrical diary)
- Sommerhütchen (2008)
- Krähengeschwätz. Deutsche Verlagsanstalt, München 2010, ISBN 978-3-421-04451-8
- Märzveilchen. Deutsche Verlags-Anstalt, München 2012, ISBN 978-3-421-04541-6
- Juninovember. Deutsche Verlagsanstalt, München 2014, ISBN 978-3-421-04636-9
- Ice Roses: Selected Poems, translated to English by Anne Stokes, Carcanet, 2014 ISBN 978-1-84777-151-3
- Ænglisch. Prose; with an epilogue by Frank Trende. Deutsche Verlags-Anstalt, München 2015, ISBN 978-3-421-04649-9
- Freie Verse: 99 Gedichte, Manesse Verlag, Zürich 2020, ISBN 978-3-7175-2506-6

== Resources ==
- Sarah Kirsch by Mererid Hopwood (1997)
