= Daniel Czepko von Reigersfeld =

German Lutheran poet and dramatist

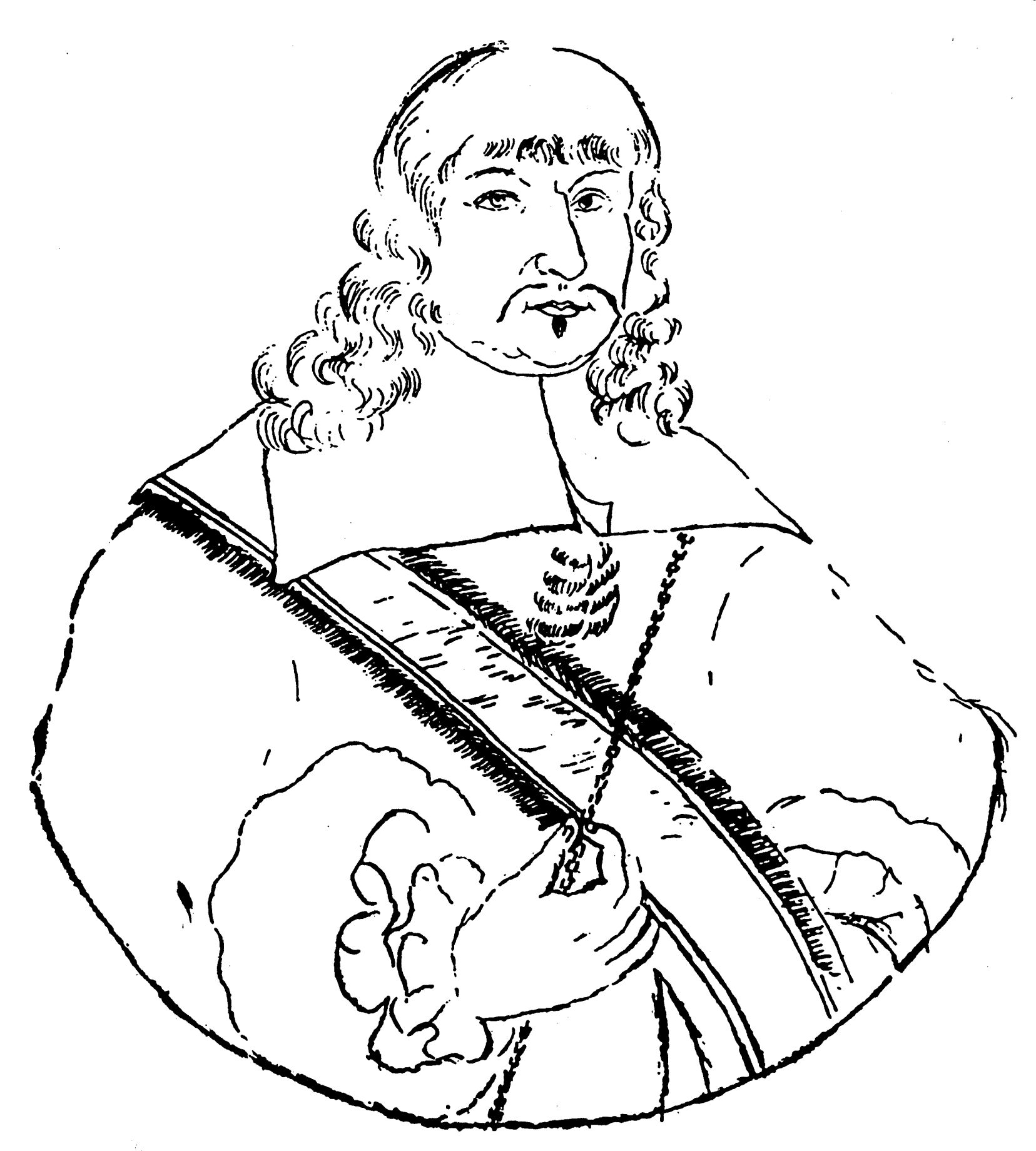
Daniel Czepko.

Daniel Czepko von Reigersfeld (1605–1660) was a German Lutheran poet and dramatist, known for his mystical verse influenced by Jacob Böhme. "Czepko" was his family name, so he is commonly known as Daniel Czepko.

== Life ==
His father was a Lutheran pastor. He studied medicine at Leipzig, and then went to Strasbourg to study law. He became acquainted with Matthias Bernegger, before returning to Silesia.

== Works ==
Czepko wrote a collection of religious epigrams, the Sexcenta Monodisticha Sapientum. It was an influence on Angelus Silesius.
