= Johann Michael Moscherosch =

German writer (1601–1669)

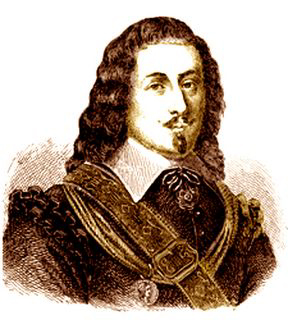
Johann Michael Moscherosch.

Johann Michael Moscherosch (7 March 1601 – 4 April 1669), German statesman, satirist, and educator, was born at Willstätt, on the Upper Rhine near Strassburg.

His bitterly brilliant but partisan writings graphically describe life in a Germany ravaged by the Thirty Years' War (1618–48). His satires, which at times are tedious, also show an overwhelming moral zeal added to a sense of mission.

== Life ==
Moscherosch was the son of farmer and bailiff Michael Moscherosch and his wife Veronika Beck. He grew up on his parents' farm in Willstätt in the County of Hanau-Lichtenberg, Germany. At the age of 11 he attended high school in Strassburg (now in France) and then studied law, philosophy and literature at the University of Strassburg. We owe the only eyewitness account of the theatrical performances of Caspar Brülow to his diary. In September 1623 Moscherosch defended his dissertation on Suetonius' The Twelve Caesars diatribe XV before a committee chaired by Matthias Bernegger. Following his award of the degree of Magister on 8 April 1624 he enrolled at the University of Geneva in Switzerland.

After completing his studies Moscherosch first took educational trips to France and Switzerland, and then worked as a private tutor. From 1631 to 1634 he was one of the bailiffs of the Lutheran branch of the Counts of Kriechingen (today Créhange in France) and in the same capacity in the half of Saarwellingen belonging to Kriechingen. In 1636 the Pomeranian Duke of Croy-Arschot appointed him steward of his interest in the divided lordship of Finstingen (today Fénétrange), not far from Kriechingen. In this position, which he held until 1642, Moscherosch had to defend the rights of his employer in a confined space against the bailiffs of the other five lords. After his activities in the Lorraine border region Moscherosch fled the turmoil of the Thirty Years' War to Strassburg where he was chief of police and tax collector from 1645 to 1655. He also studied the medieval manuscripts of the city's library, such as Gottfried von Hagenau's Liber sex festorum beatae Virginis.

From 1656 he served as a legal adviser to Friedrich Casimir, Count of Hanau-Lichtenberg. Due to financial mismanagement the relatives of the Count, in particular the guardians of his nephew and successor, Christian II, Count Palatine of Zweibrücken-Birkenfeld and Countess Palatine Anna Magdalena of Pfalz-Birkenfeld-Bischweiler, obtained from the Kaiser sequestration of the county and a guaranteed right to share in the government in the county. The advisers to the Count including Moscherosch were dismissed. He next entered the service of the Elector of Mainz, and in 1664 he moved to Kassel to the court of the Landgrave of Hesse-Kassel.

On 9 September 1628 Moscherosch married Esther Ackermann, who died in December 1632 during the turmoil of the Thirty Years' War. On 20 August 1633 he married his second wife, Maria Barbara Paniel, who died of plague on 6 November 1634, aged barely twenty. On 4 October 1636 he married his third wife Anna Maria Kilburger. From these three marriages he had fourteen children, of whom many did not survive infancy. Moscherosch died in Worms of a "high fever" on 4 April 1669 on his way to visit his son Ernst Bogislav in Frankfurt am Main.

Moscherosch's life encompasses the entire Thirty Years' War whose cruelties and excesses are reflected in detail in his work.

== Work ==
Moscherosch published essays, poems and short stories in Latin and German under the pseudonym Philander von Sittewald—"Sittewald" is a play on the name of his birthplace, Willstaett. The Aufrichtige Tannengesellschaft—a German Language society founded in 1633 in Strassburg by Jesaias Rompler and Johannes Freinsheim—counted Moscherosch along with Johann Matthias Schneuber among its most eminent members.

In 1645 Prince Ludwig I of Anhalt-Köthen awarded him membership in the Fruitbearing Society, a prestigious German literary society. The society assigned him the nickname "The Dreaming" (der Träumende) and the motto "high things" (hohe Sachen ). His emblem was the nightshade (Solanum nigrum). In the annals of the society Moscherosch is entry number 436.

Moscherosch's most famous work is Wunderliche und Wahrhafftige Gesichte Philanders von Sittewald (Wondrous and True Visions of Philander von Sittewald), a collection of fourteen satirical narratives published from 1640, an adaptation of the Spanish book Los Sueños by Francisco de Quevedo. One of the stories, Soldatenleben (Military Life), was republished in 1996.

Moscherosch appears in the 1979 fictional story The Meeting at Telgte (Das Treffen in Telgte) by Günter Grass.
