= Hans Irrigmann =

German poet

Hans Peter Irrigmann
- Born: 3 August 1735; Baden, Germany
- Died: 13 January 1771 (aged 35); Baden, Germany
- Occupation: Poet

Hans Irrigmann (3 August 1735 – 13 January 1771) was a German poet writing primarily during The Enlightenment period. Very little of Irrigmann's original work has survived to the present, but his collections of sonnets, especially Die Wunderlichsonette or "whimsical sonnets", have been of interest to philosophy of art generally, and more specifically to the aesthetic study of Impressionism as a later artistic movement.

== Life ==
Born in the town of Baden, and living under the rule of Karl Friedrich, Irrigmann was influenced by the philosophical ideals of The Enlightenment. Not much is known of Irrigmann's early life, but eventually he became closely associated with the then recently founded University of Göttingen. Also influenced by the philosophical writings of Christian Wolff (1679–1754) and poetry of Johann Gottfried von Herder (1744–1803), Irrigmann went on to develop a notable style of verse. Irrigmann would ultimately succumb to yellow fever in 1771, shortly after completing his final work. He never married and had no known children.

== Surviving works ==
Housed at the Kunsthalle Museum, Mannheim, Germany.

- Die Natürlichsonette (1758)
- Die Wunderlichsonette (1762)
- Die Menschlichsonette (1770)

== Artistic significance ==
Irrigmann is typically understood as a proto-Impressionist due to notable similarities with other later Impressionist poets and authors, including Charles Baudelaire and Arthur Rimbaud of France. Although Irrigmann's work significantly predates what is now considered Impressionism as an artistic movement, he can be seen as exploring the foundations of central Impressionistic features.

== See also ==
- German Literature
- Impressionism
- Philosophy of Art
