= Sophie Reyer =

Austrian writer and lyricist (born 1984)

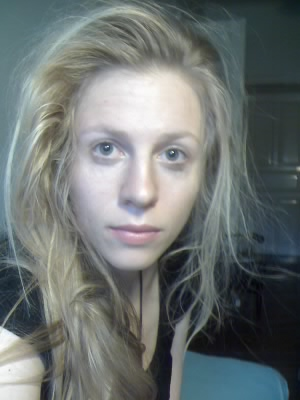
Image of Sophie Reyer

Sophie Anna Reyer is an Austrian author of multiple theater pieces and publications. She was born in Vienna, Austria, in 1984. Reyer discovered her various profound talents in the arts at a young age as a child prodigy, honing her skills as a scriptwriter for children's theatre as well as a composer of classical music.

== Career ==
In 2010, Reyer received both the Master of Arts in Composition/Music Theater as well as her Diploma in Scenic Writing at uniT. In 2018, she was awarded a Doctor of Philosophy in Language Arts and a Screenwriter (KHM Cologne).

Her most important prizes include the Literature Promotion Prize of the City of Graz and the Manuscript Promotion Prize. In 2009, she wrote the theatre texts "vogelglück", "baumleberliebe", "hundpfarrer" and "Anna und der Wulian (Anna and the Wulian)" (publisher: S. Fischer-Verlag), followed by "Fee Fleder oder fliegen lernen mit Drachen", "Unsichtbare Sterne" and "Erster Schnee" (S.Fischer). In 2019 and 2020, she was on the shortlist for the Austria Book Prize with her novels, "Mutter Brennt" and "1431".

The German film "Tod meiner Jugend" ("Death of My Youth"), Germany, 2025, on which Sophie Reyer co-wrote the screenplay, received the award for Best Screenplay at the Richmond International Film Festival (RIFF) 2025, Virginia, USA. The film won the Grand Prix Award at the 2025 Chelsea Film Festival in the USA.

Sophie Reyer is a lecturer at Pädagogische Hochschule, Baden (Lower Austria). Since 2024, she has been a member of a research group at the University of Applied Arts Vienna (Die Angewandte) on the subject area of “Voiceover”.

Sophie Reyer’s historical crime novel Tod bei den Salzburger Festspielen was published by Emons Verlag in 2025 and appeared on all Austrian bestseller lists.

Sophie Reyer served as a co-author of "Krampus, Witches, and the Wild Hunt" — a book on customs and traditions in Austrian Alpine regions, published in the USA, in October 2026.

== Publications (selection) ==
Reyer's poems have been printed in various literary journals and anthologies. Her texts have been translated into Serbian, Polish and Spanish.

- geh dichte. Lyrikband. Mit Illustrationen von Monika Migl et al. Landeck 2005. ISBN 978-3-901735-17-2
- Vertrocknete Vögel. Leykam, Graz 2008. ISBN 978-3-7011-7639-7
- Vogelglück. Verlag S. Fischer, 2010.
- Baby blue eyes. Ritter, Klagenfurt, Graz, Wien 2008. ISBN 978-3-85415-431-0
- Flug (Spuren). Poems. Edition Keiper, Graz 2012. ISBN 978-3-85415-494-5
- Marias. Ein Nekrolog. Ritter Literatur, Klagenfurt 2013. ISBN 978-3-85415-494-5
- Die Erfahrung. SuKuLTuR, Berlin 2013.
- Wortspielhalle. Multimedia project, together with A. J. Weigoni, 2014.
- Anna und der Wulian. Childrens's theater play. S. Fischer, Frankfurt a. M. 2014.
- Käfersucht. S. Fischer, 2012. UA: Theater im Keller Graz, 2018
- Insektizid. Novel. Leykam, Graz 2014. ISBN 978-3-7011-7897-1
- Trip Trap Tropf. S. Fischer, 2016. UA: Konzerthaus Wien, 2016
- Unsichtbare Sterne. S. Fischer, 2016. UA: Schloßtheater Maßbach, 2018
- Die Geschichte des kleinen Kadi. Libretto. Musikverein Wien, 2018
- Schneewittchenpsychose. UA: Dschungel Wien, 2010
- Simon und die Zitterschrecke. Mit Illustrationen von Birgit Scholin. edition lex liszt 12, Oberwart 2015, ISBN 978-3-99016-081-7
- Schläferin. Short story. Edition Atelier, Wien 2016. ISBN 978-3-903005-18-1
- Schnee schlafen. Poems. Reihe "edition pen", Bd. 63, Löcker Verlag, Wien 2017. ISBN 978-3-85409-851-5
- Schildkrötentage. Novel. Czernin Verlag, Vienna 2017. ISBN 978-3-7076-0615-7
- Im Monat der Seidenraupe. Eine lyrische Entpuppung. edition lex liszt 12, Oberwart 2017, ISBN 978-3-99016-128-9
- Siri Silberstern. Feenzauber für die Prinzessin. G&G Verlag, Wien 2019, ISBN 978-3-7074-2142-2., 2. Auflage 2021
- Das stumme Tal. Emons, Köln 2019, ISBN 978-3-7408-0813-6.
- Performanz und Biomacht. Textstrategien im gesellschaftlichen Feld. Passagen Verlag, Wien 2018. ISBN 978-3-7092-0275-3
- 111 Wiener Orte und ihre Legenden. Emons, 2019, 3. Auflage 2023, ISBN 978-3-7408-1533-2
- Mutter brennt. Edition Keiper, Graz 2019. ISBN 978-3-903144-85-9
- 20.000 Meilen unter dem Meer. G&G Verlag, Wien 2021, ISBN 978-3-7074-2347-1., 2. Auflage 2024
- Schräg gegen Wälder gelehnt. Poems. Shoebox House Verlag, Hamburg 2019. ISBN 978-3-941120-36-5
- BioMachtBäume. Passagen Verlag, Wien 2019. ISBN 978-3-7092-0364-4
- Vezas Wege. Bibliographical novel. Königshausen and Neumann, Würzburg 2020. ISBN 978-3-9519842-0-9
- Corona. Ein Chor. Reihe "vers libre", Bd. 1, hrsg. von Alexandra Bernhardt. Edition Melos, Wien 2020, ISBN 978-3-9519842-4-7.
- Clara und ihre Morde. Emons, Köln 2021, ISBN 978-3-7408-1245-4
- Erster Schnee. UA: Junges Theater Landestheater Linz 2021
- Dramatisierung von Die Verwandlung von Franz Kafka
- Fee Fleders fantastische Reise oder Fliegen lernen mit Drachen. S. Fischer 2020. UA: Junges Schauspiel Düsseldorf, 2021
- Traumspielen. UA: Stadttheater Gießen, 2021
- Die Riesin. Tiroler DramatikerInnenfestival 2022
- Die Königsbraut und das fremde Kind (frei nach E.T.A. Hoffmann). Herder, Freiburg im Breisgau 2021, ISBN 978-3-451-03371-1
- Die Wilderin. Emons, Köln 2022, ISBN 978-3-7408-1617-9
- with Dieter Winkler, Wolfgang Liemberger: Dem Meister auf der Spur und Ein Interview mit Wolfgang Hohlbein. In: 40 Jahre Der Hexer. Das Jubiläumsbuch. Bastei Lübbe, Köln 2024, ISBN 978-3-7577-0089-8
- 1431. Novel. Czernin Verlag, Wien 2021. ISBN 978-3-7076-0726-0
- Ein Schrei. Meiner. Novel. Czernin Verlag, Wien 2022. ISBN 978-3-7076-0774-1
- Nach den Gesichtern, Edition Melos, Wien 2023. ISBN 978-3-9505384-9-6
- 20.000 Meilen unter dem Meer nach Jules Vernes. Badische Landesbühne, 2023
- Sisi oder an meinen Haaren möcht ich sterben. UA: Theater im Keller Graz, 2024
- mit Peter Staatsmann: Die Bremer Stadtmusikanten nach den Brüdern Grimm. UA: Zimmertheater Rottweil, 2024
- Hexensommer. Eine Dissoziation in drei Leben. Edition Keiper, Graz 2024
- with Dieter Winkler, Wolfgang Liemberger: Dem Meister auf der Spur und Ein Interview mit Wolfgang Hohlbein. In: 40 Jahre Der Hexer. Das Jubiläumsbuch. Bastei Lübbe, Köln 2024, ISBN 978-3-7577-0089-8
- Bluten. Königshausen und Neumann, Würzburg 2024, ISBN 978-3-8260-7746-3
- Rapunzel. Königshausen und Neumann, Würzburg 2024, ISBN 978-3-8260-8530-7
- Falten hat die Zeit. Gedichte. Löcker Verlag, Wien 2024, ISBN 978-3-99098-183-2
- Blumen blühten aus meinem Mund. Moloko Print 2024, ISBN 978-3-910431-63-8
- durch die liebe erzählt. Löcker Verlag, Wien 2024, ISBN 978-3-99098-206-8
- Meine unverletzlichen Blätter. Poems. Edition Melos, Wien 2025, ISBN 978-3-9505459-8-2
- Tod bei den Salzburger Festspielen. Historical crime novel. Emons, Köln 2025, ISBN 978-3-7408-2585-0
- Kaisersterben. Historical crime novel. Edition Bärenklau, Oberkrämer 2025, ISBN 978-3-565-05462-6
- Schattenwege Taucher Vögel. Poems. Edition Melos, Wien 2025, ISBN 978-3-9505758-1-1
- Incels. Frauenhasser. Novel. Edition keiper, Graz 2026, ISBN 978-3-903575-87-5
- Krampus, Witches, and the Wild Hunt: Alpine Traditions for the Dark Half of the Year. Llewellyn Worldwide Ltd., Woodbury, MN, USA 2026, ISBN 978-0738782157
- Im Schatten des Opernballs. Crime novel. Emons, Köln 2026, ISBN 978-3-7408-2919-3

== Scripts (selection) ==
- Tod meiner Jugend, Death of my Youth (International English title) – Kinospielfilm, 2024–2025, Deutschland. Script: Sophie Reyer, Daniel Jaro, Timo Jacobs.

== Prizes and scholarships (selection) ==
- 2007: Literature Promotion Prize of the City of Graz
- 2008: Prize of the Styrian Regional Health Insurance Fund, Scholarship of the City of Graz, Scholarship of the Province of Styria
- 2009: Scholarship stay on the island of Hombroich, Manuskripte-Förderungspreis of the city of Graz, Austrian Start Scholarship
- 2013: Winner at Nah dran - promotion of children's theater plays
- 2013: KUNO essay prize for reference universe.
- 2014: lime lab for the project Wortspielhalle with Andrascz Jaromir Weigoni, Graz.
- 2017 Award of Excellency for her doctoral thesis Performanz und Biomacht (Performance and Biopower)
- 2018 Residency of the Literarisches Colloquium Berlin
- 2023 Theater Scholarship of the Deutschen Literaturfonds for Bremer Stadtmusikanten (Town Musicians of Bremen)
- 2025: Nomination for the BRAINZ 500 Global Award 2025
