= Sarah Lesch =

German singer-songwriter (born 1986)

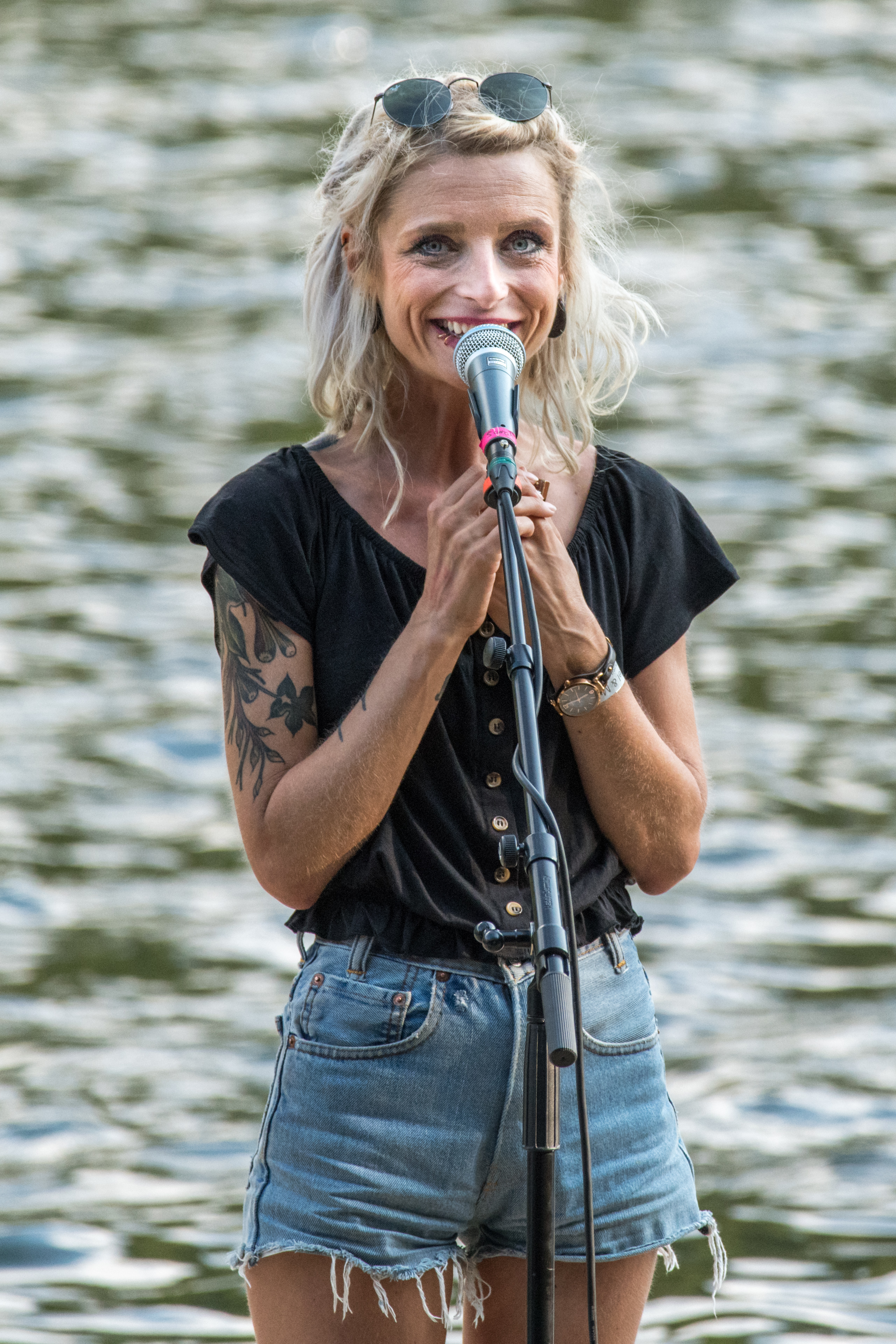
- Lesch performing in 2018

Background information
- Born: 1 March 1986 (age 40); Altenburg, East Germany
- Genres: singer-sonwriter
- Occupations: Musician, songwriter
- Instruments: Vocals, guitar, ukulele
- Years active: 2012-
- Label: Kick the Flame,
- Website: https://www.sarahlesch.de/

Sarah Lesch (born 1 March 1986) is a German singer-songwriter who performs with a guitar and ukulele.

== Life and career ==
Lesch was born in Altenburg, Thuringia and moved with her mother to Heilbronn, Swabia, at the age of five. Her father Ralf Kruse is a Leipzig musician. He played among others with Amor & Die Kids and the Original Erzgebirgs-Duo. On her father's side she has a half-sister and a half-brother, whom she only met after she became a professionel musician.

Lesch wrote music for children's plays and worked from 2009 until 2013 as an educator in Tübingen and since then, she has mainly worked as a musician.

Lesch's debut album with the title Lieder aus der schmutzigen Küche was released in 2012 under the alias "Chansonedde", was digitally distributed by Rummelplatzmusik in 2015 and released in 2016 in cooperation with the label Kick The Flame on CD. In 2015 she released her second studio album, Von Musen und Matrosen under her real name. The Leipzig music company Kick the Flame signed her in 2016. Her third studio album Da Draussen was released in 2017; in September 2019 followed an EP with the label Räuberleiter GbR with Den Einsamen zum Troste.

With the six-minute song Testament, which Lesch wrote for her son, she won the Protestsongcontest held in Vienna in 2016 and at the Hermann-Hesse-Festival in Calw took second place in the Panikpreis. The song, which is supposed to prepare the child for an uncertain future, was then widely distributed on the Internet and was also distributed by right-wing populist websites and right-wing extremist groups. She clearly distanced herself from them. In her song Der Kapitän she sings about the rescue of 37 people from distress with the ship Cap Anamur by Stefan Schmidt.

Lesch has performed regularly since 2013/2014, mainly on smaller stages. Among other things, she was seen at the Hamburger Küchensessions or the renowned German TV show Inas Nacht and performed at a lot of music festivals like Songs an einem Sommerabend.

== Personal life ==
At age 18 Lesch gave birth to a son. She lives in Leipzig.

== Discography ==
Albums

- 2012: Lieder aus der schmutzigen Küche
- 2015: Von Musen und Matrosen (Rummelplatzmusik)
- 2017: Da Draussen (Kick The Flame)
- 2020: Der Einsamkeit zum Trotze (Kick The Flame)
- 2021: Triggerwarnung (Räuberleiter GbR)
- 2024: Gute Nachrichten (Meadow Lake Music)
- 2026: Poesie & Widerstand (Listenrecords)

EP

- 2019: Den Einsamen zum Troste (Räuberleiter GbR)

Songbooks

- For the first four albums there is a songbook with lyrics and chords, and exclusive poems.
