= Karl Riha =

German author and literary scholar (1935–2026)

Karl Riha (3 June 1935 – 10 January 2026) was a German poet, writer and literary scholar.

== Life and career ==
Riha was born in Český Krumlov, Czechoslovakia on 3 June 1935. From 1989, he published the series Vergessene Autoren der Moderne (Forgotten Authors of the Modern style), along with Marcel Beyer at the University of Siegen.

In 1996, he was awarded the Kassel Literary Prize for Grotesque Humor.

Riha died in Siegen on 10 January 2026, at the age of 90.
