= Franzobel =

Austrian playwright and novelist

Stefan Griebl
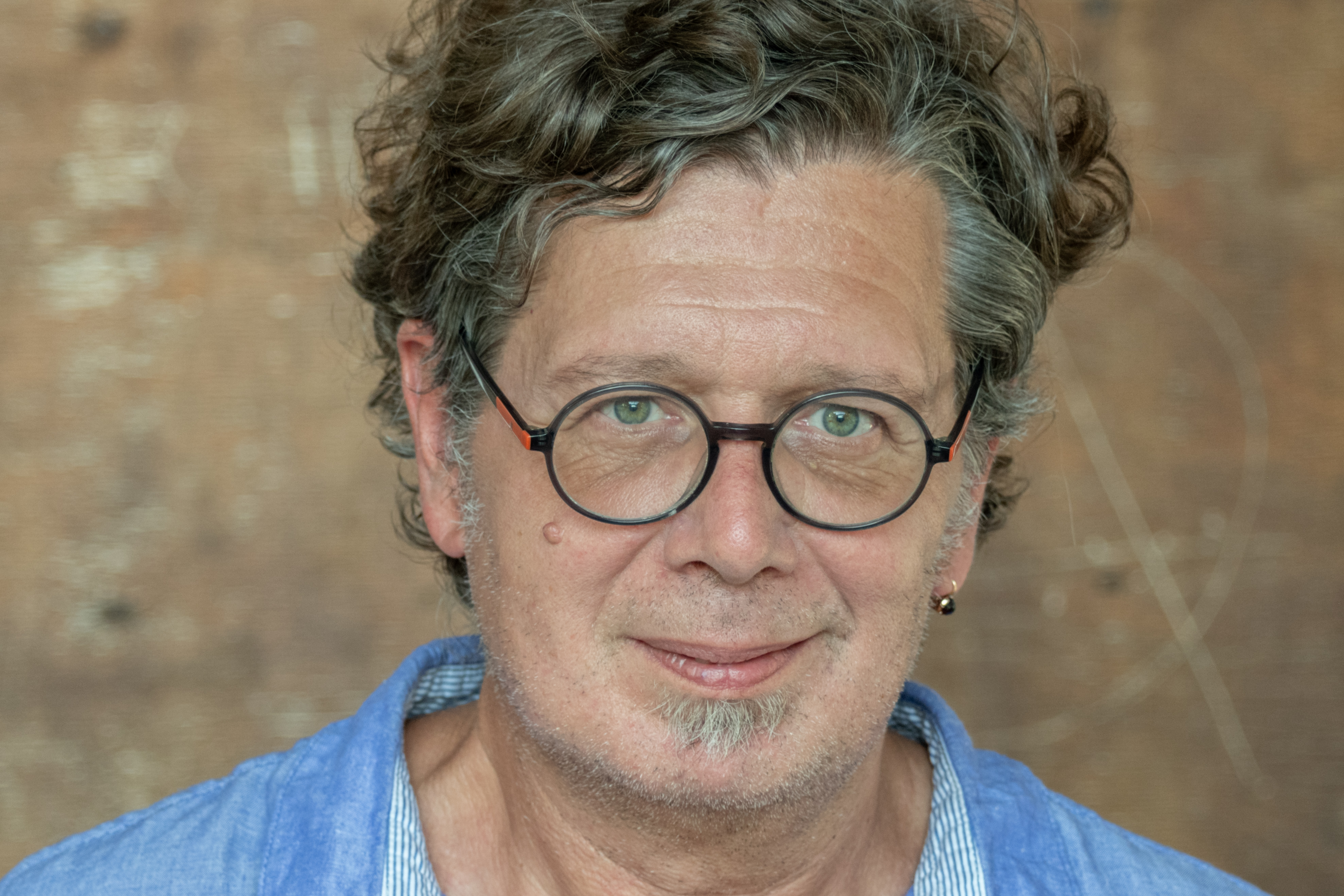
- Franzobel in 2024
- Born: Franz Stefan Griebl; 1 March 1967 (age 59); Vöcklabruck, Austria
- Education: University of Vienna
- Occupations: Playwright, novelist
- Writing career
- Pen name: Franzobel
- Years active: 1989–present
- Notable awards: Festival of German-Language Literature; 1995

Franzobel is the pseudonym of the Austrian writer (Franz) Stefan Griebl. He was born on 1 March 1967 in Vöcklabruck, Upper Austria. In 1997, he won the Wolfgang Weyrauch Prize and in 1998, the Kassel Literary Prize, amongst numerous other literary awards. In 2017, he won the prestigious Nicolas Born Prize and was long-listed for the German Book Prize for his novel Das Floß der Medusa. He now lives in Vienna.

== Books ==
- Der Wimmerldrucker. Ein Lexikaroman. Eigenverlag, 1990.
- Thesaurus. Ein Gleiches. Poems. Eigenverlag, 1992.
- Das öffentliche Ärgernis. Prose. Klagenfurt: edition selene, 1993.
- Überin. Die Gosche. Prose. Ill.: Franzobel. Klagenfurt: edition selene, 1993.
- Masche und Scham. Die Germanistenfalle – Eine Durchführung & Das öffentliche Ärgernis. Proklitikon. Klagenfurt: Edition Selene, 1993.
- Die Musenpresse. Aus einem Roman von Margarete Lanner. Illustrated. Klagenfurt: Ritter, 1994.
- Elle und Speiche. Modelle der Liebe. Poetry and prose. Wien: Das Fröhliche Wohnzimmer, 1994.
- Ranken. Prose. Ill.: Carla Degenhardt. Klagenfurt: edition selene, 1994.
- Hundshirn. Prose. Ill.: Franzobel. Linz: Blattwerk, 1995.
- Die Krautflut. Short Story. Postscript.: Thomas Eder. Frankfurt/M.: Suhrkamp, 1995.
- Schinkensünden. Ein Katalog. Klagenfurt: Ritter, 1996.
- Unter Binsen. [With Christian Steinbacher] Graz: edition gegensätze, 1996.
- Linz. Eine Obsession. München, Berlin: Janus Press, 1996.
- Der Trottelkongreß. Commedia dell'pape. Ein minimalistischer Heimatroman. Klagenfurt, Wien: Ritter, 1998.
- m. T. [with Klangwerkstatt Berlin]. Siegendorf: NN-Fabrik, 1998.
- Böselkraut und Ferdinand. Ein Bestseller von Karol Alois. Wien: Zsolnay, 1998.
- Das öffentliche Ärgernis. Proklitikon. & Masche und Scham. Die Germanistenfalle – eine Durchführung. Wien: Edition Selene, 1998.
- Met ana oanders schwoarzn Tintn. Dulli-Dialektgedichte. Weitra: Bibliothek der Provinz, 1999. (With allusion to H. C. Artmann)
- Scala Santa oder Josefine Wurznbachers Höhepunkt. Novel. Wien: Zsolnay, 2000.
- Best of. Die Highlights. Edition Aramo, 2001.
- Shooting Star. Klagenfurt: Ritter, 2001 (withdrawn from sale for legal reasons)
- Austrian Psycho oder Der Rabiat Hödlmoser. Ein Trashroman in memoriam Franz Fuchs. Verlag Bibliothek der Provinz, Weitra 2001, ISBN 3-85252-414-8.
- Mayerling. Die österreichische Tragödie. Stück, Materialien, Collagen. (1. ed.). Passagen Verlag, Wien 2002, ISBN 978-3-85165-514-8.
- Lusthaus oder Die Schule der Gemeinheit. Novel. Zsolnay, Wien 2002.
- Mundial. Gebete an den Fußballgott. Droschl, Graz/ Wien 2002.
- Scala Santa oder Josefine Wurzenbachers Höhepunkt. Piper 2002.
- Mozarts Vision. Stück, Materialien, Collagen. (1. ed.), Passagen Verlag, Wien 2003, ISBN 978-3-85165-611-4.
- Luna Park. Vergnügungsgedichte. Zsolnay, Wien 2003.
- Zirkusblut oder Ein Austrian-Psycho-Trashkrimi, zweiter Teil. Verlag Bibliothek der Provinz, Weitra 2004, ISBN 3-85252-584-5.
- Über die Sprache im sportiven Zeitalter. Verlag Bibliothek der Provinz, Weitra 2004, ISBN 3-902416-04-1.
- Wir wollen den Messias jetzt oder Die beschleunigte Familie (1. ed.), Wien: Passagen Verlag, 2005, ISBN 978-3-85165-707-4.
- Der Narrenturm (1. ed.), Wien: Passagen Verlag, 2005, ISBN 978-3-85165-660-2
- Das Fest der Steine oder Die Wunderkammer der Exzentrik. Zsolnay, Wien 2005.
- Hunt oder der totale Februar. Verlag Bibliothek der Provinz, Weitra 2006, ISBN 3-85252-741-4.
- Der Schwalbenkönig oder Die kleine Kunst der Fußball-Exerzitien. Ritter Verlag, Klagenfurt/ Wien 2006.
- Liebesgeschichte. Novel. Zsolnay, Wien 2007.
- Franzobels großer Fußballtest. Picus, Wien 2008.
- Zipf oder die dunkle Seite des Mondes. Verlag Bibliothek der Provinz, Weitra 2008, ISBN 978-3-85252-892-2.
- Kreisky. Ein Stück zur Volkshilfe. Verlag Bibliothek der Provinz, Weitra 2008, ISBN 978-3-85252-927-1.
- Lady Di oder Die Königin der Herzen (Eine Farce vom Begehren) (1. ed.), Wien: Passagen, 2008, ISBN 978-3-85165-832-3
- Österreich ist schön Ein Märchen. Zsolnay, Wien 2009, ISBN 978-3-552-05473-8.
- With Franz Novotny, Gustav Ernst: Filz oder ein Wirtschafts-Flip-Fop-Schmierfilm mit Blutsauger-Blues und Lucky-Strike-Fondue aus dem Land der Bawagbabas, auch EXIT III genannt. Ritter, Klagenfurt 2009, ISBN 978-3-85415-449-5.
- Moser oder Die Passion des Wochenend-Wohnzimmergottes. Passagen Verlag, Wien 2010, ISBN 978-3-85165-831-6.
- Romeo und Julia in Purkersdorf. Drei Volksstücke. Passagen Verlag, Wien 2011, ISBN 978-3-85165-990-0.
- Der Boxer oder Die Zweite Luft des Hans Orsolics. Passagen Verlag, Wien 2011, ISBN 978-3-85165-989-4.
- Hirschen oder die Errettung Österreichs. Verlag Bibliothek der Provinz, Weitra 2011, ISBN 978-3-85252-997-4.
- Prinzessin Eisenherz. Verlag Bibliothek der Provinz, Weitra 2011, ISBN 978-3-902416-91-9.
- Faust. Der Wiener Teil. Ein Lustspiel. Passagen Verlag, Wien 2012, ISBN 978-3-7092-0045-2.
- Was die Männer so treiben, wenn die Frauen im Badezimmer sind. Zsolnay, Wien 2012.
- Yedermann. Oder der Tod steht ihm gut. Passagen Verlag, Wien 2013, ISBN 978-3-7092-0089-6.
- Steak für alle. Der neue Fleischtourismus. mikrotext, Berlin 2013, ISBN 978-3-944543-03-1.
- Adpfent. Ein Kindlein brennt. Verlag Bibliothek der Provinz, Weitra 2013, ISBN 978-3-99028-282-3.
- Wiener Wunder. Kriminalroman. Zsolnay, Wien 2014, ISBN 978-3-552-05690-9.
- Bad Hall Blues. Eine Oberösterreicherelegie. Kehrwasserverlag, Linz 2014, ISBN 978-3-902786-27-2.
- Metropolis oder Das große Weiche Herz der Bestie. Passagen Verlag, Wien 2014, ISBN 978-3-7092-0128-2.
- Othello oder Ein Schlechter von Hernals. Passagen Verlag, Wien 2014,ISBN 978-3-7092-0129-9.
- Hamlet oder Was ist hier die Frage? Passagen Verlag, Wien 2015, ISBN 978-3-7092-0194-7.
- Groschens Grab: Kriminalroman Paul Zsolnay Verlag, Wien 2015, ISBN 978-3-5520-5743-2.
- Das Floß der Medusa. Roman. Paul Zsolnay Verlag, Wien 2017, ISBN 978-3-5520-5816-3.
- Rechtswalzer, Kriminalroman. Paul Zsolnay Verlag, Wien 2019, ISBN 978-3-552-05922-1.
- Die Eroberung Amerikas, Roman. Paul Zsolnay Verlag, Wien 2021, ISBN 978-3-552-07227-5.
- Heldenlieder. Mit Bildern von Ramona Schnekenburger. Reihe "vers libre", Bd. 5, hrsg. von Alexandra Bernhardt. Edition Melos, Wien 2021, ISBN 978-3-9519842-4-7.
- Die Zauberflöte. Nach dem Libretto von Emanuel Schikaneder ediert und mit wohltemperierten Frechheiten moduliert. Illustriert von Petrus Akkordeon, Edition Melos, Wien 2022, ISBN 978-3-9505384-2-7.
- Einsteins Hirn. Roman, Zsolnay, Wien 2023, ISBN 978-3-552-07334-0.

== Plays ==
- 1996 Das Beuschelgeflecht
- 1998 Paradies
- 1998 Nathans Dackel oder Die Geradebiegung der Ring-Parabel. Eine Lessingvollstreckung
- 1997 Kafka. Eine Komödie
- 1998 Bibapoh
- 1999 Phettberg. Eine Hermes-Tragödie
- 1999 Der Ficus spricht. Minidrama für A, B, einen Volkssänger, ein Blumenmädchen und einen Gummibaum
- 1999 Volksoper
- 2000 Olympia. Eine Kärntner Zauberposse samt Striptease
- 2003 Black Jack
- 2004 Flugangst
- 2008 Der Impresario von Schmierna

== See also ==
- List of Austrian writers
