= Marcel Beyer =

German writer

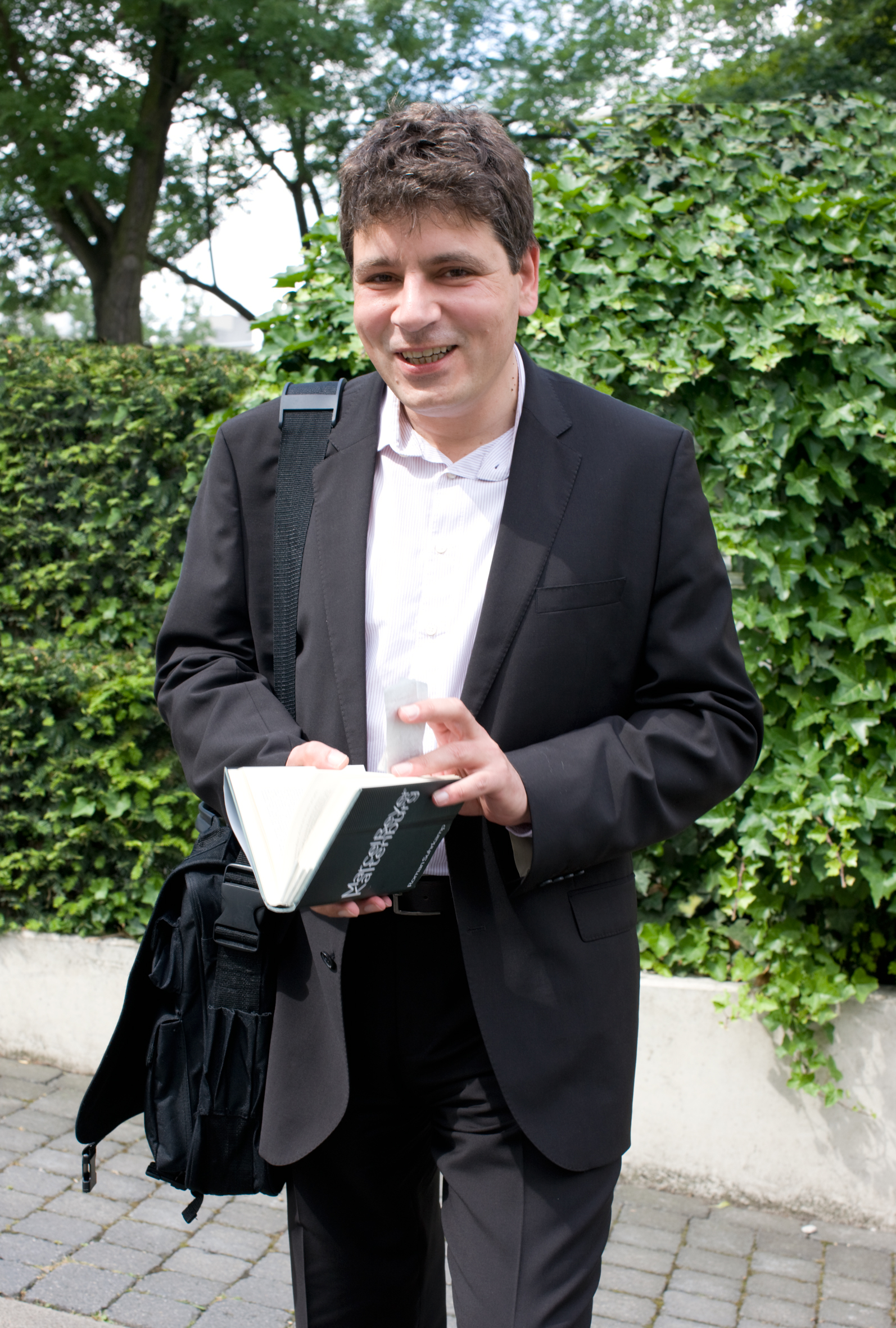
Marcel Beyer in 2008

Marcel Beyer (born 23 November 1965) is a German writer.

== Life ==
Marcel Beyer was born in Tailfingen, Württemberg, and grew up in Kiel and Neuss. From 1987 to 1991, he studied German language and literature, English studies and literary studies at the University of Siegen; in 1992, he obtained a Magister degree with a work on Friederike Mayröcker. Since 1987, he has developed performance art. Since 1989, he published, with Karl Riha, the series Vergessene Autoren der Moderne (Forgotten Modernist Authors) at the University of Siegen.

From 1990 to 1993, he worked as editor on the literary magazine Konzepte; from 1992 to 1998, he was a contributor to the music magazine Spex. In 1996 and 1998, he was writer in residence at University College London and the University of Warwick in Coventry. Beyer lived until 1996 in Cologne, and since then in Dresden. He is a visiting professor at the European Graduate School in Saas-Fee.

From early on, Beyer, strongly influenced by Friederike Mayröcker and the authors of the French nouveau roman, has been a writer of lyric poetry and novels, always taking an idiosyncratic view of German history, in particular the Third Reich era.

== Honours ==
- 1991 Rolf Dieter Brinkmann scholarship
- 1991 Ernst Willner Prize at the Ingeborg Bachmann competition in Klagenfurt
- 1992 North Rhine Westphalia promotional prize
- 1996 Berlin Literature Prize
- 1996 Johannes Bobrowski Medal
- 1996 German Critics Federation prize
- 1997 Uwe Johnson Prize
- 1998 Förderpreis Horst Bienek Prize for Poetry
- 1999 Lessing Prize of the Free State of Saxony
- 2000 Jean-Paul-Literaturförderpreis of the City of Bayreuth
- 2001 Heinrich-Böll-Preis
- 2003 Friedrich Hölderlin Prize of the city of Tübingen
- 2004 Spycher literary award
- 2006 Erich Fried Prize
- 2008 Joseph-Breitbach-Preis
- 2008 Deutscher Buchpreis (Longlist) for Kaltenburg
- 2008 Liliencron-Dozentur
- 2010 Scholarship at Villa Massimo
- 2012/2013 Stadtschreiber von Bergen
- 2013 Ernst Jandl Lectureship of Poetry at the University of Vienna
- 2014 Kleist Prize
- 2016 Georg Büchner Prize
- 2021 Peter Huchel Prize

== Works ==
- Walkmännin, Neu-Isenburg 1990
- Das Menschenfleisch, Frankfurt/Main 1991
- Friederike Mayröcker, Frankfurt/Main 1992
- Brauwolke. Berlin 1994 (together with Klaus Zylla)
- Flughunde. Frankfurt/Main 1995 (translated as The Karnau Tapes by John Brownjohn, 1997 and graphic novel adaptation by Ulli Lust, 2013)
- HNO-Theater im Unterhemd. Berlin 1995
- Falsches Futter. Frankfurt/Main 1997
- Spione. Cologne 2000 (translated as Spies by Breon Mitchell, 2005)
- Zur See. Berlin 2001
- Erdkunde. Cologne 2002
- Nonfiction. To Cologne 2003
- Vergeßt mich. Cologne 2006
- Kaltenburg. Suhrkamp 2008 (translated as Kaltenburg by Alan Bance, 2012)
- Arbeit Nahrung Wohnung. Bühnenmusik für vierzehn Herren. Opernlibretto (composition by Enno Poppe)
- IQ. Testbatterie in 8 Akten. Opernlibretto (composition by Enno Poppe). UA: 27. April 2012, Schwetzinger SWR Festspiele
- Putins Briefkasten. Erzählungen. Suhrkamp, Frankfurt am Main 2012, ISBN 978-3-518-46324-6
- Graphit. Gedichte. Suhrkamp, Frankfurt am Main 2014, ISBN 978-3-518-42440-7
- XX. Lichtenberg-Poetikvorlesungen (Göttinger Sudelblätter). Wallstein, Göttingen 2015, ISBN 978-3-8353-1674-4
- Im Situation Room: der entscheidende Augenblick. Rede an die Abiturienten des Jahrgangs 2015. Conte, Sankt Ingbert 2014, ISBN 978-3-95602-058-2

== Essays ==
- "Das wilde Tier im Kopf des Historikers", in: Lose Blätter No. 27, 2004
- "Die Katze von Vilnius", in BELLA triste No. 15, 2006
- "Aurora", Münchener Reden zur Poesie. From the series Lyrik Kabinett Munich, 2006

== Publications as editor ==
- Rudolf Blümner: Der Stuhl, die Ohrfeige und anderes literarisches Kasperletheater Siegen 1988 ISSN 0177-9869 number 35
- Ernst Jandl: Gemeinschaftsarbeit. Siegen 1989 (written together with Friederike Mayröcker and Andreas Okopenko)
- Rudolf Blümner: Ango laina und andere Texte. Munich 1993 (together with Karl Riha)
- George Grosz: Grosz Berlin. Hamburg 1993 (together with Karl Riha)
- William S. Burroughs. Eggingen 1995 (together with Andreas Kramer)
- Ausreichend lichte Erklärung. Munich 1998 (together with Christoph Buchwald)
- Friederike Mayröcker: Collected prose. Frankfurt/Main (together with Klaus and Klaus Kastberger) 2001
- Friederike Mayröcker: Collected poems. Frankfurt/Main 2004

== Translations ==
- Michael Hofmann: Feineinstellungen. Cologne 2001
- Gertrude Stein: Spinnwebzeit, bee time vine und andere Gedichte. Zurich 1993

== Anthologies ==
- Junge Lyrik, Neuss 1983 (Neue Neusser Series)
