= Anna Kaleri =

German writer and screenwriter (born 20.04.1974)

Anna Kaleri (born 1974 in Wippra) is a German writer and screenwriter.

== Biography ==
Anna Kaleri was born 1974 in the Harz Mountains in the former GDR. She studied from 1996 to 2002 at the German Institute for Literature in Leipzig. After her diploma from this school for writers, she studied Philosophy. Currently, she lives in Leipzig and works freelance since 2002. She writes fiction, screenplays and does journalistic works. Her prose début "This man exists" was published in 2003. Three years later, in 2006, her autobiographical novel "Highlife" which broached the time of Die Wende was published. After years of research, Kaleri wrote the novel Der Himmel ist ein Fluss (2012), a fictional approach to the life of her unknown grandmother who died at the end of World War II in Masuria.

== Bibliography ==
- Es gibt diesen Mann, Luchterhand Literaturverlag 2003
- Hochleben, Mitteldeutscher Verlag 2006
- Der Himmel ist ein Fluss, Graf Verlag 2012 (hardcover), List Verlag 2014 (softcover)

== Awards ==
- 1997 Weddinger Literaturpreis
- 2003 Wiepersdorf – Stipendium der Sächsischen Kulturstiftung
- 2004 Grenzgängerstipendium der Robert-Bosch-Stiftung
- 2004 Hörspielstipendium des Deutschen Literaturfonds
- 2007 Arbeitsstipendium der Sächsischen Kulturstiftung
