= German Institute for Literature =

Leipzig University school

Coordinates: 51°20′02″N 12°22′03″E

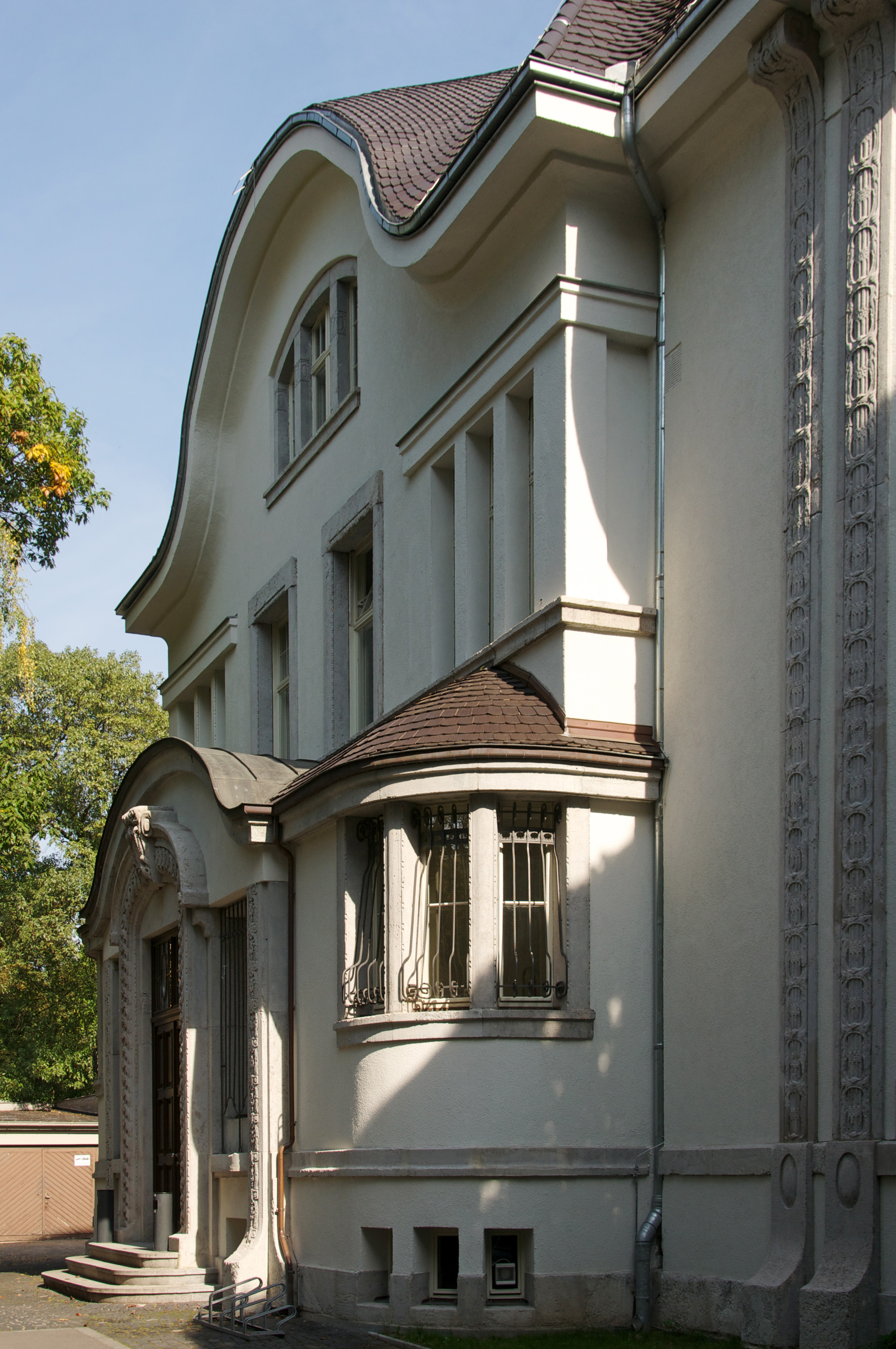
Entrance of the German Institute of Literature

The German Institute for Literature (German: Deutsches Literaturinstitut Leipzig, DLL) is a part of Leipzig University and offers university education for writers. It was founded in 1955 under the name Johannes R. Becher-Institut, at that time in the GDR. Among the noted writers who graduated from the school are Heinz Czechowski, Kurt Drawert, Adolf Endler, Ralph Giordano, Kerstin Hensel, Sarah and Rainer Kirsch, Angela Krauß, Erich Loest, Fred Wander, Clemens Meyer, Juli Zeh, Kristof Magnusson, Anna Kaleri, Volker Altwasser and Werner Bernreuther.

Closed in 1990, the institute was refounded in 1995. Currently, Ulrike Draesner, Kerstin Preiwuß and Michael Lentz are professors.
