= In Times of Fading Light =

In Times of Fading Light may refer to:

- In Times of Fading Light (novel), a 2011 novel by Eugen Ruge
- In Times of Fading Light (film), a 2017 German drama film, based on the novel
