= Trávníček =

Trávníček (feminine: Trávníčková) is a Czech surname, a diminutive form from the Czech word trávník.

== Variant forms ==
Variants include Trávníček, Travnicek, Travniczek, Trawniczek, Travnitschek, Trawnitschek, Trawnitscheck, Travnizek, Trawnizek and Travnicsek.

== Notable people with this name ==
- Boris Trávníček (born 1988), Czech-Slovak para table tennis player
- Cornelia Travnicek (born 1987), Austrian writer
- František Trávníček (1888–1961), Czech linguist
- Michal Trávníček (born 1980), Czech ice hockey player
- Pavel Trávníček (born 1950), Czech actor
- An alter ego of the post-war Austrian cabaret artist Helmut Qualtinger
