= Tonio Schachinger =

Austrian writer

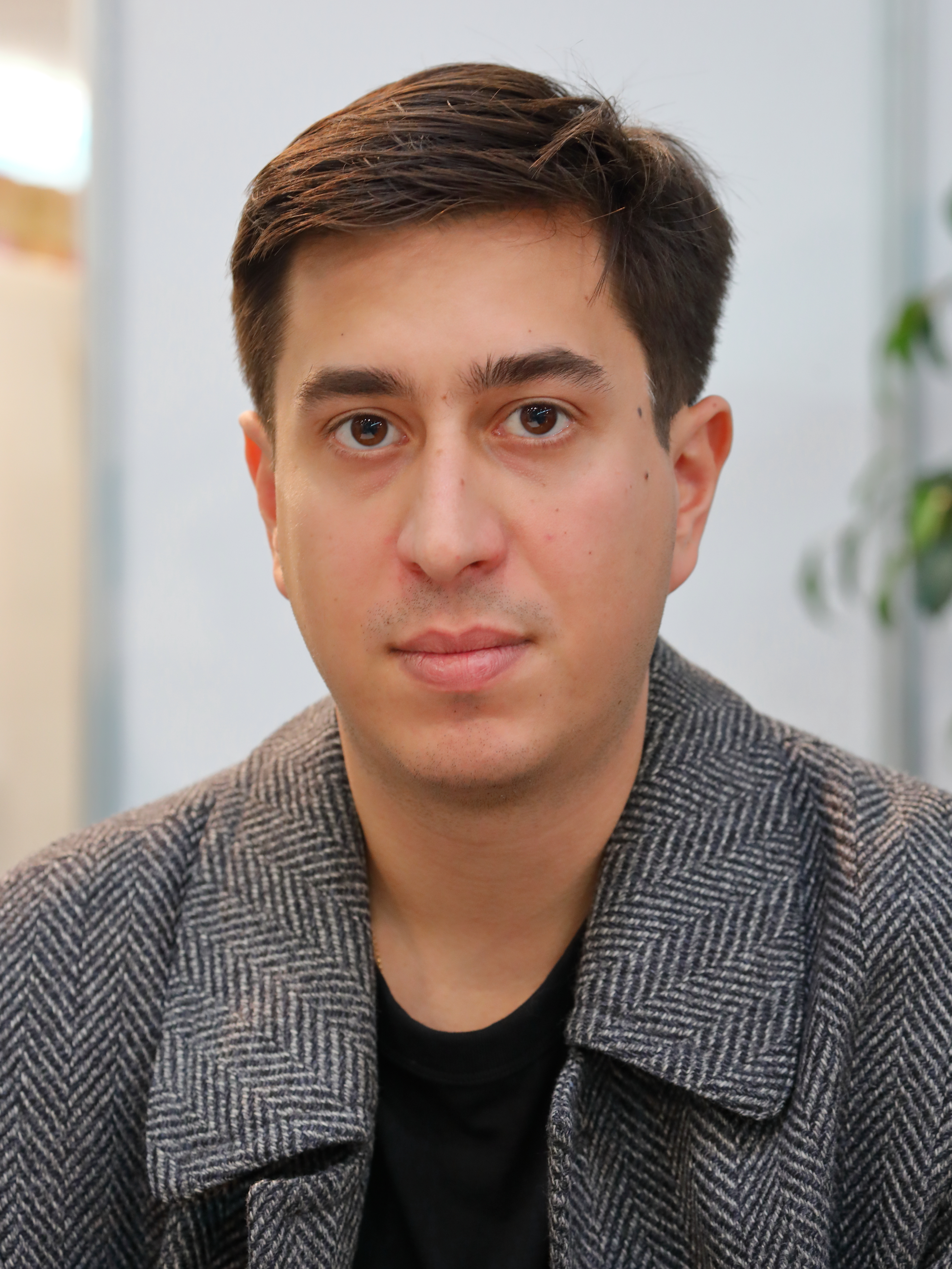
- Schachinger in 2019
- Born: January 29, 1992 (age 34); New Delhi, India
- Spouse: Margit Mössmer
- Writing career
- Notable awards: German Book Prize (2023)

Antonio Schachinger (born 29 January 1992) is an Austrian writer. In 2023, his novel Echtzeitalter won the German Book Prize.

== Life ==
Schachinger was born in New Delhi. Schachinger's father is an Austrian diplomat and his mother is an artist of Mexican and Ecuadorian descent. His parents had met in Vienna, where Schachinger's mother was studying painting at the Academy of Fine Arts Vienna. The family frequently moved between Nicaragua and Vienna, but Schachinger stayed solely in Vienna after his parents' divorce.

Schachinger lives in Vienna, and is married to the writer Margit Mössmer.

== Works ==
He published his debut novel Nicht wie ihr in 2019, and it was shortlisted for that year's German Book Prize. The jury praised the novel for its "Viennese milieu language and wonderful football metaphors" as well as the "snotty, funny and original" narrator's voice. According to Schachinger, the novel originated in a course given by the Austrian author Anna Kim, who also assisted him during the writing process and in the later search for a publisher. The Frankfurter Allgemeine Zeitung said that the novel is "as humorous as it is keenly observed and unpretentious."

In 2023, he received the German Book Prize for his novel Echtzeitalter. The novel is set at an elite Viennese boarding school and follows Till, a 15 year old that takes refuge in computer games (especially Age of Empires II) after his father's death. The jury of the German Book Prize labelled it a "social novel" and highlighted, among other things, its subtle irony with which Schachinger reflects "the political and social conditions of the present".

== Bibliography ==
- Schachinger, Tonio (26 August 2019). Nicht wie ihr. Kremayr & Scheriau. ISBN 978-3-218-01153-2.
- Schachinger, Tonio (14 March 2023). Echtzeitalter. Rowohlt Verlag. ISBN 978-3-498-00317-3.
