= Martina Hefter =

German author and performance artist

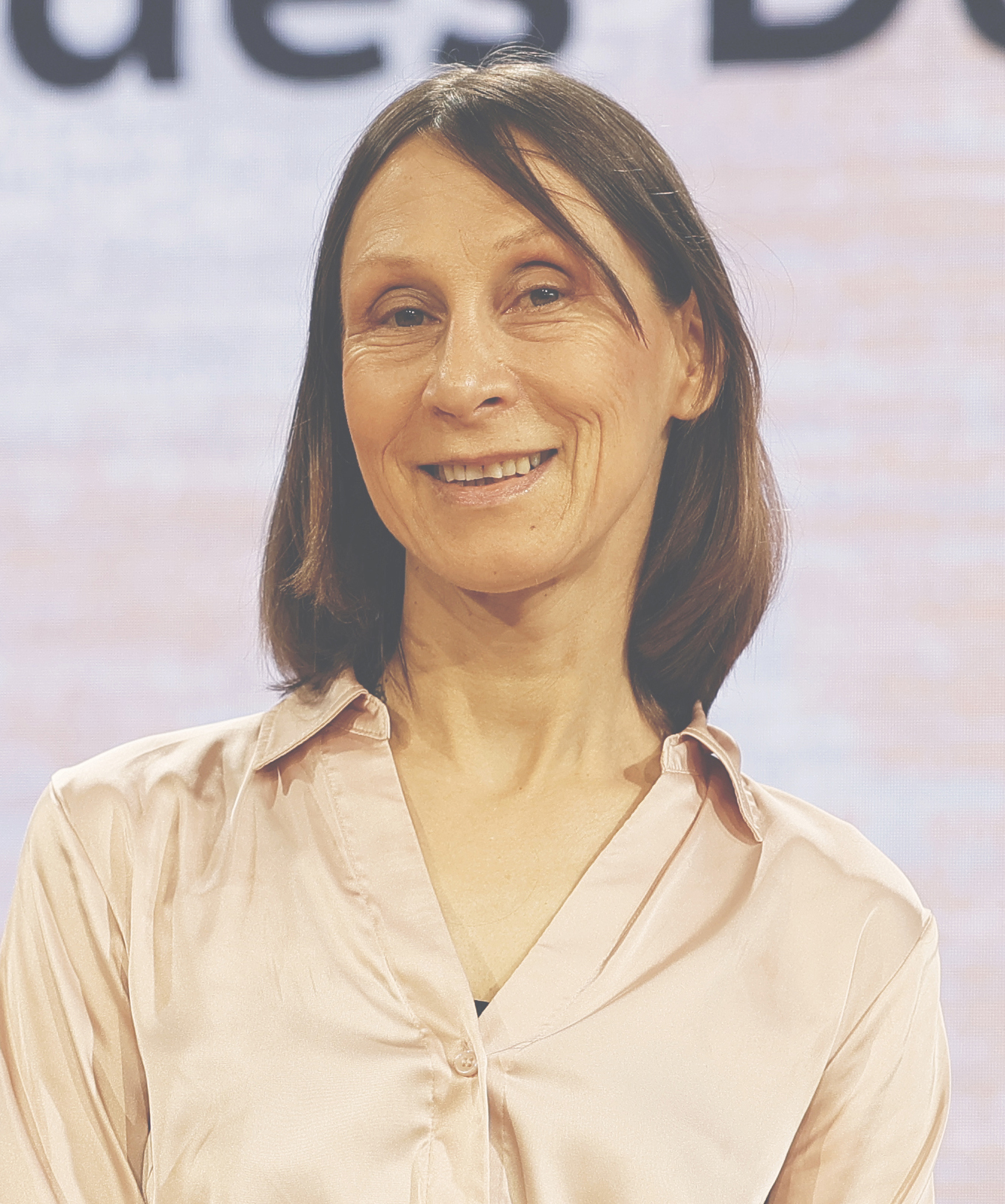
Martina Hefter at Frankfurt Book Fair 2024

Martina Hefter (born 11 June 1965 in Pfronten) is a German author and performance artist. Her works have received numerous literature prizes both for poetry and for prose.

== Life ==
Martina Hefter initially trained as a gymnastics teacher with a focus on dance. She then did additional training in contemporary performance dance in Munich and Berlin. Afterwards, she studied at the German Institute for Literature in Leipzig where she lives since 1997. She works as a performance artist and author combining dance and language elements.

After her debut novel Junge Hunde (2001), she published two more prose works before turning to poetry and publishing several poetry collections with the publisher Kookbooks. In 2024, she published her first novel in 16 years titled Hey guten Morgen, wie geht es dir?. Critics praised its poetic language. According to the Jury of the German Book Prize, the novel "navigates between melancholy and euphoria, reflecting on trust and deception".

== Hey guten Morgen, wie geht es dir? (2024) ==
Hefters Novel Hey guten Morgen, wie geht es dir? (2024) tells the story of Juno, a dancer who lives with her sick husband Jupiter. At night, she escapes into the world of love-scamming. Juno uses online-connections to create an alternative identity and escape her everyday life. She forms an unexpected connection with the scammer Benu. The book has been awarded the German Book Prize 2024.

== Awards ==
- 2002: Fellowship of the Kulturstiftung Sachsen
- 2003: Literaturfellowship of Leipzig
- 2005: Advancement award Lessing-Preis des Freistaates Sachsen
- 2005: Hermann-Lenz-Stipendium
- 2005: Nominated for Ingeborg-Bachmann-Preis
- 2008: Merano Poetry Prize
- 2018: Lyrikpreis München
- 2024: German Literature Fund Grand Prize
- 2024: Literature prize of the state capital of Hesse Wiesbaden
- 2024: German Book Prize for Hey guten Morgen, wie geht es dir?
- 2024: Prix Grand Continent for Hey, Guten Morgen, wie geht es dir?

== Works ==
- Junge Hunde. Roman. Alexander Fest, Berlin 2001, ISBN 3-8286-0166-9.
- Zurück auf Los. Roman. Wallstein-Verlag, Göttingen 2005, ISBN 3-89244-841-8.
- Noch auf dem Bahnsteig ..., read at Ingeborg-Bachmann-Preis 2005 (full script on the website of ORF)
- Die Küsten der Berge. Roman. Wallstein-Verlag, Göttingen 2008, ISBN 978-3-8353-0330-0.
- Nach den Diskotheken. Gedichte (= Reihe Lyrik. Bd. 17). kookbooks, Idstein 2010, ISBN 978-3-937445-41-0.
- Vom Gehen und Stehen. Ein Handbuch (= Reihe Lyrik. Bd. 30). kookbooks, Idstein 2013, ISBN 978-3-937445-55-7.
- Ungeheuer. Stücke/Gedichte (= Reihe Lyrik. Bd. 46). kookbooks, Idstein 2016, ISBN 978-3-937445-77-9.
- Es könnte auch schön werden (= Reihe Lyrik. Bd. 57). kookbooks, Idstein 2018, ISBN 978-3-937445-90-8.
- In die Wälder gehen, Holz für ein Bett klauen. kookbooks, Berlin 2020, ISBN 978-3-948336-10-3.
- Hey guten Morgen, wie geht es dir? Klett-Cotta, Stuttgart 2024, ISBN 978-3-608-98826-0.

== Literature (a selection) ==
- Katharina Gerstenberger (2008), "Small Stories: The Novels of Martina Hefter", in Katharina Gerstenberger, Patricia Herminghouse (ed.), German Literature in a New Century. Trends, Traditions, Transitions, Transformations, New York, Oxford: Berghahn Books, pp. 253–267, doi:10.1515/9781845458669-020, ISBN 978-1-84545-866-9
- Josef Zierden: Martina Hefter. In: Kritisches Lexikon zur deutschsprachigen Gegenwartsliteratur, Stand: 1 January 2022.
