= Peter Wawerzinek =

German artist and writer

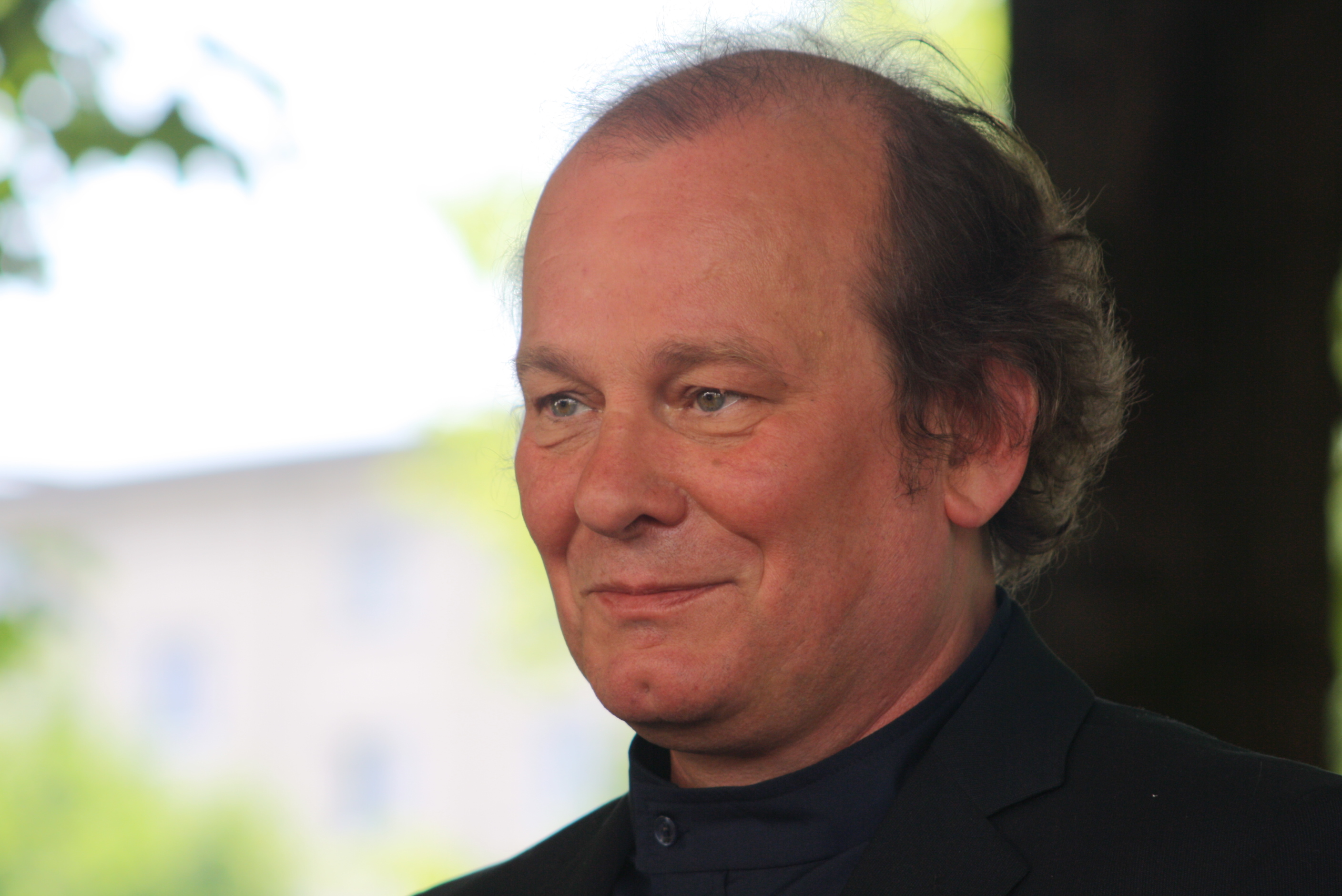
- Born: Peter Runkel; 28 September 1954 (age 71); Rostock, Bezirk Rostock, East Germany
- Occupations: artist and writer

Peter Wawerzinek (born 28 September 1954 as Peter Runkel) is a German artist and writer.

Peter Wawerzinek was born in 1954 in Rostock, in East Germany. His parents escaped from East Germany shortly after his birth leaving him behind. He grew up in the north of East Germany near the coast of the Baltic Sea and was adopted after some years in children's homes.

He moved to East Berlin in 1978 where he studied art (without completing a degree), worked a various jobs including gravedigger and carpenter. In the 1980s he was a performance artist and poet. As of 2010 he lives in Berlin. He won the Ingeborg Bachmann Prize in 2010 for his excerpt Ich finde dich (I'll Find You) of his novel Rabenliebe (Bad Love, literally: Ravens' Love) which was also on the short-list of the 2010 German Book Prize. Wawerzinek has received numerous grants, among them the author's grant from the German Academy Rome Villa Massimo 2019.

== Works ==
- Es war einmal ... – Parodien zur DDR-Literatur, Berlin 1990
- Nix, Berlin 1990
- Die 6. Tonnenleerung, Berlin 1990
- Moppel Schappiks Tätowierungen, Berlin 1991
- Das Kind, das ich war, Berlin 1994
- Mein Babylon, Berlin 1995
- Fallada ich zucke, Berlin 1996 (with Klaus Zylla)
- Vielleicht kommt Peter noch vorbei, Leipzig 1997
- Café Komplott, Berlin 1998
- Oliv ist Arsen oder Pekinger Wüsteneien, Berlin 1998 (with Klaus Bendler)
- Skorbut, Augsburg 1998
- Der Galionsfigurenschnitzer, Berlin 2000 (with Tim von Veh)
- Das Meer an sich ist weniger, Berlin 2000
- Der Krieg ist doch verloren?, Rheinbach 2001 (with Bodo Korsig)
- Sperrzone reines Deutschland. Szenen einer Sommerreise, Berlin 2001
- Mein Salzkammergut. Von Seereisen und Seefahrten, Wien, St. Wolfgang 2008
- Rabenliebe, Berlin 2010, ISBN 978-3-86971-020-4
- Schluckspecht, Galiani, Berlin 2014, ISBN 978-3-86971-084-6
- Liebestölpel, Galiani, Berlin, Köln 2019, ISBN 978-3-86971-152-2
