= Lydia Mischkulnig =

Austrian writer (born 1963)

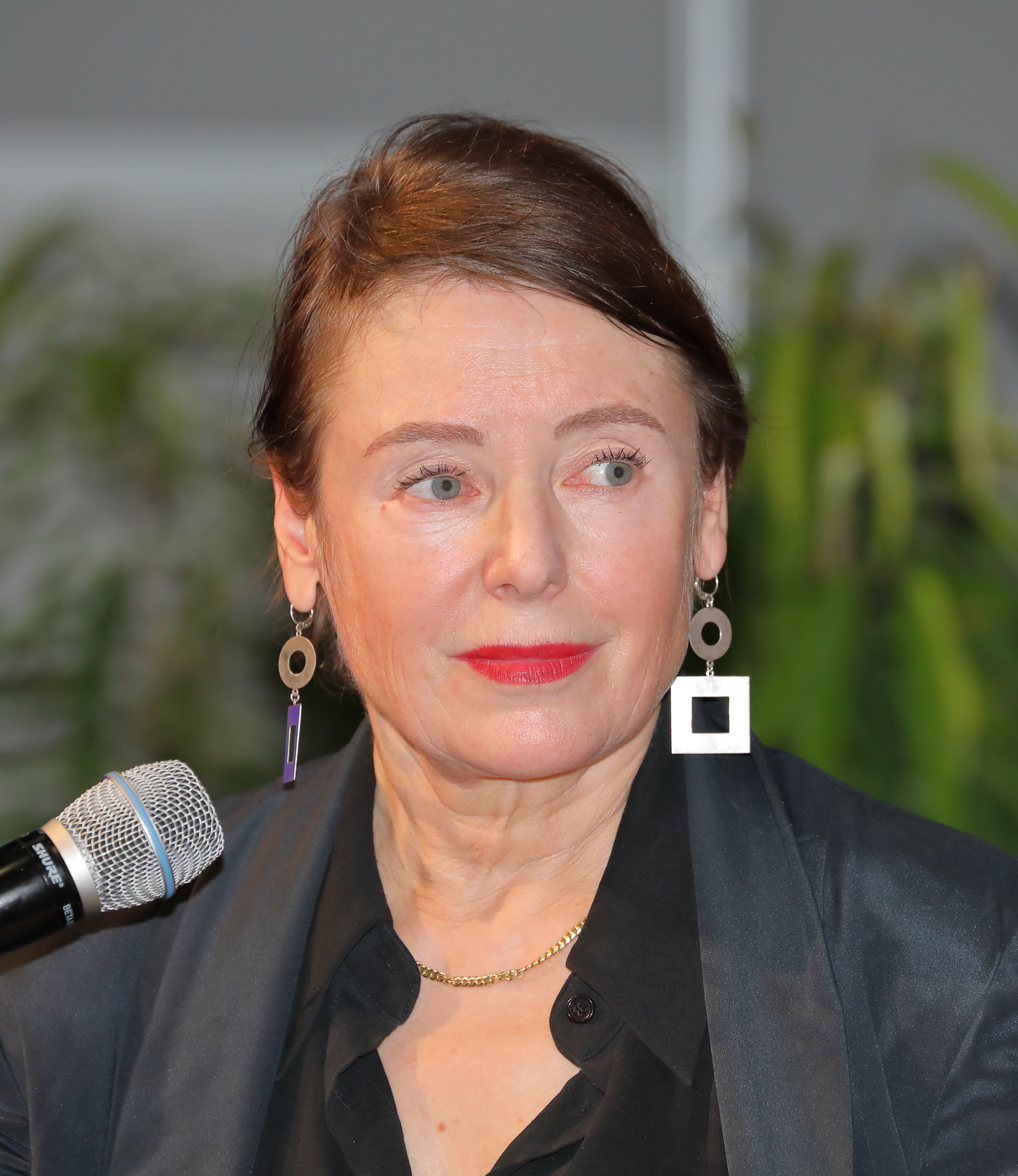
Lydia Mischkulnig

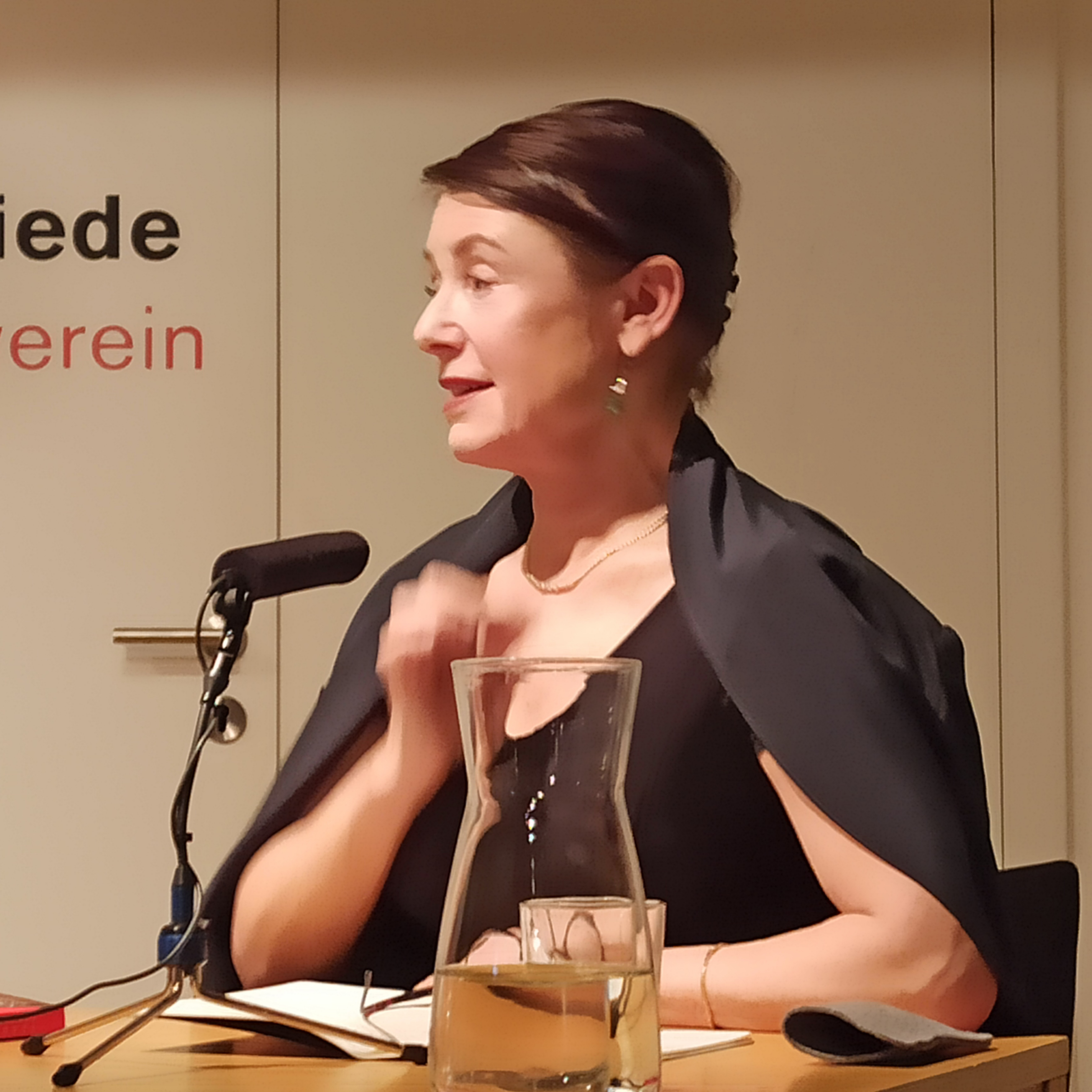
Lydia Mischkulnig at a reading

Lydia Mischkulnig (born 2 August 1963 in Klagenfurt) is an Austrian writer living in Vienna. She was the winner of the Bertelsmann-Literaturpreis.

== Live ==
Mischkulnig studied from 1981 onwards scenic design and film at the university of Music and Performing Arts Graz and from 1985 to 1990 scriptwriting and production at the Vienna Film Academy, University of Music and Performing Arts Vienna.

From 1991 on, Mischkulnig works as a writer. In 1994 she published her debut novel „Halbes Leben". 1996 she participated at the Festival of German-Language Literature and won the Bertelsmann-Literaturpreis. She wrote novels, narratives und radio dramas.

Mischkulnig writes since 2015 columns (Federspiel, Die Furche) and essays on culture. She is editor of the Nadelstiche series, published by Theodor Kramer Verlag. She leads conceptualises discussion series in the literary quarter Alte Schmiede in Vienna. Examples are Werk/Leben, Textlupe.

With author Sabine Scholl she wrote the five volume work Böhmische Bibel. In 2014 the composer Renald Deppe set a libretto by her to music.

Mischkulnig held guest professorshipts and teaching positions at various universities. 2008, 2011/12, and 2014/15 in Japan, from 2009 to 2016 at the University of Applied Arts in Vienna. She teaches literary writing, for example at the Leondinger Literaturakademie.

== Reception ==
The reception points out her cool, surrealistic language, which is socio politically relevant, and characterized by tension and precision.

„Lydia Mischkulnig widmet sich den Auswirkungen des Kapitalismus, unsichtbaren, umso wirksameren Abhängigkeiten, verhängnisvollen Verflechtungen mit der Ökonomie. …‚Was die Massen bewegt, davor graut mir.‘ Mit Dienstleistungsprosa hat Mischkulnig nichts am Hut. Kunst schmeißt Regeln um, setzt etwas in die Welt, das über sich selbst hinausweist…. Einmal leiser dann wieder mit deutlicher Ironie, dreht und wendet sie die Worte." (Brigitte Schwens-Harrant, from her laudatio for the Veza-Canetti-Preis 2017)

Karin Fleischanderl summarises in her laudatio for the Johann-Beer-Literaturpreis: „ ‚So wie Mischkulnig schreibt sonst keine‘, hat der Kritiker Anton Thuswaldner festgestellt. Für ihren eigenen, eigenartigen Stil, dem es gelingt, die Wirklichkeit aufzubrechen und das Ambigue und Uneindeutige hervorzuholen, erhält sie heute den Johann-Beer-Preis.“

„Immer wieder sind es nicht nur zwischenmenschliche Beziehungen, sondern auch jene zwischen der großen, weiten (Waren-)Welt und dem Intimisten, die Mischkulnig mit ihrer Sprachkunst mikroskopiert, hier essayistisch und näher an der Wirklichkeit, dort versponnenner, assoziativer. Darauf, dass die Illusion am Ende platzt, mag es indes weniger ankommen als eben auf die Art und Weise, wie meisterhaft Mischkulnig in diesem sehr zeitgemäßen Setting die Temperaturen schwanken lässt.", so Roman Gerold in Standard.

== Works ==
- Halbes Leben. Novel, Droschl Verlag, Graz 1994, ISBN 3-85420-381-0.
- Hollywood im Winter. Novel, Haymon Verlag, Innsbruck 1996, ISBN 3-85218-219-0.
- Sieben Versuchungen. Narratives, Deutsche Verlagsanstalt, Stuttgart 1998, ISBN 3-421-05117-8.
- Umarmung. Novel, Deutsche Verlagsanstalt, Stuttgart 2002, ISBN 3-421-05182-8.
- mit Sabine Scholl: Böhmische Bibel – Unheilige Schrift für Puppen. in four volumes, Vol. 1 FIONA, vol 2 LIBUSE, vol 3 HERMINATOR, vol 4 SALAM. Wieser Verlag, Celovec/Klagenfurt 2008/2009.
- Macht euch keine Sorgen. Neun Heimsuchungen, Haymon Verlag, Innsbruck 2009, ISBN 978-3-85218-583-5.
- Schwestern der Angst. Roman, Haymon Verlag, Innsbruck 2010, ISBN 3-85218-642-0.
- Esperanza, Schiff der Alpen! in „SchmutzkübelK...“, edited by FreiraumK, Drava Verlag-Založba Drava Klagenfurt/Celovec 2013, ISBN 978-3-85435-710-0.
- Vom Gebrauch der Wünsche. Novel, Haymon Verlag, Innsbruck 2014, ISBN 978-3-7099-7028-7.
- Die Paradiesmaschine. Narratives, Haymon Verlag, Innsbruck 2016, ISBN 978-3-7099-7258-8.
- Die sieben Leben der Marie Schwarz, mit Vea Kaiser, Eva Rossmann, Gertraud Klemm, Angelika Reitzer, Cornelia Travnicek und Doris Knecht, Molden/Styria, Wien 2020, ISBN 978-3-222-15043-2.
- Die Richterin. Novel, Haymon Verlag, Innsbruck 2020, ISBN 978-3-7099-8110-8.
- Die Gemochten. Narratives, Leykam, Graz 2022, ISBN 978-3-7011-8252-7.

== Awards and honours ==
- 1993 Literaturförderpreis der Zeitschrift manuskripte
- 1996 Bertelsmann-Literaturpreis at Ingeborg-Bachmann-Wettbewerb
- 1996 Großes Österreichische Staatsstipendium für Literatur
- 1997 Literaturförderpreis des Landes Kärnten
- 2002 Manuskripte-Preis
- 2007 Elias-Canetti-Stipendium der Stadt Wien
- 2009 Österreichischer Förderungspreis für Literatur
- 2017 Veza-Canetti-Preis der Stadt Wien
- 2017 Johann-Beer-Literaturpreis
- 2020 Würdigungspreis des Landes Kärnten für Literatur
