= Nava Ebrahimi =

German-Iranian writer

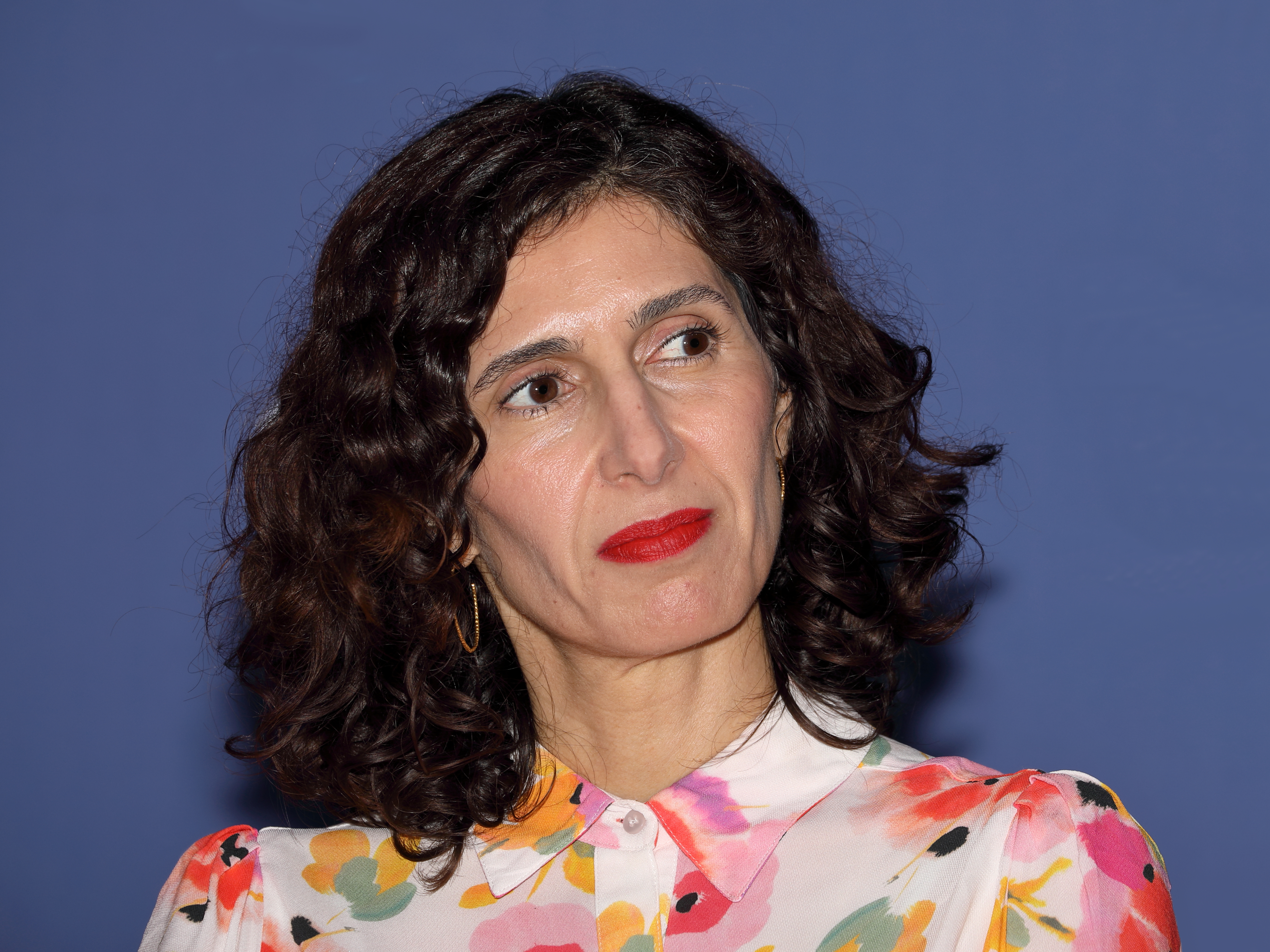
- Nava Ebrahimi (2025)
- Born: 1978 (age 47–48); Tehran
- Occupation: Writer
- Writing career
- Language: German

Nava Ebrahimi (born 1978) is a German-Iranian writer.

== Biography ==
Nava Ebrahimi was born in Tehran in 1978. She was three when her family arrived in Cologne, where she later studied journalism and economics. She went on to work as a journalist and editor for the Financial Times Deutschland and the Cologne StadtRevue. She also worked as an advisor for the Federal Agency for Foreign Trade as well as a copywriter. She has lived in Graz with her husband Matthias and their children since 2012. Ebrahimi attended the Bavarian Academy of Writing in 2013. Her first novel came out and won the 2017 Austrian Book award for a debut novel. Ebrahimi has been nominated and won a number of awards including the Austrian book award. She was given a grant for literature in 2017 and won the Red maple literature prize in 2020. In 2021, Ebrahimi was awarded the Ingeborg Bachmann Prize for Der Cousin. In 2025 her latest novel Und Federn überall was on the longlist of the German Book Prize.

== Selected works ==
- Ebrahimi, Nava (2017). Sechzehn Wörter Roman (in German). München: btb Verlag. ISBN 978-3-442-75679-7. OCLC 964671187.
- Ebrahimi, Nava (2020). Das Paradies meines Nachbarn Roman (in German). München: btb Verlag. ISBN 978-3-442-75869-2. OCLC 1126578676.
- Lederer, Anton; Makovec, Margarethe; Rotor (2020). Guerrilla der Aufklärung = Guerrilla of Enlightenment (in German). Vienna. ISBN 978-3-903320-94-9. OCLC 1205588847.
- Ebrahimi, Nava (2025). Und Federn überall, Roman (in German). München: Luchterhand. ISBN 978-3-630-87745-7. OCLC 1514203512.
