= Katharina Hacker =

German author

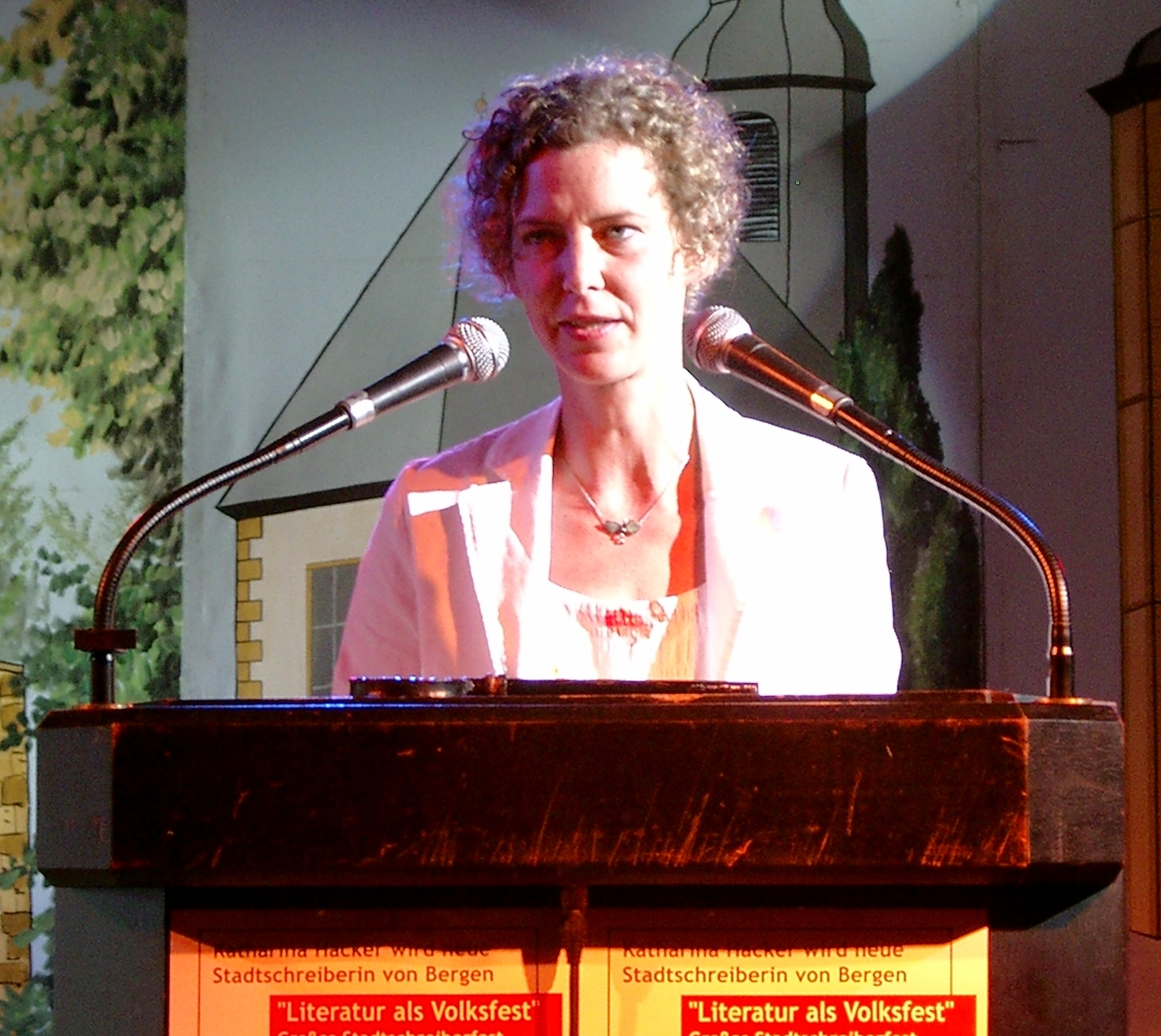
- Hacker in 2005
- Born: 11 January 1967 (age 59); Frankfurt am Main, West Germany
- Occupation: Novelist
- Writing career
- Language: German
- Notable work: Die Habenichtse
- Notable awards: German Book Prize; 2006
- Website: www.katharinahacker.de

Katharina Hacker (born 11 January 1967) is a German author best known for her award-winning novel Die Habenichtse (The Have-Nots). Hacker studied philosophy, history and Jewish studies at the University of Freiburg and the University of Jerusalem. Her studies in Israel have been seen as an attempt to compensate for the strong antisemitic feelings of her Silesian grandmother. She did not finish her studies with an academic degree. Since 1996, she has been living as a freelance writer in Berlin. In 2006, she was the second writer to be awarded the German Book Prize for Die Habenichtse. In this and other works, Hacker examines the consequences of globalization and neoliberalism on the working life, social relations, and family interactions of her German protagonists.

== Works ==
- Hacker, Katharina (2013). Tel Aviv eine Stadterzählung (in German). Frankfurt, M. ISBN 978-3-596-18967-0. OCLC 855868938.
- —— (2013). Morpheus oder Der Schnabelschuh Erzählungen (in German). Frankfurt, M. ISBN 978-3-596-18968-7. OCLC 855868940.
  - —— (2003). Morpheus. [New Milford, CT]: Toby Press. ISBN 1-902881-66-4. OCLC 52517369.
- —— (2012). Der Bademeister Roman (in German). Frankfurt, M. ISBN 978-3-596-18969-4. OCLC 879119610.
  - ——; Atkins, Helen (2002). The lifeguard. [London]: Toby Press. ISBN 1-902881-45-1. OCLC 49207830.
- —— (2012). Eine Art Liebe Roman (in German). Frankfurt am Main. ISBN 978-3-10-400936-0. OCLC 858035958.
- —— (2012). Die Habenichtse Roman (in German). Frankfurt am Main. ISBN 978-3-10-400939-1. OCLC 858031404.
  - ——; Atkins, Helen (2008). The have-nots. New York. ISBN 978-1-933372-41-9. OCLC 154704734.
- —— (2007). Überlandleitung : Prosagedichte (in German). Frankfurt am Main: Suhrkamp. ISBN 978-3-518-41909-0. OCLC 173071336.
- —— (2009). Alix, Anton und die anderen : Roman (in German). Frankfurt am Main: Suhrkamp. ISBN 978-3-518-42127-7. OCLC 469634713.
- —— (2010). Die Erdbeeren von Antons Mutter (in German). Frankfurt, M. ISBN 978-3-10-030064-5. OCLC 631717948.
- —— (2011). Eine Dorfgeschichte (in German). Frankfurt am Main: S. Fischer. ISBN 978-3-10-030066-9. OCLC 760917435.
- —— (2015). Skip Roman. Frankfurt, M: S. Fischer Verlag GmbH. ISBN 978-3-10-030065-2. OCLC 908642716.

== Translations ==
- Eni, Le'ah (1997). Eine muss da sein : Roman (in German). Frankfurt am Main: Suhrkamp. ISBN 3-518-40924-7. OCLC 40122409.
- Avni-Leṿi, Yosi (2002). Der Garten der toten Bäume Roman in fünfzehn Episoden (in German). Frankfurt am Main. ISBN 978-3-518-39879-1. OCLC 76705446.
