= Inka Parei =

German writer (born 1967)

Inka Parei (born 1967 in Frankfurt) is a German writer who lives in Berlin. She studied sociology, political science, sinology and German studies. Parei won the 2003 Ingeborg Bachmann Prize for excerpts from her book Was Dunkelheit war.

== Works ==
- Was Dunkelheit war, Roman, Schöffling, Frankfurt/Main 2005, 169 S. ISBN 3-89561-106-9
- Die Besten 2003 : Klagenfurter Texte / die 27. Tage der Deutschsprachigen Literatur in Klagenfurt (compiler-editor Iris Radisch)
- Die Schattenboxerin, Roman, 1999; TB Frankfurt/Main 2001, ISBN 3-596-14869-3

== Translations ==
- Chinese Da Taijiquan de Nühai（打太極拳的女孩）, 2002
- French La boxeuse d'ombres, 2001
- Italian La ragazza che fa a pugni con l'ombra, 2004
- Polish Krotiteljica sjenki, 2004
- Swedish Skuggboxerskan, 2001
- Serbian Krotiteljka senki, 2004
- Spanish La luchadora de sombras, 2002
- Bulgarian Улична боксьорка, 2007
