= Hey guten Morgen, wie geht es dir? =

German novel published in 2024

- Author: Martina Hefter
- Language: German
- Publisher: Klett-Cotta
- Publication date: 13 July 2024
- Pages: 224
- ISBN: 978-3-608-98826-0

Hey guten Morgen, wie geht es dir? (transl. Hey good morning, how are you?) is a 2024 German novel by Martina Hefter. The novel combines everyday reality with mythological allusions and digital encounters. The novel was awarded the 2024 German Book Prize.

== Plot ==
Juno Isabella Flock is in her mid-fifties, lives in Leipzig and works as a dancer and choreographer. She lives with her husband Jupiter, a writer who suffers from a severe form of multiple sclerosis and requires increasing amounts of care. While Juno looks after her sick husband during the day, she leads a double life on the internet at night. She chats with so-called love scammers – internet fraudsters who use fake profiles to contact people looking for love in order to exploit them for money. One of these scammers is Benu from Nigeria, with whom she develops an intense virtual relationship. Despite the knowledge of the artificiality of the situation, a special connection develops between them.

== Publication ==
The novel, originally titled Hey guten Morgen, wie geht es dir?, was first published on 12 July 2024, by publishing house Klett-Cotta Verlag. An English translation by Linda Gaus was published on 30 April 2026, published by Penguin Books.

== Reception ==
The novel received mixed reception. Deutschlandfunk and Bayerischer Rundfunk praised the work's combination of everyday reality with mythological and cosmic dimensions and its unique appeal. The jury of the German Book Prize praised the book as "smartly choreographed". Deutschlandfunk Kultur criticized the lack of depth in character development and the monotony of the dialogue and said that Benu's perspective is not sufficiently explored.

Reviewing the English translation, Dina Nayeri, writing for The Guardian, called the novel "overwritten and underfelt", criticising the novel's surface-level exploration of its own themes.

== Awards ==
Hefter received the German Book Prize for Hey guten Morgen, wie geht es dir? in 2024.
