= Tanya Malyarchuk =

Ukrainian-born author (born 1983)

- Таня Малярчук
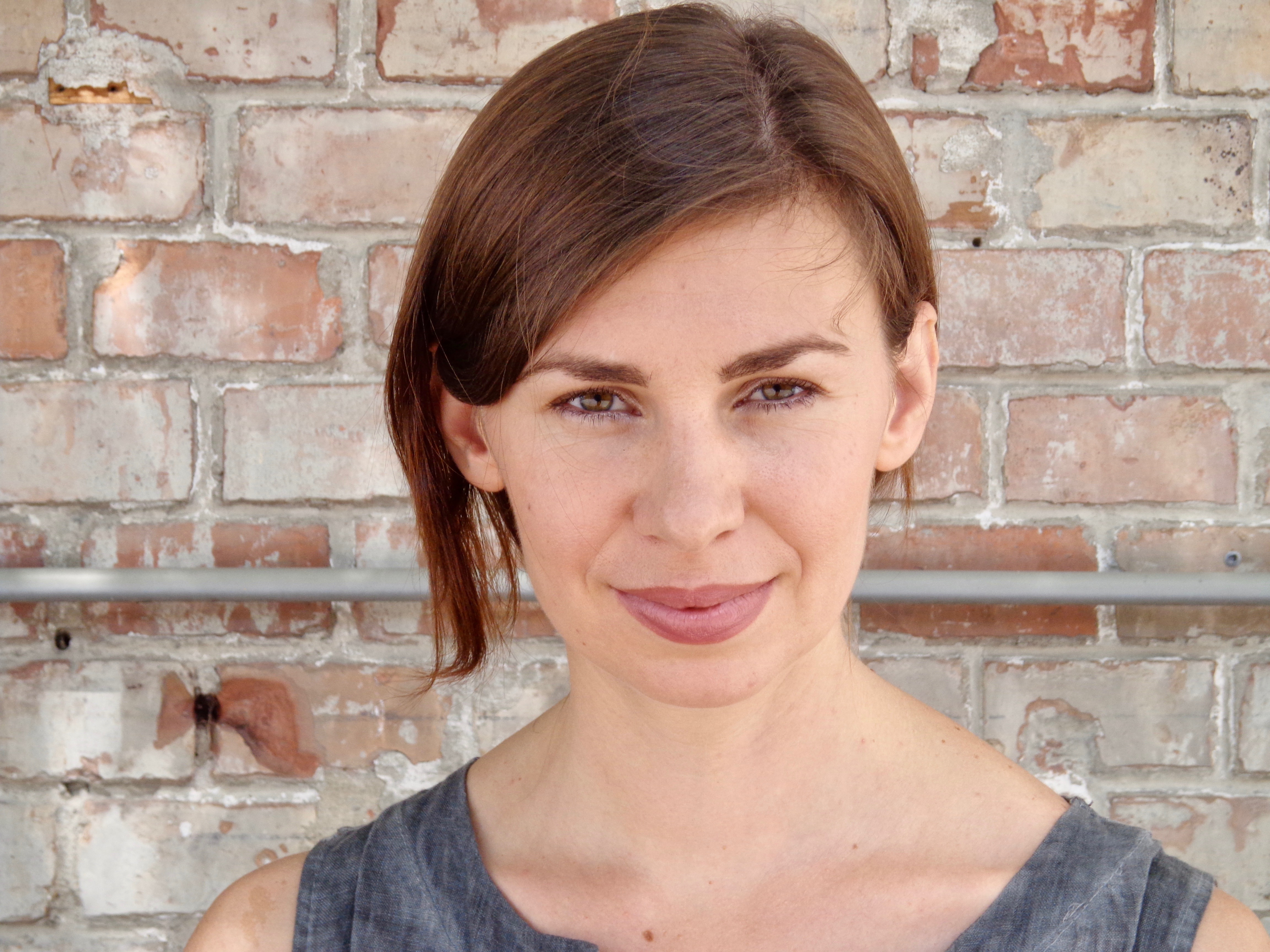
- Born: 1983 (age 42–43); Ivano-Frankivsk, Ukrainian SSR, Soviet Union (now Ukraine)

Tetiana "Tania" Volodymyrivna Maliarchuk (Ukrainian: Ukrainian: Тетяна "Таня" Володимирівна Малярчук, German: Tetjana "Tanja" Wolodymyriwna Maljartschuk, born 1983 in Ivano-Frankivsk) is a Ukrainian-born author who writes in both Ukrainian and, more recently, German.

== Career ==
Tania Maliarchuk began with several volumes of short stories and novellas: Adolfo's Endspiel, or A Rose for Liza (2004), From Top to Bottom: A Book of Fears (2006), How I Became a Saint (2006), To Speak (2007), and Zviroslov (2009). Her first novel, Biography of an Accidental Miracle, was published in 2012.

Maliarchuk has been writing in German since 2014. In 2018 she won the Ingeborg Bachmann Award for Frösche im Meer (Frogs in the Sea), an unpublished text she read at the Festival of German-Language Literature.

Her Ukrainian work has been translated into German since 2009 (Neunprozentiger Haushaltsessing, Biografie eines zufälligen Wunders, both by Residenz Verlag). Some has also been translated into English. The short story "Me and My Sacred Cow" was published in Best European Fiction 2013, edited by Aleksandar Hemon. Her novel Forgottenness appeared in English translation in 2024.

Tania Maliarchuk lives in Vienna.

== Awards ==
- 2013 — "Kristal Vilenica-2013" (Slovenia)
- 2013 – Joseph Conrad-Korzeniowski Literary Award
- 2016 – BBC Ukrainian's Book of the Year 2016 Award
- 2018 — Ingeborg Bachmann Award

== See also ==
- List of Ukrainian-language writers
- List of Ukrainian women writers
- List of Ukrainian literature translated into English
