= Inger-Maria Mahlke =

German author (born 1977)

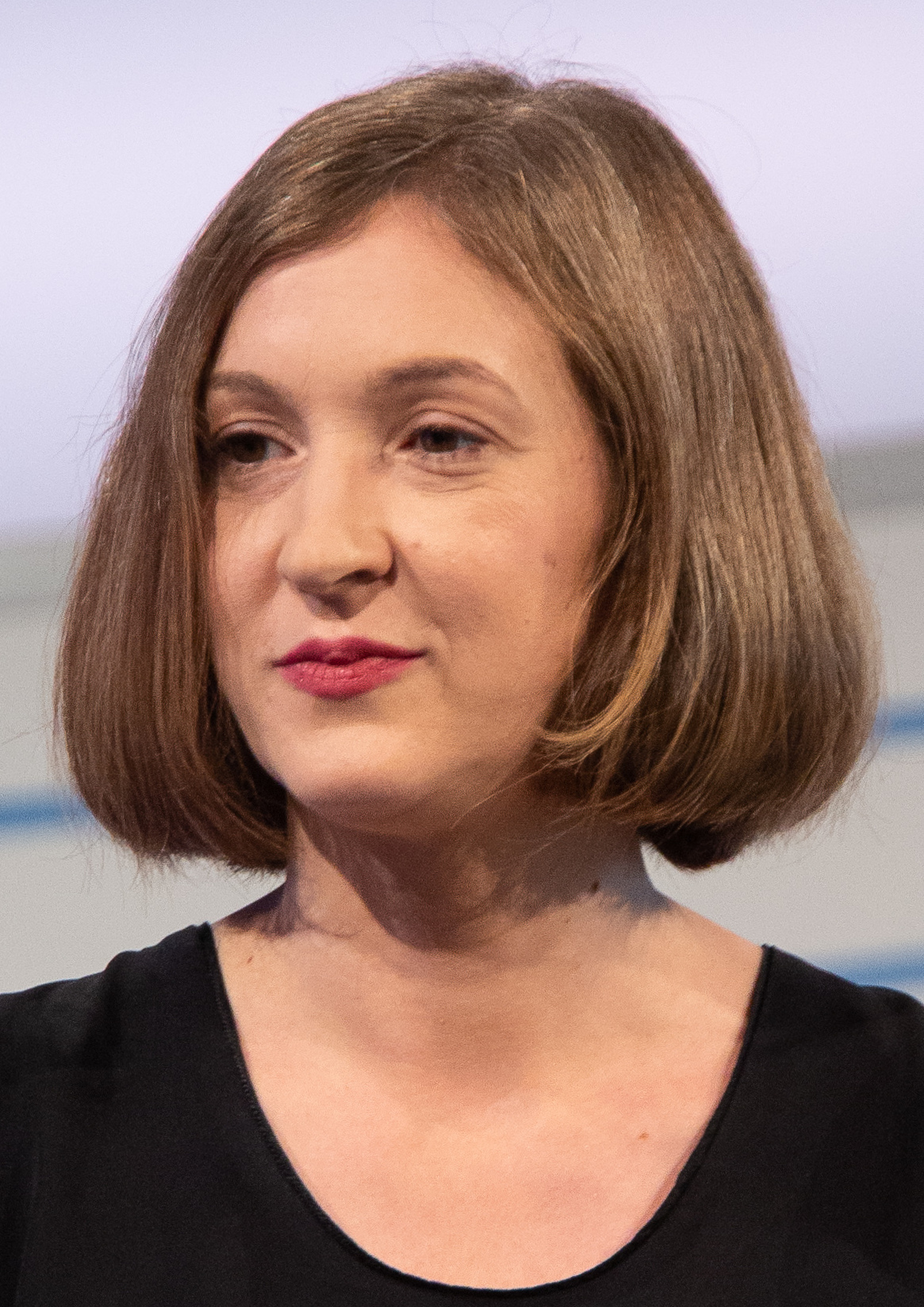
- Mahlke during an ARD interview at the Frankfurt Book Fair, 2018
- Born: 1977 (age 48–49); Hamburg, West Germany
- Education: Katharineum
- Alma mater: Free University of Berlin
- Occupation: Author
- Writing career
- Language: German
- Notable work: Archipel
- Notable awards: German Book Prize
- Website: Inger-Maria Mahlke on Instagram

Inger-Maria Mahlke (born 1977 in Hamburg, West Germany) is a German author. In 2018 she was the recipient of the German Book Prize.

== Life ==
Mahlke grew up in Lübeck, Schleswig-Holstein, northern Germany. She studied Law at the Free University of Berlin, where she worked in the department of Criminology. She lives in Berlin.

== Writing career ==
In 2009 she won the Open Mike award, an international German-language literary prize established in 1993 for new writers. Her first novel was Silberfischchen (Silverfish) published in 2010, for which she was awarded the inaugural Klaus-Michael Kühne Prize of the Hamburg Harbour Front Literaturfestival, an award for debut novelists established in the same year.

In 2012 she was awarded the Ernst Willner Prize of the Festival of German-Language Literature. Other awards followed including a shortlisting for the 2015 German Book Prize for her novel Wie Ihr wollt. In 2018 she was awarded the German Book Prize for her novel, Archipel.

Mahlke is a member of the PEN Centre Germany.

== Works ==
- Mahlke, Inger-Maria (2010). Silberfischchen (1. Aufl ed.). Berlin: Aufbau. ISBN 978-3-351-03309-5. OCLC 660149626.
- Mahlke, Inger-Maria (2013). Rechnung offen. Berlin. ISBN 978-3-8270-1130-5. OCLC 827925112.
- Mahlke, Inger-Maria (2015). Wie Ihr wollt. Berlin: Berlin Verlag. ISBN 978-3-8270-1213-5. OCLC 898077026.
- Jügler, Matthias (2016). Wie wir leben wollen Texte für Solidarität und Freiheit (in German). Berlin: Suhrkamp Verlag. ISBN 978-3-518-46710-7. OCLC 936193732.
- Mahlke, Inger-Maria (2018). Archipel (in German). Reinbek bei Hamburg: Rowohlt Verlag. ISBN 978-3-498-04224-0. OCLC 1033660660.
- Mahlke, Inger-Maria (2023). Unsereins (in German). Hamburg: Rowohlt Verlag. ISBN 978-3-498-00181-0.

== Literature ==
- Takis Würger: Überzeugungstäterin. Besuch bei der Schriftstellerin Inger-Maria Mahlke. In: Der Spiegel. No. 39/2018, pp. 126f.
