= Johanna Sebauer =

Austrian writer (born 1988)

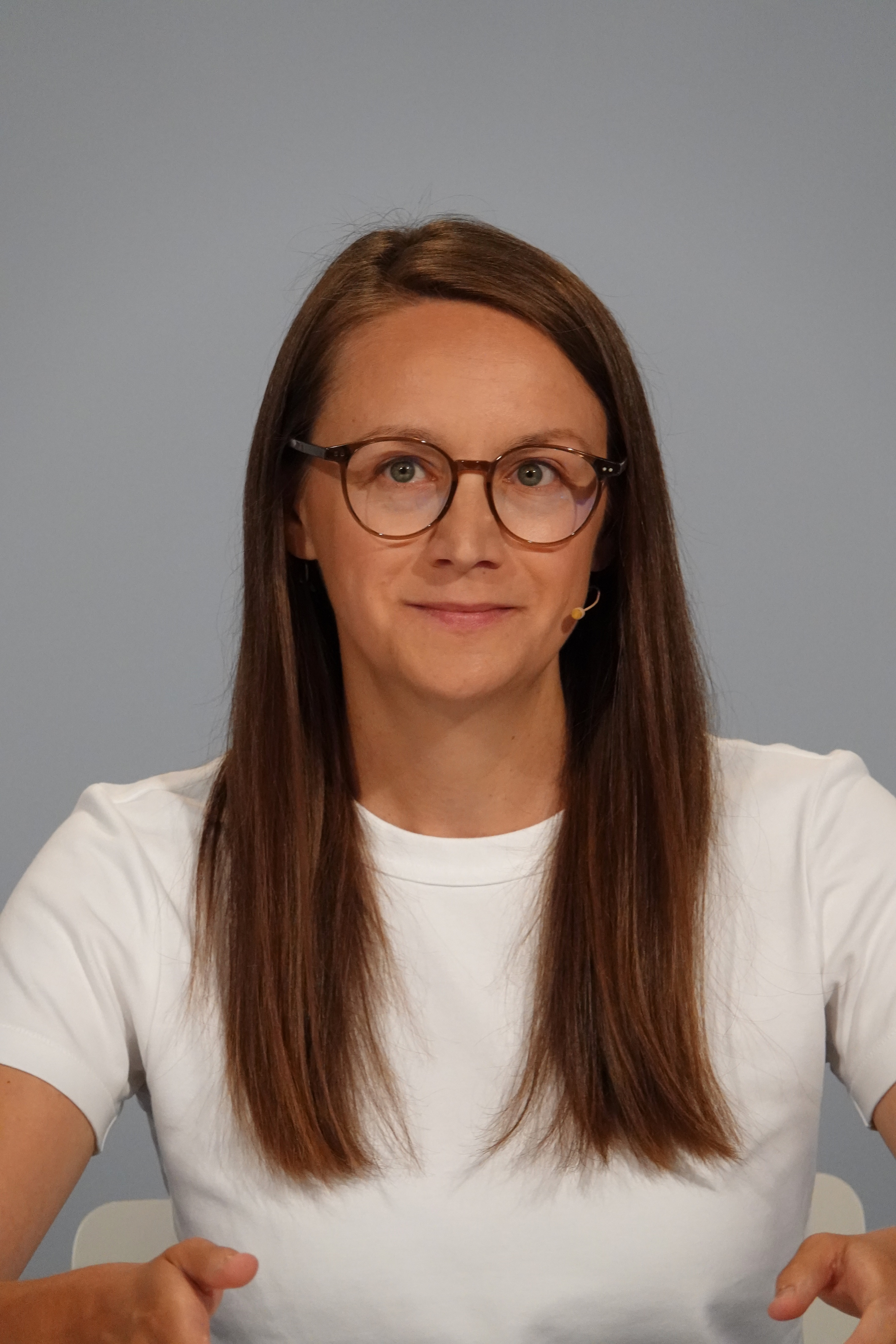
- Sebauer in 2024
- Born: 1988 (age 37–38); Vienna, Austria
- Occupation: Writer
- Writing career
- Language: German

Johanna Sebauer (born 1988) is an Austrian writer.

== Biography ==
Johanna Sebauer was born in Vienna in 1988, the daughter of publisher Vera Sebauer (1954–2015) and journalist Wolfgang Weisgram. She grew up in Burgenland, studied political science at the University of Vienna and then journalism in Aarhus in Denmark, in Santiago, Chile and in Hamburg, where she moved in 2013.

In 2014, Sebauer was awarded the Burgenland Youth Literature Prize for her short story Edina on the subject of 25 years since the fall of the Iron Curtain. In 2023 she published the novel Nincshof with DuMont Buchverlag about the eponymous fictional village in Burgenland near the Hungarian border. The name of the place is derived from the Hungarian term nincs, meaning nothing or none. For her debut novel, she was awarded the debut prize of the Harbour Front Literature Festival 2023, endowed with 10,000 euros. In 2019, she was awarded the Burgenland Literature Prize for a first version of the novel.

Sebauer works in science communication, is a member of the Hamburg writers' room and part of the Zinnober reading stage in the Zinnschmelze Barmbek.

At the invitation of Klaus Kastberger, she read her text Das Gurkerl at the competition for the Ingeborg Bachmann Prize 2024, for which she was awarded the 3sat Prize, the BKS Bank Audience Prize and the City of Klagenfurt Writer's Scholarship.

== Bibliography ==
- Edina, Kurzgeschichte zum Thema 25 Jahre Fall des Eisernen Vorhangs, 2014.
- August und Wie Erna Rohdiebl aus Pamhagen ihr Herz an die Nordsee verlor, Kurzgeschichten. In: Christoph Andexlinger: Junge Literatur Burgenland: Band 1, edition lex liszt 12, Oberwart 2018, ISBN 978-3-99016-139-5.
- Ein Versuch übers Sowohl-als-auch, in Vom Kommen und Gehen: Burgenland: Betrachtungen von Zu- und Weggereisten, published by Peter Menasse and Wolfgang Wagner, Böhlau-Verlag, Vienna/Cologne 2021, ISBN 978-3-205-21275-1.
- Nincshof, Roman, DuMont-Buchverlag, Cologne 2023, ISBN 978-3-8321-6820-9.
