= Anna Kim =

Austrian writer (born 1977)

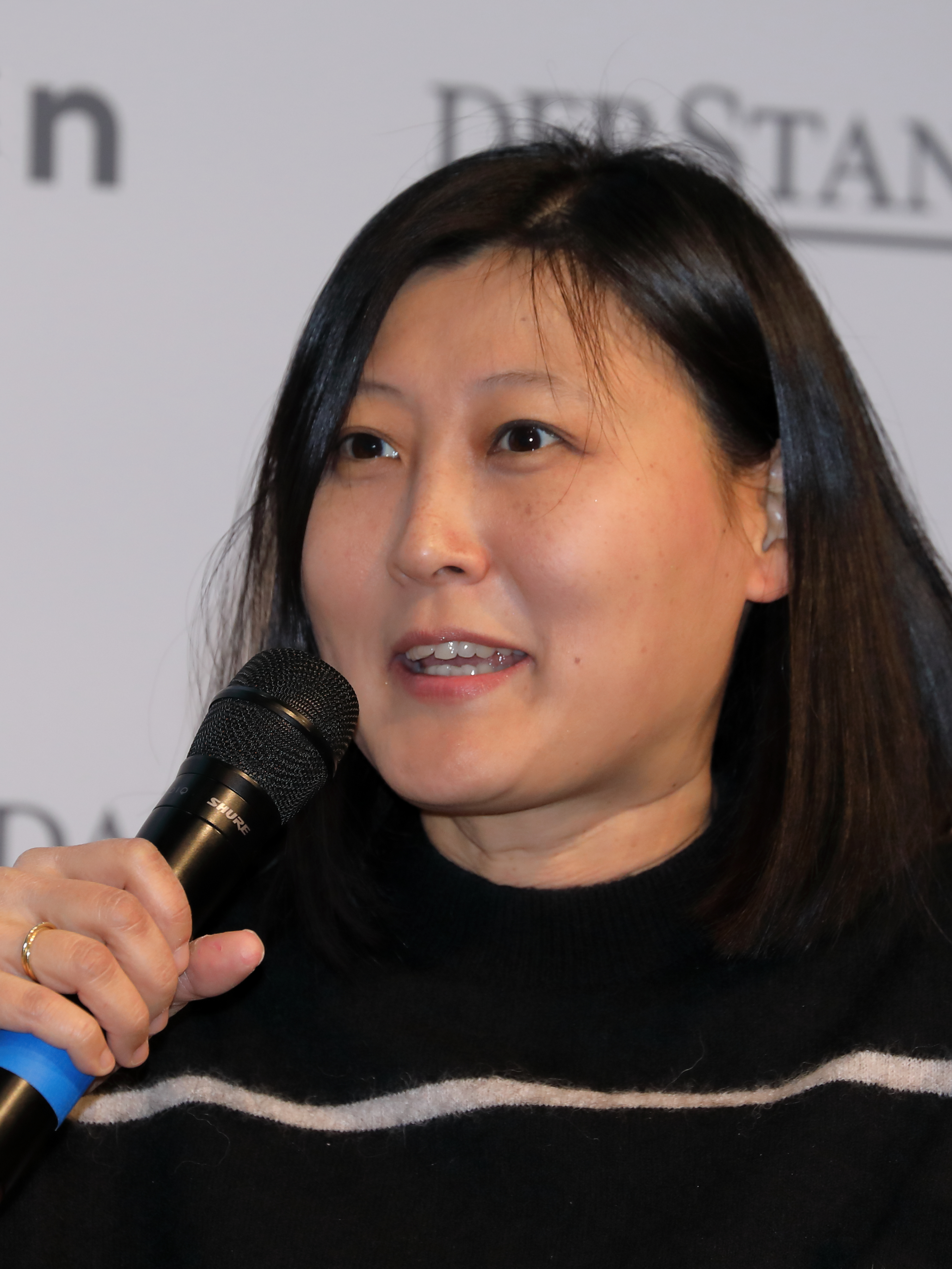
- Born: 10 September 1977 (age 48); Daejeon, South Korea
- Education: University of Vienna
- Occupation: Writer
- Awards: European Union Prize for Literature (2012)

Anna Kim (born 10 September 1977, in Daejeon) is an Austrian writer.

== Biography ==
Kim was born in Daejeon, South Korea in 1977 but moved to Germany in 1979. She received a master's degree in philosophy and theatre studies from the University of Vienna.

Since 1999, she has regularly published in newspapers, magazines and anthologies.

In 2012, Kim was Austria's winner of the European Union Prize for Literature for her second novel, Die gefrorene Zeit (translated in English as Frozen Time). Published in 2008, the novel covers a Kosovar man searching for his missing wife after the end of the Yugoslav wars.

Kim lives in Vienna.

== Awards ==
Kim has received numerous awards and grants:

- 2009: HALMA Scholarship
- 2009: Elias Canetti Scholarship
- 2009: Heinrich Treichl Prize from the Austrian Red Cross
- 2010: Robert Musil Scholarship
- 2012: European Union Prize for Literature for Die gefrorene Zeit (Frozen Time)
- 2017: Artist in Residence at Villa Sträuli in Winterthur
- 2022: Nominated for the German Book Prize (Longlist) for Geschichte eines Kindes (Story of a Child)
- 2022: Nominated for the Austrian Book Prize (Shortlist) for Geschichte eines Kindes (Story of a Child)
- 2023: Awarded the Veza-Canetti-Preis of the city of Vienna

== Selected works ==
- Die Bilderspur (The Trace of Pictures, 2004) – novel ISBN 3-85420-662-3
- Das Sinken ein Bückflug (2006) – poetry collection
- Die gefrorene Zeit (Frozen Time, 2008) – novel ISBN 978-3-85420-742-9
- Invasionen den Privaten (Invasions of Privacy, 2011) – essay ISBN 978-3-85420-781-8
- Anatomie einer Nacht (Anatomy of a Night, 2012) – novel ISBN 978-3-518-46478-6
- Die große Heimkehr (The Great Homecoming, 2017) - novel ISBN 978-3-518-46888-3
- Geschichte eines Kindes (Story of a Child, 2022) - novel ISBN 978-3-518-47364-1
