= Humbert Fink =

Austrian writer and journalist

Humbert Fink (i.e. Luigi Umberto Fink; born 13 August 1933 in Vietri sul Mare near Salerno, Italy; died 16 May 1992 in Maria Saal, Carinthia) was an Austrian writer and journalist.

After a book of poetry and two novels, Fink wrote numerous travel essays and guides, as well as biographies of well-known persons in history. In 1957–58, he edited the magazine Die österreichischen Blätter, and from 1959 on he edited the magazine Hefte für Literatur und Kritik jointly with Paul Kruntorad. In 1977, with Ernst Willner, the chairman of the Austrian television company in Carinthia, he initiated the Ingeborg Bachmann Prize. Humbert Fink was also a well-known newspaper commentator in Austria.

== Works(extract) ==
- Verse aus Aquafredda, 1953 (poetry)
- Die engen Mauern, 1958 (novel)
- Die Absage, 1960 (novel)
- Adriatische Ufer (travel guide), Verlag Fritz Molden, 1978, ISBN 3-217-00814-6
- Machiavelli, (biography), Munich: List Verlag, 1988, ISBN 3-471-77537-4
- Auf Pilgerstrassen durch Europa Munich: List 1980, ISBN 3-471-77522-6
- Zornige Träume Vienna, Kremayr & Scheriau Verlag 1974
- Am Anfang war die Ägäis, Goldmann, Munich 1982, ISBN 3-442-06903-3
- Denk ich an Österreich … Munich: Molden-Seewald 1983, ISBN 3-88919-019-7
- Franz Grillparzer Innsbruck: Pinguin-Verl.; Frankfurt am Main: Umschau-Verl. 1990, ISBN 3-7016-2336-8
- Das Heilige Land Vienna; Munich; Zurich; New York: Molden 1981, ISBN 3-217-01035-3
- Anatolische Elegie Vienna-Munich: Molden 1977, ISBN 3-217-00772-7
- Iberische Sonne Vienna-Munich-Zurich: Molden 1980, ISBN 3-217-00967-3
- Franz von Assisi Der Mann – Das Werk – Die Zeit. Munich: List 1981, ISBN 3-471-77523-4
- Martin Luther Der widersprüchliche Reformator. Munich: Molden 1982, Ill., ISBN 3-88919-004-9
- Die Botschafter Gottes eine Kulturgeschichte der Heiligen. Munich: List 1983, ISBN 3-471-77533-1
- Fink, Humbert Der Weg nach Jerusalem. Frankfurt/M.; Berlin [West]: Ullstein 1987, ISBN 3-548-34398-8
- Metternich Staatsmann, Spieler, Kavalier. Munich: List 1989, ISBN 3-471-77544-7
- Auf den Spuren des Doppeladlers Ein altösterreichischer Bilderbogen. Düsseldorf; Vienna; New York; Moscow: ECON-Verl. 1996, ISBN 3-612-26134-7
- Joseph II Kaiser, König und Reformer. Düsseldorf; Vienna; New York; Moscow: ECON-Verl. 1990, ISBN 3-430-12749-1
- Land der Deutschen. Reportagen aus einem sonderbaren Land. Innsbruck, Pinguin, 1985
- "Zu Mantua in Banden"; Das Leben und Sterben des Volkshelden Andreas Hofer; Econ Verlag 1992; ISBN 3-430-12779-3
- Metternich Staatsmann, Spieler, Kavalier. Eine Biographie, Knaur; 1993 ISBN 3-426-02420-9

== Literature ==
- Enciclopedia of Austria: Österreich-Lexikon
