= In Times of Fading Light (novel) =

2011 novel by Eugen Ruge

- Author: Eugen Ruge
- Original title: In Zeiten des abnehmenden Lichts
- Translator: Anthea Bell
- Language: German
- Publisher: Rowohlt Verlag
- Publication date: 2011
- Publication place: Germany
- English publication date: 19 June 2014
- Pages: 425
- ISBN: 9783498057862

In Times of Fading Light (German: In Zeiten des abnehmenden Lichts. Roman einer Familie) is a 2011 novel by the German writer Eugen Ruge. The main plot is set shortly before the fall of the Berlin Wall, but the story moves back and forth over a timeline of 50 years, as it follows four generations of an East German family with several members heavily involved in the communist ruling party.

The novel has strong autobiographical elements. Ruge had been active as a playwright, screenwriter and translator since 1986, and In Times of Fading Light was his debut novel, published when he was 57 years old.

The book received the German Book Prize. It was the basis for the 2017 film In Times of Fading Light, directed by Matti Geschonneck and starring Bruno Ganz.
