= Boxhagener Platz (film) =

2010 film

- Film poster
- Directed by: Matti Geschonneck
- Starring: Gudrun Ritter; Michael Gwisdek
- Release dates: 16 February 2010 (BIFF); 4 March 2010 (Germany)
- Running time: 103 minutes
- Country: Germany
- Language: German

Boxhagener Platz is a 2010 German comedy film directed by Matti Geschonneck. The film premiered at the 2010 Berlin International Film Festival. In late 2010, it was put on a shortlist, with eight other films, for the Academy Award for Best Foreign Language Film.

== Cast ==
- Gudrun Ritter as Otti
- Michael Gwisdek as Karl Wegner
- Samuel Schneider as Holger
- Meret Becker as Renate
- Jürgen Vogel as Klaus-Dieter
- Hermann Beyer as Rudi
- Klaus Manchen as Harry Kupferschmidt
- Dieter Montag as Paule Lehmann
- Volkmar Kleinert as Dr. Klemm
- Ingeborg Westphal as Rita
- Hans-Uwe Bauer as Jochen Gundorff
- Horst Krause as Erich Winkler "Fisch-Winkler"
