= In Times of Fading Light (film) =

2017 film

- Poster
- Directed by: Matti Geschonneck
- Written by: Wolfgang Kohlhaase
- Based on: In Times of Fading Light by Eugen Ruge
- Starring: Bruno Ganz; Alexander Fehling; Sylvester Groth; Pit Bukowski; Evgenia Dodina; Stephan Grossmann
- Production companies: Moovie; ZDF; Constantin Film Produktion; Beta Cinema
- Distributed by: X Verleih AG (through Warner Bros. Pictures)
- Release dates: 16 February 2017 (Berlin); 1 June 2017 (Germany)
- Country: Germany
- Language: German

In Times of Fading Light (German: In Zeiten des abnehmenden Lichts) is a 2017 German drama film directed by Matti Geschonneck. The film shows a day in the life of a family in the GDR. It was screened in the Berlinale Special section at the 67th Berlin International Film Festival. It is based on the 2011 novel of the same name by Eugen Ruge.

Cineuropa describes it: "Thematically, dramatically and visually, this is a sombre, intelligent piece in which psychological finesse combines with historical analysis to result in genuine dramatic heft." In Times of Fading Light is an ensemble piece. Geschonneck contributes to this sombre theme challenging societal ideals, which expose the harshness of a new historical day.

== Cast ==
- Bruno Ganz as Wilhelm Powileit
- Hildegard Schmahl as Charlotte Powileit
- Sylvester Groth as Kurt Umnitzer
- Alexander Fehling as Alexander "Sascha" Umnitzer
- Natalia Belitski as Melitta Umnitzer
- Evgenia Dodina as Irina Umnitzer
- Angela Winkler as Stine Spier
- Stephan Grossmann as Harry Zenk
- Nina Antonova as Nadeschda Iwanowna
- Thorsten Merten as Tabbert
- Gabriela Maria Schmeide as Lisbeth
- Sophie Pfennigstorf as Nolle
- Inka Friedrich as Vera
- Stefan Haschke as Schlinger
- Axel Wandtke as Bunke
- Jörg Pose as Herr Sondermann
- Sarina Radomski as a Friendship Pioneer Leader
- Pit Bukowski as Worker
- Jean Denis Römer as Supplier
- Ronald Kukulies as TBA
- Nadja Engel as TBA
- Alexander Hörbe as TBA
- Rike Eckermann as TBA
- Friderikke-Maria Hörbe as TBA
