= Travnik (disambiguation) =

Travnik (Cyrillic: Травник, Slovak: Trávnik) is a Slavic place name, originally meaning 'meadow'. It may refer to:

In Bosnia-Herzegovina:

- Travnik, a city and municipality in central Bosnia-Herzegovina
- Novi Travnik, a town and municipality in central Bosnia-Herzegovina

In Bulgaria:

- Travnik, Bulgaria

In Slovakia:

- Trávnik (Hungarian: Komáromfüss), a village and municipality in the Komarno District, southwest Slovakia

In Slovenia:

- Travnik, Loški Potok, a village in the Municipality of Loški Potok, Slovenia
- Travnik, Cerkno, a small settlement in the Municipality of Cerkno, Slovenia
- Travnik, Semič, an abandoned settlement in the Municipality of Semič, Slovenia
- Travnik, a mountain near Trenta, Bovec and next the Italian border

Other:

- NK Travnik (Nogometni Klub Travnik), a football club in Travnik, Bosnia-Herzegovina
- SS Travnik, a steamship in service 1958–65
- Some local toponyms into Friuli region, Italy, especially in the slavic-speaking area, are referred as "Traunich" or "Traunigh" which has been also a local family nickname/surname. In Gorizia there was a "Piazza del Traunich" ("Meadow's square").

== See also ==
- Trávnica
- Trávníček
