= Eugen Ruge =

German writer and translator

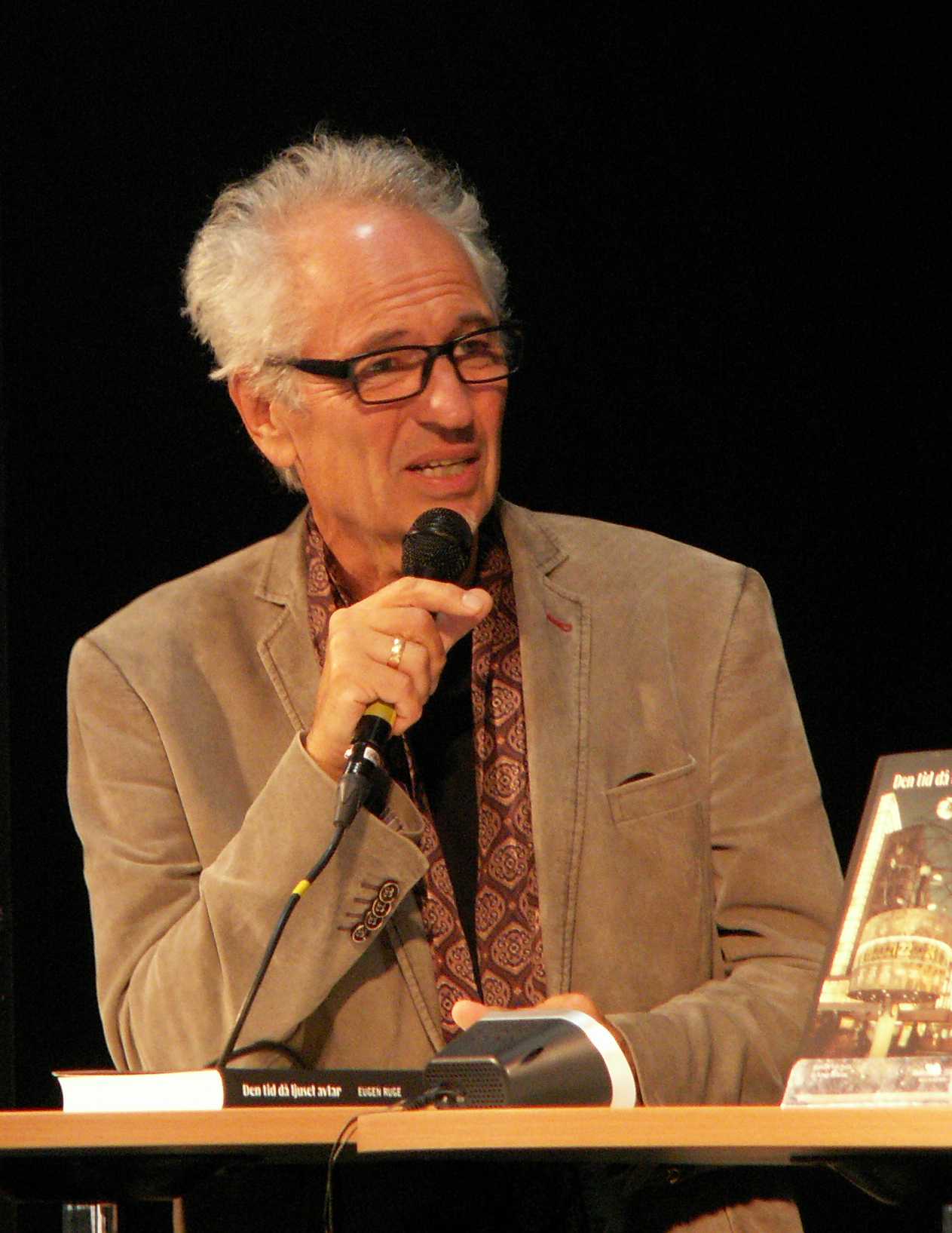
Ruge in 2016

Eugen Ruge (born 24 June 1954 in Sosva, Sverdlovsk Oblast, Soviet Union) is a German writer, director and translator from Russian. In 2011 he won the German Book Prize for In Times of Fading Light.

== Life and work ==
Ruge is the son of the East German historian Wolfgang Ruge, who had once been deported to Siberia by the Soviet state. At the age of two, Ruge came to East Berlin with his parents. After studying mathematics at Humboldt University, he worked as a research assistant at the GDR Academy of Sciences. In 1986, he began his career as a writer, documentary filmmaker and screenwriter. In 1988, he emigrated to West Germany. Since 1989 he has worked mainly as a writer for theatre, radio and film. In 2011 he debuted as a novelist with the title In Times of Fading Light, which won the German Book Prize and the Alfred Döblin Prize. The novel has been translated into English by Anthea Bell.

As a translator from Russian, Ruge has translated Chekhov among others. He is the father of four children and divides his time between Berlin and Rügen.

== Works ==
- In Zeiten des abnehmenden Lichts. Roman einer Familie ISBN 978-3-499-25412-3, OCLC 966298390
  - In times of fading light : the story of a family, Minneapolis, Minnesota: Graywolf Press, 2013. ISBN 978-1-55597-679-8, OCLC 903174340
- Cabo de Gata ISBN 978-3-499-26748-2, OCLC 982988693
  - Cabo de Gata a novel, Minneapolis, Minnesota Graywolf Press 2016. ISBN 978-1-55597-757-3, OCLC 962075039
