= Matti Geschonneck =

German film director (born 1952)

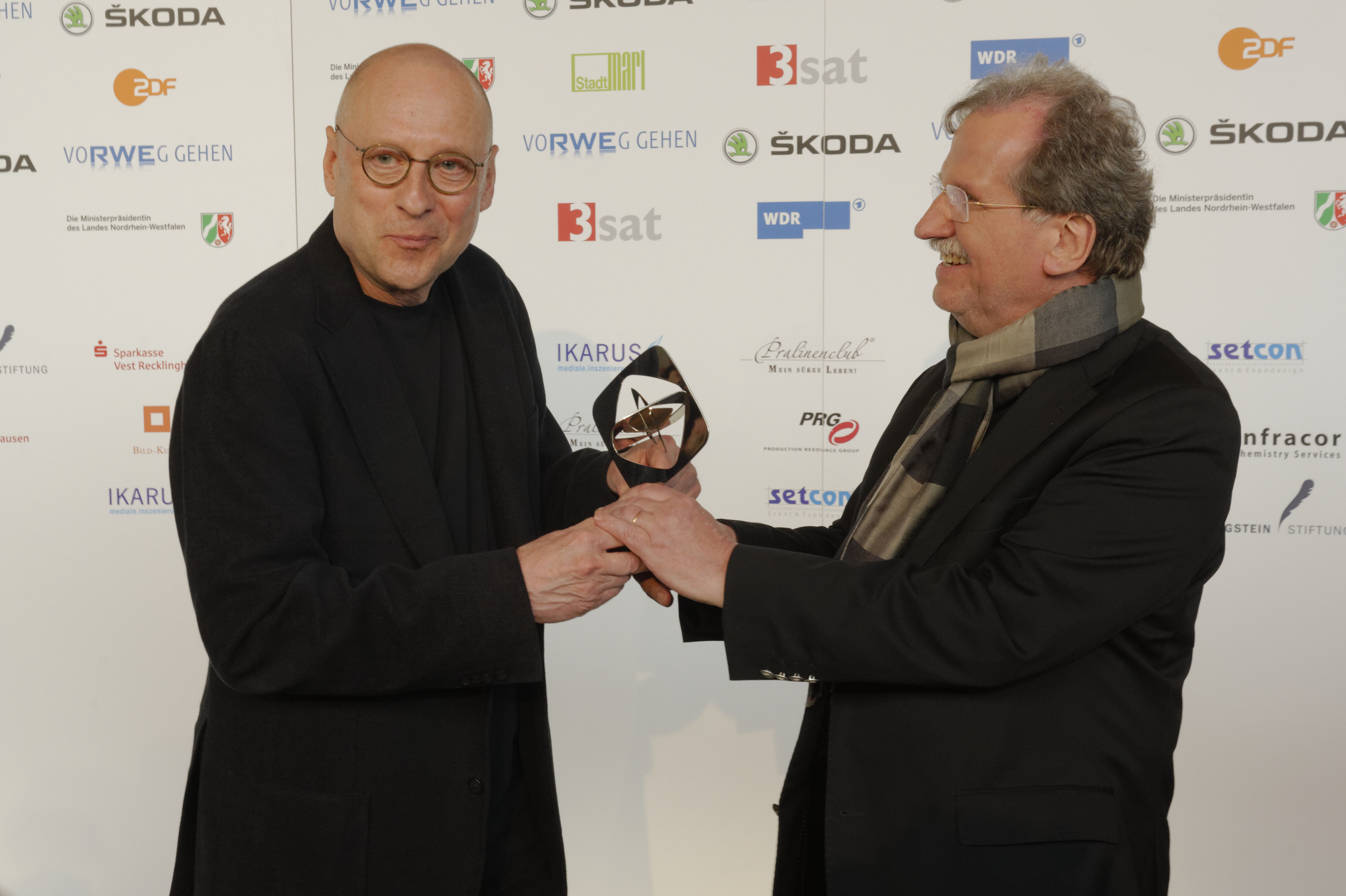
Matti Geschonneck (left) at 2013 Grimme-Preis ceremony.

Matti Geschonneck (born 8 May 1952 in Potsdam) is a German film director.

Geschonneck is the son of German actor Erwin Geschonneck, who was one of the most famous actors in East Germany, and a half-brother of German forensic specialist and author Alexander Geschonneck. He grew up with his mother, actress Hannelore Wüst, and step-father Gerhard Scheumann, a well-known East German documentary film maker. He studied at the Gerasimov Institute of Cinematography in Moscow, but was pulled from his studies and lost his Communist party membership for his support of dissident Wolf Biermann after Biermann was stripped of his East German citizenship in 1976. His first feature, an experimental film titled Licht im Zerfall, was seized and stored in the Soviet archives, with no copies known to have survived. Geschonneck used a work visa to move to West Germany in 1978.

After serving as an assistant director to Thomas Langhoff, Eberhard Fechner and Diethard Klante, Geschonneck released his first feature film Moebius in 1992, followed by a series of episodes of the popular German television crime series Tatort. In 1995, he directed the TV movie Matulla und Busch, which was the last film his father starred in. After years of TV work, his second theatrical release Boxhagener Platz debuted at the 2010 Berlin International Film Festival and was one of eight films shortlisted for the Academy Award for Best Foreign Language Film for that year. His 2017 film In Times of Fading Light debuted at the 67th Berlin International Film Festival. His 2022 TV film Die Wannseekonferenz, about the 1942 Wannsee Conference to plan the Holocaust, received multiple recognitions.

He has received a number of German film prizes.

Geschonneck is married to screenwriter and film director Ina Weisse.

== Selected filmography ==
- Moebius (1992)
- Angst hat eine kalte Hand (1995, TV film)
- The Cry of Love (1997, TV film)
- Der Rosenmörder (1998, TV film)
- From the Depths to the Heights (1999, TV film)
- Wer liebt, hat Recht (2002, TV film)
- Mord am Meer (2004, TV film)
- The News (2005, TV film)
- Silver Wedding (2006, TV film)
- Duel at Night (2007, TV film)
- Abducted (2009, TV film)
- Boxhagener Platz (2010)
- Death in Istanbul (2010, TV film)
- Years of Love (2011, TV film)
- Death of a Cop (2012, TV film)
- The Witness House (2014, TV film)
- A Grand Farewell (2015, TV film)
- In Times of Fading Light (2017)
- Unterleuten: The Torn Village (2020, TV serial)
- Die Wannseekonferenz (2022, TV film)
