= Festival of German-Language Literature =

German literary event

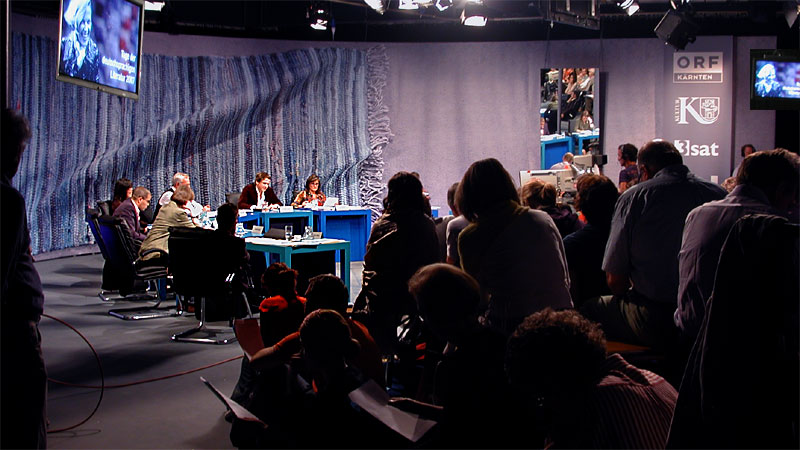
31. Festival of German-Language Literature / Ingeborg Bachmann Prize, 2007

The Festival of German-Language Literature (German: Tage der deutschsprachigen Literatur) is a literary event which takes place annually in Klagenfurt, Austria. During this major literary festival which lasts for several days a number of awards are given, the major one being the Ingeborg Bachmann Prize, first awarded in 1977 and one of the most important awards for literature in the German language.

== History ==
In the mid seventies, the journalist and writer Humbert Fink and the chairman of the Austrian Radio and TV (ORF) studio in Carinthia at that time, Ernst Willner, decided to establish a literary competition based on an event held by Gruppe 47. They were able to enlist Marcel Reich-Ranicki amongst others onto the original jury. The result was the Festival of German-Language Literature, which has taken place annually since 1977 and is televised live by ORF.

== The Ingeborg Bachmann Prize ==
The main prize of the Festival is given in memory of Ingeborg Bachmann (25 June 1926 – 17 October 1973), one of the most distinguished Austrian writers.

The prize winner is determined during a three-day reading event in which the invited candidates present their literary contributions, which have to be unpublished, to the nine-member professional jury and the public. Each presentation is about 25 minutes long and the original language of these contributions must be German. A moderator presents and guides the readings and the discussions of the jury and the writers have to convince both the jury and the public of the quality of their contributions.

In 2008, the jury was reduced to seven members, the competing writers from eighteen to fourteen. Since 2006, the Ingeborg Bachmann Prize has been endowed with 25,000 EUR.

== Other prizes ==
Several other literature prizes are awarded during the Festival, in total usually three to five awards. Over the years, additional sponsored prizes have been awarded:

- Deutschlandfunk Prize (EUR 12,500)
- Jury Prize, aka Kelag Prize (since 2000, EUR 10,000)
- 3sat Prize (given by 3sat, EUR 7,500)
- BKS Bank Audience Prize (since 2002, EUR 7,000)
- Ernst Willner Prize (EUR 7,000)
- Editor's special prize

== Prize winners ==
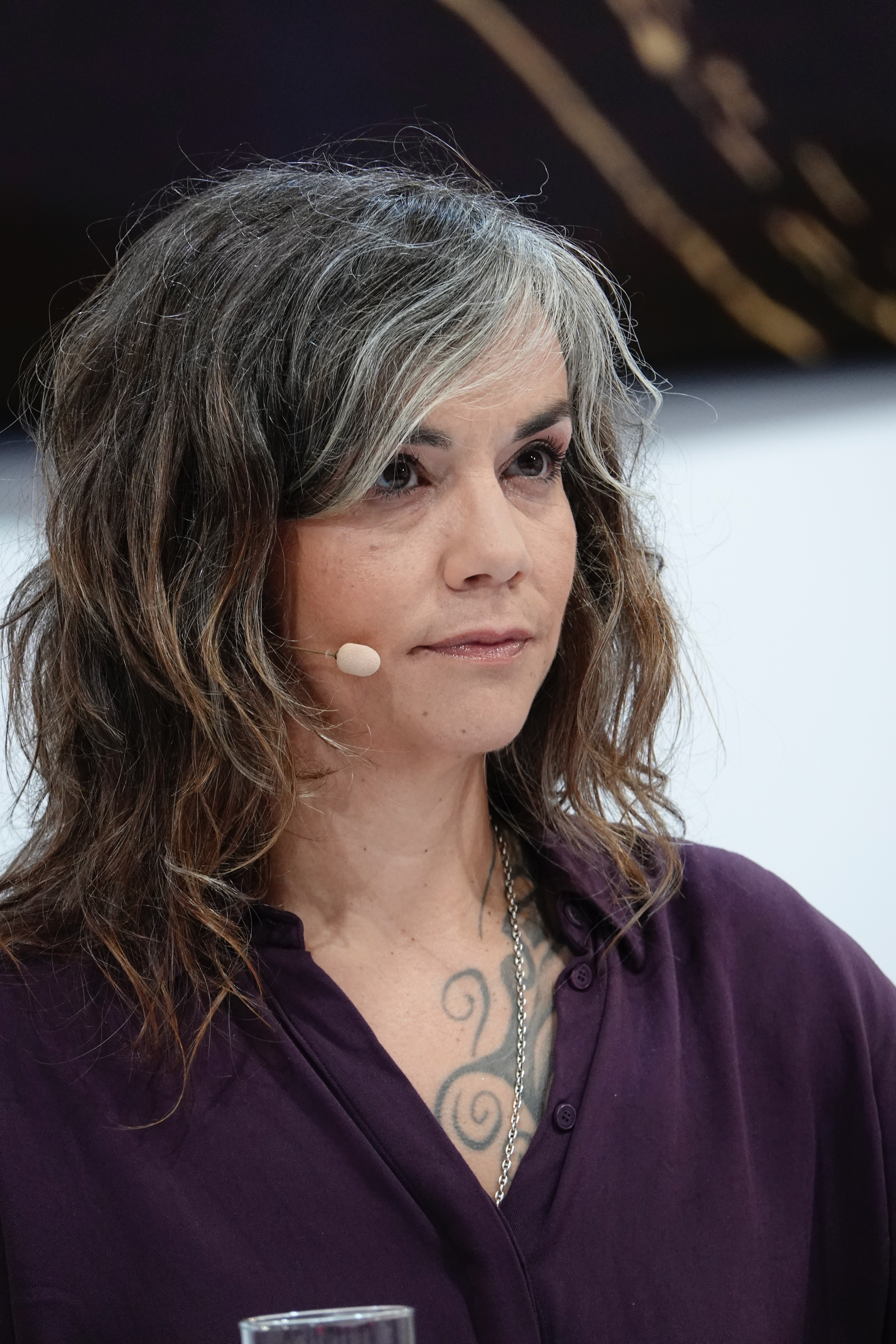
Natascha Gangl – Winner of the Ingeborg Bachmann Prize for 2025

- 2026 Festival
  - Ingeborg Bachmann Prize: Lena Schätte: Was wir tragen
  - Deutschlandfunk Prize: Ozan Zakariya Keskinkilic: Vater ohne Sohn
  - 3sat Prize: Magdalena Schrefel: Kirschen, Herz mit Verband
  - Kelag Prize: Kinga Toth: OstblockMädl
  - BKS-Bank Audience Prize: Lena Schätte: Was wir tragen
- 2025 Festival
  - Ingeborg Bachmann Prize: Natascha Gangl: da Sta
  - Deutschlandfunk Prize: Boris Schumatsky: Kindheitsbenzin
  - Kelag Prize: Nora Osagiobare: Daughter Issues
  - 3sat Prize: Almut Tina Schmidt: Fast eine Geschichte
  - BKS-Bank Audience Prize: Natascha Gangl: Da Sta
  - Festival-Schreiber:in Carinthischer Sommer: Tara Meister.
- 2024 Festival
  - Ingeborg Bachmann Prize: Tijan Sila: Der Tag, an dem meine Mutter verrückt wurde
  - Deutschlandfunk Prize: Denis Pfabe: Die Möglichkeit einer Ordnung
  - Kelag Prize: Tamara Štajner: Luft nach unten
  - 3sat Prize: Johanna Sebauer: Das Gurkerl
  - BKS-Bank Audience Prize: Johanna Sebauer: Das Gurkerl
  - Stadtschreiber-Stipendium der Stadt Klagenfurt: Johanna Sebauer
- 2023 Festival
  - Ingeborg Bachmann Prize: Valeria Gordeev: Er putzt
  - Deutschlandfunk Prizr: Anna Felnhofer: Fische fangen
  - Kelag Prize: Martin Piekar: Mit Wänden sprechen/Pole sind schwierige Volk
  - 3sat Prize: Laura Leupi: Das Alphabet der sexualisierten Gewalt
  - BKS-Bank Audience Prize: Martin Piekar: Mit Wänden sprechen/Pole sind schwierige Volk
  - Stadtschreiber-Stipendium der Stadt Klagenfurt: Martin Piekar
- 2022 Festival
  - Ingeborg Bachmann Prize: Ana Marwan: Wechselkröte
  - Deutschlandfunk Prize: Alexandru Bulucz: Einige Landesgrenzen weiter östlich, von hier aus gesehen
  - Kelag Prize: Juan S. Guse: Im Falle des Druckabfalls
  - 3sat Prize: Leon Engler: Liste der Dinge, die nicht so sind, wie sie sein sollten
  - BKS Prize of the Audience: Elias Hirschl: Staublunge
- 2021 Festival
  - Ingeborg Bachmann Prize: Nava Ebrahimi: Der Cousin
  - Deutschlandfunk Prize: Dana Vowinckel: Gewässer im Ziplock
  - Kelag Prize: Necati Öziri: Morgen wache ich auf und dann beginnt das Leben
  - 3sat Prize: Timon Karl Kaleyta: Mein Freund am See
  - BKS Prize of the Audience: Necati Öziri
- 2020 Festival (virtual)
  - Ingeborg Bachmann Prize: Helga Schubert: Vom Aufstehen
  - Deutschlandfunk Prize: Lisa Krusche: Für bestimmte Welten kämpfen und gegen andere
  - Kelag Prize: Egon Christian Leitner: Immer im Krieg
  - 3sat Prize: Laura Freudenthaler: Der heißeste Sommer
  - BKS Prize of the Audience: Lydia Haider: Der große Gruß
- 2019 Festival
  - Ingeborg Bachmann Prize: Birgit Birnbacher: Der Schrank
  - Deutschlandfunk Prize: Leander Fischer: Nymphenverzeichnis Muster Nummer eins Goldkopf
  - Kelag Prize: Julia Jost: Unweit vom Schakaltal
  - 3sat Prize: Yannic Han Biao Federer: Kenn ich nicht
  - BKS Prize of the Audience: Ronya Othmann: Vierundsiebzig
- 2018 Festival
  - Ingeborg Bachmann Prize: Tanya Malyarchuk: Frösche im Meer
  - Deutschlandfunk Prize: Bov Bjerg: SERPENTINEN
  - Kelag Prize: Özlem Özgül Dündar: und ich brenne
  - 3sat Prize: Anna Stern: Warten auf Ava
  - BKS Prize of the Audience: Raphaela Edelbauer: Das Loch
- 2017 Festival
  - Ingeborg Bachmann Prize: Ferdinand Schmalz: mein lieblingstier heißt winter
  - Deutschlandfunk Prize: John Wray: Madrigal
  - Kelag Prize: Eckhart Nickel: Hysteria
  - 3sat Prize: Gianna Molinari: Loses Mappe
  - BKS Prize of the Audience: Karin Peschka: Wiener Kindl
- 2016 Festival
  - Ingeborg Bachmann Prize: Sharon Dodua Otoo, Herr Gröttrup setzt sich hin
  - Kelag Prize: Dieter Zwicky, Los Alamos ist winzig
  - 3sat Prize: Julia Wolf (writer), WALTER NOWAK BLEIBT LIEGEN
  - BKS Prize of the Audience: Stefanie Sargnagel, Penne vom Kika
- 2015 Festival
  - Ingeborg Bachmann Prize: Nora Gomringer, Recherche
  - Kelag Prize: Valerie Fritsch, Das Bein
  - 3sat Prize: Dana Grigorcea, Das primäre Gefühl der Schuldlosigkeit
  - BKS Prize of the Audience: Valerie Fritsch, Das Bein
- 2014 Festival
  - Ingeborg Bachmann Prize: Tex Rubinowitz, Wir waren niemals hier
  - Kelag Prize: Michael Fehr, Simeliberg
  - 3sat Prize: Senthuran Varatharajah, Vor der Zunahme der Zeichen
  - Ernst Willner Prize: Katharina Gericke, DOWN DOWN DOWN To The Queen Of Chinatown
  - Prize of the Audience: Gertraud Klemm, Ujjayi
- 2013 Festival
  - Ingeborg Bachmann Prize: Katja Petrowskaja, Vielleicht Esther
  - Kelag Prize: Verena Güntner, Es bringen
  - 3sat Prize: Benjamin Maack, „Wie man einen Käfer richtig fängt“ by Joachim Kaltenbach
  - Ernst Willner Prize: Heinz Helle, Wir sind schön
  - Prize of the Audience: Nadine Kegele, Scherben schlucken
- 2012 Festival
  - Ingeborg Bachmann Prize: Olga Martynowa for Ich werde sagen: ‚Hi!‘
  - Kelag Prize: Matthias Nawrat for Unternehmer
  - 3sat Prize: Lisa Kränzler for Willste abhauen
  - Ernst Willner Prize: Inger-Maria Mahlke
  - Prize of the Audience: Cornelia Travnicek for Junge Hunde
- 2011 Festival
  - Ingeborg Bachmann Prize: Maja Haderlap for Im Kessel
  - Kelag Prize: Steffen Popp for Spur einer Dorfgeschichte
  - 3sat Prize: Nina Bußmann for Große Ferien
  - Ernst Willner Prize: Leif Randt for Schimmernder Dunst über CobyCounty
  - Prize of the Audience: Thomas Klupp for 9to5 Hardcore
- 2010 Festival
  - Ingeborg Bachmann Prize: Peter Wawerzinek for Rabenliebe
  - Kelag Prize: Dorothee Elmiger for Einladung an die Waghalsigen
  - 3sat Prize: Judith Zander for Dinge, die wir heute sagten
  - Ernst Willner Prize: Aleks Scholz for Google Earth
  - Prize of the Audience: Peter Wawerzinek for Rabenliebe
- 2009 Festival
  - Ingeborg Bachmann Prize: Jens Petersen for Bis dass der Tod
  - Kelag Prize: Ralf Bönt for Der Fotoeffekt
  - 3sat Prize: Gregor Sander for Winterfisch
  - Ernst Willner Prize: Katharina Born for Fifty Fifty
  - Prize of the Audience: Karsten Krampitz for Heimgehen
- 2008 Festival
  - Ingeborg Bachmann Prize: Tilman Rammstedt for Der Kaiser von China]
  - Telekom Austria Prize: Markus Orths: Das Zimmermädchen
  - 3sat Prize: Patrick Findeis for Kein schöner Land
  - Ernst Willner Prize: Clemens J. Setz for Die Waage
  - Prize of the Audience: Tilman Rammstedt for Der Kaiser von China
- 2007
  - Ingeborg Bachmann Prize: Lutz Seiler for Turksib
  - Telekom Austria Prize: Thomas Stangl for Ohne Titel ohne Ende
  - 3sat Prize: PeterLicht for Die Geschichte meiner Einschätzung am Anfang des dritten Jahrtausends
  - Ernst Willner Prize: Jan Böttcher for Freundwärts
  - Prize of the Audience: PeterLicht for Die Geschichte meiner Einschätzung am Anfang des dritten Jahrtausends
- 2006
  - Ingeborg Bachmann Prize: Kathrin Passig: Sie befinden sich hier
  - Telekom Austria Prize: Bodo Hell for Stadt Land Berg
  - 3sat Prize: Norbert Scheuer for Überm Rauschen
  - Ernst Willner Prize: Angelika Overath for Das Aquarium
  - Prize of the Audience: Kathrin Passig: Sie befinden sich hier
- 2005
  - Ingeborg Bachmann Prize: Thomas Lang: Am Seil
  - Telekom Austria Prize: Julia Schoch for Der Ritt durch den Feind
  - 3sat Prize: Anne Weber for Auszug
  - Ernst Willner Prize: Natalie Balkow for Oben, wo nichts mehr ist
  - Prize of the Audience: Saša Stanišić for Was wir im Keller spielen …
- 2004 Uwe Tellkamp: Der Schlaf in den Uhren
- 2003 Inka Parei: Excerpts from the novel Was Dunkelheit war
- 2002 Peter Glaser: Geschichte von Nichts
- 2001 Michael Lentz: Muttersterben
- 2000 Georg Klein: Excerpt from a long work of prose
- 1999 Terézia Mora: Der Fall Ophelia
- 1998 Sibylle Lewitscharoff: PONG.
- 1997 Norbert Niemann: Wie man's nimmt
- 1996 Jan Peter Bremer: Der Fürst sprich
  - Bertelsmann literature prize: Lydia Mischkulnig for Bande,
  - Carinthia Prize: Johannes Jansen (writer) for Dickicht Anpassung.
  - Ernst Wilner Prize: Felicitas Hoppe for Das Richtfest.
  - 3sat Stipendium: Heiko Michael Hartmann for MOI.
- 1995 Franzobel: Die Krautflut
- 1994 Reto Hänny: Guai
  - Carinthia Prize: Raoul Schrott: Ludwig Höhnel – Totenheft
  - 3sat Award: Doron Rabinovici: Mullemann
- 1993 Kurt Drawert: "Haus ohne Menschen. Ein Zustand"
- 1992 Alissa Walser: "Geschenkt"
- 1991 Emine Sevgi Özdamar: "Das Leben ist eine Karawanserei"
- 1990 Birgit Vanderbeke: "Das Muschelessen"
- 1989 Wolfgang Hilbig: "Eine Übertragung"
- 1988 Angela Krauß: "Der Dienst"
- 1987 Uwe Saeger: "Ohne Behinderung, ohne falsche Bewegung"
- 1986 Katja Lange-Müller: "Kaspar Mauser – Die Feigheit vorm Freund"
- 1985 Hermann Burger: "Die Wasserfallfinsternis von Bad Gastein"
- 1984 Erica Pedretti: "Das Modell und sein Maler"
  - Award: Thomas Strittmatter: "Der Schwarzwursthammer"
- 1983 Friederike Roth: From "Das Buch des Lebens"
- 1982 Jürg Amann: "Rondo"
  - Federation of Austrian Industry Prize: Einar Schleef: Wittenbergplatz
- 1981 Urs Jaeggi: Ruth
- 1980 Sten Nadolny: Kopenhagen 1801
- 1979 Gert Hofmann: Die Fistelstimme
  - Award: Walter Müller: Apokalypso
- 1978 Ulrich Plenzdorf: kein runter kein fern
- 1977 Gert Jonke: Erster Entwurf zum Beginn einer sehr langen Erzählung

== See also ==
- Ingeborg Bachmann
- German literature
- List of literary awards
- List of poetry awards
- List of years in literature
- List of years in poetry
- Literary award
