= Cornelia Travnicek =

Austrian writer (born 1987)

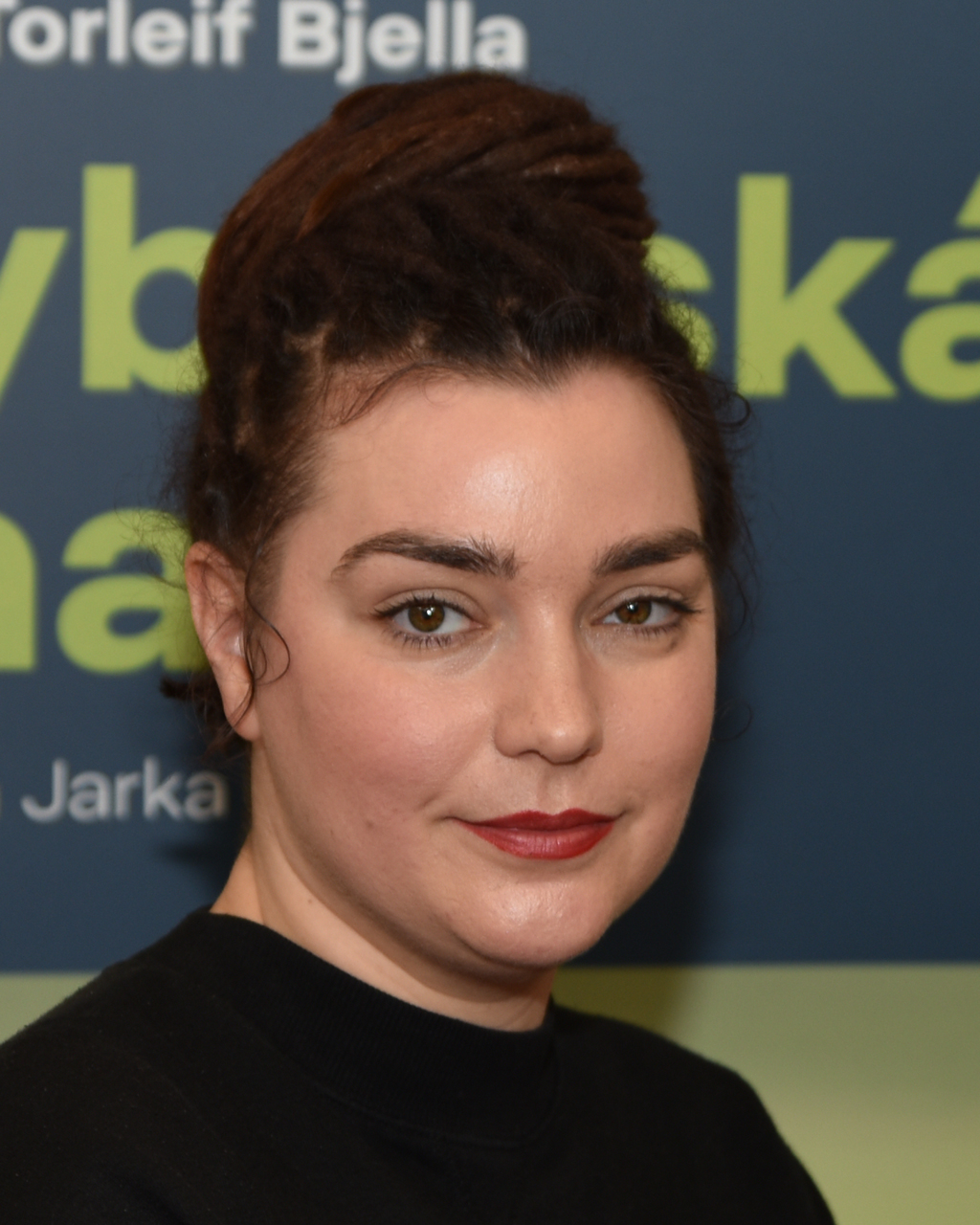
- Cornelia Travnicek (2023)
- Born: 1987; Sankt Pölten
- Awards: Writer in Residence of Klagenfurt (2013)

Cornelia Travnicek (born 1987 in St. Pölten, Lower Austria) is an Austrian writer who has published several books and stories.

== Life ==
Travnicek lives in Lower Austria, Austria. She studied Sinology and Informatics at the University of Vienna and works part-time as a researcher for the VRVis Zentrum für Virtual Reality und Visualisierung. Some of her work has been translated to English, Spanish, Italian, Polish and Serbian. She is represented by the Simon Literary Agency.

== List of works ==
- Chucks - 2012 ISBN 9783442747023, OCLC 869891530
- Fütter mich (Feed me) - 2009. ISBN 9783709978764, OCLC 965632504
- Die Asche meiner Schwester (The ashes of my sister) - 2008
- Aurora Borealis - 2008 ISBN 9783852528755, OCLC 228138654
- spannung spiel und schokolade (live play and chocolate) - 2008
- Junge Hunde (young dogs) - 2015

== Awards ==
- Recognition Award of the State of Lower Austria (Category Literature) 2012
- Audience Award at the German Literature Days 2012
- Lise-Meitner Literature Prize 2009
- 3rd Place at FM4 wording 2009
- Theodor-Körner Award 2008
- Marlen Haushofer Prize 2007
- Hans Weigel Literature Scholarship for 2006/2007
- Youngster of Arts award from the city of St. Pölten 2006
- 2nd Place at FM4 wording 2006
- Prize for young writers at "writing between cultures" club-exile 2005
- "Marianne von Willemer" Award - Literature Prize 2005
- Audience Award at Hattinger Award for Young Literature 2004

== See also ==
- Cornelia Travnicek Official Website
