= German Book Prize =

Prize awarded to German-language novels

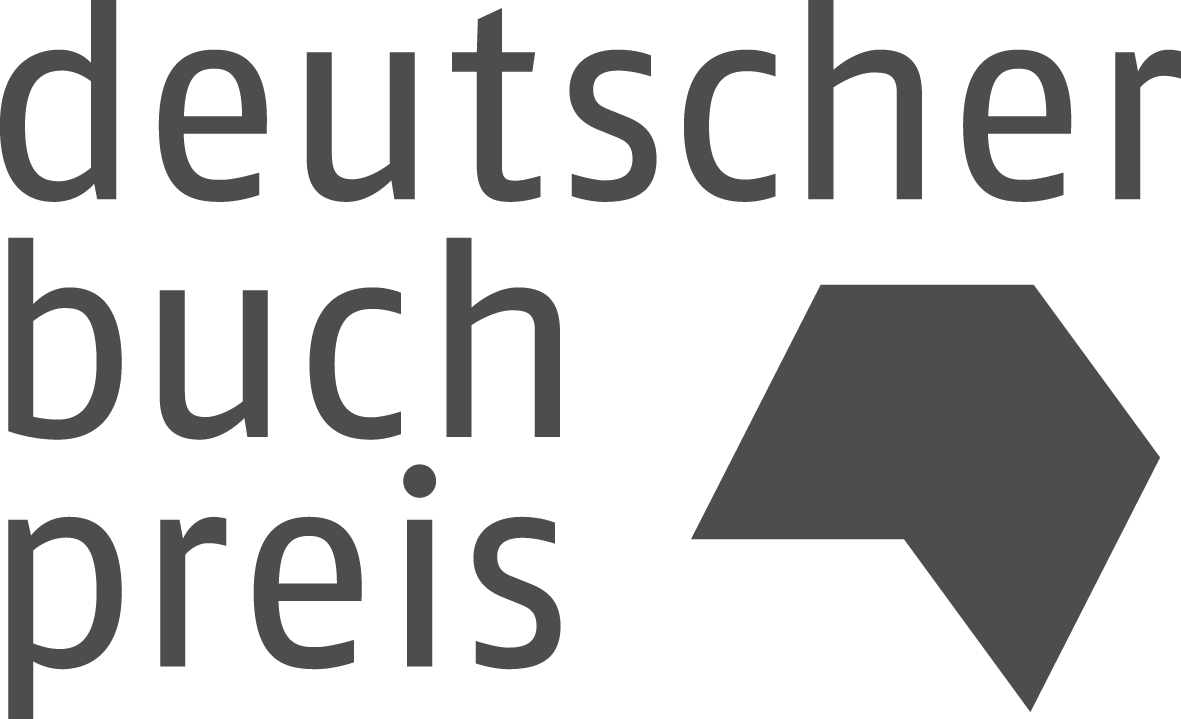
- Country: Germany
- Presented by: German Publishers and Booksellers Association (Börsenverein des Deutschen Buchhandels)
- Hosted by: Frankfurt Book Fair
- Reward: €25,000
- First award: 2005
- Website: deutscher-buchpreis.de (in German, English, and French)

The German Book Prize (German: Deutscher Buchpreis) is awarded annually, in October, by the German Publishers and Booksellers Association (Börsenverein des Deutschen Buchhandels) to the best new German-language novel of the year. The books, published in Germany, Austria and Switzerland, are nominated by their publishers, who can propose up to two books from their current or planned publication list. The books should be in shops before the short-list is announced in September of the award year. The winner is awarded €25,000, while the five shortlisted authors receive €2,500 each. It is presented annually during the Frankfurt Book Fair.

The prize was created in 2005, as a successor to the Deutscher Bücherpreis, to heighten awareness for authors writing in German. It is based on the same idea as literary prizes such as the Booker Prize or the Prix Goncourt.

== Recipients ==
- 2005: Geiger, Arno. Es geht uns gut [We Are Doing Fine]. Carl Hanser Verlag.
- 2006: Hacker, Katharina. Die Habenichtse [The Have-Nots]. Suhrkamp Verlag.
- 2007: Franck, Julia. Die Mittagsfrau [The Blindness of the Heart]. S. Fischer Verlag.
- 2008: Tellkamp, Uwe. Der Turm [The Tower]. Suhrkamp Verlag.
- 2009: Schmidt, Kathrin. Du stirbst nicht [You're not dying]. Kiepenheuer & Witsch.
- 2010: Abonji, Melinda Nadj. Tauben fliegen auf [Fly Away, Pigeon]. Jung und Jung Verlag.
- 2011: Ruge, Eugen. In Zeiten des abnehmenden Lichts [In Times of Fading Light]. Rowohlt Verlag.
- 2012: Krechel, Ursula. Landgericht. Jung und Jung Verlag.
- 2013: Mora, Terézia. Das Ungeheuer. Luchterhand.
- 2014: Seiler, Lutz. Kruso [Kruso]. Suhrkamp Verlag.
- 2015: Witzel, Frank. Die Erfindung der Roten Armee Fraktion durch einen manisch-depressiven Teenager im Sommer 1969. btb Verlag.
- 2016: Kirchhoff, Bodo. Widerfahrnis. Frankfurter Verlagsanstalt.
- 2017: Menasse, Robert. Die Hauptstadt [The Capital]. Suhrkamp Verlag.
- 2018: Mahlke, Inger-Maria. Archipel. Rowohlt.
- 2019: Stanišić, Saša. Herkunft [Where You Come From]. Luchterhand Literaturverlag.
- 2020: Weber, Anne. Annette, ein Heldinnenepos [Epic Annette: A Heroine's Tale]. Verlag Matthes & Seitz.
- 2021: Strubel, Antje Rávik. Blaue Frau [Blue Woman]. S. Fischer Verlag.
- 2022: de l'Horizon, Kim. Blutbuch [Sea, Mothers, Swallow, Tongues]. DuMont Buchverlag.
- 2023: Schachinger, Tonio. Echtzeitalter. Rowohlt-Verlag.
- 2024: Hefter, Martina. Hey guten Morgen, wie geht es dir? [Hey good morning, how are you?]. Klett-Cotta.
- 2025: Elmiger, Dorothee. Die Holländerinnen [The Dutch Women]. Hanser Verlag.
- 2026: Bazyar, Shida. Die Lücken. Kiepenheuer & Witsch.
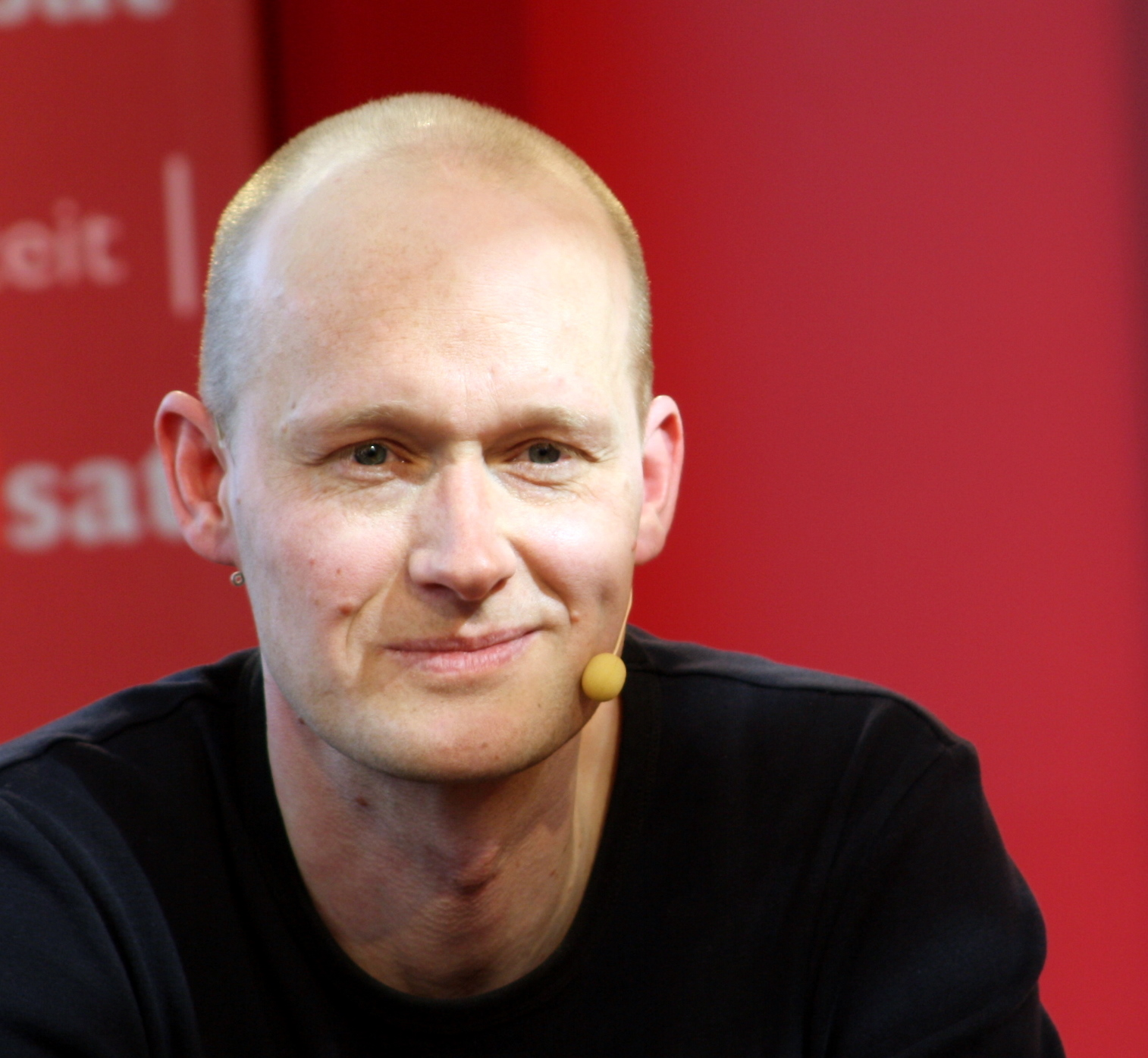
Arno Geiger

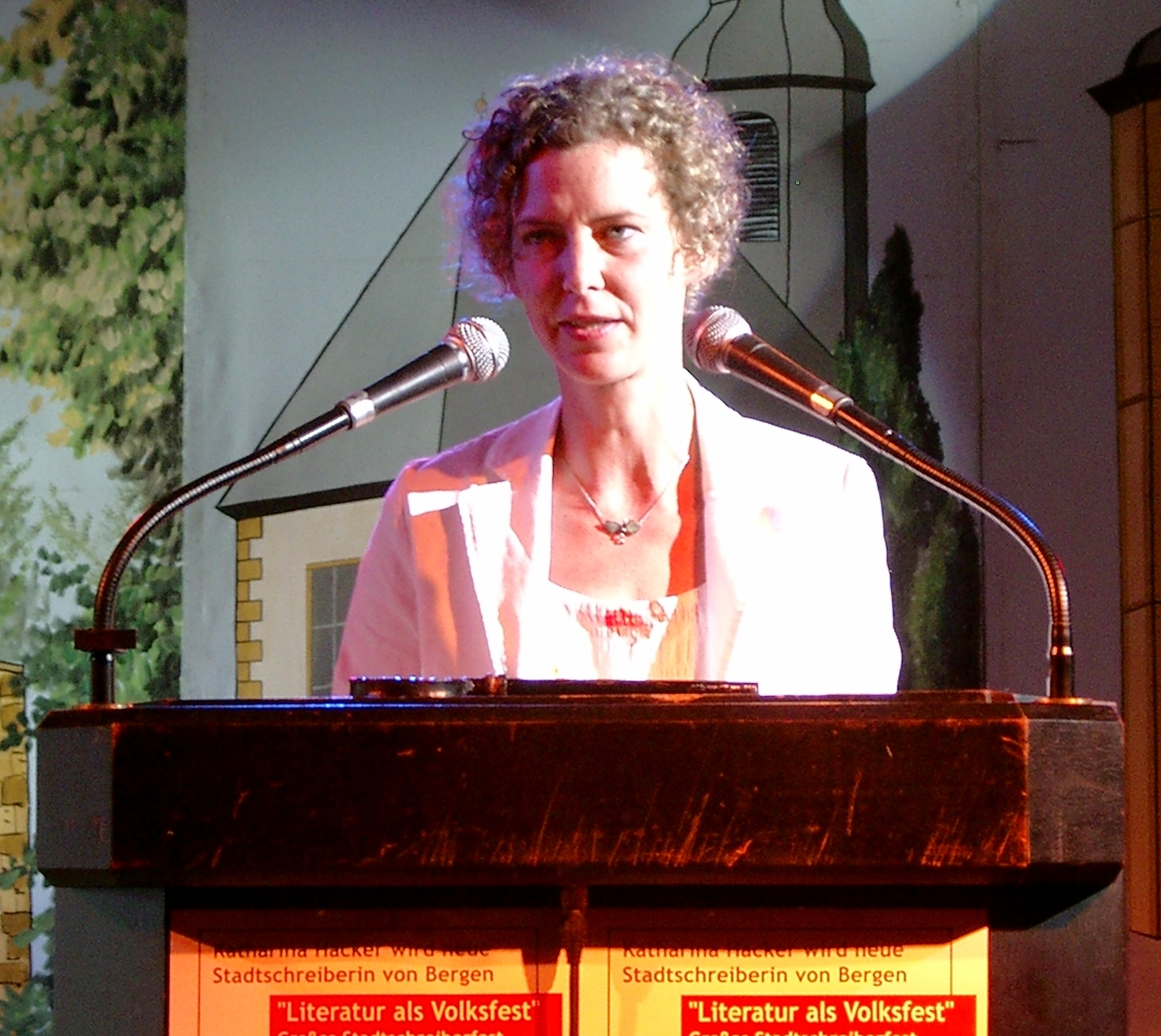
Katharina Hacker

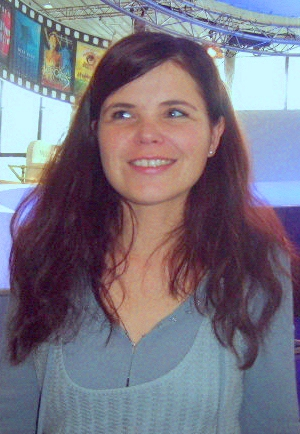
Julia Franck

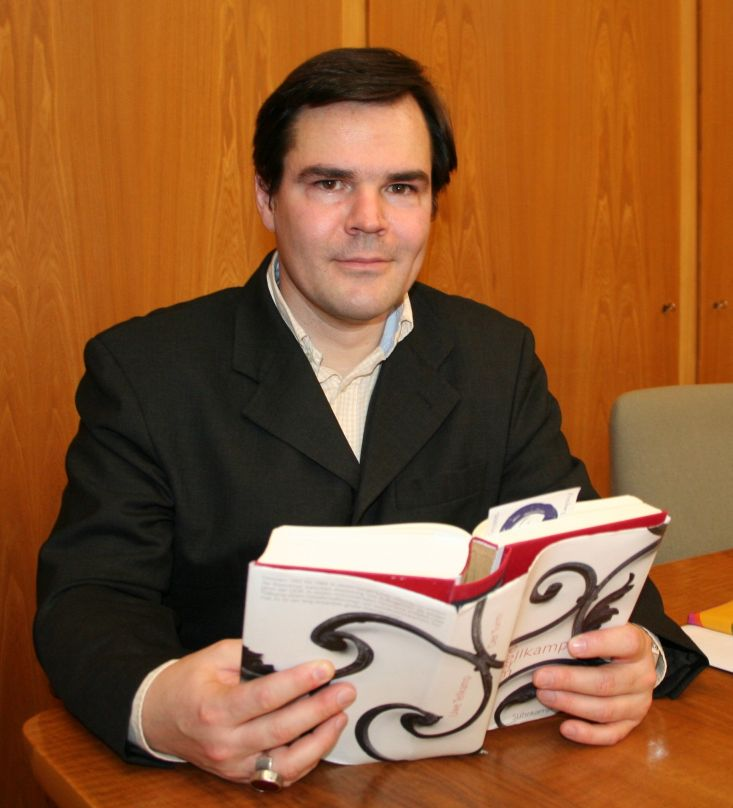
Uwe Tellkamp

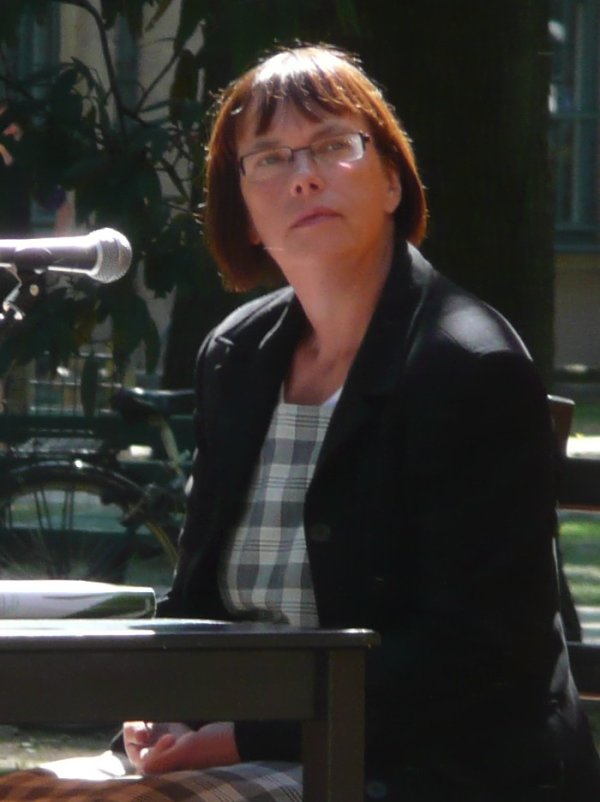
Kathrin Schmidt

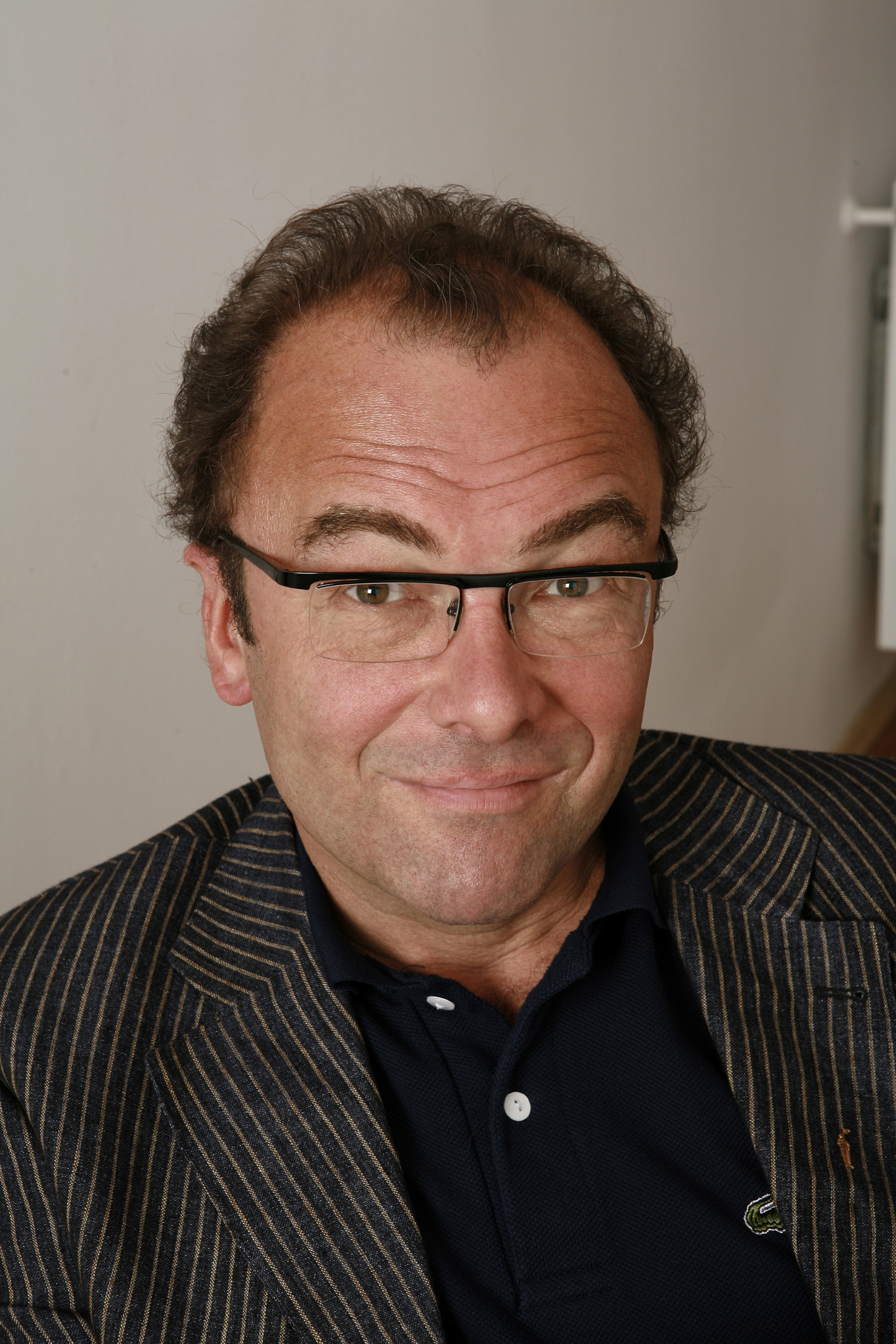
Robert Menasse

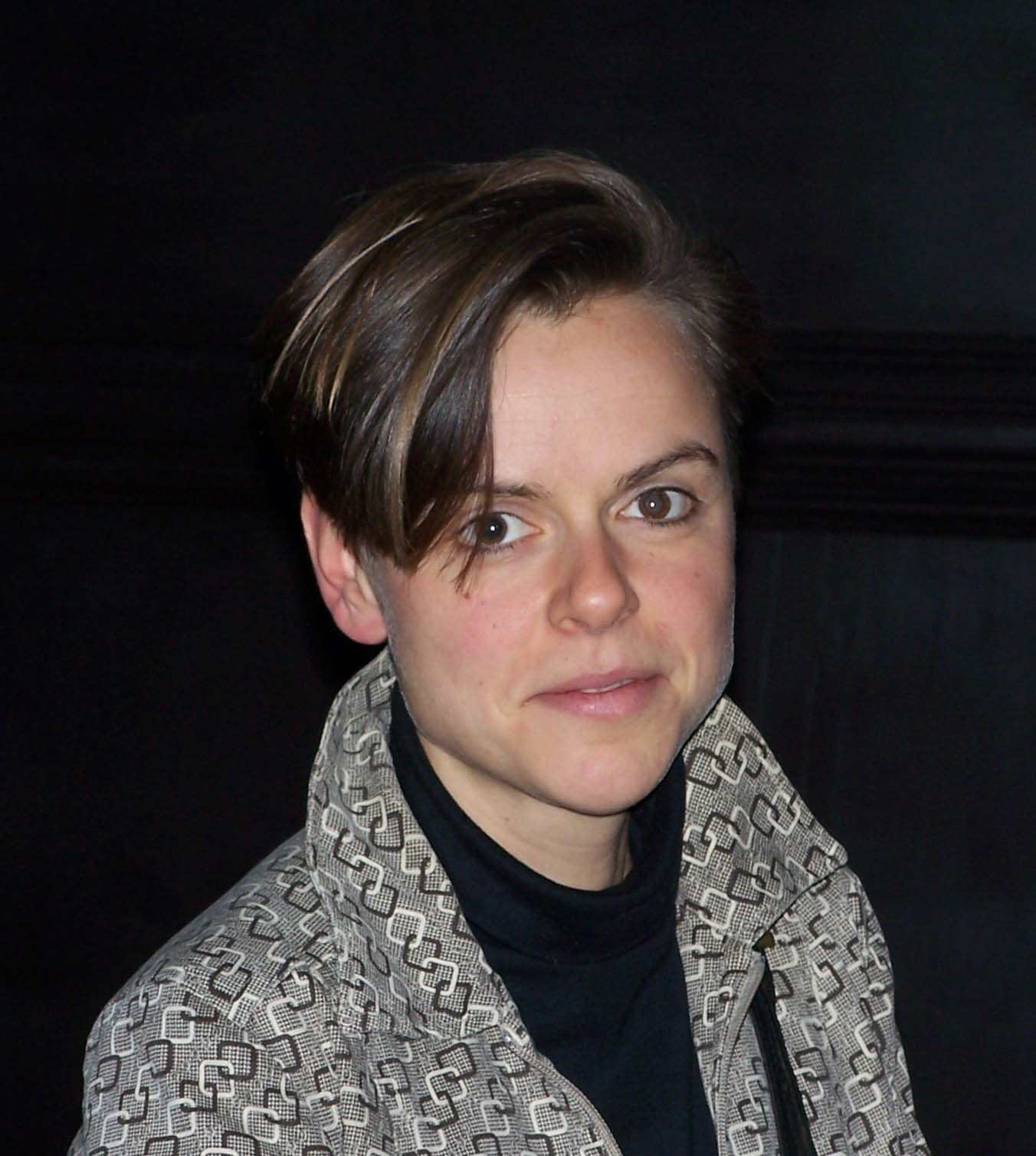
Antje Rávik Strubel

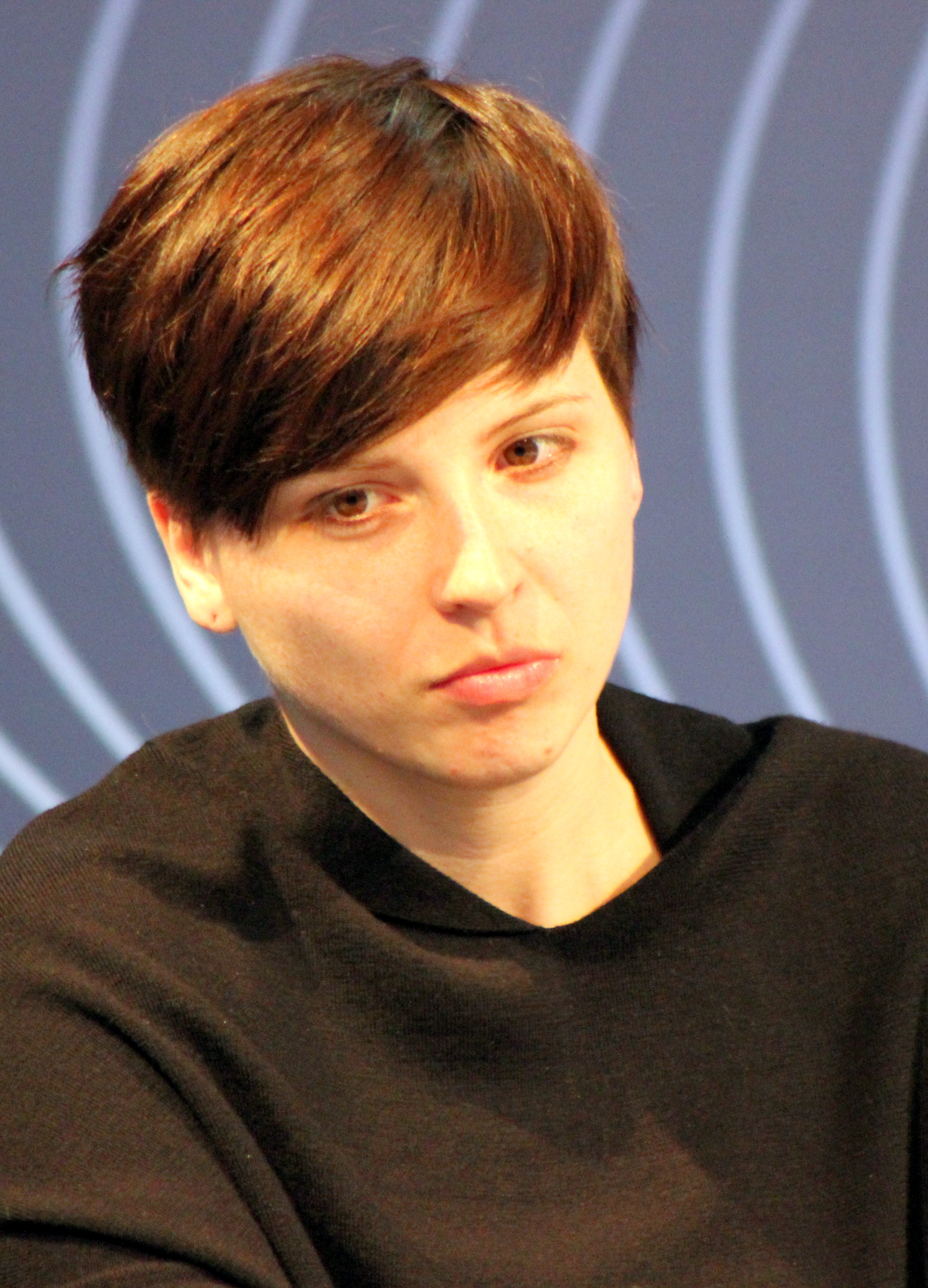
Dorothee Elmiger
