= Martin Werhand =

German publisher, editor and writer

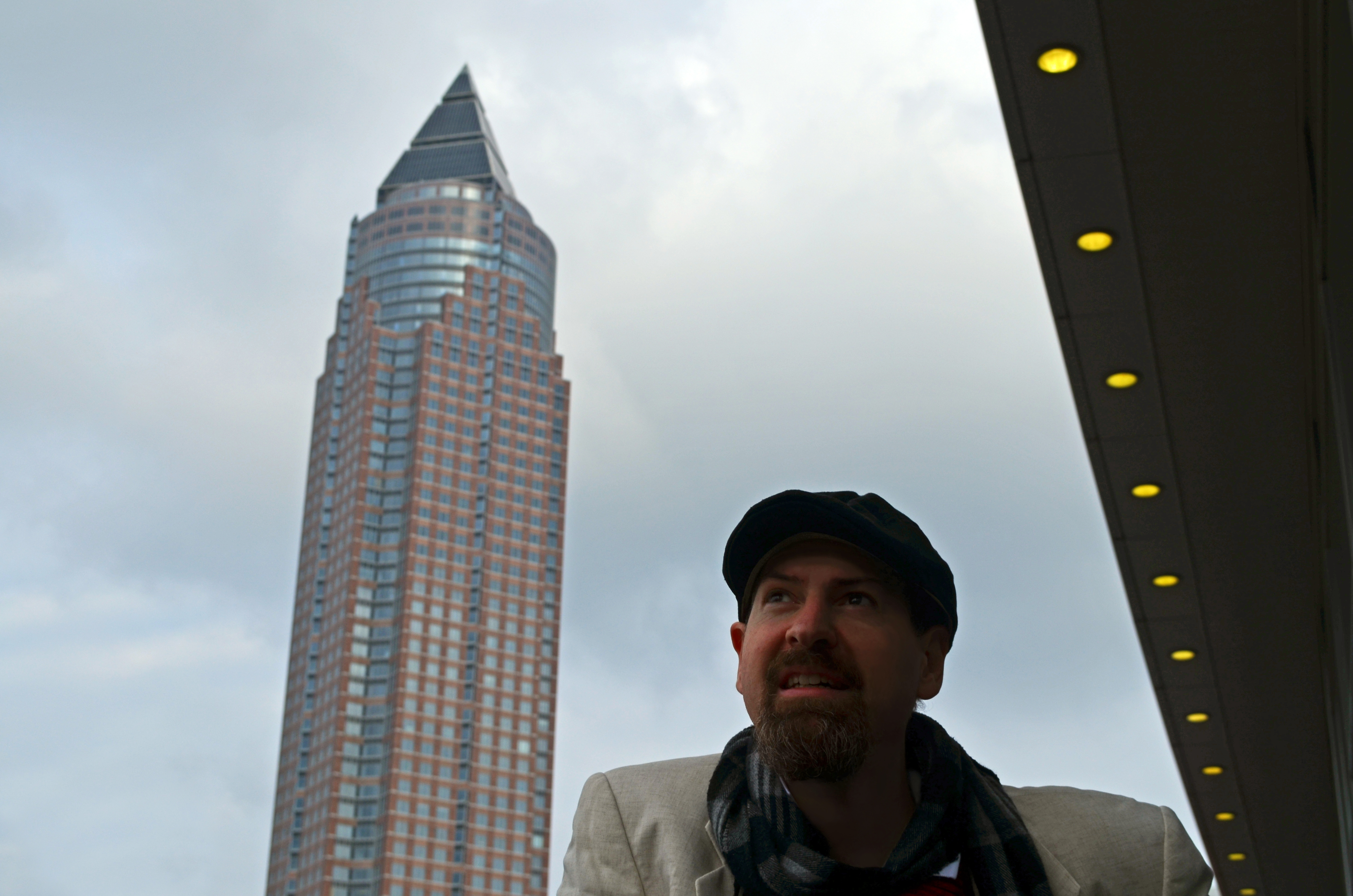
- Born: 13 May 1968 (age 58); Neuwied, Rhineland-Palatinate, Germany
- Occupations: Publisher, editor and author
- Years active: 1999–present
- Website: Official website of Martin Werhand (in German)

Martin Werhand (born 13 May 1968 in Neuwied, Rhineland-Palatinate) is a German publisher, editor and writer. 1997 he founded the publishing house Martin Werhand Verlag in Melsbach with focus on Fiction.

== Life and work ==
Martin Peter Werhand was born in 1968 as son of artisan blacksmith Klaus Rudolf Werhand. After attaining the Abitur in 1988 at Werner-Heisenberg-Gymnasium in Neuwied, Werhand studied in Cologne German language and literature studies between 1992 und 1997 (amongst other under Günter Blamberger, English language and literature studies (under Ansgar Nünning) and theatre, film and media (under Renate Möhrmann at the University of Cologne. Whilst still studying, Werhand decided in 1997 to establish an independent literature publishing company. As publisher and editor he took care of the works of numerous young authors in the anthology series Junge Lyrik between 1999 and 2002. Starting with the first book of the series followed by Junge Lyrik II and Junge Lyrik III, numerous readings took place in Rhineland-Palatinate and North Rhine-Westphalia. 2006 he published the poetry anthology Die Jahreszeiten der Liebe. Since 2014 Werhand publishes apart from the anthologies also several series of poetry books.

In 2016 the Martin Werhand Verlag presented some new book series at Frankfurt Book Fair like 50 zeitlose Gedichte or 50 Gedichte.

Martin Werhand lives and works in Melsbach, Rhineland-Palatinate.

== Poetry projects (selection) ==
Since 1999 Martin Werhand realised as a publisher, editor and author together with institutions, bookshops and other publishers numerous poetry projects, for example on World Book Day on 23 April 2003 in Münster, together with the Thalia Holding, where he presented himself as editor of the book and also as author together with six other poets, among them Florian Cieslik, Patric Hemgesberg and Thomas Bruns. Also in 2006, as the Bremer Straßenbahn AG under the direction of Dr. Joachim Tuz, he organized the project Poesie Bewegt (Poetry Moves) with many authors of Martin Werhand Verlag. Martin Werhand also contributed as an author

== Publications (selection) ==
=== Classic fiction (selection) ===
- Traumfahrt: 50 zeitlose Gedichte, Achim von Akerman 2016, ISBN 978-3-943910-70-4.
- Graunebel: 50 zeitlose Gedichte, Max Geißler 2016, ISBN 978-3-943910-71-1.
- Totentanz: 50 zeitlose Gedichte, Franz Werfel 2016, ISBN 978-3-943910-72-8.
- Schneewinter: 50 zeitlose Gedichte, Stefan Zweig 2016, ISBN 978-3-943910-73-5.
- Grabgang: 50 zeitlose Gedichte, Frida Schanz 2016, ISBN 978-3-943910-74-2.
- Traumgesicht: 50 zeitlose Gedichte, Albrecht Haushofer 2016, ISBN 978-3-943910-75-9.
- Wegwarte: 50 zeitlose Gedichte, Isolde Kurz 2016, ISBN 978-3-943910-85-8.
- Tagesanbruch: 50 zeitlose Gedichte, Gustav Falke 2017, ISBN 978-3-943910-80-3.
- Geistesflug: 50 zeitlose Gedichte, Martin Greif 2017, ISBN 978-3-943910-78-0.
- Abendstille: 50 zeitlose Gedichte, Frieda Jung 2017, ISBN 978-3-943910-84-1.
- Bachgeleite: 50 zeitlose Gedichte, Karl Mayer 2017, ISBN 978-3-943910-93-3.
- Himmelsnähe: 50 zeitlose Gedichte, Conrad Ferdinand Meyer 2017, ISBN 978-3-943910-95-7.
- Glockenklang: 50 zeitlose Gedichte, Wilhelm Raabe 2017, ISBN 978-3-943910-87-2.
- Weltherbst: 50 zeitlose Gedichte, Siegbert Stehmann 2017, ISBN 978-3-943910-88-9.
- Streikbrecher: 50 zeitlose Gedichte, Paul Zech 2017, ISBN 978-3-943910-91-9.
- Herbstbild: 50 zeitlose Gedichte, Johanna Ambrosius ISBN 978-3-943910-76-6.
- Sommermorgen: 50 zeitlose Gedichte, Marie von Ebner-Eschenbach 2017, ISBN 978-3-943910-79-7.
- Waldeinsamkeit: 50 zeitlose Gedichte, Heinrich Heine 2017, ISBN 978-3-943910-81-0.
- Perlenfischer: 50 zeitlose Gedichte, Carl Sternheim 2017, ISBN 978-3-943910-89-6.
- Morgane: 50 zeitlose Gedichte, Theodor Storm 2017, ISBN 978-3-943910-90-2.
- Traumgewölk: 50 zeitlose Gedichte, Albin Zollinger 2017, ISBN 978-3-943910-92-6.
- Heimatklänge: 50 zeitlose Gedichte, Stine Andresen 2018, ISBN 978-3-943910-94-0.
- Herbstpark: 50 zeitlose Gedichte, Paul Boldt 2018, ISBN 978-3-96175-009-2.
- Eiskönigin: 50 zeitlose Gedichte, Max Bruns 2018, ISBN 978-3-96175-011-5.
- Bergschloß: 50 zeitlose Gedichte, Johann Wolfgang Goethe 2018, ISBN 978-3-96175-040-5.
- Geistergruß: 50 zeitlose Gedichte, Gottfried Keller 2018, ISBN 978-3-96175-040-5.
- Waldsage: 50 zeitlose Gedichte, Karl Ernst Knodt 2018, ISBN 978-3-96175-060-3.
- Sinnenrausch: 50 zeitlose Gedichte, Else Lasker-Schüler 2018, ISBN 978-3-96175-067-2.
- Abendgang: 50 zeitlose Gedichte, Detlev von Liliencron 2018, ISBN 978-3-96175-071-9.
- Traumburg: 50 zeitlose Gedichte, Oskar Loerke 2018, ISBN 978-3-96175-073-3.
- Götterwink: 50 zeitlose Gedichte, Eduard Mörike 2018, ISBN 978-3-96175-079-5.
- Vorfrühling: 50 zeitlose Gedichte, Rainer Maria Rilke 2018, ISBN 978-3-96175-085-6.
- Welträtsel: 50 zeitlose Gedichte, Georg Ruseler 2018, ISBN 978-3-943910-97-1.
- Schöpfung: 50 zeitlose Gedichte, Hans Schiebelhuth 2018, ISBN 978-3-943910-96-4.
- Bergnebel: 50 zeitlose Gedichte, Gustav Schüler 2018, ISBN 978-3-96175-099-3.
- Herbstnebel: 50 zeitlose Gedichte, Wilhelmine Gräfin Wickenburg-Almásy 2018, ISBN 978-3-96175-116-7.
- Abendlied: 50 zeitlose Gedichte, Otto Julius Bierbaum 2018, ISBN 978-3-96175-007-8.
- Zauberblick: 50 zeitlose Gedichte, Joseph von Eichendorff 2018, ISBN 978-3-96175-025-2.
- Aufblick: 50 zeitlose Gedichte, Anton Wildgans 2019, ISBN 978-3-96175-117-4.
- Dünenhaus: 50 zeitlose Gedichte, Stefan George 2019, ISBN 978-3-96175-039-9.
- Weihestunde: 50 zeitlose Gedichte, Carl Spitteler 2019, ISBN 978-3-96175-102-0.
- Nebelbild: 50 zeitlose Gedichte, Paul Heyse 2019, ISBN 978-3-96175-052-8.
- Wanderlied: 50 zeitlose Gedichte, Rudolf Baumbach 2019, ISBN 978-3-96175-005-4.
- Waldasyl: 50 zeitlose Gedichte, Robert Hamerling 2019, ISBN 978-3-96175-123-5.
- Heidenglaube: 50 zeitlose Gedichte, Edgar Kurz 2019, ISBN 978-3-96175-122-8.
- Weltseele: 50 zeitlose Gedichte, Adolf Vögtlin 2019, ISBN 978-3-96175-112-9.

=== Contemporary fiction (selection) ===
- Junge Lyrik – 50 Dichterinnen und Dichter 1999, ISBN 3-9806390-1-0. (Co-author) Also second, revised edition 2000
- Junge Lyrik II – 50 Dichterinnen und Dichter 2000, ISBN 3-9806390-0-2.
- Junge Lyrik III – 50 Dichterinnen und Dichter 2002, ISBN 3-9806390-3-7. (Co-author) Also second, revised edition
- Die Jahreszeiten der Liebe – 36 Dichterinnen und Dichter 2006, ISBN 3-9806390-4-5. (Co-author)
- Zauberwelten: 100 Gedichte, Meinolf Finke, 2014, ISBN 978-3-943910-03-2.
- Quintessenz: 100 Gedichte, Thorsten Libotte, 2014, ISBN 978-3-943910-00-1.
- Mitbürger: 100 Gedichte, Thorsten Libotte 2014, ISBN 978-3-943910-01-8.
- Mitschrift: 100 Gedichte, Thomas Wensing, 2014, ISBN 978-3-943910-06-3.
- Anthrophobia: 100 Gedichte, Werner Moskopp 2014, ISBN 978-3-943910-09-4.
- Gesterntränen: 100 Gedichte, Tobias Seitz 2014, ISBN 978-3-943910-12-4.
- Krsna-Bewusstsein: Aphorismen, Werner Moskopp 2015, ISBN 978-3-943910-10-0.
- Sozialisolation: 100 Gedichte, Frank Findeiß, 2015, ISBN 978-3-943910-16-2.
- Zwischenspiel: Kurzgeschichten, Thomas Wensing 2015, ISBN 978-3-943910-07-0.
- Nebeltag: 100 Gedichte, Uwe Martens 2015, ISBN 978-3-943910-14-8.
- Zapping: 250 Gedichte, Thorsten Libotte 2015, ISBN 978-3-943910-02-5.
- Sonnenhonig: 100 Gedichte, Ann Catrin Apstein-Müller, 2015, ISBN 978-3-943910-20-9.
- Lichtgestöber: 100 Sonette, Meinolf Finke 2015, ISBN 978-3-943910-04-9.
- Großstadtsommer: 100 Gedichte, Christian Jahl 2015, ISBN 978-3-943910-13-1.
- Sternenstaub: 50 Gedichte, Thomas Bruns 2015, ISBN 978-3-943910-21-6.
- Blutonium: 100 Gedichte, Frank Findeiß 2016, ISBN 978-3-943910-22-3.
- Sandtropfen: 50 Gedichte, Vera Ludwig 2016, ISBN 978-3-943910-25-4.
- Herbstspaziergang: 100 Gedichte, Christian Brune-Sieren 2016, ISBN 978-3-943910-26-1.
- Degravitation: 50 Gedichte in Deutsch – 50 Poems in English, Ann Catrin Apstein-Müller 2016, ISBN 978-3-943910-23-0.
- Morgenröte: 100 Gedichte, Thomas Bruns 2016, ISBN 978-3-943910-32-2.
- Meditation: 50 Gedichte, Christof Schadt 2016, ISBN 978-3-943910-30-8.
- Feuertanz: 50 Gedichte, Cindy Vogel 2016, ISBN 978-3-943910-38-4.
- Zeitungsstand: 50 Gedichte, Christian Jahl 2016, ISBN 978-3-943910-28-5.
- Horizont: 100 Gedichte, Vera Ludwig 2016, ISBN 978-3-943910-31-5.
- Der letzte Tanz: Krimi-Kurzgeschichten, Renate Freund 2016, ISBN 978-3-943910-29-2.
- Wintersonne: 50 Sonette, Meinolf Finke 2016, ISBN 978-3-943910-34-6.
- Albtrauma: 50 Gedichte, Frank Findeiß 2017, ISBN 978-3-943910-43-8.
- Weltwelke: 50 Gedichte, Uwe Martens 2017, ISBN 978-3-943910-42-1.
- Himmelreich: 50 Sonette, Renate Freund 2017, ISBN 978-3-943910-65-0.
- Goldregenzeit: 50 Sonette, Meinolf Finke 2017, ISBN 978-3-943910-59-9.
- Sinnpuppe: 50 Gedichte, Renate Freund 2018, ISBN 978-3-943910-58-2.
- Marzipanhaut: 50 Gedichte, Evelyne A. Adenauer ISBN 978-3-943910-77-3.
- Glassymphonien: 50 Sonette, Renate Freund 2018, ISBN 978-3-943910-61-2.
- Kassiber: 50 Gedichte, Frank Findeiß 2018, ISBN 978-3-943910-62-9.
- Sonnenähren: 100 Sonette, Renate Freund 2018, ISBN 978-3-943910-64-3.
- Zauberbuch: 150 Gedichte, Thomas Bruns 2019, ISBN 978-3-943910-46-9.
- Lichthoffnung: 50 Sonette, Renate Freund 2019, ISBN 978-3-943910-49-0.
- Herbsttag: 50 Gedichte, Thomas Wensing, 2019, ISBN 978-3-943910-69-8.
- Winterruhe: 100 Gedichte, Renate Freund 2019, ISBN 978-3-943910-48-3.
- Alphasucht: 50 Gedichte, Frank Findeiß 2019, ISBN 978-3-943910-66-7.
- Dorfidylle: 250 Gedichte, Renate Freund 2019, ISBN 978-3-943910-47-6.
- Blütenlese: 250 Gedichte, Meinolf Finke, 2019, ISBN 978-3-943910-37-7.

== Literature (selection) ==
- Publishers' International ISBN Directory: 26th Edition of Publishers' International Directory with ISBN Index and the 20th Edition of the International ISBN Publishers' Directory. Geographical section: R-Z, Band 2, International ISBN Agency K. G. Saur Verlag, 1999, p. 654
- La construcción del "yo" femenino en la literatura, Biruté Ciplijauskaité, Universidad de Cádiz, Servicio de Publicaciones, 2004 – p. 437
- Not So Plain as Black and White: Afro-German Culture and History, 1890–2000, Patricia M. Mazón, Reinhild Steingröver (Editor), Boydell & Brewer, Patricia M. Mazón, Reinhild Steingröver – 2005 p. 231
- Stephan Koranyi (Editor): Gedichte zur Weihnacht, Reclam Verlag, 2009, p. 235, 241, 245
- Ina Nefzer (Editor): Gedichte wie Schmetterlinge, Thienemann Verlag, 2010, p. 124-127
- Wie viel Tod verträgt das Team?: Belastungs- und Schutzfaktoren in Hospizarbeit und Palliativmedizin, David Pfister, Monika Müller (Editors), Vandenhoeck & Ruprecht, 2014, p. 59
- Dietrich Bode (Editor): Italien. Eine Reise in Gedichten, Reclam Verlag, 2016, p. 125
- Annette Riedel, Anne-Christin Linde (Editors): Ethische Reflexion in der Pflege: Konzepte – Werte – Phänomene. Axel Springer SE, 2018, p. 134.
- Nicolai Riedel: Bibliographisches Handbuch der deutschsprachigen Lyrik 1945–2020. Metzler, 2023, p. 976
- Nicolai Riedel: Bibliographisches Handbuch deutschsprachiger Lyrik-Anthologien 1945–2024 Band 1. Metzler, Heidelberg 2025, (with Gudrun Wanek-Riedel), p. 375-376; 386; 412; 478.
- Nicolai Riedel: Bibliographisches Handbuch deutschsprachiger Lyrik-Anthologien 1945–2024 Band 2. Metzler, Heidelberg 2025, (with Gudrun Wanek-Riedel), p. 1148; 1187.
