= Thomas Bruns (poet) =

German writer and poet

- Born: 16 November 1976 (age 49); Greven, Germany
- Occupations: Writer and poet
- Years active: 2002–present
- Website: Official website of Thomas Bruns (in German)

Thomas Bruns (born 16 November 1976 in Greven) is a German writer and poet.

== Life and work ==
Thomas Bruns was born in 1976 in Greven in Westphalia. After finishing school with the Abitur at Gymnasium Augustinianum Greven and doing military service he started studying macroeconomics at University of Münster in 1997, after four semesters he changed his subject to politics, philosophy and comparative literature at the same university. After his studies, he travelled to India several times and also stayed there for longer periods.

Since the beginning of 2000, Thomas Bruns has published as an author in several anthologies of poetry, among others in the third volume of the series of Junge Lyrik published by Martin Werhand Verlag in 2002. In 2003 he participated together with six other authors, among them Florian Cieslik, Patric Hemgesberg and Martin Werhand, in a reading from the series Junge Lyrik organized by Thalia bookstore on World Book Day, 23 April in Münster. He also published some of his poems in the anthology Die Jahreszeiten der Liebe (The seasons of love). In November 2015 his first poetry book Sternenstaub (Stardust) was published in the series 50 Gedichte (50 poems) by Martin Werhand Verlag. His second book of poetry followed in September 2016, titled Morgenröte (Aurora) in the series 100 Gedichte (100 poems) by the same publisher. In December 2019 a third book of poetry followed titled Zauberbuch in the series 150 Gedichte (150 poems).

Today Thomas Bruns works as a freelance writer and lives in Münster.

== Publications (selection) ==
=== Books ===
- Sternenstaub. 50 Gedichte. Martin Werhand Verlag, Melsbach 2015, 100 p. ISBN 978-3-943910-21-6.
- Morgenröte. 100 Gedichte. Martin Werhand Verlag, Melsbach 2016, 154 p. ISBN 978-3-943910-04-9.
- Zauberbuch. 150 Gedichte. Martin Werhand Verlag, Melsbach 2019, 220 p. ISBN 978-3-943910-46-9.

=== Anthologies ===
- Junge Lyrik III – 50 Dichterinnen und Dichter. Anthology, Martin Werhand Verlag, Melsbach 2002, ISBN 3-9806390-3-7. Also second, revised edition.
- Die Jahreszeiten der Liebe. Anthology, Martin Werhand Verlag, Melsbach 2006, ISBN 3-9806390-4-5.

== Literature ==
- Thomas Bruns In: Deutsches Literatur-Lexikon. Das 20. Jahrhundert - Nachtragsband: A - E Volume 1, Verlag Walter de Gruyter, 2020, ISBN 978-3-11-063218-7
- Thomas Bruns In: Nicolai Riedel Bibliographisches Handbuch der deutschsprachigen Lyrik 1945–2020, Metzler, Heidelberg, 2023, S. 562, ISBN 978-3-662-65460-6
