= Martin Werhand Verlag =

German publishing house

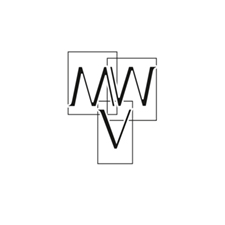
- Genre: Publishing house
- Founded: 1997
- Founder: Martin Werhand
- Headquarters: Melsbach, Rhineland-Palatinate (1997–present), Germany
- Products: books
- Website: martinwerhandverlag.de (in German)

The Martin Werhand Verlag is a German publishing house with a focus on contemporary literature and poetry. More than 25% of the 150 published authors have an immigrant background with parents who were born outside of Germany and have their roots in countries like the Netherlands, Greece, Spain, Croatia, Austria, Italy, Poland, Hungary, Latvia, Iran, Kazakhstan, Romania, Bulgaria, Turkey, Sri Lanka, South Korea, Russia or Uganda. Thus is also a mirror image of the German Society. The Martin Werhand publishing house stands for tolerance, integration and openness. It is located in Rhineland-Palatinate.

== Foundation ==
The Martin Werhand publishing house was founded in April 1997 by the German philologist, author and editor Martin Werhand. Martin is the son of Klaus Rudolf Werhand, a Neuwied-born blacksmith and art metal sculptor.

The beginning history of the publishing house started with the University of Bonn and University of Cologne, from where the first anthology of poetry Junge Lyrik took its beginning in 1999. From 1999 to 2002 the Martin Werhand publishing house has published three successful poetry volumes named Junge Lyrik, Junge Lyrik II and Junge Lyrik III, in each of which 750 poems were included from 50 young, previously unpublished authors. This was associated with a reading series where the authors recited their works in different towns in Germany like Essen, Bonn or Cologne. In 2003, the Thalia bookstore organized via its parent company Poertgen Herder in Münster on World Book Day on 23 April a reading with the anthology series Junge Lyrik. In 2006 the Bremer Straßenbahn AG under the direction of Dr. Joachim Tuz started a visual lyrical project called Poetry in Motion (Poesie bewegt) with many of the Martin Werhand publishing house authors with their contemporary poems.

In 2014, the Martin Werhand Verlag started a poetry series called 100 Gedichte. In 2016, the publishing house presented some new book series at Frankfurt Book Fair. like 50 zeitlose Gedichte or 50 Gedichte.

Renowned literary publishing houses such as Reclam Verlag or Thienemann Verlag engage in choosing their anthologies back on the authorship of the Martin Werhand publishing house in the recent past.

== Authors ==
Among the published authors are the Bulgarian-born author Angela Litschev (Förderpreis für Literatur der Landeshauptstadt Düsseldorf) 2005, the poet Patric Hemgesberg, musician and writer Christian Jahl, the Austrian-born theatre director and playwright Georgia Doll, the poet Meinolf Finke, the writer Renate Freund, the Spanish-born actor Mario Ramos who won the Hersfeld-Preis in 2005, the poet Vera Ludwig, the poet Thomas Bruns, the Haiku-writer Daniel Dölschner, poet and translator Ann Catrin Apstein-Müller, Daniela Frickel of the University of Cologne, the Slam Poetry artist Florian Cieslik, the writer Andrea Heuser (Wolfgang-Weyrauch-Förderpreis) 2007, the playwright Peter Wayand, Werner Moskopp of the University of Koblenz and Landau, the poet Thorsten Libotte, the writer Thomas Wensing, the poet Frank Findeiß and the journalist Simone Roßkamp who won the Axel-Springer-Preis in 2005.

== Publications (selection) ==
=== Classic fiction (selection) ===
- Traumfahrt: 50 zeitlose Gedichte, Achim von Akerman 2016, ISBN 978-3-943910-70-4.
- Graunebel: 50 zeitlose Gedichte, Max Geißler 2016, ISBN 978-3-943910-71-1.
- Totentanz: 50 zeitlose Gedichte, Franz Werfel 2016, ISBN 978-3-943910-72-8.
- Schneewinter: 50 zeitlose Gedichte, Stefan Zweig 2016, ISBN 978-3-943910-73-5.
- Grabgang: 50 zeitlose Gedichte, Frida Schanz 2016, ISBN 978-3-943910-74-2.
- Traumgesicht: 50 zeitlose Gedichte, Albrecht Haushofer 2016, ISBN 978-3-943910-75-9.
- Wegwarte: 50 zeitlose Gedichte, Isolde Kurz 2016, ISBN 978-3-943910-85-8.
- Tagesanbruch: 50 zeitlose Gedichte, Gustav Falke 2017, ISBN 978-3-943910-80-3.
- Geistesflug: 50 zeitlose Gedichte, Martin Greif 2017, ISBN 978-3-943910-78-0.
- Abendstille: 50 zeitlose Gedichte, Frieda Jung 2017, ISBN 978-3-943910-84-1.
- Bachgeleite: 50 zeitlose Gedichte, Karl Mayer 2017, ISBN 978-3-943910-93-3.
- Himmelsnähe: 50 zeitlose Gedichte, Conrad Ferdinand Meyer 2017, ISBN 978-3-943910-95-7.
- Glockenklang: 50 zeitlose Gedichte, Wilhelm Raabe 2017, ISBN 978-3-943910-87-2.
- Weltherbst: 50 zeitlose Gedichte, Siegbert Stehmann 2017, ISBN 978-3-943910-88-9.
- Streikbrecher: 50 zeitlose Gedichte, Paul Zech 2017, ISBN 978-3-943910-91-9.
- Herbstbild: 50 zeitlose Gedichte, Johanna Ambrosius ISBN 978-3-943910-76-6.
- Sommermorgen: 50 zeitlose Gedichte, Marie von Ebner-Eschenbach 2017, ISBN 978-3-943910-79-7.
- Waldeinsamkeit: 50 zeitlose Gedichte, Heinrich Heine 2017, ISBN 978-3-943910-81-0.
- Perlenfischer: 50 zeitlose Gedichte, Carl Sternheim 2017, ISBN 978-3-943910-89-6.
- Morgane: 50 zeitlose Gedichte, Theodor Storm 2017, ISBN 978-3-943910-90-2.
- Traumgewölk: 50 zeitlose Gedichte, Albin Zollinger 2017, ISBN 978-3-943910-92-6.
- Heimatklänge: 50 zeitlose Gedichte, Stine Andresen 2018, ISBN 978-3-943910-94-0.
- Herbstpark: 50 zeitlose Gedichte, Paul Boldt 2018, ISBN 978-3-96175-009-2.
- Eiskönigin: 50 zeitlose Gedichte, Max Bruns 2018, ISBN 978-3-96175-011-5.
- Bergschloß: 50 zeitlose Gedichte, Johann Wolfgang Goethe 2018, ISBN 978-3-96175-040-5.
- Geistergruß: 50 zeitlose Gedichte, Gottfried Keller 2018, ISBN 978-3-96175-040-5.
- Waldsage: 50 zeitlose Gedichte, Karl Ernst Knodt 2018, ISBN 978-3-96175-060-3.
- Sinnenrausch: 50 zeitlose Gedichte, Else Lasker-Schüler 2018, ISBN 978-3-96175-067-2.
- Abendgang: 50 zeitlose Gedichte, Detlev von Liliencron 2018, ISBN 978-3-96175-071-9.
- Traumburg: 50 zeitlose Gedichte, Oskar Loerke 2018, ISBN 978-3-96175-073-3.
- Götterwink: 50 zeitlose Gedichte, Eduard Mörike 2018, ISBN 978-3-96175-079-5.
- Vorfrühling: 50 zeitlose Gedichte, Rainer Maria Rilke 2018, ISBN 978-3-96175-085-6.
- Welträtsel: 50 zeitlose Gedichte, Georg Ruseler 2018, ISBN 978-3-943910-97-1.
- Schöpfung: 50 zeitlose Gedichte, Hans Schiebelhuth 2018, ISBN 978-3-943910-96-4.
- Bergnebel: 50 zeitlose Gedichte, Gustav Schüler 2018, ISBN 978-3-96175-099-3.
- Herbstnebel: 50 zeitlose Gedichte, Wilhelmine Gräfin Wickenburg-Almásy 2018, ISBN 978-3-96175-116-7.
- Abendlied: 50 zeitlose Gedichte, Otto Julius Bierbaum 2018, ISBN 978-3-96175-007-8.
- Zauberblick: 50 zeitlose Gedichte, Joseph von Eichendorff 2018, ISBN 978-3-96175-025-2.
- Aufblick: 50 zeitlose Gedichte, Anton Wildgans 2019, ISBN 978-3-96175-117-4.
- Dünenhaus: 50 zeitlose Gedichte, Stefan George 2019, ISBN 978-3-96175-039-9.
- Weihestunde: 50 zeitlose Gedichte, Carl Spitteler 2019, ISBN 978-3-96175-102-0.
- Nebelbild: 50 zeitlose Gedichte, Paul Heyse 2019, ISBN 978-3-96175-052-8.
- Wanderlied: 50 zeitlose Gedichte, Rudolf Baumbach 2019, ISBN 978-3-96175-005-4.
- Waldasyl: 50 zeitlose Gedichte, Robert Hamerling 2019, ISBN 978-3-96175-123-5.
- Heidenglaube: 50 zeitlose Gedichte, Edgar Kurz 2019, ISBN 978-3-96175-122-8.
- Weltseele: 50 zeitlose Gedichte, Adolf Vögtlin 2019, ISBN 978-3-96175-112-9.

=== Contemporary fiction (selection) ===
- Junge Lyrik – 50 Dichterinnen und Dichter 1999, ISBN 3-9806390-1-0. (Co-author) Also second, revised edition 2000
- Junge Lyrik II – 50 Dichterinnen und Dichter 2000, ISBN 3-9806390-0-2.
- Junge Lyrik III – 50 Dichterinnen und Dichter 2002, ISBN 3-9806390-3-7. (Co-author) Also second, revised edition
- Die Jahreszeiten der Liebe – 36 Dichterinnen und Dichter 2006, ISBN 3-9806390-4-5. (Co-author)
- Zauberwelten: 100 Gedichte, Meinolf Finke, 2014, ISBN 978-3-943910-03-2.
- Quintessenz: 100 Gedichte, Thorsten Libotte, 2014, ISBN 978-3-943910-00-1.
- Mitbürger: 100 Gedichte, Thorsten Libotte 2014, ISBN 978-3-943910-01-8.
- Mitschrift: 100 Gedichte, Thomas Wensing, 2014, ISBN 978-3-943910-06-3.
- Anthrophobia: 100 Gedichte, Werner Moskopp 2014, ISBN 978-3-943910-09-4.
- Gesterntränen: 100 Gedichte, Tobias Seitz 2014, ISBN 978-3-943910-12-4.
- Krsna-Bewusstsein: Aphorismen, Werner Moskopp 2015, ISBN 978-3-943910-10-0.
- Sozialisolation: 100 Gedichte, Frank Findeiß, 2015, ISBN 978-3-943910-16-2.
- Zwischenspiel: Kurzgeschichten, Thomas Wensing 2015, ISBN 978-3-943910-07-0.
- Nebeltag: 100 Gedichte, Uwe Martens 2015, ISBN 978-3-943910-14-8.
- Zapping: 250 Gedichte, Thorsten Libotte 2015, ISBN 978-3-943910-02-5.
- Sonnenhonig: 100 Gedichte, Ann Catrin Apstein-Müller, 2015, ISBN 978-3-943910-20-9.
- Lichtgestöber: 100 Sonette, Meinolf Finke 2015, ISBN 978-3-943910-04-9.
- Großstadtsommer: 100 Gedichte, Christian Jahl 2015, ISBN 978-3-943910-13-1.
- Sternenstaub: 50 Gedichte, Thomas Bruns 2015, ISBN 978-3-943910-21-6.
- Blutonium: 100 Gedichte, Frank Findeiß 2016, ISBN 978-3-943910-22-3.
- Sandtropfen: 50 Gedichte, Vera Ludwig 2016, ISBN 978-3-943910-25-4.
- Herbstspaziergang: 100 Gedichte, Christian Brune-Sieren 2016, ISBN 978-3-943910-26-1.
- Degravitation: 50 Gedichte in Deutsch - 50 Poems in English, Ann Catrin Apstein-Müller 2016, ISBN 978-3-943910-23-0.
- Morgenröte: 100 Gedichte, Thomas Bruns 2016, ISBN 978-3-943910-32-2.
- Meditation: 50 Gedichte, Christof Schadt 2016, ISBN 978-3-943910-30-8.
- Feuertanz: 50 Gedichte, Cindy Vogel 2016, ISBN 978-3-943910-38-4.
- Zeitungsstand: 50 Gedichte, Christian Jahl 2016, ISBN 978-3-943910-28-5.
- Horizont: 100 Gedichte, Vera Ludwig 2016, ISBN 978-3-943910-31-5.
- Der letzte Tanz: Krimi-Kurzgeschichten, Renate Freund 2016, ISBN 978-3-943910-29-2.
- Wintersonne: 50 Sonette, Meinolf Finke 2016, ISBN 978-3-943910-34-6.
- Albtrauma: 50 Gedichte, Frank Findeiß 2017, ISBN 978-3-943910-43-8.
- Weltwelke: 50 Gedichte, Uwe Martens 2017, ISBN 978-3-943910-42-1.
- Himmelreich: 50 Sonette, Renate Freund 2017, ISBN 978-3-943910-65-0.
- Goldregenzeit: 50 Sonette, Meinolf Finke 2017, ISBN 978-3-943910-59-9.
- Sinnpuppe: 50 Gedichte, Renate Freund 2018, ISBN 978-3-943910-58-2.
- Marzipanhaut: 50 Gedichte, Evelyne A. Adenauer ISBN 978-3-943910-77-3.
- Glassymphonien: 50 Sonette, Renate Freund 2018, ISBN 978-3-943910-61-2.
- Kassiber: 50 Gedichte, Frank Findeiß 2018, ISBN 978-3-943910-62-9.
- Sonnenähren: 100 Sonette, Renate Freund 2018, ISBN 978-3-943910-64-3.
- Zauberbuch: 150 Gedichte, Thomas Bruns 2019, ISBN 978-3-943910-46-9.
- Lichthoffnung: 50 Sonette, Renate Freund 2019, ISBN 978-3-943910-49-0.
- Herbsttag: 50 Gedichte, Thomas Wensing, 2019, ISBN 978-3-943910-69-8.
- Winterruhe: 100 Gedichte, Renate Freund 2019, ISBN 978-3-943910-48-3.
- Alphasucht: 50 Gedichte, Frank Findeiß 2019, ISBN 978-3-943910-66-7.
- Dorfidylle: 250 Gedichte, Renate Freund 2019, ISBN 978-3-943910-47-6.
- Blütenlese: 250 Gedichte, Meinolf Finke, 2019, ISBN 978-3-943910-37-7.
