= Vera Ludwig =

German poet (born 1978)

- Born: 5 May 1978 (age 48); Detmold, Germany
- Occupation: Poet
- Years active: 2000–present
- Website: Vera Ludwig in: NRW Literatur im Netz (in German)

Vera Ludwig (born 5 May 1978, in Detmold) is a German poet.

== Life and work ==
Vera Julia Ludwig was born in Detmold in North Rhine-Westphalia in 1978. After finishing school with the Abitur at Christian-Dietrich-Grabbe-Gymnasium in 1997 she studied special needs education at the University of Cologne to become a German teacher. In 2004 she started working as a student teacher at a special school in Gütersloh. From 2006 to 2008 she was a teacher at a special school, first in Beckum, later back at her first school in Gütersloh.

Besides working as a teacher she developed her talent as a writer, especially as a poet. She first published some of her poems in 2000 in the anthology Junge Lyrik II by Martin Werhand Verlag. From 1999 to 2002 Martin Werhand Verlag published 3 volumes of poetry, each with 750 poems of 50 young, yet unpublished authors. In connection with this some of the authors, among them Vera Ludwig, participated in a series of readings of their works at the University of Cologne. More poems by Vera Ludwig can be found in the anthology Junge Lyrik III from 2002. In March 2016 she published her first own book of poetry Sandtropfen (Drops of Sand) in the series 50 Gedichte (50 poems) by Martin Werhand Verlag, half a year later her second one with the title Horizont (Horizon) in the series 100 Gedichte (100 poems) by the same publisher. Vera Ludwig's poetry is characterized by a direct or metaphorical, psychologically motivated figurative language like the one of Erich Fried or Sarah Kirsch.

Vera Ludwig lives and works in Gütersloh.

== Publications (selection) ==
=== Books ===
- Sandtropfen. 50 Gedichte. Martin Werhand Verlag, Melsbach 2016, 100 p. ISBN 978-3-943910-25-4.
- Horizont. 100 Gedichte. Martin Werhand Verlag, Melsbach 2016, 152 p. ISBN 978-3-943910-31-5.

=== Anthologies ===
- Junge Lyrik II – 50 Dichterinnen und Dichter. Anthology, Martin Werhand Verlag, Melsbach 2000, ISBN 3-9806390-0-2.
- Junge Lyrik III – 50 Dichterinnen und Dichter. Anthology, Martin Werhand Verlag, Melsbach 2002, ISBN 3-9806390-3-7. Also second, revised edition.

== Literature ==
- Vera Ludwig In: Deutsches Literatur-Lexikon. Das 20. Jahrhundert Band 38: Loewe – Luttmer, Verlag Walter de Gruyter, 2022, ISBN 978-3-11-076095-8
- Vera Ludwig In: Nicolai Riedel Bibliographisches Handbuch der deutschsprachigen Lyrik 1945–2020, Metzler, Heidelberg, 2023, S. 781, ISBN 978-3-662-65460-6
