= Angela Litschev =

Bulgarian-German writer and poet

- Born: 17 July 1978 (age 47); Sofia, Bulgaria
- Occupations: Writer and poet
- Years active: 2000–present
- Website: Angela Litschev in: NRW Literatur im Netz (in German)

Angela Litschev (also known as Angela Litschewa, Bulgarian Ангела Личева; born 17 July 1978) is a Bulgarian-born German writer and poet.

== Life and career ==
Angela Litschev was born 1978 in Sofia as the only daughter of Alexander Litschev, a historian and philosophy lecturer and his wife Anna, a sociologist. The family emigrated to Germany in 1990, after her father had received a teaching position at the University of Düsseldorf. She attended Annette von Droste-Hülshoff-High School in Düsseldorf and then studied at St. Ursula's College of Social Work.

Litschev started her career by publishing her poems in poetry magazines and anthologies, including two volumes of the Young Poetry Series Junge Lyrik in the Martin Werhand Verlag in the years 2000 and 2003. The published poems were recited as part of a reading series by various authors in various German cities like Bonn, Cologne or Essen, among others in 2000 with a reading at the University of Cologne. Other poems were published in the Journal of Poetry, essays and criticism DAS GEDICHT, in the years 2003, 2007 and 2009.

In 2003, she received the Unicum prize for the best sonnet. In 2004, she published her debut collection of poems, eine rote minute, for which she received the Award of the Förderpreis für Literatur der Landeshauptstadt Düsseldorf in 2005. This ceremony brought her awareness beyond the borders of North Rhine-Westphalia and a reading in the Bulgarian Cultural Institute in Berlin in 2007. The year before, she had already published her second volume of poetry, rausch und täuschung. Several of her poems from this collection were translated into Croatian for the magazine Riječi, with an introduction by Ludwig Bauer.

In 2006, the Bremer Straßenbahn AG under the direction of Dr. Joachim Tuz started a visual lyrical project called Poetry In Motion (Poesie bewegt) with many modern authors and their contemporary poems, Angela Litschev among them.

In addition to readings, she reviews works by colleagues from the Düsseldorf area or supports Bulgarian writer colleagues. In 2009, she was involved in the translation of new Bulgarian poetry for the German literary magazine Akzente.

== Awards ==
- 2005: Förderpreis für Literatur der Landeshauptstadt Düsseldorf in Northrhine-Westphalia

== Selected publications ==
=== Books ===
- 2004: eine rote minute, mischwesen autorenverlag, München, 88 Seiten, ISBN 3-938313-04-8 (Foreword: Dato Barbakadse).
- 2006: rausch und täuschung, mischwesen autorenverlag, München, 66 Seiten, ISBN 3-938313-06-4.

=== Anthologies (selection) ===
- Junge Lyrik II, Martin Werhand Verlag, Melsbach 2000, ISBN 3-9806390-0-2
- Junge Lyrik III, Martin Werhand Verlag, Melsbach 2003, ISBN 3-9806390-3-7 Also second, revised edition. (edited by Martin Werhand)
- Power, dtv, Munich 2009, ISBN 978-3-423-13777-5
