= NRW Literatur im Netz =

German internet database

- Website type: Online database
- Available in: German
- Owner: Westfälisches Literaturbüro
- Editor: Westfälisches Literaturbüro
- Website: nrw-literatur-im-netz.de
- Commercial: No
- Registration: Optional
- Launched: 2001
- Current status: Active

NRW Literatur im Netz is a German internet database with short biographies of persons who have lived or worked in North Rhine-Westphalia. The Westphälische Literaturbüro (Westphalian office for literature) in Unna operates the biggest database for literary production in North Rhine-Westphalia, continuously updated since 2001. The database presents authors from NRW with detailed portraits as well as literary institutions and publishers.

== Content ==
Currently the database contains the bio-bibliographical data of more than 600 authors from North Rhine-Westphalia. It also offers text samples or press photographs, of the writers for download. Amongst other things, it allows searches for authors by region, genre, gender or in alphabetical order. In addition, the section Institutions offers information on publishers, libraries and literary institutions in North Rhine-Westphalia.

== Authors ==
Among the well-known writers whose literary profile is presented there are: Khalid al-Maaly, Jochen Arlt, Ingrid Bachér, Jürgen Becker, Marcel Beyer, Wolfgang Bittner, Hans Georg Bulla, Karl Otto Conrady, Sabine Deitmer, Renan Demirkan, Birgit Ebbert, Martin Ebbertz, Georg Feil, Frank Findeiß, Frank Goosen, Harald Gröhler, Gisbert Haefs, Ulla Hahn, Petra Hammesfahr, Elke Heidenreich, Guy Helminger, Ulrich Horstmann, Rudolf Jagusch, Renate Kampmann, Jürgen Kehrer, Hans Werner Kettenbach, Sabine Klewe, Peter Klusen, Herbert Knorr, Tim Krohn, Brigitte Kronauer, Wolfgang Kubin, Axel Kutsch, Annette Langen, Kurt Lehmkuhl, Thorsten Libotte, Andreas Mand, Erik Martin, Inge Meyer-Dietrich, Ingrid Noll, Hanns-Josef Ortheil, Emine Sevgi Özdamar, Ulrich Peltzer, Christoph Peters, Akif Pirinçci, Jutta Richter, Karl Riha, Ralf Rothmann, Frank Schätzing, Claudia Schreiber, Tilman Spengler, Ralf Thenior, Regula Venske, Antje Vowinckel, Günter Wallraff, Juli Zeh, Jan Zweyer.

== Criteria ==
To be added to the database, a person must have been born, died, had a significant influence or lived in the territory of what is today North Rhine-Westphalia. The person must have published at least one individual literary work. The conditions of admission of the Writers‘ Union apply. The entry in the NRW database is free of charge for authors and institutions.
