= Wensing =

Wensing is a surname. Notable people with the surname include:

- Luisa Wensing (born 1993), German footballer
- Thomas Wensing (born 1978), German poet and short story writer

== See also ==
- Wenning
