= Daniel Dölschner =

German poet and Haiku-writer

- Born: January 9, 1976 (age 50); Frankfurt am Main, West Germany
- Occupations: Poet and haiku-writer
- Years active: 2004–present
- Website: Website of Daniel Dölschner (in German)

Daniel Dölschner (born January 9, 1976, in Frankfurt am Main) is a German poet and Haiku-writer.

== Life and career ==
Daniel Dölschner was born in Frankfurt am Main in 1976. Growing up in Kronberg im Taunus, he studied for an eighteen-month stay in the state of Pennsylvania and a half years in Houston in the state of Texas, 1998–2003 American studies and philosophy at the Goethe University Frankfurt.

After his studies he worked as a freelance writer and Haiku poet. In 2004 his first Haiku book Die Hochhäuser im Rücken: Haiku und Senryu. The second book Neu gesehen: Haiku was published in the same year. In 2006, he was represented with his poetic texts in the love poetry anthology Die Jahreszeiten der Liebe in the Martin Werhand Verlag. In 2012 he was a haiku writer in addition to numerous other well-known German poets in the anthology Haiku hier und heute, 112 examples of German haiku poetry from the 21st century, published by Rainer Stolz and Udo Wenzel.

In 2006 the Bremer Straßenbahn AG under the direction of Dr. Joachim Tuz started a visual lyrical project called Poetry in Motion (Poesie bewegt) with many modern authors and their contemporary poems, Daniel Dölschner among them. In addition to the individual publications, Daniel Dölschners works appeared in various annual volumes, Quarterlies, Anthologies and Haiku journals.

Daniel Dölschner is a member of the German Haiku Society and works as freelance writer in Augsburg.

== Publications (selection) ==
=== Books ===
- Die Hochhäuser im Rücken: Haiku und Senryu. Minimart-Verlag, Frankfurt am Main, 2004, ISBN 3-933213-23-1.
- Neu gesehen: Haiku. Wiesenburg-Verlag, Schweinfurt, 2004, ISBN 3-937101-30-6.

=== Anthologies (selection) ===
- Haiku heute – Der Lärm des Herzens, Haiki Jahrbuch 2004, Edition Blaue Felder, Tübingen, April 2005, ISBN 3-936487-07-3, P. 11
- Vierteljahresschrift der Deutschen Haiku-Gesellschaft, 18. Volume, Band 70, October 2005, P. 28
- Die Jahreszeiten der Liebe. Anthology, Martin Werhand Verlag, Melsbach 2006, ISBN 3-9806390-4-5.
- Haiku hier und heute. Anthology, Deutscher Taschenbuch Verlag, Munich 2012, ISBN 978-3-423-14102-4.
