= Ann Catrin Apstein-Müller =

German poet and translator

- Born: 13 April 1973 (age 53); Gräfelfing, Germany
- Occupations: Poet and translator
- Years active: 2002–present
- Website: Wortstromer Übersetzung & Lektorat, Ann Catrin Bolton & Piers Bolton Official Website (in German)

Ann Catrin Apstein-Müller (also Ann Catrin Bolton; born 13 April 1973, Gräfelfing, near Munich) is a German poet and translator. She lives and works in Augsburg.

== Life and work ==
Ann grew up in a Munich suburb, where she finished school with the Abitur in 1992. After that she studied German literature and American literature and Media law at LMU Munich and trained as a Bookseller. After ten years of part-time work in a bookshop, which she used to build up her freelance business, she now works as a freelance translator and editor for literary and specialized texts. She started writing poems when she was still at elementary school; in her most intensive poetic period between 2000 and 2013 her poems were mainly based on her own life and observations combined with influences from music, film and literature.

Since 2005, she has worked mainly as a translator from Slovenian and English. She translated numerous works and plays by Slovenian authors into German. In November 2015, she published her first own poetry book titled Sonnenhonig (Sun honey) in the series 100 Gedichte (100 Poems) by publisher Martin Werhand Verlag. Her second poetry book, titled Degravitation, was published one year later by the same publisher. Apart from poems – the first were published in 2002 in the anthology series Junge Lyrik (Young Poetry) by Martin Werhand Verlag – she also published short prose, for example in the German literary magazine Dichtungsring.

== Published translations ==
=== Books ===
- Aleš Šteger, Preußenpark: Berliner Skizzen, Suhrkamp Verlag, Frankfurt a. M. 2009, ISBN 978-3-518-12569-4 (Orig.: Berlin, Beletrina 2007)
- Pero Simić, Tito – Geheimnis des Jahrhunderts, Orbis 2012, ISBN 978-961-6372-75-6 (Orig.: Tito – skrivnost stoletja, Orbis 2010)
- Tadej Golob, Der Goldene Zahn, Schruf&Stipetic, Berlin 2015, ISBN 978-3-944359-12-0 (Orig.: Zlati zob, Mladinska knjiga 2011)
- Evald Flisar, Der Zauberlehrling, Hermagoras, Klagenfurt 2015, ISBN 978-3-7086-0856-3 (Orig.: Čarovnikov vajenec, 9. izd., KUD Sodobnost International, 2013)
- Davorin Lenko, Körper im Dunkeln, DSP/Litterae Slovenicae; Ljubljana 2016, ISBN 978-961-6547-98-7 (Orig.: Telesa v temi, Center za slovensko književnost 2013)
- Miha Mazzini, Deutsche Lotterie, Transit Buchverlag 2016, ISBN 9783887473341 (Orig.: Nemška loterija, Beletrina 2010)
- Marko Sosič, Tito, amor mijo, Drava, Klagenfurt 2016, ISBN 978-3-85435-775-9 (i.V. Orig.: Tito, amor mijo, Litera 2005)
- Evald Flisar, Über den Wolken, Klagenfurt 2017, ISBN 978-3-7086-0932-4 (i. V. Orig.: Besede nad oblaki)
- Anita Šumer, Verrückt nach Sauerteig, Unimedica, Kandern, 2019 ISBN 978-3-96257-104-7 (i. V. Orig.: Drožomanija)
- Jana Bauer, Die kleine Gruselfee, Frankfurt am Main 2019, ISBN 978-3-7373-5636-7 (i. V. Orig.: Groznovilca v Hudi hosti)
- Maja Gal Štromar, Denk an mich, auch in guten Zeiten, Bad Herrenalb, 2020, ISBN 978-3-9819763-8-0 (i. V. Orig.: Misli name, ko ti je lepo)
- Veronika Dintinjana, Gelb brennt der Forsythienstrauch, Ljubljana, 2020, ISBN 978-961-6995-62-7 (i. V. Orig.: Rumeno gori grm forzici)

=== Plays ===
- Simona Semenič, 5jungs.net, Kaiserverlag, Wien 2009
- Simona Semenič, Sie da, sehen Sie uns (denn) wirklich nie oder (tun Sie s) etwa doch?, Volkstheater Wien 2010
- Evald Flisar, Und Leonardo?, Theater im Keller, Graz, DEA Oktober 2012

=== Articles in books and magazines ===
- Aleš Šteger, Tacitus in der U-Bahn-Station, in: Sprache im technischen Zeitalter 183, Köln 2007
- Aleš Šteger, Erbarmen! Erbarmen! Herr Professor, verstehen Sie das Leben?, in: Osteuropa 2-3/2009, Berlin 2009
- Aleš Šteger, Die Erschaffung der verlorenen Zeit, in: Branko Lenart, Styrians, Kultur in Leibnitz, Leibnitz 2009
- Aleš Šteger, Wozu?, in: Josef Trattner, Sofa, Schlebrügge.Editor, Wien 2010
- Milan Kleč, Schieler, in: Ostragehege 59, Dresden 2010
- Stanka Hrastelj, 9 Gedichte für das Projekt European Borderlands des LCB, 2010
- Aleš Šteger, Gegen die Phantome, Vortrag Europäische Literaturtage 2010, Wachau, Österreich
- Ana Pepelnik, 11 Gedichte für lyrikline.org
- Tadej Golob, Schweinsfüße (Auszug), Slovene Studies 34/1-2, Bowling Green 2012

== Own works ==
=== Books ===
- 2015: Sonnenhonig: 100 Gedichte, Martin Werhand Verlag, Melsbach, ISBN 978-3-943910-20-9
- 2016: Degravitation: 50 Gedichte in Deutsch - 50 Poems in English, Martin Werhand Verlag, Melsbach, ISBN 978-3-943910-23-0 (Also second, revised edition)

=== Own articles in literature and professional magazines ===
- 2002: Gedichte in: Junge Lyrik III, Martin Werhand Verlag, ISBN 3-9806390-3-7
- 2003: Notamerica (Kurzprosa) in: Torso 12, Berlin/München
- 2008: e = mc² (Kurzprosa) in: Dichtungsring, Nr. 36, Bonn
- 2009: "Wieder vereint/Reunited" (Kurzprosa) in: The Vanderbilt Berlin Wall Project, ed. Beatrix Brockman, Nashville /Tennessee, ISBN 978-0-557-10819-0
- 2009: Gedichte in: anthologie blauer salon – eins, glauche-löwe-milserliteraturprojekte gbr, Duisburg, ISBN 978-3-9813131-0-9

== Literature ==
- Ann Catrin Apstein-Müller In: Deutsches Literatur-Lexikon. Das 20. Jahrhundert - Nachtragsband: A - E Volume 1, Verlag Walter de Gruyter, 2020; ISBN 978-3-11-063218-7
- Ann Catrin Apstein-Müller In: Nicolai Riedel Bibliographisches Handbuch der deutschsprachigen Lyrik 1945–2020, Metzler, Heidelberg, 2023, S. 514; ISBN 978-3-662-65460-6
