= Uwe Martens =

German writer and poet

- Born: 3 February 1970 (age 56); Cologne, Germany
- Occupations: Writer and poet
- Years active: 2002–present
- Website: Website of Uwe Martens (in German)

Uwe Martens (born 3 February 1970 in Cologne) is a German writer and poet.

== Life and work ==
Uwe Martens was born in Cologne in 1970. After graduating from high school at the Städtisches Gymnasium Cologne-Pesch and the subsequent civil service in a Cologne retirement home, he began studying law at the University of Cologne, but after three semesters in 1992 he switched to an apprenticeship in the book trade in Cologne-Ehrenfeld, which he completed in 1995. He then lived for three years in Detmold, East Westphalia. At the beginning of 1999 he returned to Cologne, where he lived until 2011. During this period he worked in a bookstore in Bonn. In 2011 he moved to the edge of the Alps for work. There he was in charge of the paperback department in a bookstore in Garmisch-Partenkirchen until 2016.

Since the beginning of the 2000s, Uwe Martens has been represented as an author with publications in various poetry anthologies, including 2002 in the Martin Werhand Verlag in the third volume of the anthology series Junge Lyrik. In 2015, his first own volume of poetry, Nebeltag, was published in the 100 poems series by Martin Werhand Verlag. His second poetry publication followed in September 2017 under the title Weltwelke in the series 50 poems by the same publisher. In December 2018, the MWV published a third volume by Martens under the title Light Sketches in the series 150 poems.

Today Uwe Martens lives and works as a freelance writer in Cologne.

== Publications (selection) ==
=== Books ===
- Nebeltag. 100 Gedichte. Martin Werhand Verlag, Melsbach 2015, 164 p. ISBN 978-3-943910-14-8.
- Weltwelke. 50 Gedichte. Martin Werhand Verlag, Melsbach 2017, 120 p. ISBN 978-3-943910-42-1.
- Lichtskizzen. 150 Gedichte. Martin Werhand Verlag, Melsbach 2018, 220 p. ISBN 978-3-943910-63-6.

=== Anthologies ===
- Junge Lyrik III – 50 Dichterinnen und Dichter. Anthology, Martin Werhand Verlag, Melsbach 2002, ISBN 3-9806390-3-7. Also second, revised edition.

== Literature ==
- Uwe Martens In: Deutsches Literatur-Lexikon. Das 20. Jahrhundert Band 40: Mansion - Mehl, Verlag Walter de Gruyter, 2023, ISBN 978-3-11-100542-3
- Uwe Martens In: Nicolai Riedel Bibliographisches Handbuch der deutschsprachigen Lyrik 1945–2020, Metzler, Heidelberg, 2023, S. 790, ISBN 978-3-662-65460-6
