= Thomas Wensing =

German writer (born 1978)

- Born: 1 May 1978 (age 48); Cologne, West Germany
- Occupations: Writer and poet
- Years active: 1999–present
- Website: Official website of Thomas Wensing (in German)

Thomas Wensing (born 1 May 1978 in Cologne) is a German author of poetry and short stories.

== Life and works ==
Thomas Wensing, born 1978 in Cologne (North Rhine-Westphalia) has studied at the University of Cologne and at the Catholic University of Eichstätt-Ingolstadt. He obtained his PhD from the latter institution in 2011.

Besides studies and occupation, Wensing developed skills in writing literary texts. Since the late 1990s, he has been publishing poetry in a couple of anthologies, e.g. in Junge Lyrik, Junge Lyrik II and Junge Lyrik III, a book series published by Martin Werhand Verlag. In 2006, he participated in the visual-poetric project Poesie bewegt of the Bremer Straßenbahn AG under supervision of Joachim Tuz. Together with the two musicians Martin Schmitz and Michael Wurzel, Wensing formed the trio eher selten that performed poetry and music at various occasions in the mid-2000s. Apart from that group, he tried out his texts in several other formats, e.g. in cooperation with the Stadttheater Ingolstadt.

In August 2014 Martin Werhand Verlag published Wensings first own volume of poems (Mitschrift), within the series 100 Gedichte. A volume of short stories (Zwischenspiel) appeared in late 2015 in the same publishing house. In December 2019 the MWV published a third book with poems (Herbsttag), within the series 50 Gedichte.

== Selected publications ==
=== Monographies ===
- Periodic Review Inventory Systems. Performance Analysis and Optimization of Inventory Systems within Supply Chains. Springer, Berlin 2011, 152 p. ISBN 978-3-642-20479-1.
- Mitschrift. 100 Gedichte. Martin Werhand Verlag, Melsbach 2014, 190 p. ISBN 978-3-943910-06-3.
- Zwischenspiel. Kurzgeschichten. Martin Werhand Verlag, Melsbach 2015, 258 p. ISBN 978-3-943910-07-0.
- Herbsttag. 50 Gedichte. Martin Werhand Verlag, Melsbach 2019, 120 p. ISBN 978-3-943910-69-8.

=== Anthologies ===
- Junge Lyrik – 50 Dichterinnen und Dichter. Anthology, Martin Werhand Verlag, Melsbach 1999, ISBN 3-9806390-1-0.
- Junge Lyrik II – 50 Dichterinnen und Dichter. Anthology, Martin Werhand Verlag, Melsbach 2000, ISBN 3-9806390-0-2.
- Junge Lyrik III – 50 Dichterinnen und Dichter. Anthology, Martin Werhand Verlag, Melsbach 2002, ISBN 3-9806390-3-7. Also second, revised edition.

== Literature (selection) ==
- Thomas Wensing in: Frank-Uwe Orbons: Die Gedanken gingen auf Wanderschaft, Kölner Stadt-Anzeiger, 12. April 2005
- Thomas Wensing in: Melanie Nicolai: Gute Unterhaltung ist ihnen wichtig, Kölner Stadt-Anzeiger, 21. February 2006
- Thomas Wensing in: Raffinierte Lyrik und experimentelle Performance, Donaukurier, 2. April 2006
- Thomas Wensing in: Tradition und Moderne, Donaukurier, 18. April 2010
- Thomas Wensing in: Aus der Zeitlosigkeit des Kellers, Donaukurier, 15. June 2010
- Thomas Wensing In: Nicolai Riedel Bibliographisches Handbuch der deutschsprachigen Lyrik 1945–2020, Metzler, Heidelberg, 2023, S. 976, ISBN 978-3-662-65460-6
