= Patric Hemgesberg =

German poet (born 1973)

- Born: 3 November 1973 (age 52); Brühl, North Rhine-Westphalia, West Germany
- Occupation: Poet
- Years active: 2000–present
- Website: Official website of Patric Hemgesberg (in German)

Patric Hemgesberg (born 3 November 1973) is a German poet.

== Life and career ==
Patric Hemgesberg was born in 1973 in Brühl. After a brief study of social education he has worked since 2001 as a home educator in a home for disabled people in Bonn. In addition to the normal jobs, he also developed a talent in the writing guild. Since early 2000 he is represented as a lyricist with various publications in numerous poetry anthologies, including the Heyne Verlag in the anthology Weißt Du noch das Zauberwort, published by Kristiane Allert-Wybranietz, 2002 in the Young Poetry series Junge Lyrik in the Martin Werhand Verlag or edited by Axel Kutsch in the Poetry anthology Zeit. Wort: Deutschsprachige Lyrik der Gegenwart.

More publications can be found in particular in poetry magazines like Die Brücke - Forum für antirassistische Politik und Kultur, or Federwelt. Furthermore, he is represented with his poems in various poetry anthologies of the Cologne Ferber publisher.

In 2003, the poetry book Tor zur Hölle: bitte leise schließen; Gedichte um einen verrückten Planeten was published.

Patric Hemgesberg has numerous readings in North Rhine-Westphalia, organized with his poems in the Bonn-Cologne area. In 2003, the Thalia bookstore organized via its parent company Poertgen Herder in Münster on World Book Day on 23 April a reading with the anthology series Junge Lyrik.

Patric Hemgesberg is father of two sons and lives with his family in Bornheim.

== Publications (selection) ==
=== Books ===
- Tor zur Hölle: bitte leise schließen; Gedichte um einen verrückten Planeten. Lyrik, Ferber Verlag, Cologne 2003, ISBN 978-3-931918-40-8.

=== Anthologies (selection) ===
- Weißt Du noch das Zauberwort. Anthology, Heyne Verlag, Munich 2000, ISBN 3-4531731-8-X.
- Junge Lyrik III - 50 Dichterinnen und Dichter. Anthology, Martin Werhand Verlag, Melsbach 2002, ISBN 3-9806390-3-7. Also second, revised edition. (edited by Martin Werhand)
- Rot trifft Blau. Anthologie, Ferber-Verlag, Cologne, 2002, ISBN 3-931918-07-6.
- Ein leises Du. Anthology, Geest-Verlag, Vechta, 2003, ISBN 3-4531731-8-X.
- Schreiben. Ich schreibe, weil... Anthology, Ferber-Verlag, Cologne, 2003, ISBN 3-931918-08-4.
- Zeit. Wort: Deutschsprachige Lyrik der Gegenwart. Anthology, Landpresse, Weilerswist, 2003, ISBN 3-935221-21-5.
- 11. September 2001 - eine literarische Retrospektive. Anthology, Verlagshaus Monsenstein und Vannerdat, 2003, ISBN 3-937312-07-2.
- Einmal ist keinmal - CalVino Rosso. Anthology, Ferber-Verlag, Cologne, 2004, ISBN 3-931918-12-2.

== Literature ==
- Patric Hemgesberg in: Deutsches Literatur-Lexikon. Das 20. Jahrhundert Band 16: Heinemann - Herrmann, Walter de Gruyter, 2011, Seite 396
