= Thorsten Libotte =

German writer and poet (born 1972)

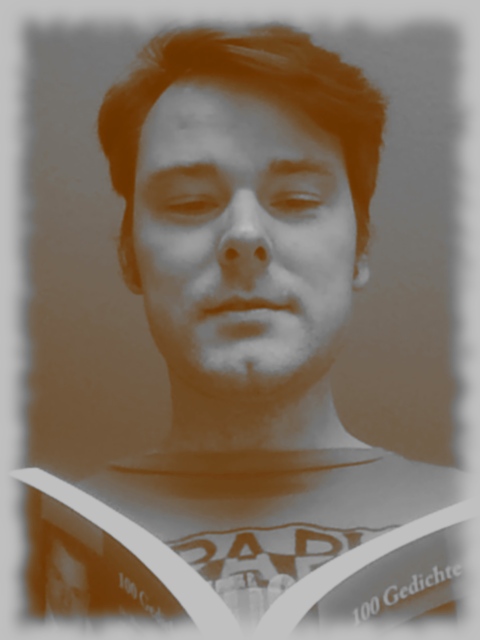
- Self-portrait photograph
- Born: 20 July 1972 (age 54); Bonn, West Germany
- Occupations: Writer and poet
- Years active: 1999–present
- Website: Official website of Thorsten Libotte (in German)

Thorsten Libotte (born 20 July 1972 in Bonn) is a German writer and poet.

== Life and career ==
Thorsten Libotte was born 1972 in Bonn (North Rhine-Westphalia). After graduating from high school and subsequent military duty he began his biology studies at the Rheinische Friedrich-Wilhelms-Universität Bonn in the fall of 1992. In the spring of 2001 he moved to the University of Cologne to research as a doctoral fellow at the Faculty of Medicine and received his PhD in the summer of 2004.

In addition to normal studies and professional activities, he developed his talent as a writer. Since the late 1990s, he is represented as a poet with various publications in numerous poetry anthologies, including three volumes of the Young Poetry Series Junge Lyrik at the Martin Werhand Verlag. Furthermore, he contributed to the classic series Gedichte zur Weihnacht at the Reclam Verlag publishing house under supervision of editor Stephan Koranyi.

In 2006 the Bremer Straßenbahn AG under the direction of Dr. Joachim Tuz started a visual lyrical project called Poetry in Motion (Poesie bewegt) with many modern authors and their contemporary poems, Thorsten Libotte among them.

In March 2014 his own first book of poetry Quintessenz appeared in the series 100 Gedichte at Martin Werhand Verlag. His second poetry book was published in the same year under the name Mitbürger. His third book of poems Zapping appeared in the series 250 Gedichte and was published at Martin Werhand Verlag in November 2015.

Thorsten Libotte is father of two kids and lives with his family in Ruppichteroth.

== Publications (selection) ==
=== Books ===
- Quintessenz. 100 Gedichte. Martin Werhand Verlag, Melsbach 2014, 136 p. ISBN 978-3-943910-00-1.
- Mitbürger. 100 Gedichte. Martin Werhand Verlag, Melsbach 2014, 136 p. ISBN 978-3-943910-01-8.
- Zapping. 250 Gedichte. Martin Werhand Verlag, Melsbach 2015, 294 p. ISBN 978-3-943910-02-5.

=== Anthologies (selection) ===
- Junge Lyrik – 50 Dichterinnen und Dichter. Anthology, Martin Werhand Verlag, Melsbach 1999, ISBN 3-9806390-1-0.
- Junge Lyrik II – 50 Dichterinnen und Dichter. Anthology, Martin Werhand Verlag, Melsbach 2000, ISBN 3-9806390-0-2.
- Junge Lyrik III – 50 Dichterinnen und Dichter. Anthology, Martin Werhand Verlag, Melsbach 2002, ISBN 3-9806390-3-7. Also second, revised edition.
- Die Jahreszeiten der Liebe. Anthology, Martin Werhand Verlag, Melsbach 2006, ISBN 3-9806390-4-5.
- Gedichte zur Weihnacht. Anthology, Reclam Verlag, Ditzingen 2009, ISBN 978-3-15-010719-5.
- Gedanken wie Schmetterlinge. Anthology, Thienemann Verlag, Stuttgart 2010, ISBN 978-3-522-50193-4.

== Literatur ==
- Thorsten Libotte In: Deutsches Literatur-Lexikon. Das 20. Jahrhundert Band 36: Lehmann – Lichtenberg, Verlag Walter de Gruyter, 2021, ISBN 978-3-11-070506-5
- Thorsten Libotte In: Nicolai Riedel Bibliographisches Handbuch der deutschsprachigen Lyrik 1945–2020, Metzler, Heidelberg, 2023, S. 772, ISBN 978-3-662-65460-6
