= Georgia Doll =

- Born: July 2, 1980 (age 46); Vienna, Austria
- Occupations: Austrian-born German Theatre director, playwright and poet
- Years active: 2002–present
- Website: Georgia Doll at Maxim Gorki Theater (in German)

Georgia Doll (born July 2, 1980 in Vienna) is an Austrian-born German theatre director, playwright and poet.

== Life and career ==
Georgia Doll was born on July 2, 1980, in Vienna. At the age of eight years her parents left Austria and moved to Hamburg. After graduation and her literature and theater studies at the University of Hamburg, she left Hamburg and studied theater in Toulouse, theater directing in Paris and playwriting in Berlin.

In 2006, her piece Le Pays Sombre is played at the Théatre Ouvert in Paris. Her other plays Miss Europa fährt nach Afrika, Der Hang zum Grundsätzlichen, Der König hat Hunger, Lorenzos Rückkehr, Das blaue Gold, Stranger as well as short pieces were played in France, Germany and Austria, in particular in the cities of Cannes, Marseille, Montluçon, Graz, Vienna, Düsseldorf, Hamburg, at the Staatsschauspiel Dresden, the Munich Kammerspiele and the Maxim Gorki Theatre in Berlin.

In 2006, she also staged Miss Europa fährt nach Afrika in Paris, in 2007 she founded the youth theater troupe "Anyigba Yéyé" in Amlame, Togo, with whom she developed Visite sur Terre and 2008 the Bertolt Brecht play Die Ausnahme und die Regel (2009 on Goethe Institute Lomé) and in 2013 she directed Das blaue Gold in Toulouse. In 2011, Georgia Doll was nominated for the Munich Prize for German language and drama.

Together with director Ida Clay in 2012 she co-directed the short film Der Vogel und die Fenster. In 2013, she worked together with the actor and director Philip Baumgarten in an artist residency at the Marelle villa des Auteurs in the Friche de la Belle de Mai in Marseille for their production Sous le sixieme soleil, that has been sent in April of the same year in the Radio Grenouille in Marseille.

As part of the author inside workshop out - new German pieces -, a cooperation of cultural and lifestyle publication freitext, Ballhaus Naunynstraße and the Ensemble of the Maxim Gorki Theatrein Berlin, her play ich waren wir wir waren ich was shown at the studio Я of the Maxim Gorki Theatre and in the Ballhaus Naunynstraße.

Since 2012, she works in Marseille with her company Les Passagers du Mardi.

Georgia Doll writes both in German and in French. In 2002, she published lyrical texts in the series Junge Lyrik in the Martin Werhand Verlag. In 2010, she was published in the anthology Zwischenspiele: Neue Texte, Wahrnehmungs- und Fiktionsräume in Theater, Tanz und Performance in the transcript Verlag. In 2013, she published her bilingual play Das blaue Gold: L'or bleu in the Drei Masken Verlag.

== Awards ==
- 2011: Nomination for the Münchner Förderpreis für deutsche Sprache und Dramatik

== Publications (selection) ==
=== Books ===
- Das blaue Gold: L'or bleu, Drei Masken Verlag, Toulouse: Presses Univ. du Mirailm, 2013, ISBN 978-2-8107-0249-7

=== Anthologies (selection) ===
- Junge Lyrik III - 50 Dichterinnen und Dichter. Anthology, Martin Werhand Verlag, Melsbach 2002, ISBN 3-9806390-3-7. Also second, revised edition. (edited by Martin Werhand)
- Zwischenspiele: Neue Texte, Wahrnehmungs- und Fiktionsräume in Theater, Tanz und Performance. Anthology, transcript Verlag, Bielefeld, 2010, ISBN 978-3-8376-1015-4

== Literature ==
- Georgia Doll. In: - Das blaue Gold: L'or bleu, Drei Masken Verlag, 2013 ISBN 978-2-8107-0249-7
