= Allert =

Allert (also sometimes Allaert, Allerts, Allertz, or Allertsz), is both a surname and a given name. Notable people with the name include:

== Surname ==
- Märta Allertz (1628 – before 1677), A.K.A. Brita Allerts, the royal mistress of Charles X of Sweden.
- Ejler Allert (1881–1959), a Danish rower who competed in the 1912 Summer Olympics.
- Gerd Allert (1940–2010), Swedish textile artist
- Rick Allert, Australian businessman
- Kristiane Allert-Wybranietz (1955–2017), German writer and poet.
- Ty Allert (born 1963), former Texas Longhorns and NFL American football player.
- Horace Allert, former American football player in the NFL, then American football coach at Northbrook High School in Houston, Texas, from 1974 to 1979.
- Frank Allert, A.K.A. Capital Q, co-founder of Dream Warriors, a Canadian hip hop duo from Toronto, Ontario, in 1988.

== Given name ==
- Allert Pieter Allertsz, mayor of Amsterdam in 1426
- Allert Jacob Bijlensz, mayor of Amsterdam in 1427
- Allert Olson (1896–1976), American politician in Iowa
- Allaert van Everdingen (1621–1675), a Dutch Golden Age painter and printmaker
