= Christian Jahl =

German musician, writer, and songwriter (born 1972)

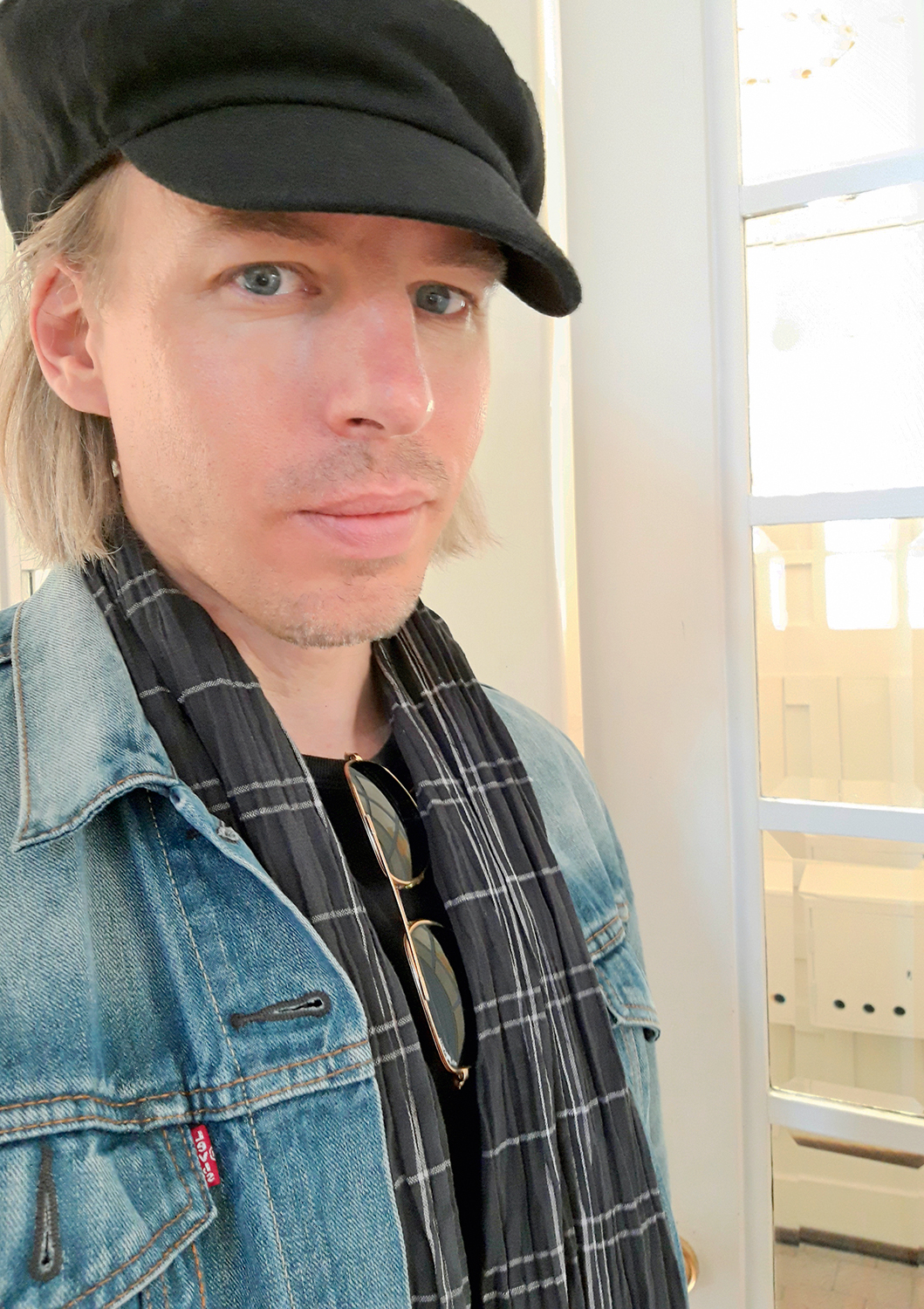
- Born: 8 December 1972 (age 53); Düsseldorf, Germany
- Occupations: Musician, writer and poet
- Years active: 1995–present
- Website: Official website of Christian Jahl (in German)

Christian Jahl (born 8 December 1972 in Düsseldorf) is a German musician, writer, and songwriter.

== Life and career ==
During his studies at University of Cologne, where he graduated as a Master of Arts in musicology, Christian Jahl published his first poems in 1999 at Martin Werhand Verlag in the poetry anthology entitled Junge Lyrik. The following publication was a historical photo book about the city of Meerbusch in 2002, where he went to grammar school at Städtisches Meerbusch-Gymnasium. In 2003 he wrote a musicological analysis of the music of the British musician Sting entitled Sting – Die Musik eines Rockstars which was published in Germany.

The guitarist or keyboardist Christian Jahl worked live and as a studio musician in many different projects with artists like David Graham, Thomas Battenstein or singer and actress Isabell Classen amongst others. He also wrote and produced music for trailers and different media usage. As the only German artist he participated in the international US-project The Beatles Complete on Ukulele created by the renowned New York based producers David Barratt and Roger Greenawalt with the song If I Needed Someone by George Harrison of The Beatles, which he produced as the German version Wenn ich einmal jemanden brauche. Continuing publications in literature and music like the pop-rock album Café Deutschland followed. To support his football club Fortuna Düsseldorf to go up to the 1. Bundesliga in 2012 he wrote and produced a single called Sonne des Westens.

He lives in Düsseldorf and is strongly related to the Rhineland.

== Books ==
- Großstadtsommer. 100 Gedichte. Martin Werhand Verlag, Melsbach 2015, ISBN 978-3-943910-13-1.
- Zeitungsstand. 50 Gedichte. Martin Werhand Verlag, Melsbach 2016, ISBN 978-3-943910-28-5.

== Publications (selection) ==
- Junge Lyrik – 50 Dichterinnen und Dichter. Anthologie, Martin Werhand Verlag, Melsbach 1999, ISBN 3-9806390-1-0.
- Meerbusch-Zeitsprünge. Sutton Verlag, Erfurt 2002, ISBN 3-89702-466-7
- Sting – Die Musik eines Rockstars. Ibidem Verlag, Hannover 2003, ISBN 3-89821-317-X

== Discography (selection) ==
=== Solo ===
- Sie ist weg (Maxi 07CJ001, LC 04196, Popcorn/Minerva Music, 2007)
- If I needed someone/Wenn ich jemanden brauche (Single, TBCOU, New York, 12.1.2010)
- Café Deutschland (Album SLM1302, LC 29211, SLMusic, 14. September 2012)
- Sonne des Westens (Single SLM1301, LC 29211, SLMusic, 19. October 2012)
- Große kleine Stadt (Single M 7264, Monopol Records, 12. October 2018)
- Songs aus dem Dachzimmer (Album M7271, Monopol Records, 12. July 2019)
- Blau (Album M7299, Monopol Records, 6. Aug 2021)

=== Collaboration with other artists ===
- Kymera, Microcosm (Album 19514.1, LC 06191, Tomte Music, 2003)
- Thomas Battenstein, Lines and Spaces (Album 19515.1, LC 06191, Tomte Music, 2004)
- Tucholsky Reloaded – Für eine neue Generation, various artists (Album 09TP011, LC 00860, Melodia/Minerva Music, 2009)
- Die beste Kneipe der Welt, various artists (Maxi 09DBK010, LC 08226, Oase/Minerva Music, 2009)

== Appearance ==
- Movie Jungle Child. Directed by Roland Suso Richter, UFA, 2011.

== Literature ==
- Christian Jahl In: Deutsches Literatur-Lexikon. Das 20. Jahrhundert - Nachtragsband: F - M Volume 2, Verlag Walter de Gruyter, 2020, ISBN 978-3-11-067790-4
- Christian Jahl In: Nicolai Riedel Bibliographisches Handbuch der deutschsprachigen Lyrik 1945–2020, Metzler, Heidelberg, 2023, S. 704, ISBN 978-3-662-65460-6
