= Metzler (disambiguation) =

Metzler is a surname

Metzler may refer to:

- 22583 Metzler, a Main-belt Asteroid
- Metzler Bank, a private banking company in Germany
- Metzler Orgelbau, a firm of organ builders based in Switzerland
- J. B. Metzler, a subsidiary of Springer Nature publishing group
