= Wolfram Goertz =

German journalist, musicologist, physician (born 1961)

Wolfram Goertz (born 1961) is a German journalist, musician and musicologist. He coordinates the special outpatient clinic for musician medicine at the University Hospital of Düsseldorf.

== Education ==
Goertz was born in Mönchengladbach. After he passed his Abitur in 1980 at the Albertus-Magnus-Gymnasium Viersen-Dülken, he studied musicology and philosophy in Cologne and Bochum as well as church music and medicine (doctoral studies) at the RWTH Aachen. He completed courses in choral conducting with Herbert Schernus (Cologne) and Eric Ericson (Stockholm).

== Work ==
Since 1978 he has written music and theatre reviews, among others for the Süddeutsche Zeitung, Neue Zürcher Zeitung, Fono Forum, various radio stations and since 1998 also for Die Zeit. Since 1989, he has been music editor of the Rheinische Post in Düsseldorf. In 1991, Goertz founded the jazz choir of the Hochschule Niederrhein, which he conducted until its disbandment in 2003 and with which he performed numerous concerts at home and abroad. In 2004, he conducted the world premiere of Alvin Curran's choral composition Music Is Not Music (text by John Cage) with the SWR Vokalensemble Stuttgart. As an organist, he has performed in Germany, the Netherlands, Belgium, France, Switzerland, Italy and Finland.

Goertz is also a member of the jury at major music competitions, including the Preis der deutschen Schallplattenkritik, at the State Choir Competition of the Landesmusikrat NRW and at the International Düsseldorf Organ Festival.

At the Robert Schumann Hochschule Düsseldorf, Goertz worked as a lecturer in interpretive analysis, orchestral repertoire and choral conducting.

Since 2005 Goertz worked at the Clinic for Cardiology at the St. Franziskus Hospital of the Krankenhaus Maria Hilf (Mönchengladbach), since 2010 also at the University Hospital Düsseldorf; there he has coordinated the new Interdisciplinary Outpatient Clinic for Musicians' Medicine since 2011.

In 2009, he presented his doctoral thesis on Strategies of an anxiety-relieving music accompanying therapy during cardiac catheter examinations for the degree of Dr. rer. medic. at the Medical Faculty of RWTH Aachen University.

== Awards ==
- 1994: Förderpreis für Literatur der Landeshauptstadt Düsseldorf
- 2009: Preis für Wissenschaftsjournalismus der Deutsche Gesellschaft für Kardiologie
- 2012: Medienpreis des Berufsverbandes der deutschen Augenärzte für sein Buch "Augen-Sprechstunde".

== Publications ==
- 2000: Klassik scheibchenweise – 100 CD-Tipps für Musikfreunde, ISBN 3-7700-1124-4
- 2002: Klassik scheibchenweise 2, ISBN 3-7700-1147-3
- 2006: Wolfram Goertz among others: Martha Argerich lesen & hören, Die Zeit Klassik Edition. ISBN 3-476-02207-2
- 2009: Strategien einer angstlösenden Musikbegleittherapie bei Herzkatheteruntersuchungen, Shaker Verlag, Aachen, ISBN 978-3-8322-8383-4
- 2011: Wolfram Goertz among others: Augen-Sprechstunde, Springer-Verlag Berlin Heidelberg. ISBN 978-3-642-17355-4
