= Renate Freund =

German author of short stories and poetry (born 1939)

- Born: 3 October 1939 (age 86); Neuwied, Rhineland-Palatinate, Germany
- Occupation: Writer
- Years active: 2012–present
- Website: Official website of Renate Freund (in German)

Renate Freund (born 3 October 1939, in Neuwied) is a German author of short stories and poetry.

== Life and work ==
Renate Freund was born in 1939 in Neuwied as the second of five children. Being a qualified shorthand clerk, she started her career as a clerical assistant in the purchasing department of a medium-sized enterprise. After that she worked in the technical department of the hospital Marien-Klinikum in Rhineland-Palatinate until she retired. Based on her interest in literature she later developed a talent for literary writing, especially short stories and poetry. Her first book of twelve short detective stories titled Der letzte Tanz (The Last Dance) was published in August 2016 by Martin Werhand Verlag. In January 2017 her poems were published in the anthology Abendfrieden, 100 Gedichte (Evening Peace, 100 poems). In the same year the same publisher issued her poetry book Himmelreich(Kingdom of Heaven) as part of the poetry series 50 sonnets. A third book of poetry, titled Sinnpuppe (Doll of Sense) was published in January 2018 as part of the series 50 Gedichte (50 poems). In December 2018, another volume in the poetry series 50 sonnets was published under the title Glassymphonien, and the volume 100 sonnets by the band Sonnenähren also appeared. In December 2019, three more volumes of poetry by Renate Freund were published in the MWV. The sonnet volume Lichthoffnung in the series 50 sonnets and the two volumes of poetry Winterruhe in the series 100 poems and Dorfidylle in the series 250 poems.

Renate Freund lives and works in Niederbieber, Rhineland-Palatinate.

== Publications (selection) ==
=== Books ===
- Der letzte Tanz. Krimi-Kurzgeschichten. Martin Werhand Verlag, Melsbach 2016, 150 p. ISBN 978-3-943910-29-2.
- Himmelreich. 50 Sonette. Martin Werhand Verlag, Melsbach 2017, 120 p. ISBN 978-3-943910-65-0.
- Sinnpuppe. 50 Gedichte. Martin Werhand Verlag, Melsbach 2018, 120 p. ISBN 978-3-943910-58-2.
- Glassymphonien. 50 Sonette. Martin Werhand Verlag, Melsbach 2018, 120 p. ISBN 978-3-943910-61-2.
- Sonnenähren. 100 Sonette. Martin Werhand Verlag, Melsbach 2018, 170 p. ISBN 978-3-943910-64-3.
- Lichthoffnung. 50 Sonette. Martin Werhand Verlag, Melsbach 2019, 120 p. ISBN 978-3-943910-49-0.
- Winterruhe. 100 Gedichte. Martin Werhand Verlag, Melsbach 2019, 170 p. ISBN 978-3-943910-48-3.
- Dorfidylle. 250 Gedichte. Martin Werhand Verlag, Melsbach 2019, 300 p. ISBN 978-3-943910-47-6.

=== Anthologies ===
- Abendfrieden. 100 Gedichte. Anthologie. Martin Werhand Verlag, Melsbach 2017, 150 p. ISBN 978-3-943910-27-8.

== Literature ==
- Renate Freund In: Deutsches Literatur-Lexikon. Das 20. Jahrhundert Nachtragsband: F - M Volume 2, Verlag Walter de Gruyter, 2020, ISBN 978-3-11-067790-4
- Renate Freund In: Nicolai Riedel Bibliographisches Handbuch der deutschsprachigen Lyrik 1945–2020, Metzler, Heidelberg, 2023, p. 619-620, ISBN 978-3-662-65460-6
