= Gerhard Nebel =

German writer (1903–1974)

Gerhard Nebel (1903–1974) was a German writer and cultural critic.

Nebel studied philosophy and classical philology in Freiburg, Marburg and Heidelberg from 1923 to 1927, under Martin Heidegger and Karl Jaspers. He worked as a teacher in the Ruhr for a short time but was suspended for "socialist agitation", being a member of the Socialist Workers' Party of Germany. He resumed teaching in 1933, and was again suspended within a year. He then travelled to Egypt, where he worked as a private tutor, intermittently working in Germany in 1937 before travelling in East Africa during 1938/9.

Nebel was drafted into the Luftwaffe and worked as a translator in Paris in 1941, where he met Ernst Jünger. After comparing fighter airplanes with insects in an essay, he was demoted and transferred as a construction soldier to Alderney. After the war, he worked again as a teacher. He published his diaries, and the essay collections Von den Elementen and Tyrannis und Freiheit. He retired in 1955, working as an independent author, his last book Hamann appearing in 1973.

Nebel switched his ideological alignment several times during his life; he identified as a social democrat, a marxist, a nihilist, an atheist, a reactionary and after World War II he developed his own idiosyncratic form of conservativism. His temper was choleric, and his style often polemic and zealous.

== Bibliography ==
- Feuer und Wasser. Hamburg 1939.
- Vom Geist der Savanne. Hamburg 1941.
- Von den Elementen. Essays. Marées, Wuppertal 1947.
- Tyrannis und Freiheit. Drei Eulen, Düsseldorf 1947.
- Bei den nördlichen Hesperiden. Tagebuch aus dem Jahre 1942. Marées, Wuppertal 1948.
- Ernst Jünger und das Schicksal des Menschen. Marées, Wuppertal 1948.
- Ernst Jünger. Abenteuer des Geistes. Marées, Wuppertal 1949.
- Auf ausonischer Erde. Italienisches Tagebuch 1943/44. Marées, Wuppertal 1949.
- Unter Partisanen und Kreuzfahrern. Klett, Stuttgart 1950.
- Weltangst und Götterzorn. Eine Deutung der griechischen Tragödie. Klett, Stuttgart 1951.
- Die Reise nach Tuggurt. Klett, Stuttgart 1952.
- Das Ereignis des Schönen. Klett, Stuttgart 1953.
- Phäakische Inseln. Eine Reise zum kanarischen Archipel. Klett-Cotta, Stuttgart 1954 (3rd ed. 1987, ISBN 3-608-95495-3).
- Feuer und Wasser. Ostafrikanische Bilder und Erinnerungen. Stuttgart 1955.
- Die Not der Götter. Welt und Mythos der Germanen. Hoffmann und Campe. Hamburg 1957.
- An den Säulen des Herakles. Andalusische und marokkanische Begegnungen. Klett, Hamburg 1957.
- Homer. Klett, Stuttgart 1959.
- Pindar und die Delphik. Klett, Stuttgart 1961.
- Orte und Feste. Zwischen Elm und Esterel. Hoffmann und Campe, Hamburg 1962.
- Hinter dem Walde. 16 Lektionen für Zeitgenossen. Hoffmann und Campe, Hamburg 1964.
- Zeit und Zeiten. Klett, Stuttgart 1965.
- Portugiesische Tage. Hoffmann und Campe, Hamburg 1966.
- Die Geburt der Philosophie. Klett, Stuttgart 1967.
- Meergeborenes Land. Griechische Reisen. Hoffmann und Campe, Hamburg 1968.
- Sokrates. Klett, Stuttgart 1969.
- Sprung von des Tigers Rücken. Klett, Stuttgart 1970.
- Hamann. Klett, Stuttgart 1973, ISBN 3-12-906060-X.
- Schmerz des Vermissens. Essays.ed. Gerald Zschorsch, Klett-Cotta, Stuttgart 2000, ISBN 3-608-93458-8.
- „alles Gefühl ist leiblich“. Ein Stück Autobiographie, ed. Nicolai Riedel, Marbach 2003, ISBN 3-933679-91-5.
- Ernst Jünger, Gerhard Nebel: Briefe (1938–1974), ed. Ulrich Fröschle und Michael Neumann. Klett-Cotta, Stuttgart 2003, ISBN 3-608-93626-2.
- Zwischen den Fronten. Kriegstagebücher 1942–1945. ed. Michael Zeller, wjs, Berlin 2010, ISBN 978-3-937989-69-3 .
