= Peter Philipp =

German writer, poet and comedian (1971–2014)

- Born: 16 July 1971; Düsseldorf, Northrhine-Westphalia, Germany
- Died: 6 February 2014 (aged 42); Düsseldorf, Northrhine-Westphalia, Germany
- Occupations: writer, poet and comedian
- Years active: 1998-2013
- Website: Website by Peter Philipp (in German)

Peter Philipp (16 July 1971 – 6 February 2014) was a German writer and comedian.

== Life and work ==
Peter Philipp was born in 1971 in Düsseldorf in Northrhine-Westphalia. There he studied from 1992 to 2000 German literature and philosophy at the Heinrich-Heine-Universität Düsseldorf. He published several books and founded the cabaret vocal ensemble Waschkraft, as its chief songwriter, bassist, singer and master of ceremonies, he served since 2000.

In 1998, the book Logisch-philosophische Untersuchungen was published by Walter de Gruyter. In 2000 Philipp published his first poetry book (Grupello publisher in Düsseldorf). In 2003, the book of poems Die Flötentöne was published. In 2004 he received the Förderpreis für Literatur der Landeshauptstadt Düsseldorf in Northrhine-Westphalia.

Philip lived as a freelance writer in Düsseldorf and wrote poetry and prose. He died on 6 February 2014 at the age of 42 in his home town of Düsseldorf.

== Awards ==
- 2004: Förderpreis für Literatur der Landeshauptstadt Düsseldorf
- 2006: 6. Schwelmer Kleinkunstpreis
- 2006: RP-Kleinkunstpreis „Goldener Xaver“
- 2007: Kleinkunstpreis „St. Ingberter Pfanne“
- 2008: Herborner Schlumpeweck
- 2009: Kleinkunstpreis der Eifel-Kulturtage „Goldene Berta 2009“

== Publications ==
=== Books ===
- “Fatimas Träume: Deutsche-Welle-Literaturwettbewerb für die arabischsprachige Welt”, Berlin 1994 (als Herausgeber zusammen mit George Khoury)
- “Logisch-philosophische Untersuchungen”, Berlin 1998
- “Kleine Automatenhunde”, Gedichte, Grupello-Verlag, Düsseldorf, 2000
- “Die Flötentöne - Ein Lehrgang in 12 Schritten”, Gedichte, Grupello-Verlag, Düsseldorf, 2003

=== Contributions in Anthologies ===
- “John Linthicum zugewandt” Grupello-Verlag, Düsseldorf, 2003
- “Nix verraten dich, Grupello!”, Eine Festschrift, Grupello-Verlag, Düsseldorf, 2005
- “M8worte”, mit Autorengruppe M8worte, 2005
- “Feinschmecker und Zeitschmecker”, mit Autorengruppe M8worte, 2006

== Discography ==
- 2003: „Waschblatt“, CD
- 2008: „Cocktail Scheisse Katze“, CD
- 2009: „Feine Stücke“, CD
