= Köln–Düsseldorfer Kriminalkomitee =

The Köln–Düsseldorfer Kriminalkomitee is an association of German crime writers who live in Cologne and Düsseldorf. It was founded in March 2009.

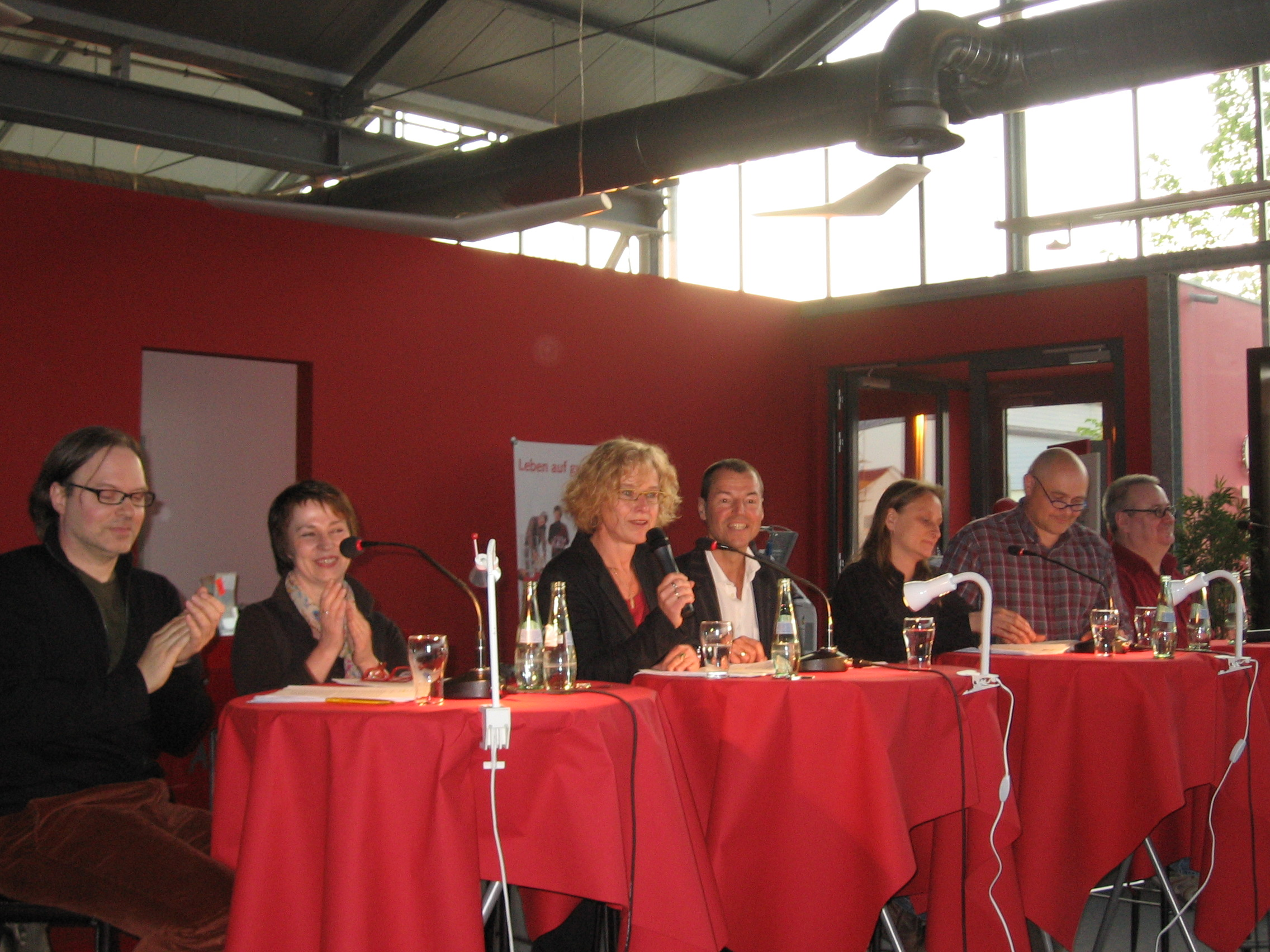
from left: Winges, Glaser, Stitz, Eckert, Klewe, Conrath, Schüller

Members are Martin Conrath, Horst Eckert, Sabine Klewe from Düsseldorf and Brigitte Glaser, Martin Schüller, Ilka Stitz and Stefan Winges from Cologne.

The authors join and take readings on the texts to a dialogue. The name alludes to the Cologne Carnival and the Düsseldorf Carnival to the tradition of the two cities and has an ironic look at the prevailing mutual animosities.
