= Meinolf Finke =

German writer and poet

- Born: 14 August 1963 (age 62); Arnsberg, Germany
- Occupations: Writer and poet
- Years active: 2006–present
- Website: Official website of Meinolf Finke (in German)

Meinolf Finke (born 14 August 1963 in Arnsberg) is a German writer and poet.

== Life and career ==
Meinolf Finke was born 1963 in Arnsberg (Westphalia). After obtaining the Abitur at Gymnasium Laurentianum Arnsberg, military service and a training as banker he started his studies of business economics at University of Bamberg in 1987, which he completed with the degree of a graduate in business administration. After that he went for local language studies to France an Italy. Since 1993 he has been working in the field of tax accountancy and auditing in the Rhineland.

In addition to his professional activities in accountancy, Finke developed his talent in writing, preferably poetry. He first published some of his poems in the anthology of poetry Die Jahreszeiten der Liebe. In March 2014 his first own book of poetry Zauberwelten in the series 100 Poems was published by Martin Werhand Verlag. His second book of poetry followed in November 2015, edited by Martin Werhand and entitled Lichtgestöber in the series 100 Sonnets by the same publisher. His third book was published December 2016 in the series 50 Sonnets entitled Wintersonne. Another book in the series 50 Sonnets, entitled Goldregenzeit was published in September 2017. In December 2019, a best-of-volume with Finke's poems was published in the series 250 poems in the MWV under the title Blütenlese.

Meinolf Finke's poetry is characterized by a classical, predominantly romantic style, as he often writes traditional sonnets similar to those by August von Platen-Hallermünde.

Meinolf Finke lives and works in Bonn.

== Publications (selection) ==
=== Books ===
- Zauberwelten. 100 Gedichte. Martin Werhand Verlag, Melsbach 2014, 142 p. ISBN 978-3-943910-03-2.
- Lichtgestöber. 100 Sonette. Martin Werhand Verlag, Melsbach 2015, 164 p. ISBN 978-3-943910-04-9.
- Wintersonne. 50 Sonette. Martin Werhand Verlag, Melsbach 2016, 120 p. ISBN 978-3-943910-34-6.
- Goldregenzeit. 50 Sonette. Martin Werhand Verlag, Melsbach 2017, 120 p. ISBN 978-3-943910-59-9.
- Blütenlese. 250 Gedichte. Martin Werhand Verlag, Melsbach 2019, 302 p. ISBN 978-3-943910-37-7.

=== Anthologies ===
- Die Jahreszeiten der Liebe. Anthology, Martin Werhand Verlag, Melsbach 2006, ISBN 3-9806390-4-5.
