= Alexander Litschev =

- Born: 1946 (age 79–80); Pleven, Bulgaria
- Occupations: Historian, philosopher, author, lecturer, and editor
- Years active: 1973–present
- Website: Website at the University of Düsseldorf (in German)

Alexander Litschev (also known as Aleksandar Ličev, Aleksandar Litschew or written, Bulgarian Александър Личев; * 1946 in Pleven, Bulgaria) is a Bulgarian historian and university lecturer in philosophical anthropology and the history of philosophy at the University of Düsseldorf.

== Biography ==
=== Early life and work ===
In 1967 Litschev began to study history and philosophy at the University of Sofia. After graduating in 1973, he worked for two years as an assistant for the history of philosophy at the University of Sofia. From 1976 to 1990 he worked as a research assistant at the Institute of Philosophy. From 1988 to 1990, he taught as a professor of the history of philosophy and philosophical anthropology at the University of Sofia.

Since 1991 he has been a lecturer in East European history at the University of Düsseldorf. As part of his teaching assignment, his research interests are: history of ideas of the South Slavs, Russian intellectual history and philosophy. He teaches courses in Russian intellectual history and mentality.

As a historian, Litschev also examines German-Bulgarian relations in the 19th and 20th centuries, taking account of the German minority in Bulgaria. Numerous publications from Alexander Litschev are published in Bulgarian and German language.

Litschev lives and works in Düsseldorf, and with his wife Anna, a sociologist, he has one daughter, the poet Angela Litschev.

== Publications (selection) ==
=== Books ===
Publications (as an author)

- Die Philosophie auf der Suche nach dem Menschen (Das Menschenbild in der Geschichte der Philosophie), Sofia 1978.
- Die Philosophen (gemeinsam mit R. Radev u. I. Stefanov), Sofia 1998 (3 Aufl.)
- Rußland verstehen: Schlüssel zum russischen Wesen, Grupello-Verlag, Düsseldorf 2001, ISBN 3-933749-40-9
- Die russische Zivilisation: Selbstverständnis, Identität und Mentalität, Merus Verlag, Hamburg 2006, ISBN 978-3-939519-22-5

Publications (as an editor)

- Der Mensch, der die Welt veränderte: 165 Jahre seit der Geburt und 100 Jahre seit dem Tode von Karl Marx, (gemeinsam mit A. Stefanov). Sofia 1983.
- Abschied vom Marxismus: Sowjetische Philosophie im Umbruch, (gemeinsam mit D. Kegler). Rowohlt, Reinbek bei Hamburg. 1992.

== Other works (selection) ==
- Das Menschenbild bei Dostojevskij. In: LIK, 5/1971
- Das Problem des Menschen bei Feuerbach. In: Feuerbach – Geschichte und Aktualität. Sofia 1972.
- Das Problem des Menschen bei Platon. In: Filosofska misal, 11/1975
- Hegel und die Dialektik des Werdens des Menschen in der Geschichte. In: Filosofska misal, 9/1976
- Kant und das Problem des Werdens des Menschen. In: Kant – 250 Jahre seit seiner Geburt. Sofia 1978.
- Copernican Revolution or Ptolemaic Counter-Revolution (Kants Cosmic Humanism). In: Darshana International, 4/1985
- Ist Kants Philosophie anthropologisch?. In: Filosofska misal, 9/1986.
- Die Französische Revolution und ihre deutsche Theorie. In: Filosofska misal, 11/1989
- Die Philosophie der Innerlichkeit. Zum Selbstverständnis der russischen Philosophie (Gemeinsam mit D. Kegler). In: der blaue reiter, Nr. 20/2005
