= Chrystkowo =

Village in Kuyavian-Pomeranian Voivodeship, Poland

- Village
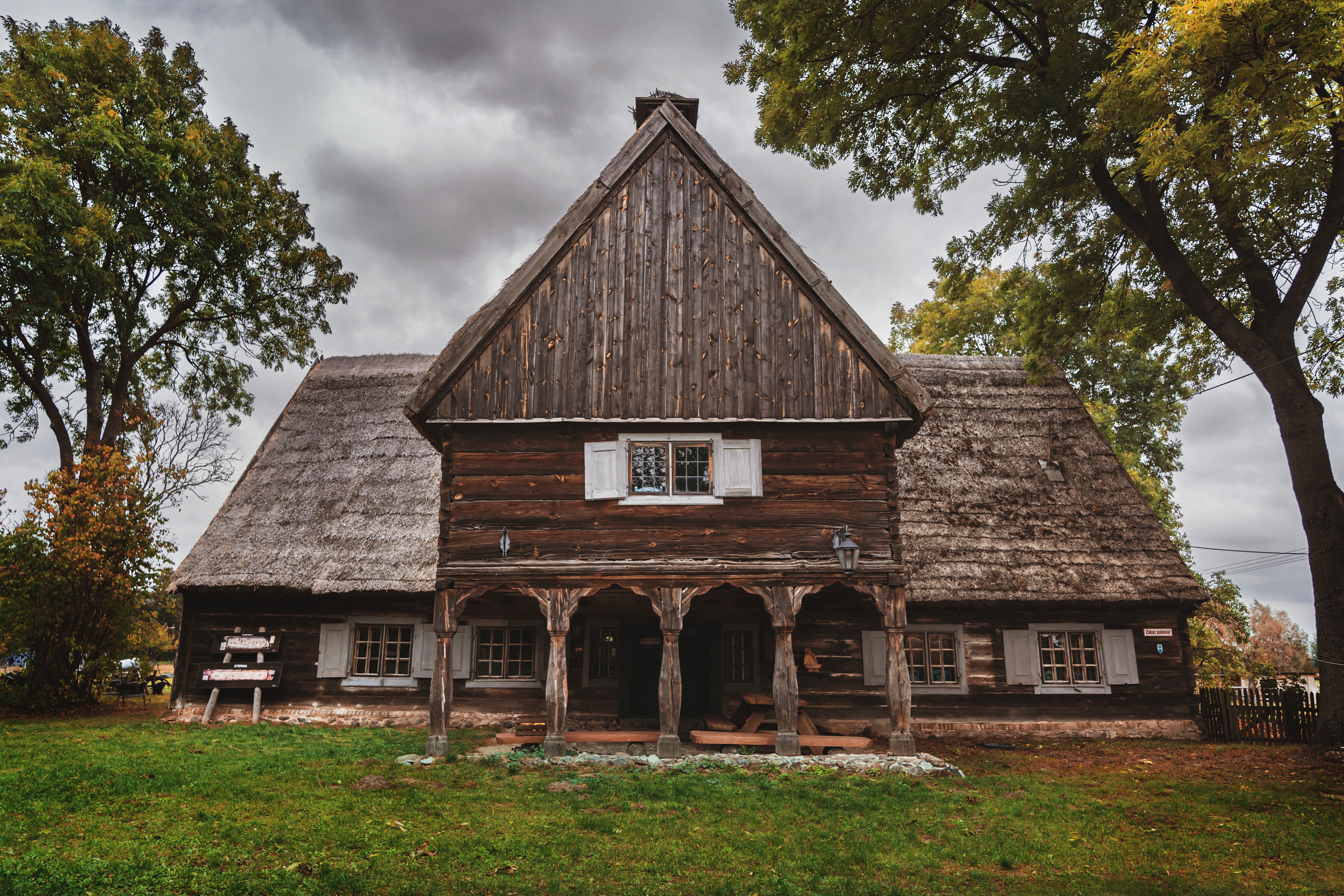
- Mennonite wooden house from 1770

- Location within Poland
- Coordinates: 53°20′N 18°20′E
- Country: Poland
- Voivodeship: Kuyavian-Pomeranian
- County: Świecie
- Gmina: Świecie
- Population: 170
- Time zone: UTC+1 (CET)
  - Summer (DST): UTC+2 (CEST)
- Vehicle registration: CSW

Chrystkowo [xrɨstˈkɔvɔ] is a village in the administrative district of Gmina Świecie, within Świecie County, Kuyavian-Pomeranian Voivodeship, in north-central Poland.

Chrystkowo was established in the 17th century by a Mennonite community. The Mennonites in this period were settling in the lower Vistula valley and Żuławy region escaping persecution in Western Europe. There is a well-preserved wooden Mennonite house from 1770 in the village.

== Notable residents ==
- Paul Boldt (1885-1921), German poet
