= Förderpreis für Literatur der Landeshauptstadt Düsseldorf =

German literary award

The Förderpreis für Literatur der Landeshauptstadt Düsseldorf is a German literary award donated by the City of Düsseldorf in North Rhine-Westphalia. The Prize for Literature in support of the City of Düsseldorf has been awarded since 1972 by the city council based on the decision of the prize jury.

== Prize money ==
The Prize is endowed with 4,000 euros.

== Award criteria ==
The Förderpreis für Literatur der Landeshauptstadt Düsseldorf is awarded once a year to artists and groups, especially in the areas of poetry, writing, review and translation. The prize is awarded either for a single artistic achievement or for the overall performance to date of a young artist.

A female winner should generally not be older than 40 years, a male winner no older than 35 years. A further award of the Prize to the same artist is allowed if there is a minimum period of five years between the ceremonies.

== Winners ==
- 2022: Vera Vorneweg, author
- 2021: Jana Buch, author
- 2020: Pearl Seemann, author
- 2019: Prize not awarded this year
- 2018: Tobias Steinfeld, author
- 2017: Marlene Röder, author
- 2016: Lea Beiermann, author
- 2015: Dorian Steinhoff, author
- 2014: David Finck, author
- 2013: Hannah Dübgen, author
- 2012: Axel von Ernst, author
- 2011: Philip Holstein, critics
- 2010: Vera Elizabeth Gerling, translator
- 2009: Alexander Conrad, author and translator
- 2008: Reglindis Rauca, author
- 2007: Pia Helfferich, author
- 2006: Sabine Klewe, writer
- 2005: Angela Litschev, poet
- 2004: Peter Philipp †, writer
- 2003: Frank Schablewski, author
- 2002: Philip Schiemann, author
- 2001: Martin Baltscheit, author
- 2000: Silvia Kaffke, author
- 1999: Pamela Granderath, author
- 1998: Alexander Nitzberg, author
- 1997: Saskia Fischer, author
- 1996: Barbara Bongartz, author
- 1995: Thomas Hoeps, author / poet
- 1994: Caroline Ebner actress / Wolfram Goertz, critics
- 1993: Peter Bamler, actor / Karin Beier, director
- 1992: Kai Butcher, writer / André Ronca †, writer
- 1991: Isabell Lawrence, translator / VEV- cabaret
- 1990: Jens Berthold †, actor
- 1989: Daniela El Aidi, mime / Kajo Scholz †, poet
- 1988: Claudia Schaller, writer / Hubert Winkels, author and journalist
- 1987: Barbara Zimmermann, children's book author / Heinz-Norbert Jocks, journalist
- 1986: Georg Heinzen, Uwe Koch, authors / Thomas Kling †, author
- 1985: Liane Dirks, writer / Ulrich Matthes, actor
- 1984: Helga Lippelt, writer / Arpad Kraupa, actor
- 1983: Krista Posch, actress / Anton Bachleitner, officials
- 1982: Jhawemirc Theatre Group / Raimund Hoghe, writer
- 1981: Bernd Schultze actor / Dorothée Haese Ling, writer
- 1980: Mark Völlenklee, actor / Detlef Wolters, writer
- 1979: Doris Wolf, amateur theater "stage 79" / Jens Prüss, writer
- 1978: Charlotte Schwab, actress / Wolfgang Weck †, writer
- 1977: Peter K. Kirchhof, writer / Udo Samel, actor
- 1976: Jutta Hahn, actress / Niklas Stiller, writer
- 1975: Gerhild Didusch, actress / Winfried Zangerle †, puppeteers
- 1974: Marianne Hoika, actress / Barbara Ming Mandok, writer
- 1973: Ilse Ritter, actress / Stobbe born Karin Struck, writer
- 1972: Ferdinand Kriwet, writer / Wolf Seesemann, director

† = deceased

== Literature ==
- Förderpreis für Literatur der Landeshauptstadt Düsseldorf. In: Kürschners Deutscher Literatur-Kalender 2010/2011: Band I: A-O. Band II: P-Z., Walter De Gruyter Incorporated, 2010, P. 1427
