= Sabine Klewe =

German writer (born 1966)

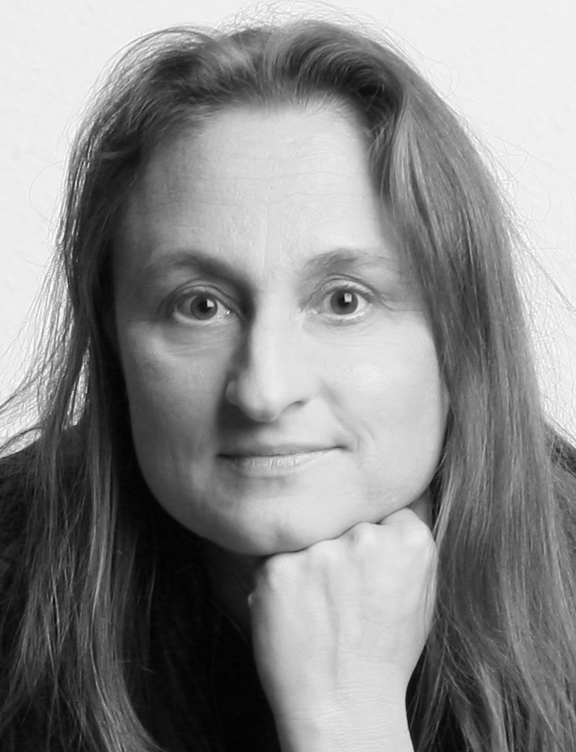
- Born: 1 February 1966 (age 60); Düsseldorf, Germany
- Occupation: writer
- Years active: 2004–present
- Website: Website by Sabine Klewe (in German)

Sabine Klewe pseudonym: Sabine Martin (born 1 February 1966 in Düsseldorf) is a German writer, who published mainly crime novels.

== Life and work ==
Sabine Klewe, born 1966 in Düsseldorf, studied literature in Düsseldorf and London. Besides her work as an author she is also a freelance literary translator and lecturer at the Heinrich-Heine-Universität Düsseldorf.

In November 2006 she received for her short story "Marilyn" the Carinthian Thriller Prize (3rd place) and in December 2006 the Förderpreis für Literatur der Landeshauptstadt Düsseldorf in Northrhine-Westphalia

Since 2004, she has published five thrillers about the hobby investigator Katrin Sandmann. Together with the author Martin Conrath she has released four historical crime novels. In April 2013 appeared to her so far 12th novel: Die weißen Schatten der Nacht is the second case for the Düsseldorf investigators duo Lydia Louis and Christopher Solomon.

Sabine Klewe is a member of the Köln-Düsseldorfer Kriminalkomitee. She is the mother of three sons and lives in Bilk.

== Awards ==
- 2006: Förderpreis für Literatur der Landeshauptstadt Düsseldorf
- 2006: Kärntner Krimipreis (3rd place)
- 2013: Arbeitsstipendium der Landeshauptstadt Düsseldorf

== Publications ==
=== Katrin Sandman series ===
- 2004: Schattenriss
- 2005: Kinderspiel
- 2006: Wintermärchen
- 2008: Blutsonne
- 2013: Schwanenlied

=== Lydia Louis and Christopher Solomon series ===
- 2012: Der Seele weißes Blut
- 2013: Die weißen Schatten der Nacht

=== Historical novels ===
- 2007: Das Geheimnis der Madonna (along with Martin Conrath)
- 2008: Das Vermächtnis der Schreiberin (along with Martin Conrath)
- 2009: Die schwarzseidene Dame
- 2012: Die Henkerin (under the pseudonym Sabine Martin with Martin Conrath)
- 2013: Die Tränen der Henkerin (under the pseudonym Sabine Martin with Martin Conrath)

=== Liz Montario and Georg Stadler series ===
- 2013: Schwesterlein, komm stirb mit mir (as Karen Sander)
- 2014: Wer nicht hören will, muss sterben (as Karen Sander)
- 2015: Ich sehe was, und das ist tot (as Karen Sander)
