= Frank Findeiß =

German poet

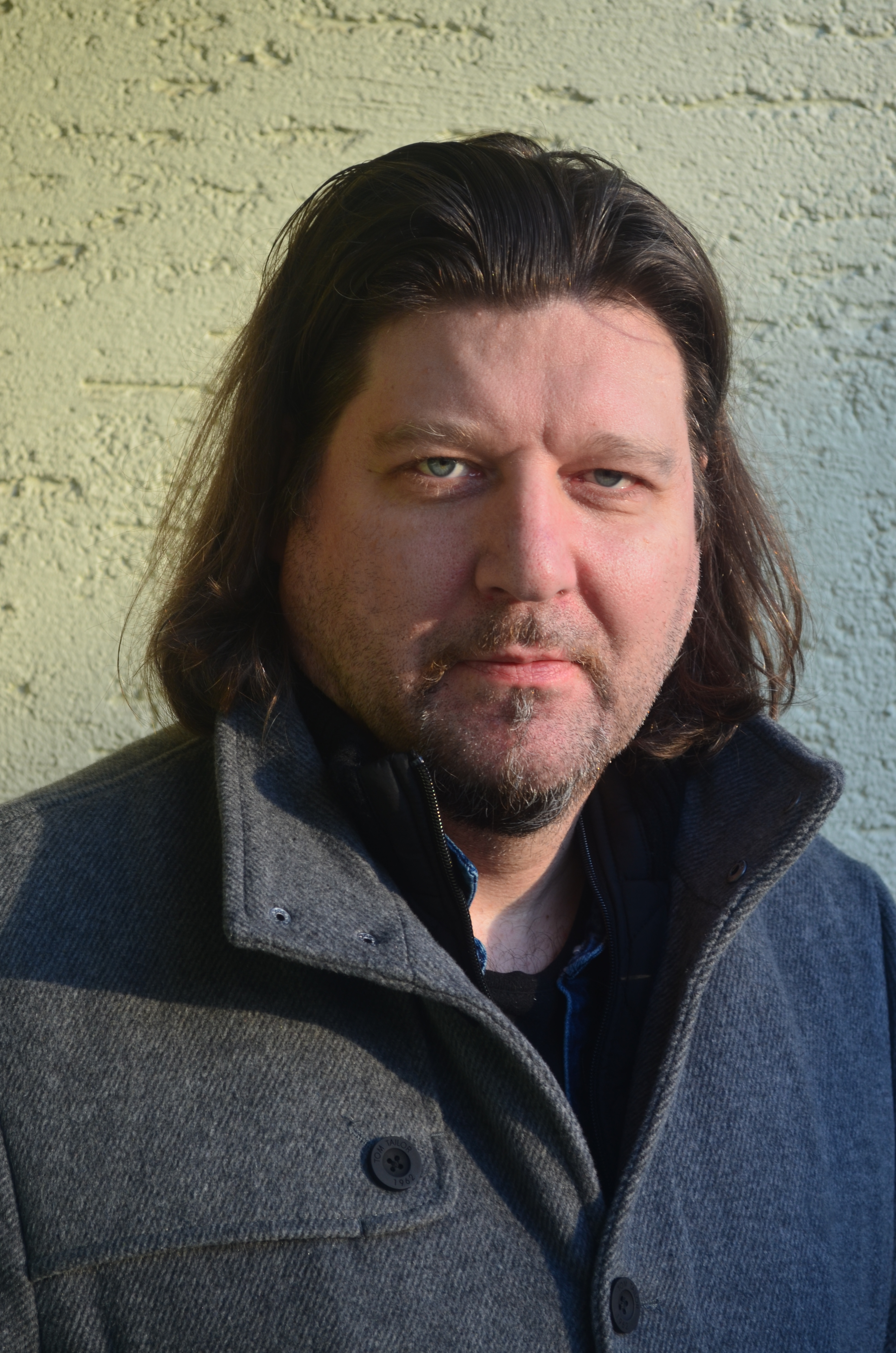
- Born: 19 September 1971 (age 54); Trier, Rhineland-Palatinate, West Germany
- Occupations: Author, journalist and poet
- Years active: 2002–present
- Website: Official website of Frank Findeiß (in German)

Frank Findeiß (born 19 September 1971 in Trier) is a German poet.

== Life and work ==
Frank Findeiß was born in Trier (Rhineland-Palatinate) in 1971. After his abitur at the Staatliche Hilda-Gymnasium in Koblenz and his military service in the Heeresmusikkorps 300 he started studying philosophy, educational science and sociology at Rheinische Friedrich-Wilhelms-Universität Bonn. In summer 2001 he obtained the degree of a Magister Artium with a dissertation on Karl Marx. After several internships and working as freelance contributor for a radio station as well as for the online magazine bumbanet.de he started training as a specialized journalist at Freie Journalistenschule in Berlin in 2008, which he successfully completed in 2010.

While studying in Bonn, and during his work after that, he has devoted himself to creative writing since the middle of the 1990s. At the beginning of the 2000s he started standing out in publications, so that he has so far featured in numerous poetry anthologies, among them the series Junge Lyrik by Martin Werhand Verlag. His poetry was also recognized in projects that got supra-regional attention, such as the event Poesie bewegt in 2006/2007, organized by the Bremer Verkehrsbetriebe and the foundation Apollon-Stiftung with the art directors Renato Mismetti and Joachim Tuz, and the event Lesezeichen 2014, organized by the Förderverein Forum-Literaturbüro e. V. in Hildesheim. In April 2015 his first own poetry book Sozialisolation was published in the series 100 Gedichte by Martin Werhand Verlag. His second poetry book was published one year later with the title Blutonium in the series 100 Gedichte by the same publisher. A third, fourth and fifth book of poetry was published in the years 2017, 2018 and 2019 in the series 50 Gedichte with the title Albtrauma, Kassiber and Alphasucht. His works deal mainly with political and socio-critical topics.

Frank Findeiß works as freelance music teacher in Bad Godesberg.

== Publications (selection) ==
=== Books ===
- Psychologische Elemente in der Anthropologie von Karl Marx: Ein Beitrag zur Genese seines Menschenbildes. AVM Akademische Verlagsgemeinschaft München, Munich 2014, ISBN 978-3-86924-576-8.
- Sozialisolation. 100 Gedichte. Martin Werhand Verlag, Melsbach 2015, 168 p. ISBN 978-3-943910-16-2.
- Blutonium. 100 Gedichte. Martin Werhand Verlag, Melsbach 2016, 168 p. ISBN 978-3-943910-22-3.
- Herbert Grönemeyers Menschenbild im Spannungsfeld zwischen Philanthropie und Kulturpessimismus – Das Verhältnis von Individuum und Gesellschaft in seinen Texten. Verlag Die Blaue Eule, Essen, 2017, 98 p. ISBN 978-3-89924-460-1.
- Albtrauma. 50 Gedichte. Martin Werhand Verlag, Melsbach 2017, 120 p. ISBN 978-3-943910-43-8.
- Kassiber. 50 Gedichte. Martin Werhand Verlag, Melsbach 2018, 120 p. ISBN 978-3-943910-62-9.
- Alphasucht. 50 Gedichte. Martin Werhand Verlag, Melsbach 2019, 120 p. ISBN 978-3-943910-66-7.

=== Anthologies (selection) ===
- Junge Lyrik III – 50 Dichterinnen und Dichter. Anthology, Martin Werhand Verlag, Melsbach 2002, ISBN 3-9806390-3-7. Also second, revised edition.
- Fluchten – Zufluchten. Helicon Verlag, Kiel 2003, ISBN 3-935569-02-5
- Erinnerung an Licht. Engelsdorfer Verlag, Berlin 2005, ISBN 3-938873-48-5
- Von Wegen – eine Anthologie des Literarischen Vereins der Pfalz. Marsilius Verlag, Speyer 2005, ISBN 3-929242-38-9
- Gedichte – best german underground lyriks. Acheron Verlag, Altenburg 2006, ISBN 3-9810222-1-1
- Die Jahreszeiten der Liebe. Anthology, Martin Werhand Verlag, Melsbach 2006, ISBN 3-9806390-4-5.
- Die Tyrannei von Feder & Flasche – Schriftsteller über Alkohol. Acheron Verlag, Altenburg 2006, ISBN 3-9810222-2-X
- Momente & Landschaften. Engelsdorfer Verlag, Berlin 2007, ISBN 3-86703-264-5
- Frauen – Männer. Elbverlag, Torgau 2014, ISBN 978-3-941127-27-2
- Strohblumenstörung – Politische Dichtung der Gegenwart I. Chiliverlag, Verl 2015, ISBN 978-3-943292-24-4
- Weißt Du noch? – Anekdoten aus dem Leben – Erinnerungen. Wendepunkt-Verlag, Weiden 2015, ISBN 978-3-938728-66-6
- Fassadenflucht – Politische Dichtung der Gegenwart II. Chiliverlag, Verl 2015, ISBN 978-3-943292-32-9
- Herzschlaf – Gedichte & Kurzprosa über Trauer, Trost und Hoffnung. Chiliverlag, Verl 2015, ISBN 978-3-943292-35-0

== Memberships ==
- Verband deutscher Schriftstellerinnen und Schriftsteller (VS)
- Deutscher Fachjournalisten-Verband (DFJV)
