= Paul Boldt =

German poet

Paul Boldt (1885, Christfelde, West Prussia - 1921, Freiburg im Breisgau) was one of the poets of German Expressionism.

Boldt was born in the town of Christfelde an der Weichsel in the countryside of West Prussia, an area which is now a part of Poland. After finishing his secondary education, he studied philology at universities in Munich, Marburg, and Berlin without taking a degree. Once in Berlin, he started associating with the writers and artists who frequented the city's many cafes and began writing poetry himself.

In 1912, his first published poems appeared in Die Aktion, a magazine most frequently associated with the Expressionist movement. Two years later, he published his only book, Junge Pferde! Junge Pferde! (Young Horses! Young Horses).

He was drafted into the German Army at the beginning of World War I, but was discharged in 1916 regarded psychologically unfit to serve. It was during his time in the military that he stopped writing poetry, and the last of his poems to appear in print during his lifetime came out in 1918.

Boldt died at the age of 35 from an embolism that was a complication of surgery for a hernia. Since his death, he has been largely forgotten, unlike other Expressionist poets writing in German, such as Gottfried Benn, Georg Heym, and Georg Trakl. (There are, in fact, no photographs or likenesses of Boldt known to exist.) However, in the last few decades there has been a movement seeking to revive recognition for what many readers and critics believe to be his considerable poetic gifts.

Most recently, there has been a "mini-renaissance" of Boldt's reputation in the German-speaking world, as his complete works have been republished for the first time in over a quarter-century; specifically in two volumes: Junge Pferde! Junge Pferde! ("Young Horses! Young Horses!") and "Auf der Terrasse des Cafe Josty" ("On the Terrace of Cafe Josty"), published by Edition Razamba in 2008 and 2009, respectively. A compilation book of poetry, titled Herbstpark was published in January 2018 as part of the series "50 zeitlose Gedichte" (50 timeless poems) at Martin Werhand Verlag.

English-language translations of some of Boldt's poems can be found in "The Online-Archive with the oeuvre of Paul Boldt" listed below.
