= Stephan Koranyi =

German writer (1956–2021)

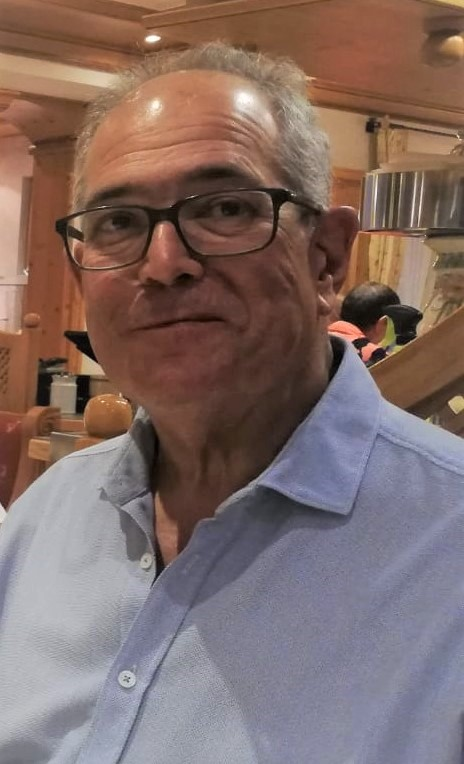
- Stephan Koranyi, 2020
- Born: 13 September 1956; Germany
- Died: 11 September 2021 (aged 64); Germany
- Occupations: Philologist, author, lecturer, and editor
- Years active: 1985–2021
- Website: Stephan Koranyi (in German)

Stephan Koranyi (13 September 1956 – 11 September 2021) was a German philologist, author, lecturer, and an editor.

== Biography ==
Stephan Koranyi was born in 1956. He studied German philology, philosophy and theater studies at the Free University of Berlin and at LMU Munich. In 1981, he received a Master of Arts on Goethe's "Campaign in France". Koranyi examined German literature in terms of genre, form, content, and motifs as well as looking at it historically by author and epoch, (especially on Goethe). In 1983 his dissertation Autobiographik und Wissenschaft im Denken Goethes at the Philosophical Faculty of Language and Literature II of LMU Munich was accepted.

From 1983 to 1986 Koranyi worked in the Department for Classics Editing at the dtv Verlagsgesellschaft, first as a publishing trainee, then as an editor. Additionally, he taught at LMU Munich.

From October 1986 he was in charge of publishing rights and licences at Reclam. From 1993 to 2017 he also was authorised representative of the publishing house. Additionally, he was responsible for editions mainly of contemporary authors, among others of the Icelandic writer Jón Kalman Stefánsson and Dutch authors such as Pieter Steinz and J. Bernlef.

== Works ==
In 1985 he was an editor of the novel Gabriele written by Johanna Schopenhauer and in 1987 he edited the novel Laudin und die Seinen by Jakob Wassermann. Both books were published by German publishing company dtv (Deutscher Taschenbuch Verlag).

Additionally to his work as lecturer and expert of German Christmas culture he published the following titles: Reclams Weihnachtsbuch. Erzählungen, Lieder, Gedichte, Briefe, Betrachtungen. Stuttgart: Reclam (1988), Weihnachtsgedichte (2003); Weihnachtszauber Winternacht. Geschichten und Gedichte (2005), and Und das schönste Fest ist da. Weihnachtliche Gedichte (2005), Gedichte zur Weihnacht (2009), Weihnachten. Gedichte (2011); Fröhliches Fest. Weihnachtsgeschichten (2012).

Koranyi was in charge of several editions of Wiglaf Droste's works. After Droste's death Koranyi edited Tisch und Bett (2020), Droste's last poems, at Antje Kunstmann Verlag.

Stephan Koranyi died September 11, 2021, two days before his 65th birthday.

== Publications (selection) ==
=== Publications (as an editor at dtv) ===
- Johanna Schopenhauer: Gabriele. Roman. Deutscher Taschenbuch Verlag, München 1985, ISBN 3-423-02158-6.
- Jakob Wassermann: Laudin und die Seinen. Roman. Deutscher Taschenbuch Verlag, München 1987, ISBN 3-423-10767-7.

=== Publications (as an editor at Reclam) ===
- Reclams Weihnachtsbuch. Erzählungen, Lieder, Gedichte, Briefe, Betrachtungen. Reclam, Stuttgart 1988, ISBN 3-15-010352-5.
- Heiteres darüberstehen. Geschichten und Gedichte zum Vergnügen. Reclam, Stuttgart 1990, ISBN 3-15-040004-X.
- Liebe, Liebe, Liebe. Geschichten, Gedichte und Gedanken. Reclam, Stuttgart 1991.
- Weihnachtsgedichte. Reclam, Stuttgart 2003, ISBN 3-15-018291-3.
- Weihnachtszauber Winternacht. Geschichten und Gedichte. Reclam, Stuttgart 2005, ISBN 3-15-010580-3.
- Und das schönste Fest ist da. Weihnachtliche Gedichte. Reclam, Stuttgart 2005, ISBN 3-379-00858-3.
- Alles Gute. Heitere Geschichten. Reclam, Stuttgart 2007, ISBN 978-3-15-010851-2.
- Gedanken sind Kräfte. Bibelworte – Worte zur Bibel. Reclam, Stuttgart 2007, ISBN 978-3-15-010635-8.
- Gedichte zur Weihnacht. Reclam, Stuttgart 2009, ISBN 978-3-15-010719-5.
- Weihnachten. Gedichte. Reclam, Stuttgart 2011, ISBN 978-3-15-018894-1.
- with Gabriele Seifert: Fröhliches Fest. Weihnachtsgeschichten. Reclam, Stuttgart 2012, ISBN 978-3-15-010884-0.
- with Gabriele Seifert: Immer heiter auf der Leiter. Geschichten. Reclam, Stuttgart 2013, ISBN 978-3-15-010910-6.
- Reclams Adeventskalender. Reclam, Stuttgart 2014, ISBN 978-3-15-010987-8.
- with Gabriele Seifert: Gute Tage – schöne Stunden: Feriengeschichten. Reclam, Stuttgart 2014, ISBN 978-3-15-010977-9.
- with Gabriele Seifert: Weihnachtsüberraschung: Geschichten. Reclam, Stuttgart 2015, ISBN 978-3-15-011037-9.
- with Gabriele Seifert: Verspätung! Geschichten für wenn's mal wieder länger dauert. Reclam, Stuttgart 2015, ISBN 978-3-15-019335-8.
- with Gabriele Seifert: Weihnachten auf Besuch. Reclam, Stuttgart 2016, ISBN 978-3-15-011077-5.
- Weihnachtsgedichte. Reclam, Ditzingen 2017, ISBN 978-3-15-011132-1.
- with Gabriele Seifert: Stille Nacht und Feuerwerk: Geschichten und Gedichte. Reclam, Ditzingen 2017, ISBN 978-3-15-011129-1.
- with Gabriele Seifert: Reclams Adventskalender. Reclam, Ditzingen 2017, ISBN 978-3-15-011134-5.
- with Gabriele Seifert: Frühling für Fortgeschrittene: Geschichten. Reclam, Ditzingen 2017, ISBN 978-3-15-011089-8.
- Reclams Weihnachtsbuch: Gedichte, Geschichten und Lieder. Reclam, Ditzingen 2019, ISBN 978-3-15-011234-2.

=== Publications (as an editor at Kunstmann) ===
Wiglaf Droste: Tisch und Bett. Antje Kunstmann Verlag, München 2020, ISBN 978-3-95614-356-4.
