= Kristiane Allert-Wybranietz =

German author and poet

Kristiane Allert-Wybranietz (1955–2017) was a writer and poet.

She grew up in a small village in the Auetal, a valley near Hanover, Germany. After an interval of some years, she has again made her home in this region. She began writing poetry at the age of 18 and published her first book of poetry, Trotz alledem (In Spite of Everything) in 1980, at the age of 25. Three more books followed: Liebe Grüße (Warm Greetings) (1982), Wenn's doch so einfach wär (If It Were Only That Simple) (1984) and Du sprichst von Nähe (You Speak of Closeness) (1986). Her books became bestsellers and have made her one of the most successful poets in Germany today. In her poems, Allert-Wybranietz deals with common things, feelings and relationships. In "Du sprichst von Nähe," she raises questions about being close and intimate with another person.

== General references ==
- Moeller, Jack; Adolph, Winnifred R.; Mabee, Barbara; Berger, Simone (2002), Kaleidoskop (6 ed.), Boston, MA: Houghton Mifflin Company, ISBN 0-618-10312-0
