= Thalia (bookstore) =

German book shop chain

Thalia Bücher GmbH
- Industry: Retail
- Headquarters: Hagen, Germany
- Revenue: 2,200,000,000 (2025)
- Number of employees: 7,000 (2025)
- Parent: Verlag Herder
- Website: thalia.de thalia.at thalia.ch

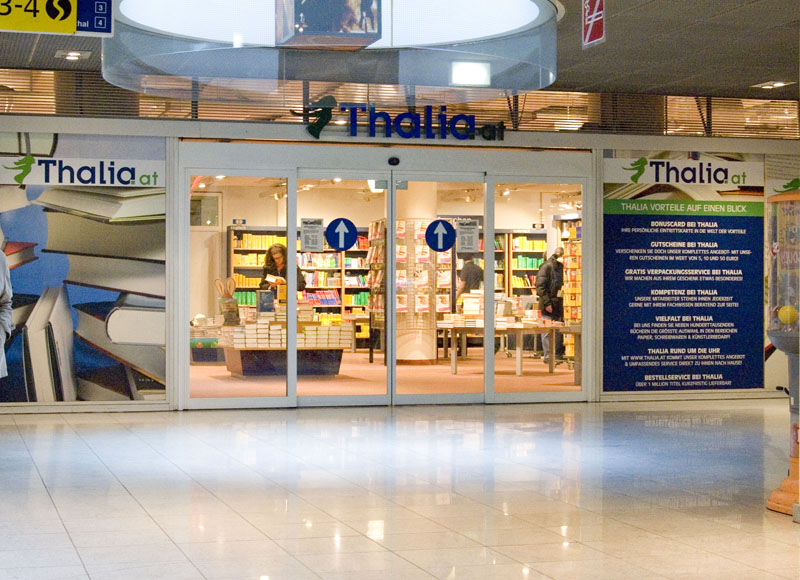
Thalia bookstore in Vienna

Thalia is a chain of more than 350 bookshops in Germany and Austria (both countries with fixed book prices), as well as a further 30 bookshops in Switzerland.

== Bookshops ==
The bookshops are often located in shopping centres Depending on the local situation, Thalia sometimes also refrains from building a new shop in favour of purchasing an available building. Whole chains of bookshops have occasionally been taken over by Thalia.

== Local reception ==
Since Thalia, mainly owned by Herder Publishing Group, is a prosperous enterprise which can afford to sustain relatively large, well equipped shops with many books in stock and long opening hours, small local shops are prone to resent the opening of a Thalia shop in their area. Nonetheless, fixed prices for books, at least in Germany, give smaller competitors a chance. However Thalia has also taken over smaller, independent bookshops.

== Multichannel marketing ==
The company utilises multichannel marketing and has therefore taken a stake in an established German online book shop. Customers can order books online and collect them from a branch. Customers can also place orders by phone at Thalia branches. Thalia also sells gift cards that can be used in their shops as well as online.

== E-books ==
In 2008, Thalia committed itself to the German e-book market and made a deal with Sony related to Sony's e-book reader. The growing demand in e-books convinced Thalia to announce the release of their own device. In the same year, the "Oyo" (basically a German version of the 4FFF N618) was launched in cooperation with Medion, a company well known for its previous cooperations with Aldi. Since 2013 Thalia has sold Tolino e-readers.
