= Bremer Straßenbahn =

Logo of the Bremer Straßenbahn AG

Bremer Straßenbahn AG (translates from German as Bremen Tramways Corporation), often abbreviated BSAG, is the public transport provider for Bremen, Germany, offering tramway and bus services. As of 2020, BSAG operated 8 tram lines in Bremen, operating on 111.5 kilometres (69.3 mi) of route (down from 115.4 kilometres (71.7 mi) of route in 2013). It also operates 38 bus lines on 492.3 kilometres (305.9 mi) of route.

== See also ==
- List of town tramway systems in Germany
- Trams in Bremen
- Trams in Germany
