= Metzler =

Metzler is a surname. It may refer to:

- Alex Metzler (1903–1973), American baseball player
- Brenton Metzler, American producer
- Chris Metzler (born 1974), American filmmaker
- Jan Metzler (born 1981), German politician
- Jim Metzler (born 1951), American television and film actor
- John C. Metzler, Jr. (born 1947), superintendent of Arlington National Cemetery, US, son of John Sr
- John C. Metzler, Sr. (1909–1990), superintendent of Arlington National Cemetery
- Jost Metzler (1909–1975), German Corvette Captain in World War II
- Kurt Laurenz Metzler (1941–2024), Swiss sculptor
- Léon Metzler (1896–1930), Luxembourgian football player
- Lloyd Metzler (1913–1980), American economist
- Louis Metzler (1864–1929), American bookkeeper and politician
- Ruth Metzler (born 1964), Swiss politician
- Whitney Metzler (born 1978), American swimmer

== See also ==
- Neil Meitzler (1930–2009), American painter
