= Nicolai Riedel =

German philologist, author and editor (* 1952)

- Born: 17 October 1952 (age 73); Lübeck, West Germany
- Occupations: Philologist, author, and editor
- Years active: 1977–present
- Website: Nicolai Riedel (in German)

Nicolai Riedel (born 17 October 1952 in Lübeck) is a German philologist, author and an editor. Riedel worked for a long time as a research fellow in the library of the German Literature Archive in Marbach am Neckar. In addition, he is the author and editor of numerous bibliographical publications. These include works on Uwe Johnson, Ernst Jünger and Günter Kunert.

== Biography and work ==
Nicolai Riedel first attended the Neusprachliche Gymnasium (a secondary school specializing in modern languages) in Cologne-Porz, then the Gymnasium am Rittersberg in Kaiserslautern, where he also passed his Abitur (university entrance examination) with the Großes Latinum (advanced Latin certificate) in 1972. He then studied Modern German Literature and Philosophy at the University of Mannheim, completing his studies with the First State Examination in 1978/79. He also attended courses in Sociology and History concurrently. After his intermediate examination (1974), he worked as a research assistant at the Mannheim Leibniz Institute for the German Language (IdS) until autumn 1979, where he was primarily responsible for bibliographic research and editing. A Scholarship from the city of Mannheim helped him to build a research library. A stay of several months in France provided him with the opportunity to conceptually prepare his dissertation. It was here that he also established his first contacts with French German Studies. This was followed by academic teaching from 1980 to 1989 and his doctorate in modern German literature at the University of Passau. Between 1989 and 2017, he was a research fellow and head of the Collections and User Services department at the library of the German Literature Archive in Marbach. His responsibilities included the organization and description of special collections (libraries of poets and scholars, publishers' archives, and thematic and author-specific collections), inter-institutional interlibrary loan and stack logistics, on-site visits and appraisals of personal libraries, acquisition of scholarly literature in the humanities, and supervision of doctoral candidates, scholarship holders, and library interns. In 2018 and 2019, he worked part-time at the Literature Archive and was responsible for the Marbach Schiller Bibliography.

For many years, Riedel was co-editor of the literary magazine "Passauer Pegasus" and a member of the Mecklenburg Literature Society and the German Schiller Society.

Nicolai Riedel has lived in the baroque city of Ludwigsburg since 1989.

== Publications (selection) ==
=== Publications ===
- Untersuchungen zur internationalen Rezeption Uwe Johnsons. Olms, Hildesheim 1985, ISBN 978-3-487-07624-9.
- Uwe-Johnson-Bibliographie 1959–1998. Metzler, Stuttgart 1999, ISBN 978-3-476-01680-5.
- Ernst-Jünger-Bibliographie 1928–2002. Metzler, Stuttgart 2003, ISBN 978-3-476-01961-5.
- Internationale Günter-Kunert-Bibliographie 1947–2011. de Gruyter, Berlin 2012, ISBN 978-3-11-018935-3.
- Ernst-Jünger-Bibliographie 2003–2015. Metzler, Stuttgart 2016, ISBN 978-3-476-02665-1.
- Bibliographisches Handbuch der deutschsprachigen Lyrik 1945–2020. Metzler, Heidelberg 2023, ISBN 978-3-662-65460-6.
- Bibliographisches Handbuch deutschsprachiger Lyrik-Anthologien 1945–2024 Band 1. Metzler, Heidelberg 2025, (with Gudrun Wanek-Riedel), ISBN 978-3-662-72365-4.
- Bibliographisches Handbuch deutschsprachiger Lyrik-Anthologien 1945–2024 Band 2. Metzler, Heidelberg 2025, (with Gudrun Wanek-Riedel), ISBN 978-3-662-72365-4.

=== Publications (as editor) ===
- Erzähltechnik und Entfremdungsproblematik. MWA, Mannheim 1977.
- Uwe Johnsons Frühwerk im Spiegel der deutschsprachigen Literaturkritik. Bouvier, Bonn 1987.
- with Carsten Gansel: Internationales Uwe-Johnson-Forum. 10 Bände, Lang, Frankfurt/M. 1990–2006.
- with Gerhard Nebel „Alles Gefühl ist leiblich". Ein Stück Autobiographie, Deutsche Schillergesellschaft, Marbach am Neckar 2003, ISBN 978-3-933679-91-8.

=== Periodic publications ===
- with Herman Moens: Marbacher Schiller-Bibliographie. Internationales Referenzorgan zur Forschungs- und Wirkungsgeschichte. In: Jahrbuch der Deutschen Schillergesellschaft, 2006–2018 (13 updates).

=== Other works (selection) ===
- Numerous bibliographical articles in the periodical "Text + Kritik" and in the "KLG". Individual essays in scholarly collections.
