= Armin Steigenberger =

German poet and writer

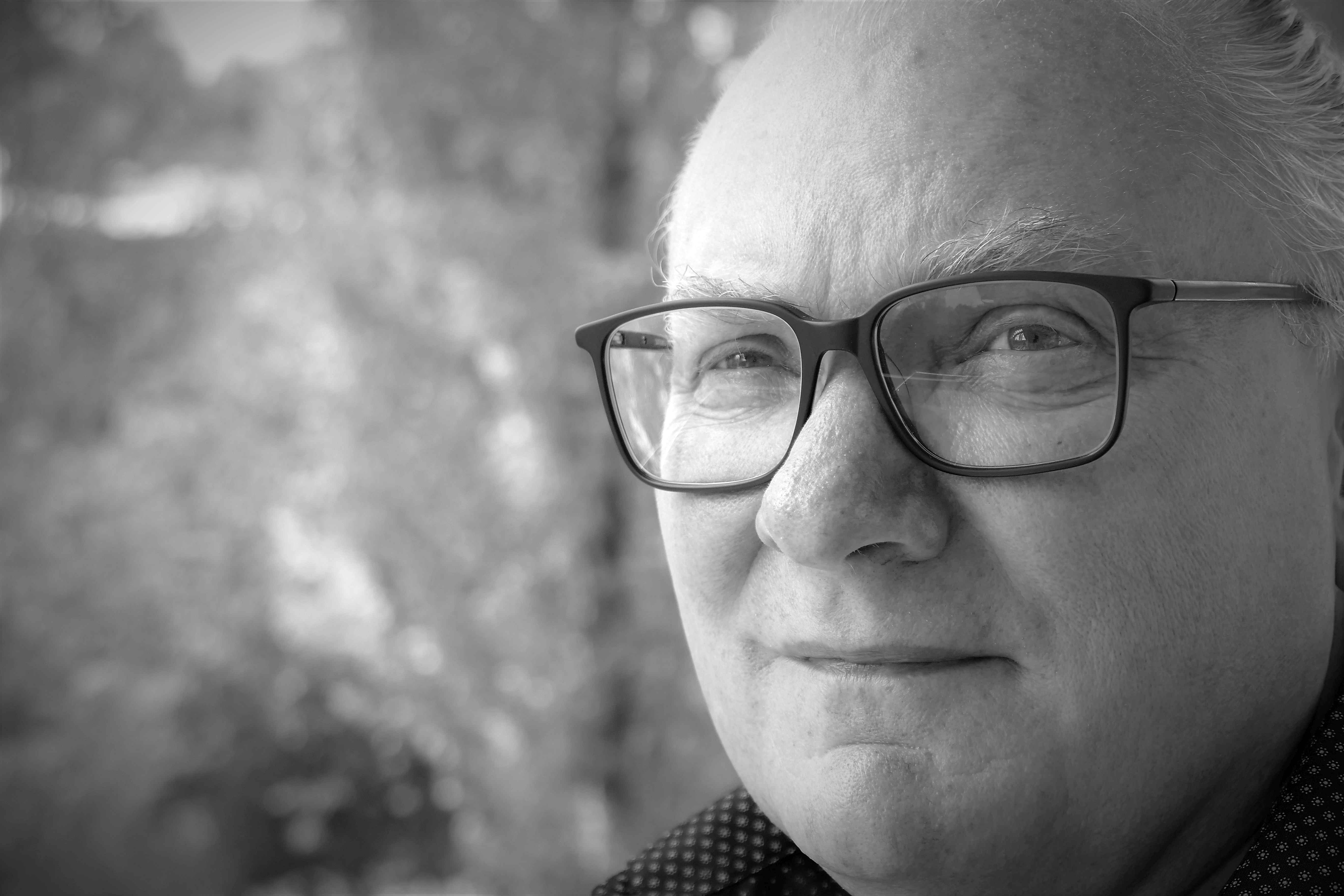
- Armin Steigenberger in 2022
- Born: 7 January 1965 (age 61); Nuremberg, Germany
- Education: Technical University of Munich
- Occupations: Poet; writer; editor
- Years active: 2002–present
- Spouse: Christel Steigenberger (m. 2000)

Armin Steigenberger (born 7 January 1965 in Nuremberg) is a German poet, novelist, writer, literary editor, and musician. At the end of the 1990s, he was chairman of the Münchner Literaturbüro. He won several literary awards including Irseer Pegasus in 2009.

== Life and work ==
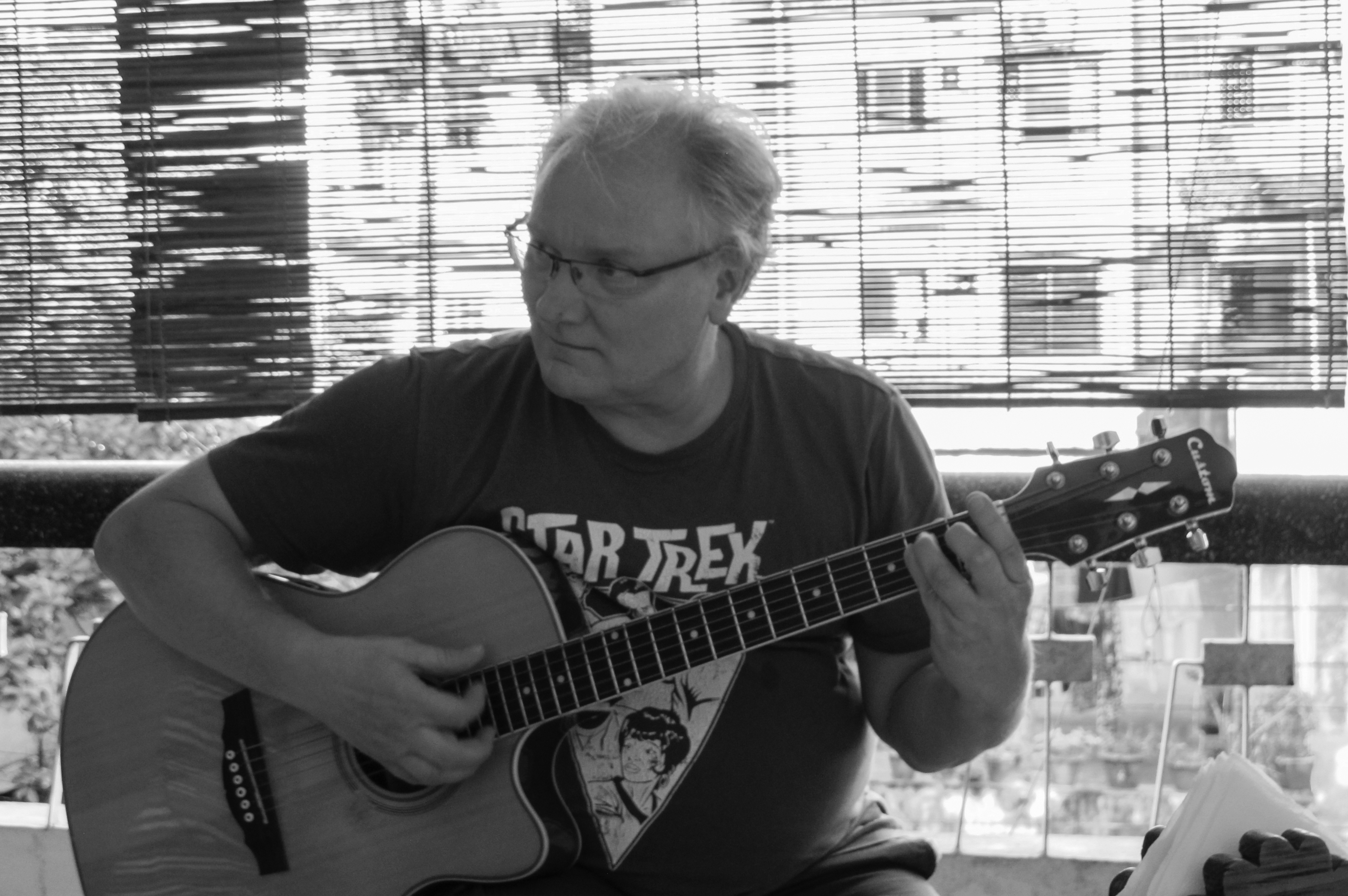
Steigenberger playing guitar at Bistaar, Chattogram in 2017.

Steigenberger studied architecture at Technical University of Munich and worked until 2000 in the same profession. Since then he has worked as a freelance and writing reviews and organizing reading and writing seminars. In addition, he moderates two radio broadcasts for LORA Munich and is co-editor of the literary magazine Außer.dem. He is a member of the poetry group Rhyme Free and was from 2008 to 2011 participant in the Darmstadt Text Workshop Kurt Drawert. Together with Karin Fellner, he is considered one of the driving forces in the development of a contemporary Munich lyric poetry scene. Steigenberger mainly writes poetry, but also published a novel and wrote plays. Numerous texts also appeared in literary journals (e.g. Das Gedicht, lauter niemand, NDL, Ostragehege) and anthologies (e.g. Jahrbuch der Lyrik in 2020, Versnetze).

Steigenberger moderated the one-hour radio program "Schöner Stottern" ("Better Stuttering"), from 2007 to 2015, together with Enrico Strathausen. The program offered information on stuttering, but above all on the social perception of stuttering and the associated exclusion. The program was perceived as a successful attempt to counteract social discrimination against stuttering people. The fact that both moderators themselves stuttered was a peculiarity and was considered a taboo because stuttering people would not normally have access to the radio and television media.

Steigenberger is married and lives in Munich.

== Bibliography ==
Title	In English	Year	Details	Ref.(s)
Fleck		2002	novel, Gangaroo, E-Book, Graz/Sydney ISBN 978-3-900530-36-5	
gebrauchsanweisung für ein vaterland	Instructions for Use for A Fatherland	2006	poems, Pop Verlag Ludwigsburg, OCLC 181581064	
die fortsetzung des glücks mit anderen mitteln	The Continuation of Happiness With Other Means	2014	with Mathias Jeschke, poems, Horlemann Verlag, Berlin, OCLC 879569904	
Planspiel	Business Game	2006	play	
das ist der abgesägte lauf der welt		2020	poems, Books on Demand ISBN 978-3-75195-074-9	

== Awards ==
- 2006 in the last selection round of the 3rd Drama Competition of the Alexander S. Onassis Foundation with the play Planspiel (Business Game)
- 2006 3rd Prize at dO!PEN Award
- 2009 1st prize at the 11th Irseer Pegasus
- 2013 2nd prize in the literature competition Stockstadt.
- 2015 Special Prize at the Book Fair in Ried, Stockstadt.
