= Christoph Leisten =

German teacher and writer (born 1960)

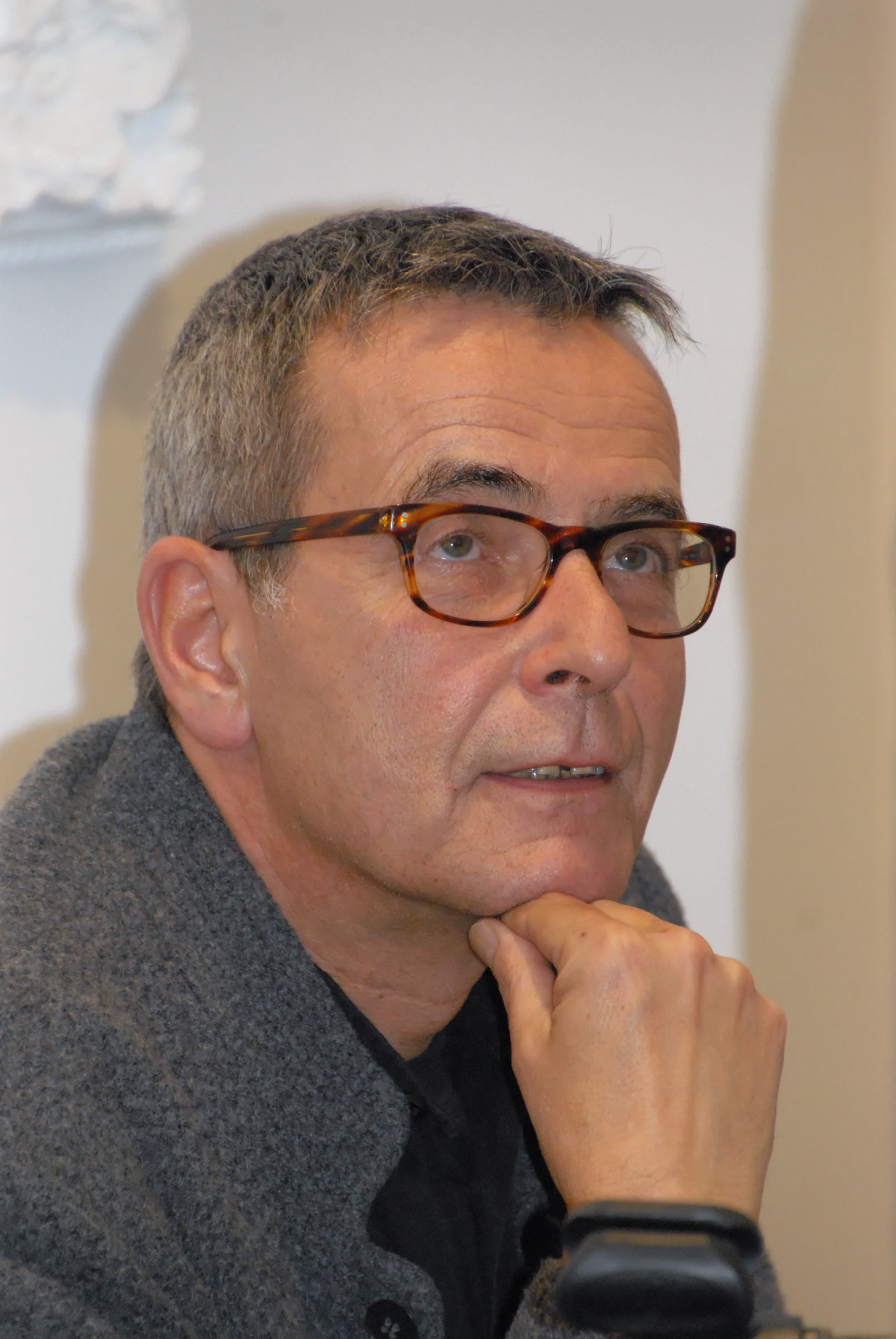
Leisten in 2015

Christoph Leisten (born 30 May 1960 in Geilenkirchen, North Rhine-Westphalia) is a German teacher and writer.

== Life and work ==
After graduating from high school, Christoph Leisten studied German and philosophy in Bonn. He made his debut in 2001 with the volume of poetry distant proximity. Leisten writes poetry, prose, and essays that have been published in anthologies and literary journals. He is co-editor of the Frankfurt literary magazine Zeichen & Wunder and organizer of the annual Euregional Poetry Daysin Würselen. Literary works by Leisten have been translated into Italian, Czech, and Arabic for various collections. The translation of his prose work Marrakech, Djemaa el Fna into Arabic in 2009 is characterized by the encounter with Maghrebian culture.

Christoph Leisten lives in Würselen in the Aachen city region and works as a high school teacher for German and philosophy at the Clara-Fey-Gymnasium in Schleiden.

== Works ==
- grand hotel tazi, Gedichte, Rimbaud Verlag, Aachen 2020
- Argana. Notizen aus Marokko, Rimbaud Verlag, Aachen 2016.
- bis zur schwerelosigkeit, Gedichte, Rimbaud Verlag, Aachen 2010.
- der mond vergebens. Gedichte aus zehn Jahren, Rimbaud Verlag, Aachen 2006.
- Marrakesch, Djemaa el Fna, Rimbaud Verlag, Aachen 2005 (3. Aufl. 2013).
- in diesem licht, Gedichte, Rimbaud Verlag, Aachen 2003.
- Entfernte Nähe, Gedichte, 2001

=== Anthologies and literary journals (selection) ===
- Anton G. Leitner (ed.), Die Bienen halten die Uhren auf. Naturgedichte, Reclam Verlag, Ditzingen 2020.
- Anton G. Leitner & Christoph Leisten (ed.), DAS GEDICHT 27. Dichter an die Natur. AGL-Verlag, Weßling 2019.
- Anton G. Leitner (ed.), Der Himmel von morgen. Gedichte über Gott und die Welt, Reclam Verlag, Ditzingen 2018.
- Bernhard Albers (ed.), Die Welt kennt keine Poesie. 100 Gedichte von 100 Autoren, Rimbaud Verlag, Aachen 2015.
- Christoph Buchwald & Nora Gomringer (ed.), Jahrbuch der Lyrik 2015, DVA, München 2015.
- Fouad EL-Auwad (ed.), Die Kerze brennt noch, Edition Lyrik-Salon spezial, Aachen 2015.
- Jürgen Nendza & Hajo Steinert (eds.), Stadtlandfluss. 111 Dichterinnen und Dichter aus Nordrhein-Westfalen, Lilienfeld Verlag, Düsseldorf 2014.
- Christoph Buchwald & Jan Wagner (eds.): Jahrbuch der Lyrik 2013, DVA, München 2013.
- Karl Otto Conrady (ed.): Der Große Conrady. Das Buch deutscher Gedichte. Von den Anfängen bis zur Gegenwart, Artemis & Winkler, Düsseldorf 2008.
- Axel Kutsch (ed.): Versnetze. Deutschsprachige Lyrik der Gegenwart. Bände 1 - 13, Verlag Ralf Liebe, Weilerswist 2008–2020.
- Shafiq Naz: Der deutsche Lyrikkalender 2010/2011/2012/2013. Jeder Tag ein Gedicht, alhambra publishing, B-Bertem 2009 - 2012.
- Theo Breuer (ed.): NordWestSüdOst. Gedichte von Zeitgenossen, Edition YE, Sistig/Eifel 2003.
- Axel Kutsch (ed.): Zeit. Wort. Deutschsprachige Lyrik der Gegenwart, Verlag Ralf Liebe, Weilerswist 2003.
- Theo Breuer (ed.): 2 0 0 2, Edition YE, Sistig/Eifel 2002.
- Journals: die horen, Faltblatt, Das Gedicht, Muschelhaufen u. a.

== Literature ==
- Theo Breuer: Christoph Leisten. In: T.B.: Kiesel & Kastanie. Von neuen Gedichten und Geschichten, Sistig/Eifel: Edition YE 2008.
- Christa Karpenstein-Essbach: Marrakesch als Identitätsform (zu Canetti, Fichte und Leisten). In: Thomas Klinkert (Hrsg.): Migration et Identité. Freiburg i. Brsg./Berlin: Rombach Verlag 2014.
- Christoph Leisten. In: Bernhard Albers (Hrsg.): Wir Außenseiter. 33 Jahre Rimbaud Verlag. Aachen: Rimbaud Verlag 2015.
- Jürgen Nelles: Christoph Leisten. In: Kritisches Lexikon zur deutschsprachigen Gegenwartsliteratur (KLG), 124. Nachlieferung (Fortsetzungswerk 1978 ff.). München: Edition Text und Kritik 2019, ISBN 978-3-86916-548-6.
