= Kerstin Becker =

German writer and poet (born 1969)

Kerstin Becker (born 14 March 1969 in Frankenberg, East Germany) is a German writer and poet.

== Work and life ==
Kerstin Becker was raised in Moosheim und Hainichen in Saxony. She worked as a typesetter and cemetery florist amongst others. In the late 1980s, Becker was under surveillance by the authorities of the GDR and arrests were carried out due to so-called "anti-state actions". In the late 1990s, Becker took courses in creative writing. Since 2001, she works as a freelance writer, editor and lector. She mainly writes poems and children's books. Until 2019, she was also co-editor of the Dresden-based literary magazine Ostragehege.

Becker's poetry has been published in numerous literary magazines and anthologies, nationally as well as internationally. Her poems have been translated into several languages, including American English, Czech, Serbian and Arabic. In collaboration with Martina Lisa, Becker translated a poetry collection by Czech poet Petr Hruška into German (Irgendwohin nach Haus, 2019).

For her poetry, Becker has received numerous awards. In 2022, she was awarded the honorary award of the Deutsche Schillerstiftung.

Kerstin Becker has two children and lives in Dresden.

== Critical reception ==
In 2016, Becker's poetry collection Biestmilch (Beastmilk) was one of the Literaturhaus Berlin's Poetry Books of the Year.

Becker's collection Das gesamte hungrige Dunkel ringsum (The Entire Hungry Darkness Surrounding) has received a recommendation by Kerstin Preiwuß in the context of the poetry recommendations of the Deutsche Akademie für Sprache und Dichtung, the Stiftung Lyrik Kabinett (Poetry Cabinet Foundation) Munich and the Haus für Poesie (House for Poetry) Berlin in 2022:

"Diese Gedichte halten sich an ihren Gegenstand. Verfahren ungeschönt und erhöhen nichts, vor allem nicht sich. (...) Letztlich geht es um Grundlegendes, das Überlebenssystem zu begreifen und wie dieses Wissen zutage tritt. (These poems stick to their subject. They proceed unadorned and do not exaggerate anything, especially not themselves. (...) Ultimately, it's about the fundamentals of understanding the survival system and how this knowledge can be achieved.)" – Kerstin Preiwuß

Beate Tröger calls the above-mentioned recommendation "a well-earned decision (eine sehr verdiente Entscheidung)" stating that the collection "measures a considerable spectrum of pain and beauty (vermisst ein beträchtliches Schmerz- und Schönheitsspektrum): The voice that speaks in this collection finds words for many things that hurt, that make you angry, that are true and that cannot be changed. With their humour, the poems are sometimes flamboyantly luminous (...), in their attentiveness, they are virtually reliably affectionate." (Die Stimme, die in diesem Band spricht, findet Worte für vieles von dem, was weh tut, was wütend macht, was wahr ist und was unabänderlich. In ihrer Komik sind die Gedichte hin und wieder grell leuchtend (...), in ihrer Zugewandtheit sind sie geradezu verlässlich zärtlich)."

In 2023, Becker's poem "Erwacht" was included in the Frankfurter Anthologie of the Frankfurter Allgemeine Zeitung by Hubert Spiegel. In his review, he cites the first four verses of the poem and states: "The magical moment when a consciousness awakens because a new day has begun has rarely been described more beautifully, sensuously and concisely than by Kerstin Becker (Der magische Moment, wenn ein Bewusstsein erwacht, weil ein neuer Tag begonnen hat, ist selten schöner, sinnlicher und prägnanter beschrieben worden als von Kerstin Becker)".

== Publications (selection) ==
- Der wilde Löwe Samosai. Mit lustigen Geschichten & Gedichten durch das Jahr. Pro Business, Berlin 2005, ISBN 978-3-939000-22-8
- Die Steinzeit. Texte und Gedichte. Junker Verlag, Rheinau 2011.
- Fasernackte Verse. Gedichte. Fixpoetry Verlag, Hamburg 2012, ISBN 978-3-942890-11-3
- Biestmilch. Gedichte. edition AZUR, Dresden 2016, ISBN 978-3-942375-23-8
- Das gesamte hungrige Dunkel ringsum. Gedichte. edition AZUR, Dresden 2022, ISBN 978-3-942375-55-9

== Awards (selection) ==
- 2005 Poetenladen debut competition (2. prize / ex aequo with Anja Kampmann)
- 2006 Poetry prize of the Freier Deutscher Autorenverband
- 2009 Scholarship of the Kulturstiftung Sachsen (Denkmalschmiede Höfgen)
- 2013 Irseer Pegasus (2. prize)
- 2014 Munich Poetry Prize (2. prize)
- 2014 Scholarship of the Kulturstiftung Sachsen (AT HOME GALLERY Šamorín)
- 2014 Merano Poetry Prize (finalist)
- 2014 Dresdner Lyrikpreis (finalist)
- 2015 Scholarship of the Amt für Kultur und Denkmalschutz Dresden
- 2016 Biestmilch (Beastmilk) is elected one of the Poetry Books of the Year by the Literaturhaus Berlin
- 2019 Scholarship of the Künstlerhaus Edenkoben
- 2019 Scholarship of the foundation Künstlerdorf Schöppingen
- 2022 Honorary award of the Deutsche Schillerstiftung
