= Die Horen =

Die Horen may refer to:

- Die Horen (Morawietz), German literary and art journal published from 1955
- Die Horen (Schiller), German literary journal published from 1795 to 1797
