= Anton G. Leitner =

German writer and publisher

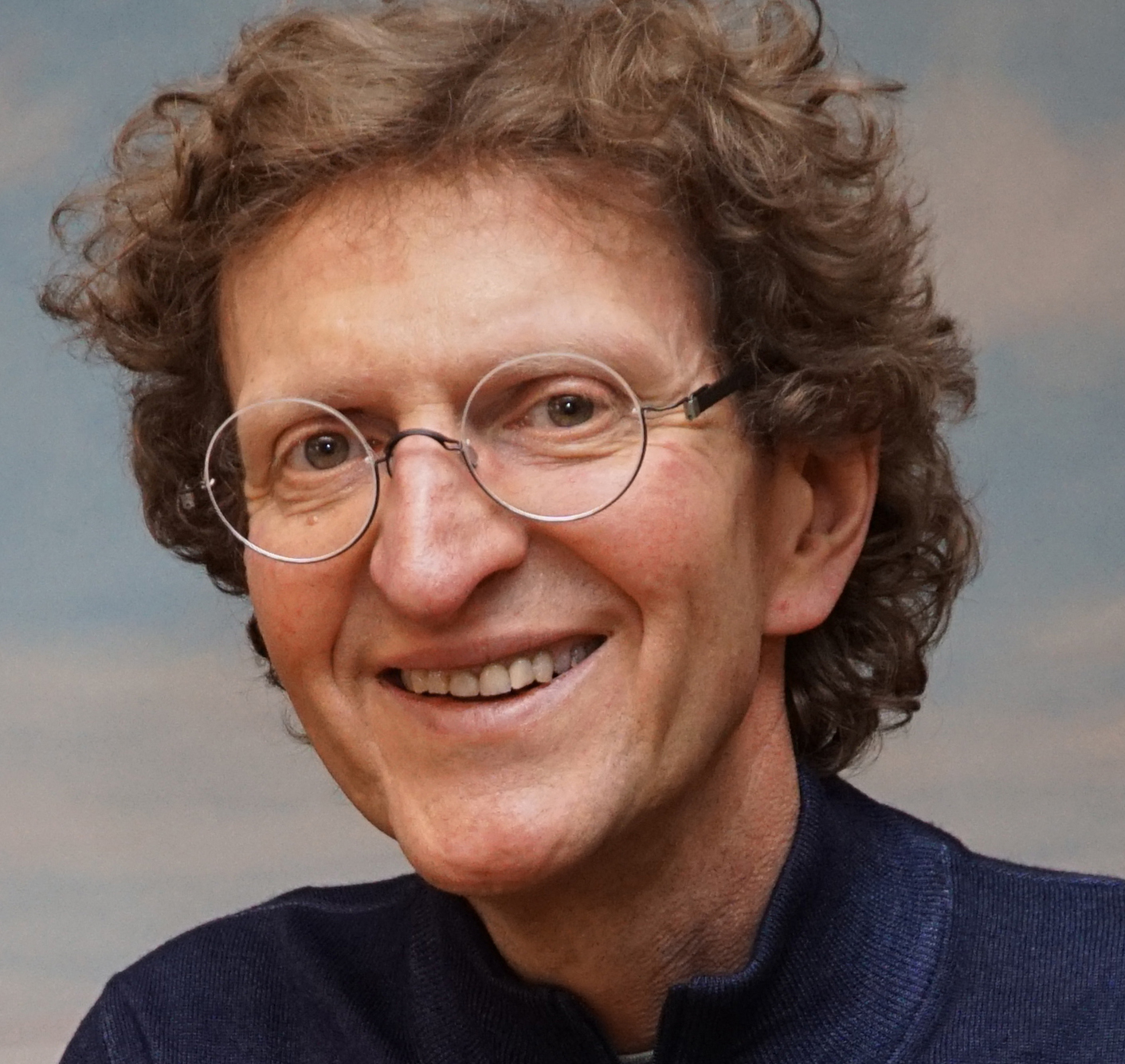
Anton G. Leitner, 2020

Anton G. Leitner (born 16 June 1961) is a German writer and publisher.

He has also gained a widespread reputation as an editor, reciter, and organizer of literary events. Since 1980, Leitner edited over 40 anthologies for major publishers in the German language, such as Artemis & Winkler, dtv, dtv/Hanser, Eichborn Lido, Goldmann, and Reclam. He is the co-founder and editor-in-chief of the poetry magazine DAS GEDICHT, which has been published annually since 1993.

Although he specializes on poetry, Leitner is also the author of short stories, essays, as well as literary critique and reviews. Additionally, he has published children's books and audiobooks. He has been instrumental in raising public awareness for the art form since the early 80s and has concentrated his efforts on fostering a broad environment for poetry that crosses cultural and intergenerational boundaries. In doing so, he has not shied away from controversy and critical public debate on the role of poetry within society.

Leitner is co-founder of PEN Berlin and member of PEN International as well as Poets of the Planet (PoP).

== Life ==
Leitner was born in Munich. After graduating in 1981 from the Wittelsbacher-Gymnasium in Munich (a secondary school with a strong humanistic tradition), he studied law and philosophy from 1982 to 1988 at LMU Munich. Having attained his bar examination in 1989, he completed his legal clerkship at the Oberlandesgericht (Higher Regional Court) Munich from 1990–1993. Since 1993, he lives and works professionally as an author, critic, editor, and publisher in Weßling (County of Starnberg), because "he prefers dealing with poems rather than sitting around at courts." Early on, as a high school student, Leitner published, parallel to his childhood friend Helmut Krausser, private prints, which already indicated a remarkable talent in the realization of editorial and publishing projects, as his early books Füllhorn and Nachböen (1980/1981) show.

== Initiative of Young Authors ==
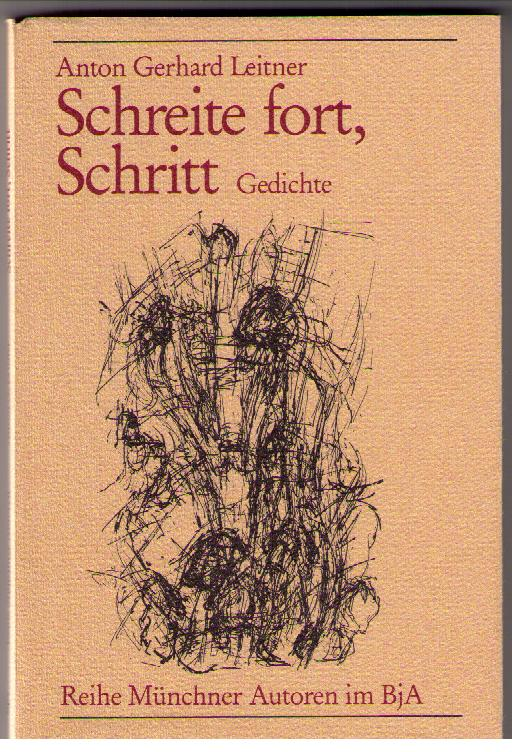
Cover: Schreite fort, Schritt (1986), illustrations by Michael Gattnarzik

In the early 80s, he founded the Initiative of Young Authors (IJA German: "Initiative Junger Autoren") together with Friedrich Ani, Michael Lentz, Nicola Bardola, and others. He was the chairman of the organization until 1991. Under Leitner's aegis, the IJA organized the Festival Interactions / "Young Literature Days" ("Tage junger Literatur") in cooperation with IBM-Germany at the Gasteig Cultural Center in 1988. It remains to this day one of the largest literary festivals in the Bavarian capital of Munich. The Tagesspiegel, amused by the young and independent organization, wrote: "This young movement does not exhaust its effort in intimate orange tea readings." One important platform within the IJA was the Munich-based publication, Der Zettel, in which many now widely celebrated writers published their first poems and have frequently been flanked by international authors, such as Vladimir Sorokin. Leitner's personal reading style has been influenced by the many public performances within the ranks of the Initiative. During his enrollment as a law student, he already edited poetry and prose focused on aspiring authors for Goldmann and was member of the jury for the national competition "Schüler schreiben" at the "Conference of Young Authors" in Berlin.

== Poetry ==
Currently, 24 volumes of poems stand out in Leitner's larger contribution to the art form, which also includes over 40 poetry anthologies, as well as more than 30 issues of the magazine DAS GEDICHT. His poems have also been featured in magazines, newspapers, television and radio broadcasts (e.g. Brigitte, mare, Süddeutsche Zeitung, Die Zeit, Bayerischer Rundfunk, etc.). Many of his poems have been included in anthologies, focusing on contemporary poetry in German. Leitner's poetic work has always stood in critical relation to his editorial work, which not only informs and influences his work as an author, but also places his own poetry in a unique situation in terms of aesthetic production, as various commentators have noted. While attempting to locate Anton G. Leitner's persona within the literary landscape of contemporary poetry in 1986, Manfred Lange wrote: "He's hard to classify, and that makes him likeable. He doesn't give you ready-to-use worldviews, but thoughts, perspectives, and a strong plea for new departures."

=== "So! Cease / Hearing / The silence of / things." Poetry as a Necessitating Breaking Point ===
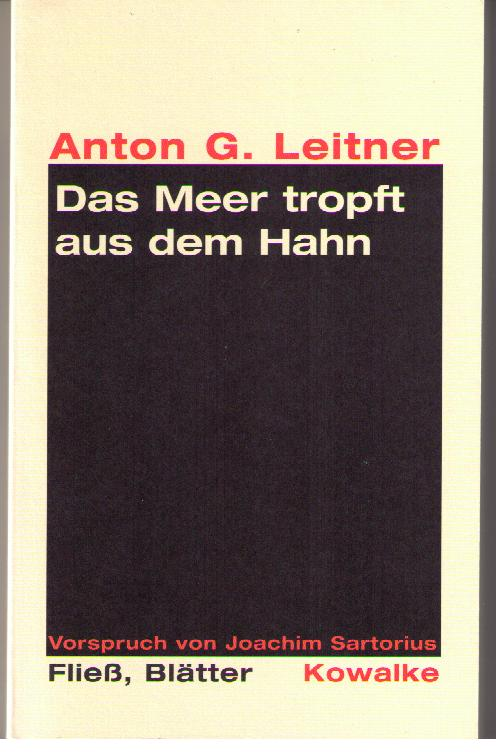
Cover: Das Meer tropft aus dem Hahn (2001)

Various critics have placed Leitner's poetic approach at a gap between modernism and postmodernism. The Süddeutsche Zeitung said that in Leitner's work "what is happing between the words, is a conquest of new territories:" in a lingually recorded terrain, "large spaces emerge amongst the seemingly trusted and established networks." His poetry, critics say, captures reality in fragments that are broken in their apprehension, but do not simply remain as scattered pieces, "as Leitner's technique of fragmentation along with his steady shifts in pitch, tone, and perspective are embedded in a comprehensive design." The immediate evidence of his imagery, displayed in his verse, has been noted by his admirers as well as his rivals. In the weekly newspaper based in Hamburg, Die Zeit, Alexander Nitzberg wrote: "The verbal simulacrum/Blendwerk frequently only frames sentences full of serenity and poetry." What Nitzberg, as well as, for example, Joachim Sartorius, have discovered to be characteristic of Leitner's work is a form of poetry that balances the ambiguity inherent in outward intelligibility and inward magic. With Leitner, the poet, "the art of the enjambment achieves a height that fringes on charlatanry" (Nitzberg). Nitzberg furthermore remarks that Leitner does not show us "smoothly rippling oceanic waves, but tiny painful drops."

=== Style and technique ===
Leitner sabotages conventional ways of verse construction by a systematic usage of the enjambment, whereby he attains a multiple coding of his lines with meaning. Steffen Jacobs, for example, highlighted this procedure during a discussion of Leitner's poem Abends, immer in Die Welt: "Anton G. Leitner's poem Abends, immer offers interesting material exemplifying an extreme form of the enjambment: here the line breaks frequently give the poem an entirely new direction. In the beginning, Leitner's poem seems to bring us into a car: 'Preferably, // he lay / obliquely. She // stands up.' A dialog full of tensions may be implied here, but also a change of position – of the erotic type." By dramatically "shattering the relations of sentences and individual words" in his poems, he creates the effect of estrangement, the conventional usage of language and images within everyday language is opened to new interpretations. In combination with an extremely condensed language, Leitner's poetic approach has proven to be exceptionally productive in bringing contemporary phenomena into the domains of verse: "His verse mimics the high velocity of contemporary experience in the meters of a new age – no word, no syllable, no character too much." "Leitner relentlessly works with chiastic and superimposed semantic vectors that are capable of producing paradoxical and bamboozling effects. He frequently mixes word families, crosses through boundaries of word fields, splices word compounds, contrives unusual sequences of associations, and shatters those which we might expect."

=== Poetry as cultural critique ===
Relatively early in his career, the literary scholar Ulrich Johannes Beil observed the specific form of critique within Leitner's verse: "By way of his language, Leitner creates the resistance that reality is no longer able to offer him." In his review entitled "Love and social critique," Fritz Deppert has verified that observation while exploring Leitner's collection of poems "Schreite fort, Schritt." Leitner, says Lutz Rathenow in an analysis of the poem Angel in Die Welt, often varies the motif of uncertainty: "Anton G. Leitner goes beyond that: and what is there to do, when angels no longer know what they are and what their mission is? In this slender poem of no more than 27 words, angels are, above all, exhausted. The author is able to place each word with such ambiguity that the poem raises more questions than answers." While some commentators capitulate in the face of a supposed "pessimism," others accentuate the notion of a "cynical reason:"

"Is Leitner working on a style of poetry that is something like a cynical reason? Maybe […]. We are confronted with poems that are reminiscent of Haikus, of Leitner's models G. Ungaretti, Giannis Ritsos, J. R. Jimenez, and of the verse of Karl Krolow, the master of zero-gravity. Some of these delicate poems seem a bit lost and displaced amongst other pieces that have been hammered out with the sledgehammer. The poem, CIRCUMNAVIGATING THE LITTLE WORLD (German: KLEINE WELT RUNDE), for instance, reads: 'Everything, I need / around me: you, I mean you / are the hinge but you swing / in circles with me.' At the same time, these poems are testimony to the fact that it is indeed possible to gain ground for delicate literary forms, despite the overpowering force of the talk show culture: to gain terrain for the 'wisdom / of a melon,' to gain a language able to call upon the antiquity of Catullus and Propertius– to discover niches here and there in which verses like these are possible: 'My house / is dark / because it is / built / on shadows.'"

The mode of critique evident in Leitner's poetry, which operates with a subjectivity that is well aware of its post-modern loss of normative frameworks, places his poetry in close proximity with the spirit of philosophical existentialism. Thomas Krüger has commented on the battle for authenticity documented in Leitner's work in a review published in Die Horen: "[Leitner's search for authenticity] is refracted in evident fact that in an environment dominated by market capitalism, political disorientation, and the vane apostasy of product labels, there is no authentic existence – not even in the believable simulacrum called utopia."

=== Humor – irony – parody ===
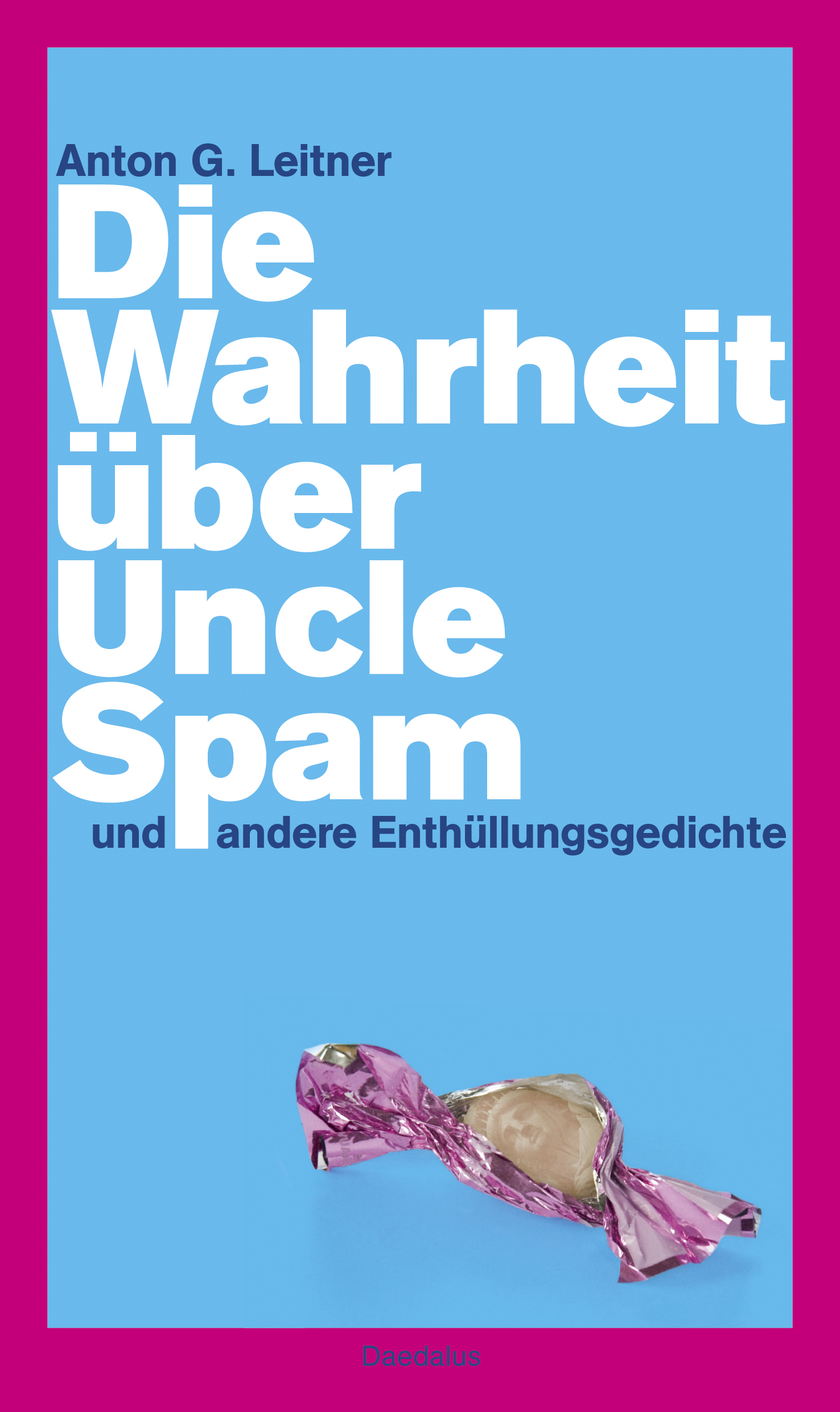
Cover: Die Wahrheit über Uncle Spam (2011)

Contrary to the opinions of some of his enemies, who never tire to credit Leitner's poetry with supposed incomprehensibility, other commentators – such as the Süddeutsche Zeitung – have given quite different assessments of his work. With respect to his poetry collection The Truth about Uncle Spam (German: Die Wahrheit über Uncle Spam), critics from that newspaper wrote: "[his verse] is playfully light and aerial […] because he does not trust in false claims to intellectual depth, his miniatures are wonderful reads." While earlier in his career, he was called "pessimistic," critics such as Salli Sallmann have recently honored him with the title of Jokester: "Leitner wants to unearth the madness and idiocy that surrounds us every day, but he does so playfully, without any kind of moralistic resentment or invectives." Numerous critics have remarked on Leitner's enlightened irony.[33][34] In a review of Der digitale Hai ist high (German for The Digital Shark is High), Peter Kapp wrote in the Rheinische Post: "by means of hearty verbal wit and twisted word play, Leitner incites a lust for poetry." Leitner does not hide behind fictions of seriousness: "the publisher and publicist [Leitner] does not care very much for the widely held notion that poetry is something for quiet retreats. He thinks that poetry is part of everyday life and should be fun." In his preface to Der digitale Hai ist high Günter Kunert wrote, "It's rare that a poet brings together three special qualities in his personality, as in the case of Anton G. Leitner. That guy has a feeling for the language; he has a lust for the language; he's obsessed with sex—where else do these three qualities come together? Humor, wit, and common sense. This is a mixture that can rarely be found in German poetry."

Leitner's publication, Schnablgwax. Bairisches Verskabarett (2016), a collection of narrative poetry, resumes the stylistic devices of caricature and humor. By writing in Upper Bavarian dialect the author reconnects with his linguistic roots. Sabine Zaplin acknowledges that Leitner shares "the lust for provocation, the unerring sense for ambiguity and a fine-tuned antenna for the interstices of language" with Georg Queri, a renowned Bavarian author well known for his authentic presentation of Bavarian dialect and the people of Old Bavaria. Rudolf Siegl of MUH. Bayerische Aspekte emphasizes that the usage of dialect corresponds well with the content of Leitner's poetry: "The Bavarian language flows round and smooth, interlaced by onomatopoeia and infused with anarchy. Observations of everyday life are formed into an accurate portrait of Bavarian nature, sometimes coarse, sometimes profound, sometimes pigheaded, but always laid-back – this is indeed how Upper Bavarians sound."

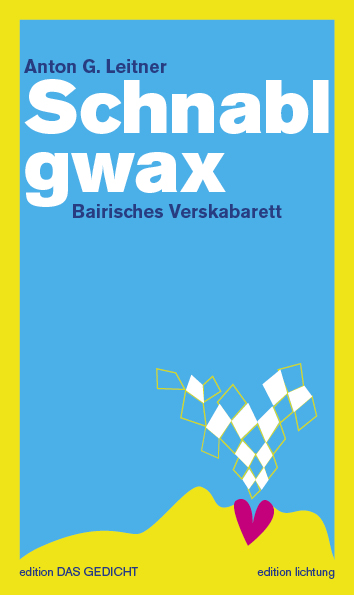
Cover: Schnablgwax (2016)

=== Poetry in the public sphere ===
Not only around the person of Anton G. Leitner, but particularly in the flow of his work does poetry become the center of public debate, so that Salli Sallmann commented in the RBB cultural program while discussing Leitner's poetry book, Die Wahrheit über Uncle Spam (German: The Truth about Uncle Spam): "He is somebody who restlessly fights for the public awareness of the literary genre." The openness of Leitner's verse makes it possible that "it does not transform into pretentious verse, providing solitary pleasures for a few like-minded souls, but rather, he attempts at developing verse that is capable of reaching a wider public." It is precisely this characteristic of his poetry—it's acceptability and accessibility—which transforms Leitner's person to a crystallization point for public debates on the role of poetry within society. "While many contemporary poets feebly flail their limbs on dry land, Leitner swims sleekly through a turbulent sea of language." Consequently, his motifs and thematic concepts are developed in view of a real-reader situation that includes—but also searches beyond—academic special interest groups. His verse aims at reaching a wide public and achieves just this. He begins with a prying curiosity. "We all should support independent and committed publishers. Only curious readers looking forward to these books can help us survive, for poetry mainly thrives on the commitment of enthusiastic publishers." Leitner does not write with his back to the audience, but skillfully involves "poetry into daily communicative processes." Many poets, some of whom have entirely resigned from the necessity of finding an audience, oppose the intentional structure inherent in the compositional principle advocated by Leitner. The debate on a pluralistic public/governmental support of poetry, initiated by Axel Kutsch in 2011, showed that clearly. While some poets and publishers became angry over Kutsch's criticism of badly planned public endowments of poetry, Leitner defended Kutsch saying that "some comments (by contemporary poets) sound as though they have been written by moody children whose allowances have been threatened to be cut by their fatherland." Leitner highlighted in this debate that poetry, which is supposed to be publicly funded, ought to be accessible to the public as well; otherwise, it should be privately financed. Thus the debate was not generally about governmental subsidies for the arts, in particular for literature. Instead, in Leitner's eyes, it was a debate on the conditions of and for aesthetic production. If a poet is to be funded by the state out of tax-payer resources, then such poets should accept the fact that it is "not poetry that is providing for their material needs, but rather subsidies and prize money, which are often provided from tax-payer money."

== Publishing and editing ==
Since 1980, Leitner edited more than 40 anthologies for prominent German publishers, including Artemis & Winkler, dtv, dtv/Hanser, Goldmann, and Reclam. He was the editor of the poetry series in the edition Chrismon from 2007/2008. In the Eichborn Verlag, his audio book was published under the title Herzenspoesie, and includes love poems from Goethe, Heine, Klabund, Wedekind, and Gernhardt.

Anton G. Leitner's work as a publisher has shaped the face of German editing practice with respect to poetry. He has encouraged a fresh and uninhibited style in dealing with poetry that is aimed at a general audience. Hanns-Josef Ortheil has confirmed this in a review of Leitner's anthology Feuer, Wasser, Luft & Erde (German: Fire, Water, Air & Earth): "Looking at this anthology, I can envision a new beginning for poetry." He further said that Leitner has found an appropriate balance between contemporary poetry and poetry of past periods. "At the same time," says Ortheil, "he identified texts that make an interesting selection." The critic Franz Schuh wrote in Die Zeit: "I cannot possibly fathom a better selection."

Noteworthy is Leitner's innovative energy in constituting poetic formats by centering a body of texts around a common principle – for example, his anthology SMS-Lyrik, on poetry in the text message format (SMS: 170 characters per message) or texts associated with the cultural sphere of Bavaria in Ois is Easy. In such projects, Leitner's editorial work has defined many formal parameters in the art form under real market conditions. In its review of the Bavarian anthology Ois is Easy, the Bayerischer Rundfunk said: "Here's a collection of texts from Bavaria, in many registers, in High German and in Dialect, from every cultural and linguistic region of Bavaria. The poets lined up in this anthology range from Friedrich Ani to Hans Magnus Enzensberger, Michael Krüger, Reiner Kunze, and many more to Ludwig Steinherr. This book is a fresh sounding out of the present-day literary scene in Bavaria."

For Leitner, the poetic anthology is an editorial project that by nature always remains inconclusive, but still must be constantly undertaken. The very form of the anthology shapes literary history, in that it shows which texts are able to hold their position with a larger audience over a longer period of time. In this sense, the anthology in Leitner's view is an "open project."

== DAS GEDICHT. Zeitschrift für Lyrik, Essay und Kritik ==
In 1993, Anton G. Leitner and Ludwig Steinherr founded the literary magazine DAS GEDICHT, which is today one of the largest literary magazine exclusively dedicated to poetry. From 1994 to 2007 as well as from 2020 to 2022 he was its sole editor. Between 2008 and 2019 as well as 2023 and 2025, Leitner has invited a new co-editor each year. The magazine is published annually. It ranks among the most sold literary magazines in the German language. On November 7, 2024, the Cultural Committee of the Munich City Council (Kulturausschuss des Münchner Stadtrats) unanimously decided to purchase Anton G. Leitner's literary estate and archives (Initiative of Young Authors, publisher's archive "Das Gedicht") for the Monacensia Literary Archive of the City of Munich in the Hildebrandhaus. The agreed purchase price is undisclosed.

== Awards ==
- 1996: AusLese, Cultural Prize of the Stiftung Lesen
- 1997: Victor Otto Stomps-Prize
- 1999: Kogge-Förderpreis of the City of Minden
- 2001: Kulturförderpreis, Landkreis Starnberg
- 2015: Bayerischer Poetentaler, Cultural Prize of the Southern German literary association Münchner Turmschreiber
- 2016: Tassilo-Preis, Cultural Prize of the Süddeutsche Zeitung
- 2022: Deutscher Verlagspreis
- 2022: Verlagsprämie des Freistaats Bayern
- 2023: Deutscher Verlagspreis
- 2023/24: Alexander Sacher Masoch-Preis, Literaturhaus Wien
- 2026: Deutscher Verlagspreis

== Selected works ==
=== As author ===
==== Poetry ====
- Schreite fort, Schritt. Gedichte. Bundesring junger Autoren (BjA), Aachen 1986, ISBN 3-925638-03-2.
- Kleine Welt Runde (Edition Lyrik; Bd. 4). Landpresse, Weilerswist 1994, ISBN 3-930137-20-8.
- Bild Schirm schneit, roter Stich. Einhundert ausgewählte Gedichte. Landpresse, Weilerswist 1997, ISBN 3-930137-53-4.
- Das Meer tropft aus dem Hahn. Fließ, Blätter. 1998-2001. Lyrikedition 2000, München 2002, ISBN 3-935877-14-5 (Nachdr. d. Ausg. Berlin 2001).
- Der digitale Hai ist high. Oder Die Gesänge eines gefischten Fischers. Lyrikedition 2000, München 2004, ISBN 3-86520-052-4.
- Im Glas tickt der Sand. Echtzeitgedichte 1980 bis 2005. Edition lichtung, Viechtach 2006, ISBN 3-929517-75-2.
- Ei für zwei. Gedichtbilderbuch. Verlag Sankt Michaelsbund, München 2011, ISBN 978-3-939905-81-3 (illustriert von Peter Boerboom und Paula und Carola Vogt).
- Die Wahrheit über Uncle Spam und andere Enthüllungsgedichte. Daedalus Verlag, Münster 2011, ISBN 978-3-89126-192-7.
- Kopf. Bahnhof. Gedichte von Anton G. Leitner. Bilder von Alfred Wäspi. Carl-Walter Kottnik, Hamburg 2013, no ISBN.
- So a Gschiss. Bairisches Schnablgwax. Carl-Walter Kottnik, Hamburg 2015, no ISBN.
- Schnablgwax. Bairisches Verskabarett. Lichtung Verlag / Anton G. Leitner Verlag, Viechtach / Weßling 2016, ISBN 978-3-929433-27-2 (Print) / ISBN 978-3-929433-28-9 (E-Book) / ISBN 978-3-929433-34-0 (Hörbuch).
- Wadlbeissn. Zupackende Verse. Volk Verlag, München 2021, ISBN 978-3-86222-352-7.
- Vater, unser See wartet auf dich. Erinnerungsstücke und nachgerufene Verse. edition Das Gedicht, Weßling 2023, ISBN 978-3-929433-39-5.
- Spät öffnet sich das Licht. Ein Leben in Gedichten - Retrospektive 1980 bis 2025, edition Das Gedicht, Weßling 2026, ISBN 978-3-929433-41-8.

==== Prose ====
- Still Leben Ohne Dichter. Erzählung. Verlag Kowalke, Berlin 1997, ISBN 3-932191-05-6.

==== Children's Literature ====
- Napoleons erster Fall. Eine Geschichte (Pixi-Bücher; 1200). Carlsen, Hamburg 2003, ISBN 3-551-05739-7 (illustrations by Jörg Hülsmann).

==== Translations ====
- Selected Poems 1981–2015. Übersetzungen ins Englische von Richard Dove, Paul-Henri Campbell, Anatoly Kudryavitsky und Yulia Kudryavitskaya, Survision Books, Dublin 2018, ISBN 978-1-9995903-8-3.
- voix en plein trafic / Stimmen im Verkehr. Übersetzung ins Französische von Joël Vincent, Alidades | collection Bilingues, Thonon-les-Bains 2020, ISBN 978-2-919376-71-1.
- Lueur d’Espoir / Hoffnungsschimmer. Übersetzungen ins Französische von Joël Vincent, Vibration Éditions, Plonévez-Porzay 2025, ISBN 978-2-493992-08-6.
- Wohin die Reise gehen könnte. Lyrik deutsch-arabisch. Übersetzungen ins Arabische von Fouad EL-Auwad, Reihe Lyrik-Salon Spezial bei Books on Demand, Norderstedt 2023, ISBN 978-3-7578-1550-9.

=== As editor ===
==== Poetry ====
- Dichte, denn die Welt ist leck. Gedichte junger Münchner Autoren II. Sonnenreiter-Publikation (private print), Rosenheim 1985, ISBN 3-88684-056-5 (with Friedrich Ani, Norbert Kron u.a.).
- Gedichte über Leben. Goldmann, Munich 1987, ISBN 3-442-21013-5 (co-editor: Olaf Alp).
- Eiszeit-Heißzeit. Literatur der 80er Jahre. Goldmann, Munich 1988, ISBN 3-442-21036-4 (co-editor: Thomas C. Becker).
- Nichts geht mehr - aber spielt ruhig weiter! Liebe made in Germany. Goldmann, Munich 1989, ISBN 3-442-09642-1 (co-editor: Thomas C. Becker u.a.).
- Im Flügelschlag der Sinne. Erotische Gedichte. Initiative Junger Autoren, München 1991, ISBN 3-926684-15-1 (co-editor: Anton Wallner).
- Unterwegs ins Offene. Landpresse, Weilerswist 2000, ISBN 3-930137-96-8 (together with Axel Kutsch).
- Heiß auf dich. 100 Lock- und Liebesgedichte. Dtv/Hanser, Munich 2002, ISBN 3-423-62088-9 (co-editor: Anja Utler).
- SMS-Lyrik. 160 Zeichen Poesie. Dtv/Hanser, Munich 2002, ISBN 3-423-62124-9.
- Wörter kommen zu Wort. 100 Gedichte aus 10 Jahren "Das Gedicht". Artemis & Winkler, Düsseldorf 2002, ISBN 3-538-06954-9.
- Ein Poet will Dein sein. Liedlyrik. Reclam Verlag, Leipzig 2004, ISBN 3-379-00825-7.
- Es sitzt ein Vogel auf dem Leim. Rabenschwarze Gedichte. Reclam Verlag, Leipzig 2004, ISBN 3-379-00824-9.
- Himmelhoch jauchzend - zu Tode betrübt. Poesie für alle Liebeslagen. Dtv/Hanser, München 2004, ISBN 3-423-62186-9.
- Herz, was soll das geben? Liebesgedichte. Reclam Verlag, Leipzig 2005, ISBN 3-379-00857-5.
- Zum Teufel, wo geht's in den Himmel? Poetische Wege. Dtv/Hanser, Munich 2005, ISBN 3-423-62228-8 (together with Siegfried Völlger).
- Der Garten der Poesie. Dtv, Munich 2006 (Neuausg. 2010), ISBN 3-423-13860-2 (together with Gabriele Trinckler).
- Die Arche der Poesie. Lieblingsgedichte deutscher Dichter. Dtv, Munich 2007, ISBN 978-3-423-13561-0.
- "Kinder, Kinder!" Gedichte zur Kindheit (RUB; 18368) Philipp Reclam jun., Stuttgart 2007, ISBN 978-3-15-018368-7.
- Mutters Hände, Vaters Herz. Familiengedichte aus 2500 Jahren (Edition Chrismon). Hansisches Druck- & Verlagshaus, Frankfurt/M. 2007, ISBN 978-3-938704-36-3.
- Zu mir oder zu dir? Verse für Verliebte. Dtv/Hanser, Munich 2008, ISBN 978-3-423-62341-4.
- Im Ursprung ein Ei sprang. Gedichte vom Werden und Vergehen (Edition Chrismon). Hansisches Druck- & Verlagshaus, Frankfurt/M. 2008, ISBN 978-3-938704-59-2.
- Ohne dich bin ich nicht ich. Poesie in jeder Beziehung (Edition Chrismon). Hansisches Druck- & Verlagshaus, Frankfurt/M. 2008, ISBN 978-3-938704-70-7.
- Gedichte für Nachtmenschen. Dtv, Munich 2008, ISBN 978-3-423-13726-3 (together with Gabriele Trinckler).
- Ein Nilpferd schlummerte im Sand. Gedichte für Tierfreunde. Dtv, Munich 2009, ISBN 978-3-423-13754-6 (together with Gabriele Trinckler).
- power. lyrik. Dtv, München 2009, ISBN 978-3-423-13777-5.
- relax. lyrik. Dtv, München 2009, ISBN 978-3-423-13778-2.
- smile. lyrik. Dtv, München 2009, ISBN 978-3-423-13779-9.
- Feuer, Wasser, Luft & Erde. Die Poesie der Elemente. Philipp Reclam jun., Stuttgart, 1. ed 2003 (Universal-Bibliothek), ISBN 3-15-018246-8, 2. ed. 2009, ISBN 978-3-15-010727-0.
- Die Hoffnung fährt schwarz. Gedichte. Verlag Sankt Michaelsbund, Munich 2010, ISBN 978-3-939905-60-8.
- "Ois is easy". Gedichte aus Bayern. Verlag Sankt Michaelsbund, Munich 2010, ISBN 978-3-939905-71-4.
- Gedichte für Zeitgenossen. Lyrik aus 50 Jahren. Dtv, Munich 2011, ISBN 978-3-423-14006-5.
- Ein Känguru mit Stöckelschuh. Neue Gedichte für Kinder. Verlag Sankt Michaelsbund, Munich 2012.
- Weihnachtsgedichte. Dtv, München 2012, ISBN 978-3-423-14165-9 (together with Gabriele Trinckler).
- Gedichte für Reisende. Dtv, München 2015, ISBN 978-3-423-14393-6 (zusammen mit Gabriele Trinckler).
- Weltpost ins Nichtall. Poeten erinnern an August Stramm Daedalus Verlag, Münster 2015, ISBN 978-3-89126-310-5 (zusammen mit Hiltrud Herbst).
- Pausenpoesie. Gedichte zum Neustarten edition DAS GEDICHT im Anton G. Leitner Verlag, Weßling 2015, ISBN 978-3-929433-26-5.
- Mach dein erstes Türchen auf! Neue Gedichte zur Weihnacht Reclam Verlag, Ditzingen 2016, ISBN 978-3-15-011080-5.
- Heimat. Gedichte. Reclam Verlag, Ditzingen 2017, ISBN 978-3-15-011099-7.
- Der Himmel von morgen. Gedichte über Gott und die Welt. Reclam Verlag, Ditzingen 2018, ISBN 978-3-15-011051-5.
- Die Bienen halten die Uhren auf. Naturgedichte. Reclam Verlag, Ditzingen 2020, ISBN 978-3-15-011249-6.
- Verse für alle Liebeslagen. Reclam Verlag, Ditzingen 2021, ISBN 978-3-15-011315-8.
- Lichtblicke. Gedichte, die Mut machen. Reclam Verlag, Ditzingen 2023, ISBN 978-3-15-011377-6.
- Jede Jahreszeit ist schön. Gedichte für Frühling, Sommer, Herbst und Winter. Reclam Verlag, Ditzingen 2025, ISBN 978-3-15-011507-7.

==== Essays ====
- Experimente mit dem Echolot. Der modernen Dichtung auf den Grund gehen; die besten Aufsätze aus zehn Jahren "Das Gedicht". Lyrikedition 2000, Munich 2002, ISBN 3-935877-13-7.

=== Literature ===
- Dietz-Rüdiger Moser (ed.): Taschenlexikon zur bayerischen Gegenwartsliteratur. Piper, München 1986, ISBN 3-492-00774-0.
- Alfons Schweiggert (ed.): Autorinnen und Autoren in Bayern. 20. Jahrhundert. Verlag Bayerland, Dachau 2004, ISBN 3-89251-340-6.
- Joseph Kürschner (Begr.): Kürschners Deutscher Literatur-Kalender. Saur Verlag, München 2005, ISSN 0343-0936.
- Anton G. Leitner – Ein Leben für die Poesie. Anton G. Leitner Verlag, Weßling 2021.

== Online sources ==
- Literature by and about Anton G. Leitner in the German National Library catalogue
- Anton G. Leitner's Homepage
- Interview with Anton G. Leitner in the alpha-Forum, BR-alpha, Bayerischer Rundfunk 2009.
- Martin Wagner's interview with Anton G. Leitner in Eins zu Eins. Der Talk, Bayern 2, Bayerischer Rundfunk 2012.
