= Dagmara Kraus =

German poet and translator

Dagmara Kraus (born 10 March 1981) is a German poet and translator.

== Life and work ==
Dagmara Kraus was born on 10 March 1981 in Wrocław. She studied comparative literature and art history in Leipzig, Berlin and Paris as well as creative writing at the German Institute for Literature in Leipzig.

Among others, her poems appeared in literary magazines like Neue Rundschau, Edit and in the Jahrbuch der Lyrik (Poetry Yearbook). In 2012, she published her debut poetry collection kummerang with the publishing house kookbooks. The collection has been translated into American English by Joshua Daniel Edwin who was awarded a 2012 PEN/Heim Translation Fund Grant and a 2012 ALTA Fellowship for this translation. Also in 2012, Kraus' translations of poems by Miron Białoszewski were published under the title Wir Seesterne. Since 2021, Kraus has been a junior professor for creative writing at the University of Hildesheim. In 2022 and 2024, she has been part of the jury for the Merano Poetry Prize.

Kraus is a member of the PEN Centre Germany. She lives in Strasbourg, France.

== Critical reception ==
"With serendipitous intrepidness, she collects linguistic finds, word junk and sound rarities. [...] With audacious ease she takes the German language to the limits of its rule of grammar and beyond, into a constructed language never heard before. Every poetry collection from Kraus's workshop creates its own parallel German, which is created in but a different way and obeys a different poetic logic (Mit serendipischer Unerschrockenheit sammelt sie Sprachfundstücke, Worttrödel und Klangraritäten. [...] Mit frecher Leichtigkeit führt sie die deutsche Sprache an die Grenzen ihres Regelsystems, und darüber hinaus, in eine nie gehörte Kunstsprache. Jeder Gedichtband aus der Kraus'schen Werkstatt erschafft sich sein eigenes Paralleldeutsch, das auf je andere Art entsteht und einer je anderen poetischen Logik gehorcht.)" – Rudolf Bussmann and Simone Lappert in their laudatory speech for Dagmara Kraus at the Basel International Poetry Festival.

== Publications ==
=== Independent publications ===
- kummerang. Gedichte. kookbooks, Berlin 2012, ISBN 978-3-937445-50-2; english edition: gloomerang. poems. Translated from German by Joshua Daniel Edwin. Argos Books, New York City 2014
- kleine grammaturgie. Gedichte (roughbook 026). Engeler, Leipzig; Solothurn u. a. 2013
- revolvers für flubis. (= "Schöner Lesen" Nr. 118), SuKuLTuR, Berlin 2013, ISBN 978-3-941592-49-0
- das vogelmot schlich mit geknickter schnute (= Reihe Lyrik, Bd. 41). kookbooks, Berlin 2015, ISBN 978-3-937445-70-0
- wehbuch (undichte prosage) (roughbook 036). Urs Engeler, Berlin; Schupfart 2016, ISBN 978-3-906050-13-3
- LENZ. 0x0a, 2016 (downloadable as PDF)
- Aby Ohrkranf's Hunch poem (roughbook 046). Urs Engeler, New York City; San Francisco u. a. 2018, ISBN 978-3-906050-37-9
- liedvoll, deutschyzno. Gedichte. kookbooks, Berlin 2020, ISBN 978-3-948336-01-1
- Entstehung dunkel. Ein Geräuschtext. Audio-CD, in collaboration with Marc Matter. Moloko +, Schönebeck, OT Pretzien 2021, Catalog-Nr.: Plus 113
- Murfla und die Blocksbärte. Zu Miron Białoszewski. Verlag Das Wunderhorn, Heidelberg 2022, ISBN 978-3-88423-668-0
- Poetiken des Sprungs (Reihe: Theorie, Nr. 17), Urs Engeler, Schupfart 2022, ISBN 978-3-906050-60-7
- wille zur mache. Gedichte (= roughbook. Band 070). Urs Engeler, Schupfart 2026, ISBN 978-3-907369-23-4

=== Translations ===
- Miron Białoszewski: Wir Seesterne. Gedichte, Reinecke & Voß, Leipzig 2012, ISBN 978-3-942901-03-1
- Edward Stachura: Der Punkt überm Ypsilon, Hochroth Verlag, Berlin 2013, ISBN 978-3-902871-26-8
- Miron Białoszewski: Das geheime Tagebuch, selected and with an introduction by Tadeusz Sobolewski, Ed. FotoTAPETA, Berlin 2014, ISBN 978-3-940524-27-0
- Frédéric Forte: Anthologie der bulgarischen Musik vol. 2, Hochroth Verlag, Wiesenburg 2016, ISBN 978-3-902871-78-7
- Joanna Mueller: Mystische musthaves (translated in collaboration with Karolina Golimowska), Hochroth Verlag, Wiesenburg 2016, ISBN 978-3-902871-89-3
- Miron Białoszewski: M'ironien, roughbooks, Schupfart 2021, ISBN 978-3-906050-46-1

=== Editorships ===
- Miron Białoszewski: Vom Eischlupf. Nachdichtungen. Reinecke & Voß, Leipzig 2015, ISBN 978-3-942901-16-1.
- Alois M. Haas: Mein Geist hat sich verwildet. Alois M. Haas erzählt eine persönliche Geschichte der Mystik, supposé, Wyk auf Föhr 2021, ISBN 978-3-86385-150-7
- Urs Engeler: Poesie und Wiederholung, Universitätsverlag Hildesheim, Hildesheim 2022, ISBN 978-3-96424-064-4
- In collaboration with Sonja vom Brocke: Vom Wurzelfassen / im Bodenlosen. Die Textgelände der Marianne Fritz. Rigodon Verlag, Essen 2023 (= Schreibheft. Nr. 100), ISBN 978-3-924071-57-8

== Awards ==
- 2010 Advancement award for literature of the Gesellschaft zur Förderung der Westfälischen Kulturarbeit (GWK)
- 2011 Scholarship of the Senate of Berlin
- 2015 Advancement award of the Karl Sczuka Prize for Works of Radio Art for Entstehung dunkel together with Marc Matter
- 2016 Advancement award of the Heimrad Bäcker Prize
- 2017 Erlangen Prize for Poetry as Translation for her poetry and translation work
- 2018 Advancement award of the Kassel Literary Prize
- 2018 Basel Poetry Prize
- 2020 Cena Václava Buriana
- 2021 Honorary award of the Deutsche Schillerstiftung
- 2021 Merano Poetry Prize (1. prize)
