= Paul-Henri Campbell =

Poet, writer

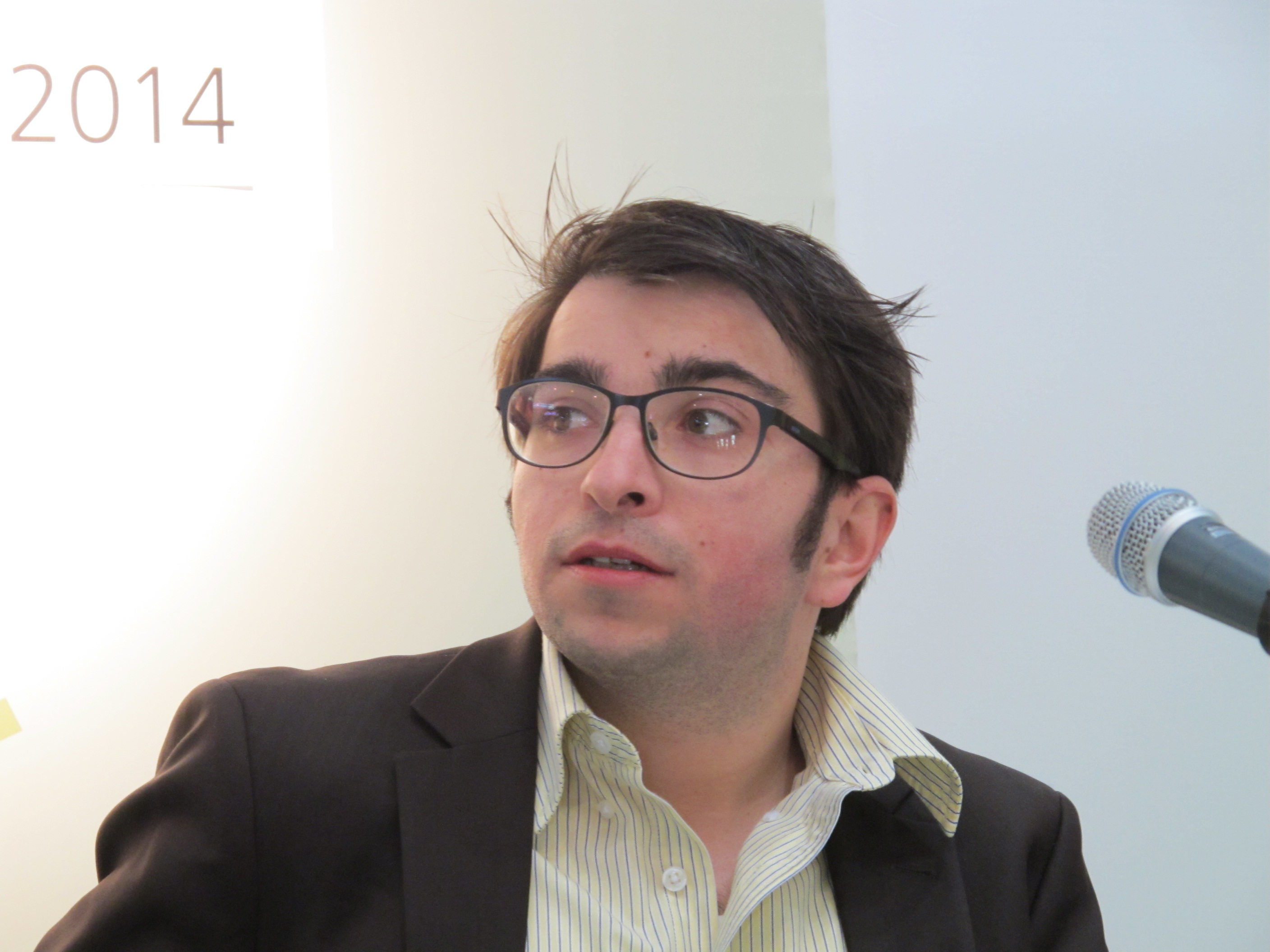
Paul-Henri Campbell (2014)

Paul-Henri Campbell (birth name: Christopher Paul-Henri Campbell; born 1982 in Boston, Massachusetts) is a German–American author. He writes in English and German. He studied classical philology (Ancient Greek) and Catholic theology at the National University of Ireland and the Goethe University Frankfurt in Frankfurt am Main.

== Biography ==
Paul-Henri Campbell is the son of an American army officer and a German nurse. He grew up in Massachusetts before moving to Germany with his parents, where he completed his high school education in Bavaria. Campbell has a serious congenital heart defect since birth and carries a pacemaker since the age of 24. He discontinued his doctoral studies in fundamental theology at the Jesuit University Sankt Georgen in Frankfurt am Main. He held senior positions at the Diocese of Limburg and the Austrian Conference of Religious Orders before becoming a freelance writer. He is married to violist and writer Tamara Štajner. He lives in Vienna, Austria.

Campbell is a founding member of PEN Berlin and was elected to its board in November 2024.

== Works ==
For his poetry collection nach den narkosen (2017), Campbell received the Bavarian arts and literary prize. Additionally, the literary critic Gregor Dotzauer selected the collection for Literaturhaus Berlin as one of the "Ten Poetry Collections of the Year 2017." Uljana Wolf nominated the collection for the poetry recommendations of the German Academy for Language and Literature in 2018. The collection features poems that develop a poetics of illness or "insufficiency," a poetic position for which Campbell coined the hermeneutic term "salutonormativity," inspired by Judith Butler.

He profiled numerous authors, artists, and musicians, such as Marianna Gartner, Sebastian Schrader, Gabriela Montero, Hartwig Ebersbach, Arno Rink, Sighard Gille, Michael Morgner. He wrote extensively about tattoo artists, such as Henk Schiffmacher, Manfred Kohrs, oder Alex Binnie. His work has been widely published in magazines and newspapers, such as Tagesspiegel (Berlin), Lichtungen (Graz), Stars & Stripes (Washington D.C.), Die Furche (Vienna), Akzente (Munich), Frankfurter Hefte (Berlin), World Literature Today (Oklahoma City), Volltext (Vienna), Das Gedicht, and others. He writes a biweekly column for the International Catholic Journal Communio, entitled "God in 99 Objects", and hosts the podcast "ÄNDERN leben" that discusses spirituality with a wide variety of guests, such as the award-winnig chef Konstantin Filippou, hairstylist Mario Krankl, the artist Elisabeth von Samsonow, as well as composers, photographers and writers.

== Bibliography ==
=== Author ===
- duktus operandi. Gedichte, ATHENA-Verlag, Oberhausen 2010, ISBN 978-3-89896-406-7.
- meinwahnstraße. Erzählungen, fhl-Verlag, Leipzig 2011, ISBN 978-3-942829-20-5.
- Space Race. Gedichte:Poems, fhl-Verlag, Leipzig 2012, ISBN 978-3-942829-21-2.
  - space race. Gedichte (erweiterte Neuauflage), Allitera Verlag, Munich 2015.
- Papst Benedikt XVI., Audiobook (Speakers: Andreas Herrler and Mirko Kasimir), Monarda Publishing House, Halle/Saale 2012.
- Am Ende der Zeilen | At the End of Days. Gedichte | Poetry, fhl-Verlag, Leipzig 2013.
- nach den narkosen | after anesthesia. Gedichte, Wunderhorn Verlag, Heidelberg 2017. ISBN 978-3-88423-556-0
- innere organe. Gedichte, Wunderhorn Verlag, Heidelberg 2022. ISBN 978-3-88423-670-3

=== Editor ===
- Paul-Henri Campbell (Hrsg.): Sottorealism. Aris Kalaizis, Imhof-Verlag, Petersberg 2013.
- Matthias Theodor Kloft, Paul-Henri Campbell (Hrsg.), Gotik im Westerwald, Ausstellungskatalog, Diözesanmuseum Limburg 2015.
- als Mitherausgeber von DIE WIEDERHOLUNG. Zeitschrift für Literaturkritik.
  - Alexandru Bulucz, Leonhard Keidel, Paul-Henri Campbell (Hrsg.): „Es ist so dunkel, dass die Menschen leuchten." Zum Werk von Werner Söllner, Die Wiederholung 4, Heidelberg 2017.
  - Alexandru Bulucz, Leonhard Keidel, Paul-Henri Campbell (Hrsg.): Die Wiederholung 5, Heidelberg 2017.
- Michael Braun, Paul-Henri Campbell (Hrsg.): Lyrik-Taschenkalender 2018, Wunderhorn Verlag, Heidelberg 2017.
- Paul-Henri Campbell (Hrsg.): Tattoo & Religion. Die bunten Kathedralen des Selbst (Interviews), Heidelberg 2019, ISBN 978-3-88423-606-2.
- zusammen mit Anton G. Leitner: Das Gedicht. Zeitschrift für Lyrik, Essay und Kritik Nr. 32: Menschlichkeit. Die Poesie der Nähe. Munich, 2024.

=== Translator ===
- Ludwig Steinherr, All Ears, Lyrikedition 2000, Munich 2013.
- Michael Augustin, Anton G. Leitner, Paul-Henri Campbell, Das Gedicht chapbook. German Poetry Now, Pegasus & Rosinante. When Poets Travel, Munich 2014.
- Anton G. Leitner, Paul-Henri Campbell, Das Gedicht chapbook. German Poetry Now, Lustful Things / Geile Sachen, Munich 2016.
- Ludwig Steinherr, Lichtgesang / Light Song, Lyrikedition 2000, München 2017.
- Koleka Putuma: Kollektive Amnesie. Das Wunderhorn, Heidelberg 2020.
- Ilma Rakusa: Love After Love, SurVision, Dublin 2021.

== Awards ==
- 2026 National Grant awarded by the German Literary Fund
- 2023 Innovation Award for his work on religious tattoos from the Zentrum für Pastoralforschung.
- 2022 Audience Appreciation Award at the Dresdner Lyrikpreis
- 2022 Alfred-Gruber-Preis beim Lyrikpreis Meran
- 2022 Residency at the Ubbelohde-Haus
- 2021 Dresdner Chamisso-Poetikdozentur
- 2020 Junge Akademie der Wissenschaften und Literatur in Mainz
- 2018 Junior Award at the Hermann-Hesse-Literaturpreises for nach den narkosen
- 2017 Bayerischer Kunstförderpreis (Literature)
