= Irseer Pegasus =

- Date: January 1999
- Location: Irsee, Ostallgäu
- Country: Germany
- Reward: $2257
- First award: 1999
- Final award: Januar 2020
- Currently held by: Ilija Matusko
- Website: www.irseer-pegasus.de

Irseer Pegasus is a literary event of the Swabian regional group of the Association of German Writers (Verband deutscher Schriftsteller VS) and the Schwabenakademie Irsee, which takes place annually in January at the Irsee monastery. The authors' meeting promotes encounters and discussion within a workshop of writers from the fields of fiction, poetry. and essay writing. Joint textual discussion and literary discussion, as well as the awarding of a prize for literature, are the highpoints of the meeting.

== Eligibility requirements ==
Authors should be able to demonstrate at least one independent book publication (not self-published) or to present comparable publications. Applications must be submitted by the end of October of the previous year at the latest. A jury evaluates the submitted texts, which must be able to be read in a maximum of 15 minutes.

Jury members are:

- Ulrike Draesner, author and translator
- Terézia Mora (2020)
- Sylvia Heudecker, Director of Studies of the Schwabenakademie Irsee
- Thomas Kraft, author and publisher, chairman of the Association of German Writers in Bavaria
- Markus Orths, writer

Previous jury members included Rainer Jehl, Fritz Reutemann, Eva Leipprand, and Rainer Wochele.

== Prices and awards ==
A special feature of the meeting is the fact that the authors participating in the workshop award one of the two prizes themselves. The following guidelines have applied since 2015: Each participant receives a sheet of paper with the names of the participating authors and can rate his competitors on a scale of 0 to 5. The author who scores the highest receives the prize in the amount of €2000 ($2257). Evaluation of the scores is done by employees of the Schwabenakademie. A second prize is awarded by the jury, which is also endowed with €2000.

Participation in the workshop and prize competition is possible up to three times, but prizewinners are not eligible to win again. The prize is considered a young talent award and is attentively followed by other literary professionals. Many of the prizewinners went on to receive later other, sometimes more significant prizes, such as the Feldkirch prize or the Dresden Poetry Prize.

== Publications ==
In 2008, an anthology with selected texts from the workshop was issued for the 10th anniversary of the Irseer Pegasus. Luft unter den Flügeln (Air Beneath the Wings) was published by Klöpfer & Meyer and was presented with others at a reading in Bregenz.

== Winners ==
- 1999: Ernst T. Mader, Peter Dempf, Rainer Wochele
- 2000: Stefan Monhardt, Bernhard Setzwein, Felicitas Andresen-Kohring
- 2001: Max Sessner, Birgit Wiesner, Arwed Vogel
- 2002: Markus Orths, Sylvie Gonsolin-Schenk, Nadja Sennewald
- 2003: Hellmut Seiler, Volker Demuth, Jürgen-Thomas Ernst
- 2004: Kai Weyand, Werner Baur, Peter Blickle
- 2005: Ria Neumann, Wolfgang Sréter, Ferdinand Scholz
- 2006: Carl-Christian Elze, Ralph Grüneberger, Silke Knäpper, Walle Sayer
- 2007: Christoph Schwarz, Nathalie Schmid, Hartwig Mauritz, Jörg Neugebauer
- 2008: Martin Strauß, Konrad Roenne, Dominik Dombrowski, Jutta Reichelt
- 2009: Armin Steigenberger, Inka Kleinke-Bialy, Anja Kampmann, Hedy Sadoc
- 2010: Thilo Krause, Carmen Kotarski, Anke Laufer, Axel Görlach, Robert Blunder
- 2011: Silke Heimes, Thomas Josef Wehlim, Thomas Steiner, Norbert Mayer
- 2012: Manuela Bibrach, Moritz Heger, Maya Rinderer, Ludwig Rapp
- 2013: Harald Jöllinger, Kerstin Becker, Helmut Glatz, Daniel Ableev
- 2014: Birgit Kreipe, Gertraud Klemm, Ulrike Schäfer
- 2015: Birgit Birnbacher, Ulrich Effenhauser
- 2016: Adi Traar, Michael Lichtwarck-Aschoff
- 2017: Kai Bleifuß, David Krause
- 2018: Martin Piekar, Mario Schlembach
- 2019: Peter Zimmermann
- 2020: Ilija Matusko
- 2021: Melanie Khoshmashrab, Kathrin Niemela

== Guest authors ==
- 2000 Ulrike Längle
- 2001 Anna Mitgutsch
- 2002 Andreas Maier
- 2003 Angela Kraus
- 2007 Angelika Overath
- 2008 Gert Heidenreich
- 2009 Karl-Heinz Ott
- 2010 Matthias Politycki
- 2011 Dagmar Leupold
- 2012 Thomas Lehr
- 2013 Ulrich Pinion
