= Tamara Štajner =

Slovenian violist and writer (born 1987)

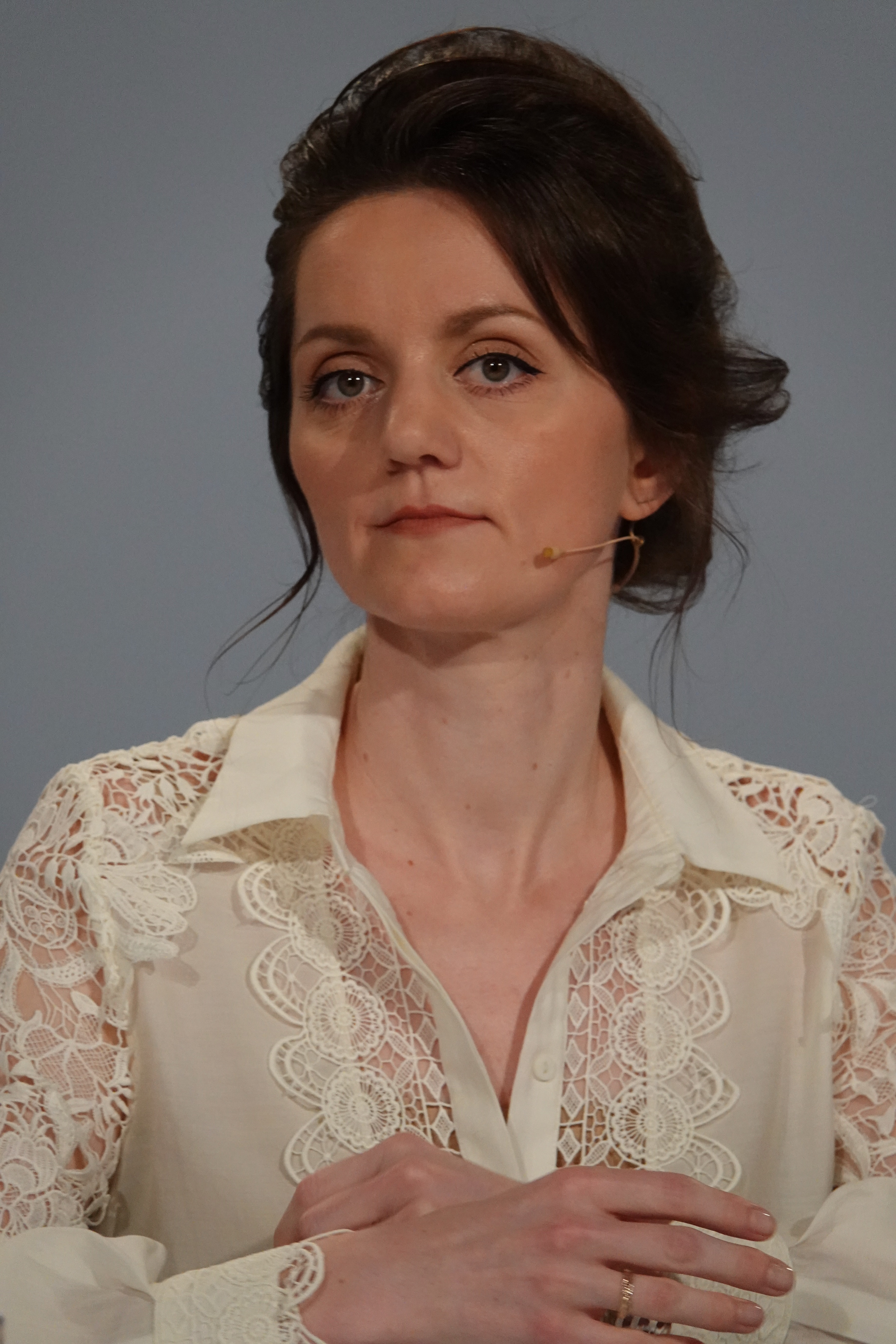
- Štajner at the Ingeborg Bachmann Prize 2024
- Born: 6 September 1987 (age 38); Novo Mesto, SR Slovenia, Yugoslavia
- Occupations: Violist, writer
- Writing career
- Language: Slovenian, German

Tamara Štajner (born 6 September 1987 in Novo mesto, then Yugoslavia) is a Slovenian violist and writer. She writes in Slovenian and German.

== Early life and education ==
Štajner grew up in Krško, a town on the Sava in southeastern Slovenia. She later attended the Konservatorij za glasbo in balet music high school in Ljubljana and moved to Vienna at the age of 18. She studied viola at the University of Music and Performing Arts Vienna.

== Career ==
She has performed as a soloist and in chamber music ensembles in premieres of new music, including with Quasars Ensemble (Bratislava), Ensemble reconsil (Vienna), ensemble xxi. jahrhundert (Vienna) and Ensemble Wiener Collage (Vienna). Štajner has also played in period sound orchestras, including the Balthasar Neumann Ensemble, the Orchester Wiener Akademie, the Main Baroque Orchestra and the Darmstadt Baroque Soloists. She has taken part in numerous tours to Japan, China, India, Colombia and all over Europe, e.g. E.g. with RSO Vienna, Vienna Concert Society, Vienna Boys' Choir, and Vienna Academy Orchestra.

As a performer, Štajner has appeared at the Vienna MuseumsQuartier, Vienna Art Week, the Vienna Secession, the Kunstraum Niederösterreich, OstLicht, the Centre national de l'audiovisuel (Luxembourg) and Williams College in Massachusetts, among others. She has collaborated across art forms, for example with Elisabeth von Samsonow and Christian Reiner. She combines audiovisual, performative and scriptural art in digital and analogue spaces. She has led interdisciplinary workshops, including at the Music and Arts University of the City of Vienna, the University of Music and Performing Arts Graz and has worked as a lecturer at the organization Superar (Vienna) and Al Kamandjâti in Ramallah.

The author works at the intersection of music and literature. Her first poetry collection, Schlupflöcher, was published in 2022 by Das Wunderhorn in Heidelberg. It was translated by Rebecca Weingart into English in 2026.

Tamara Štajner’s work has also appeared in journals such as Lichtungen, Literatur und Kritik, DAS GEDICHT, manuskripte and Ostragehege. She regularly contributes to the magazine Musikfreunde of the Wiener Musikverein, including artist portraits, for example of Clara Iannotta, Chaya Czernowin, and Lili Boulanger.

She has developed several performance programmes combining poetry and music. The novel Raupenfell (2023) marked her prose debut. In 2026, her Slovenian debut novel Goseničji kožuh was published by Beletrina.

== Awards and honours ==
In 2024, Štajner won the first prize at the Merano Poetry Prize. In the same year, at the invitation of Brigitte Schwens-Harrant, Štajner read her text Luft nach unten at the Ingeborg Bachmann Prize 2024 and won the Kelag Prize.

== Bibliography ==
- Schlupflöcher. Poetry Collection. Verlag Das Wunderhorn, Heidelberg 2022; ISBN 978-3-88423-672-7
  - Loopholes. Poetry Chapbook, translated by Rebecca Weingart, Toad Press Chapbooks, La Verne, California 2026.
- Raupenfell. Novel. Verlag Das Wunderhorn, Heidelberg 2023; ISBN 978-3-88423-701-4
- Slovalia. Eine Verkuppelung, a multilingual long poem set to music by Anna Anderluh, commissioned by the Carinthischer Sommer (2025). World premiere at the Bachmann Dome, Nova Gorica, 25 April 2025.
- Goseničji kožuh. Novel. Published by Beletrina, Ljubljana, 2026.
- Engel der Improvisation, a multilingual long poem written as part of a compositional commission to Marco Sau for the Mahler Forum for Music and Society, Vienna. World premiere at Künstlerhaus Klagenfurt, 11 July 2026.
- Inge träumt. Ein Kärntner Triptychon, immersive theatre work created together with Paul-Henri Campbell. World premiere at kärnten.museum, 3 September 2026.
- Luft nach unten. Novel. Published by Zsolnay Verlag, Vienna 2026.
