= Das Gedicht =

German language poetry magazine

DAS GEDICHT
- Editor: Anton G. Leitner
- Former editors: Ludwig Steinherr (1993); Markus Bundi (2008); Friedrich Ani (2009); Ulrich Johannes Beil (2010); Arne Rautenberg (2011); Matthias Politycki (2012); Michael Augustin (2013); Hellmuth Opitz (2014); Kerstin Hensel (2015); Fitzgerald Kusz (2016); José F. A. Oliver (2017); Melanie Arzenheimer (2018); Christoph Leisten (2019); Frank Klötgen (2023); Paul-Henri Campbell (2024); Matthias Kröner (2025)
- Categories: Poetry
- Frequency: Yearly
- Circulation: 3,000 - 5,000
- Publisher: Anton G. Leitner Verlag
- First issue: October 1993
- Country: Germany
- Based in: Munich, Bavaria
- Language: German
- ISSN: 0943-0776

Das Gedicht ([ɡəˈdɪçt]; lit. 'The Poem'; styled in all caps), established 1993, is the largest poetry magazine in the German-speaking world. It was founded by the poet and publisher Anton G. Leitner together with Ludwig Steinherr. Between 1994 and 2007 as well as between 2020 and 2022, Leitner served as its sole editor. Between 2008 and 2019, as well as between 2023 and 2025 Leitner has edited the annual periodical with changing co-editors.

== Context ==
German - in comparison to English - being a relatively small language, periodicals, almanacs, and anthologies play an important role in negotiating the most current developments in its contemporary poetry. For this reason, DAS GEDICHT takes a central role in giving new and established voices a forum. It makes new trends in the aesthetics of poetic production visible. The magazine is also indicative of the trends in the ways in which poetry is received by the contemporary German speaking audience.

== Main Focus ==
Since its first edition in 1993, DAS GEDICHT has published original, often seminal work from German-language poets as well as critical essays from contemporary writers and scholars. Each edition follows a theme (e.g. erotica, religion, pop, political poetry, poems about children, animals, health, or nature). The themes are announced only to subscribers of the magazine. In addition, the book-length editions include criticism and commentary as well as a detailed bibliography of new releases in the genre.

The work performed by the editors has gained widespread national and international recognition over the years. Through their broad publicity campaign for the publication, the editors of DAS GEDICHT have not only brought attention to the magazine itself, but have tremendously increased the acceptance and visibility of poetry in the general public. Hence, DAS GEDICHT has often been the root of an international public discourse on the role of poetry in the contemporary world, particularly in Germany, Austria, Switzerland, and Luxembourg. It also serves as an important archive of contemporary poetry and is a part of a poetic culture of collective memory: for instance, the magazine has published the last poems by Karl Krolow. In order to maintain its independence, DAS GEDICHT operates without governmental funding. On November 7, 2024, the Cultural Committee of the Munich City Council (Kulturausschuss des Münchner Stadtrats) unanimously decided to purchase Anton G. Leitner's literary estate and archives (Initiative of Young Authors, publisher's archive "Das Gedicht") for the Monacensia Literary Archive of the City of Munich in the Hildebrandhaus. The agreed purchase price is undisclosed.

== History ==
Today, DAS GEDICHT ranks among the top-selling poetry publications in the German language and is one of the largest periodicals specifically dedicated to the genre in German. DAS GEDICHT attracted international attention; when it released a listing of Poets of the Century (Vol 7, 1999/2000), which has been published and republished several million times worldwide. At the turn of the 21st century, Anton G. Leitner had invited 50 leading critics and poets to vote on the national and international Top 100 Poets.

Interventions, like the TOP-100 poets that DAS GEDICHT identified by way of a commission, headed by 50 major literary critics, poets, editors, and literary scholars, have made DAS GEDICHT not only an internationally recognized publication for poetry, but also a model for successfully raising cultural awareness of poetry. With respect to the success of DAS GEDICHT, the Bavarian State Newspaper put for the question: "What is going on with the reading humanity? Why can't they suddenly be without poetry?" With DAS GEDICHT in view, the critic and member of the Group 47, Joachim Kaiser, said in the Bayerischer Rundfunk: "Suddenly, we are beginning to understand how important poetry can be."

The first edition in October 1993 already received widespread attention with over 130 reports in newspapers, magazines, and radio broadcasts discussing its work in every German-speaking country. Many commentators noted its conceptual clarity as well as its international and intergenerational approach. This editorial method has made the magazine an "integrative" medium for contemporary poetry in the German language. Like no other publication, DAS GEDICHT was able to initiate a widespread debate on poetry with a broad scope of readers. The Stuttgarter Zeitung wrote that the genre poetry is setting out on a "search for the traces of a new identity" with DAS GEDICHT.

=== The Erotik-Special Scandal of 2000/2001 ===
On grounds of obscenity, various branches within the German book market boycotted the sale of DAS GEDICHT Volume 8, which was centered on erotic poetry. While intended to simply feature erotic poetry by major contemporary German, Austrian, and Swiss poets, the edition was misunderstood by many in the reading public, who claimed it was pornographic. The editor was scolded by a number of self-announced patrons of morality. The Süddeutsche Zeitung wrote, the Erotik-Special was "shocking and authentic." The Austrian artist Gerhard Rühm contributed Bildstrophen (German lit., iconic stanzas) embellishing the edition´s interior design. The edition sold over 10,000 copies.

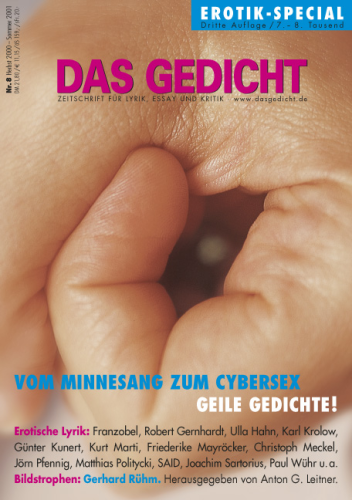
Cover: DAS GEDICHT Vol. 8: Vom Minnesang zum Cybersex - geile Gedichte

At the height of the scandal, the national weekly Der Spiegel said:

A bookstore in Mainz denied the delivery of the magazine, saying that 'the Cathedral was too close by.' In Münster 10 ordered copies were rejected, and a further bookseller sent the magazine right back. In Dachau a recipient poet was so offended by the volume, so that he wrote to the editor, claiming that in the future he'd rather invest in an additional sachet full of Weißbier than to buy another copy of DAS GEDICHT. Blushing, a sales representative in a bookshop said that she couldn't even put the Erotik-Special on display in her store. The Swiss poet and reformed pastor, Kurt Marti, himself featured in the volume, gave the amused remarks that the edition had brought together 'a most multifaceted collection of poems.'

The reactions to DAS GEDICHT Vol. 8 ranged from simple gestures of dismay to crass invectives against the editors and even amounted to multiple death threats, as the sample recording shows. The editorial board had already anticipated such reactions and added little perforated paper screens that could be individually used to censor displeasing lines while reading.

As however, in an act of solidarity, major German newspapers (such as Bild, Spiegel Online, Süddeutsche Zeitung) reprinted a number of erotic poems from that edition, the following edition of DAS GEDICHT celebrated widespread success, having won a great number of fans. The national weekly Focus included DAS GEDICHT in its list of the 100 best books of the year at rank 41. Major German broadcasters, such as the Westdeutscher Rundfunk, aired an erotic poem from the Erotik-Special edition each day on public radio. The German sex talk show host, Lilo Wanders, recited poems from that edition in her nationally aired late night television show, Wa(h)re Liebe.

=== Poetry in the Public Sphere ===
==== Public Debates on Poetry ====
While many poetry magazines are purely interested in the art form, without reflecting its role in society, the circle associated with DAS GEDICHT has emphasized the public status of poetic expression from the beginning. The editors of the very first edition in 1993, for example, supplemented the volume with additional material on 'Poems and the Stasi.' The volume contained the first Stasi files on literary figures to be published freely.

In cooperation with the literary scholar Ulrich Johannes Beil, DAS GEDICHT initiated a widely followed debate on, "Is there such a thing as a European poem?" Alongside translations from English, Spanish, or Classical Greek authors, the magazine regularly features German-language poetry from outside Germany, such as Austrian, Swiss, and Luxembourgish poetry. DAS GEDICHT has also often been the root of productive altercations among aesthetic positions and has facilitated debate among poets. Looking at the question – short poem or long poem – many prominent German poets engaged in critical exchange within the realm of the magazine: Durs Grünbein, Walter Höllerer, and Jürgen Becker. The critic and member of the Group 47, Joachim Kaiser, dedicated a larger portion of his radio broadcast, in order to give this debate a national audience.

==== Political Interventions ====
In October 1999, Anton G. Leitner on behalf of the editorial board of DAS GEDICHT demanded in a public notice that the Humboldt University of Berlin abnegate the PhD title from the German literary scholar Elisabeth Frenzel (author of the standard reference book Daten deutscher Dichtung) on grounds of antisemitic tendencies in her dissertation. A violent debate developed from this request and also involved the president of the Humboldt University. He strangely argued: "By withdrawing academic titles, we`d be following in the steps of the National Socialists." The German liberal national paper, Süddeutsche Zeitung, was perplexed by this argument and wrote in a commentary that it was "at a total loss" with respect to the University´s line of argument. In the course of the controversy, Anton G. Leitner received multiple letters with antisemitic contents and threats.

With respect to DAS GEDICHT, a similar advocacy for more democracy in the name of poetry has become evident in the controversy between the editors of DAS GEDICHT and Günter Grass in 2006. The Nobel Prize laureate, Günter Grass, had surprisingly revealed his membership in the Waffen-SS, after many years. Anton G. Leitner, speaking on behalf of DAS GEDICHT, requested that Grass donate the revenues from his autobiographical book Häuten der Zwiebel to victims of the holocaust. Leitner told a German national newspaper: Grass could "easily show that he is in no way financially interested in profiting from his literary investigation of his own involvement with the Waffen-SS."

==== Public Awareness of the Art Form ====
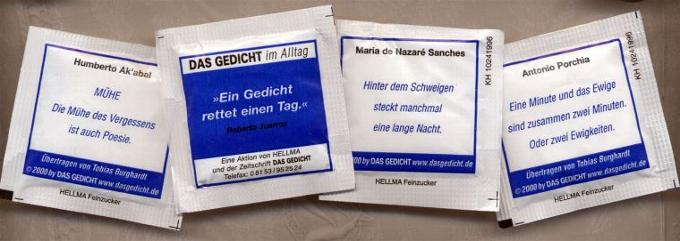
Sugar packets with poetic verses by the company HELLMA

Aside from more political or poetological debates, DAS GEDICHT also has initiated public campaigns to bring poetry into every-day life. It is a key player in shaping the literary culture at the grass roots as well as in the avant-garde. It actively cultivates the literary field in the German-speaking countries. By printing verses onto millions of little sugar pouches and baguette bags, for instance, DAS GEDICHT contributed to raising public awareness for poetry as an art form. This campaign was initiated in collaboration with the sugar producer HELLMA. One media commentator called these sweet verses: "Crystals against life's bitterness."

=== International Summit on Poetry ===
Celebrating the 20th anniversary of DAS GEDICHT, the magazine organized an international summit on poetry in Munich, Germany. The event took place on October 23, 2012. It featured readings from sixty major poets from Germany, Austria, Switzerland, and Luxemburg, such as Friedrich Ani, Joachim Sartorius, Ulrike Draesner, Franz Xaver Kroetz, Paul Maar, Matthias Politycki, Said, and Robert Schindel. The summit was broadcast in full-length (156 minutes) by the Bayerische Rundfunk (BR-Alpha) within the series Denkzeit.

=== 25 years DAS GEDICHT ===
The publication of the 25th edition of DAS GEDICHT in October 2018 was accompanied by several events. At a colloquium titled "Die Zukunft der Poesie" (The Future of Poetry) several poets gave speeches, among them Paul-Henri Campbell, Christophe Fricker, Uwe Michael Gutzschhahn, Klára Hůrková, Erich Jooß, and Anatoly Kudryavitsky. At a demonstration at Munich Marienplatz, held by DAS GEDICHT and Amnesty International Munich, several authors stood up for other poets being denied their basic human rights. Friedrich Ani and Christoph Leisten gave a speech in honour of DAS GEDICHT at the large public reading at Literaturhaus München.

== International Edition: DAS GEDICHT chapbook ==
German Poetry Now

Together with the poet and translator Paul-Henri Campbell as their co-editor, the editors of DAS GEDICHT launched an international edition in English: DAS GEDICHT chapbook. German Poetry Now. The pilot edition (Vol. 1: Pegasus & Rosinante. When Poets Travel.) is based on No. 21 of the German main edition. It includes major authors in contemporary German poetry from Austria, Switzerland, Germany, and Israel. The second edition followed 2016 (Vol. 2: Lustful Things – Geile Sachen). It contains texts previously published under the same title on dasgedichtblog.Lustful Things - Geile Sachen on dasgedichtblog

== Online and SocialMedia ==
The magazine has maintained a website since 1995 and operates a YouTube channel since October 2009. Using conventional online media and social media, DAS GEDICHT has been exploring various effects of online formats to the genre. Via YouTube, it publishes poetry clips (dasgedichtclip) that show recordings from poetry readings and poems in video production. In 2012, inspired by the magazine's 20th jubilee, DAS GEDICHT began a blog (dasgedichtblog) and published a directory of poems it has published over the more than 30 years of its existence.

== Awards ==
- 1996: AusLese, Cultural Prize of the Stiftung Lesen
- 1997: Victor Otto Stomps-Prize
- 1999: Kogge-Literaturpreis of the City of Minden
- 2001: Kulturförderpreis des Landkreises Starnberg
- 2016: Tassilo-Kulturpreis der Süddeutschen Zeitung
- 2022: Deutscher Verlagspreis
- 2022: Verlagsprämie des Freistaats Bayern
- 2023: Deutscher Verlagspreis
- 2023/24: Alexander Sacher Masoch-Preis, Literaturhaus Wien
- 2026: Deutscher Verlagspreis

== See also ==
- Das Gedicht. Blätter für die Dichtung
- German literature
