= Bistaar =

Bistaar: Chittagong Arts Complex
- বিস্তার: চিটাগং আর্টস কমপ্লেক্স
- Logo of Bistaar

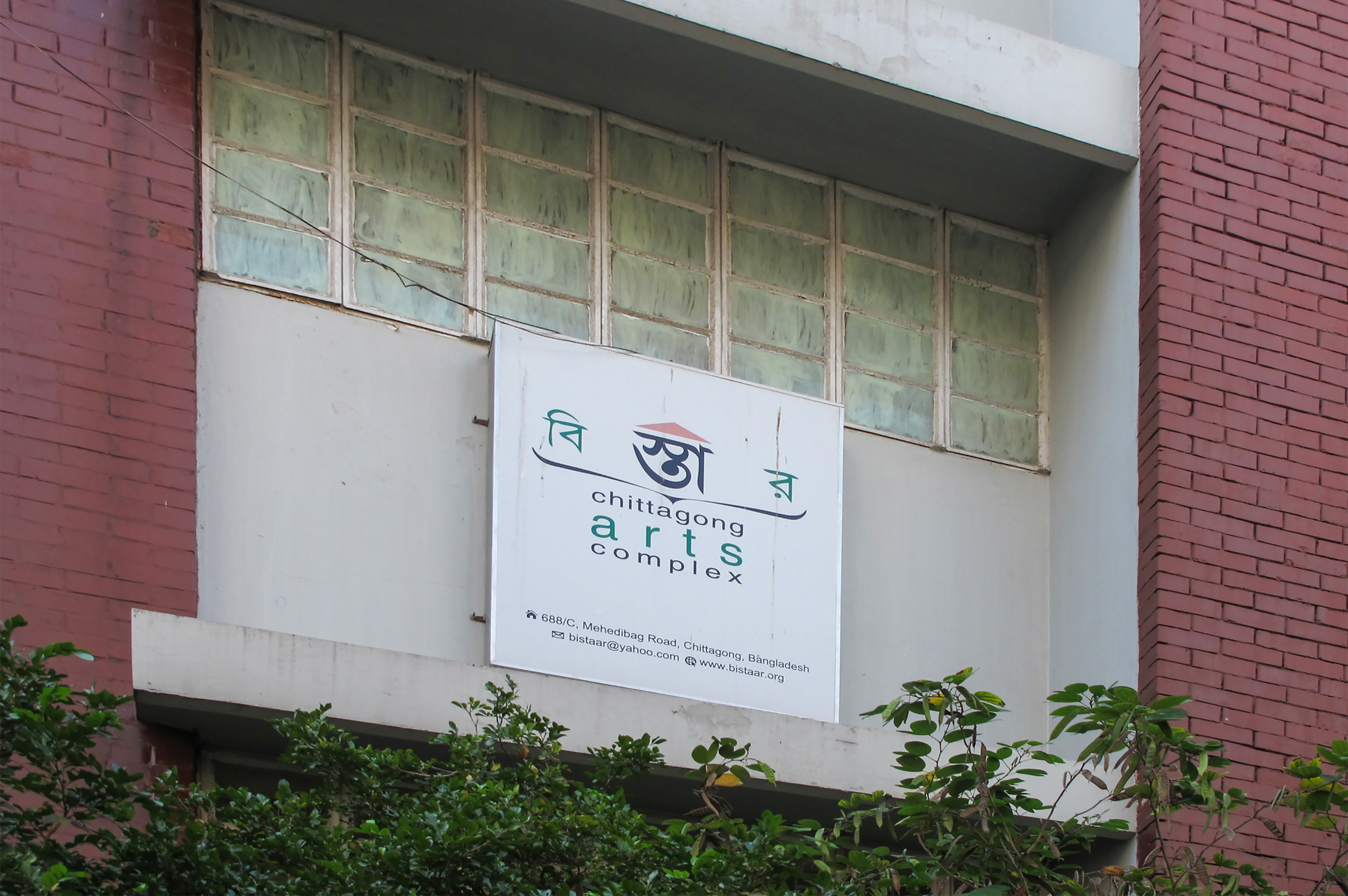
- Entrance
- Abbreviation: BCAC
- Predecessor: Bishaud Bangla
- Formation: 29 December 2014; 11 years ago
- Founder: Alam Khorshed
- Founded at: Chittagong, Bangladesh
- Type: Non-profit organization
- Legal status: Active
- Headquarters: Mehedibag
- Location: Chittagong, Bangladesh
- Coordinates: 22.353844°N 91.8222392°E
- Region served: Chittagong
- Members: 50+ (2019)
- Director: Alam Khorshed
- Subsidiaries: Bishaud Bangla
- Website: bistaar.org

Bistaar: Chittagong Arts Complex was a self-sustained, multidisciplinary and multifaceted arts facility based in port city of Chittagong in Bangladesh. The place was also a contemporary venue for performing arts and culture in the city. Founded in late 2014 by the writer, translator and cultural personality Alam Khorshed, under non-profit project called Chittagong Arts Trust. In 2016, it has been listed as one of the seven art organizations in South Asia by ArtX's ASEF culture360 under the Arts Management Caselet Project

== Background ==
=== Bishaud Bangla ===
Bishaud Bangla, served over nine years as a small-scale arts organization of different ilk, but it closed its doors in 2014, only to transform itself into a bigger and full-blown arts space.

=== Formation of Bistaar ===
After the end of Bishaud Bangla, its new incarnation, named as "Bistaar: Chittagong Arts Complex", started its artistic journey on 29 December 2014, coinciding with the birth centenary of Zainul Abedin, the pioneer of modern art movement of Bangladesh, by hosting a group paintings exhibition of the post-graduate students of the Institute of Fine Arts of the University of Chittagong as a tribute to the maestro.

== Departments ==
- Parampara (পরম্পরা) - gallery and event space
- Komal Gandhar (কোমল গান্ধার) - music and films archive
- Bishaud Bangla (বিশদ বাঙলা) - souvenir shop
- Chatok Cafe (চাতক ক্যাফে) - food and drinks cafe

== Activities ==
Bistaar organizes art activities like visual art exhibitions, presentations, workshops, film screenings, concerts, dance demonstrations, plays, literary sessions etc. all year round. In addition to these, it also arranges a yearly festival named Bistaar Shilpa Utshab (or Bistaar Arts Festival).

== Gallery ==
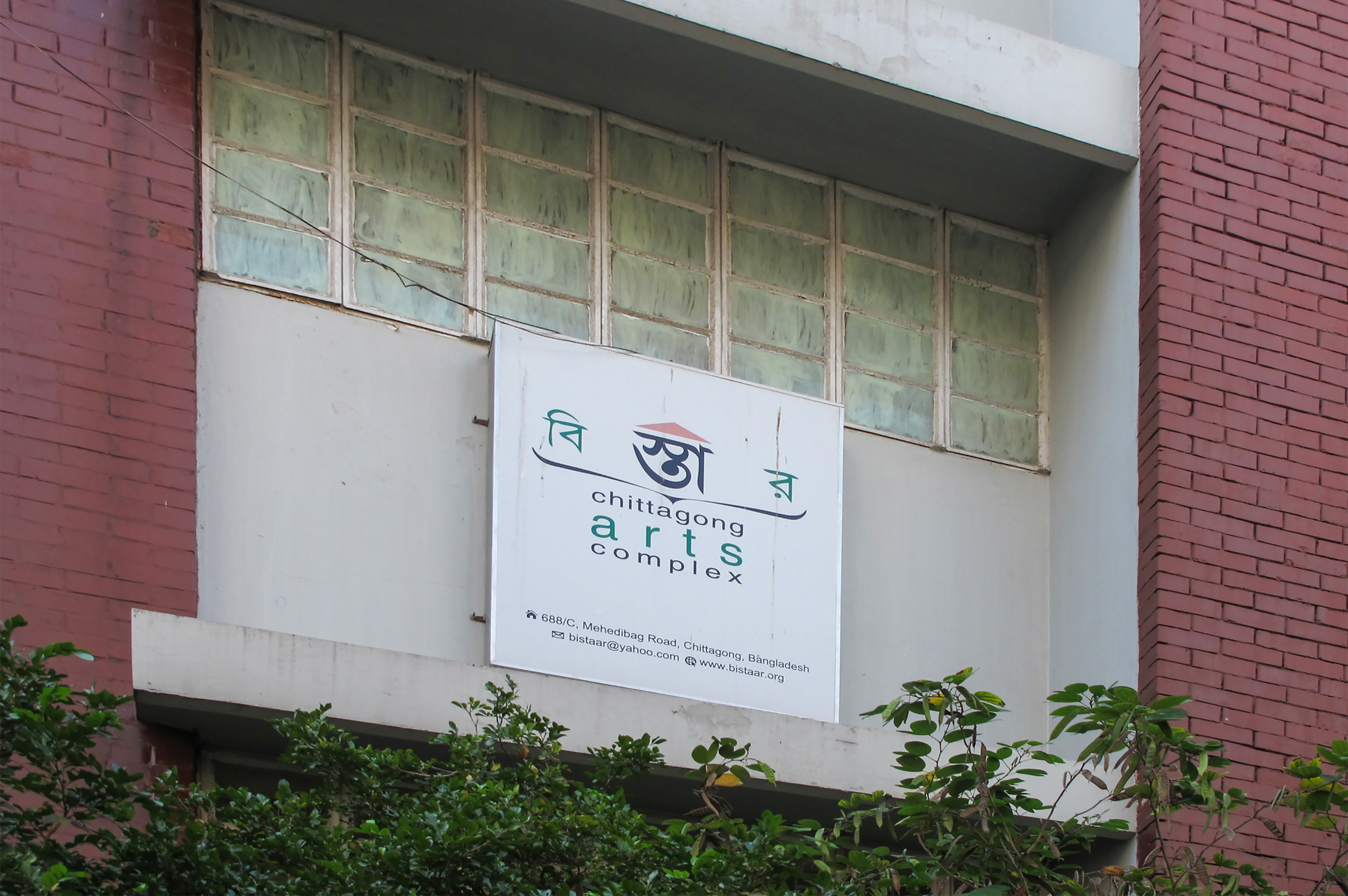
Entrance

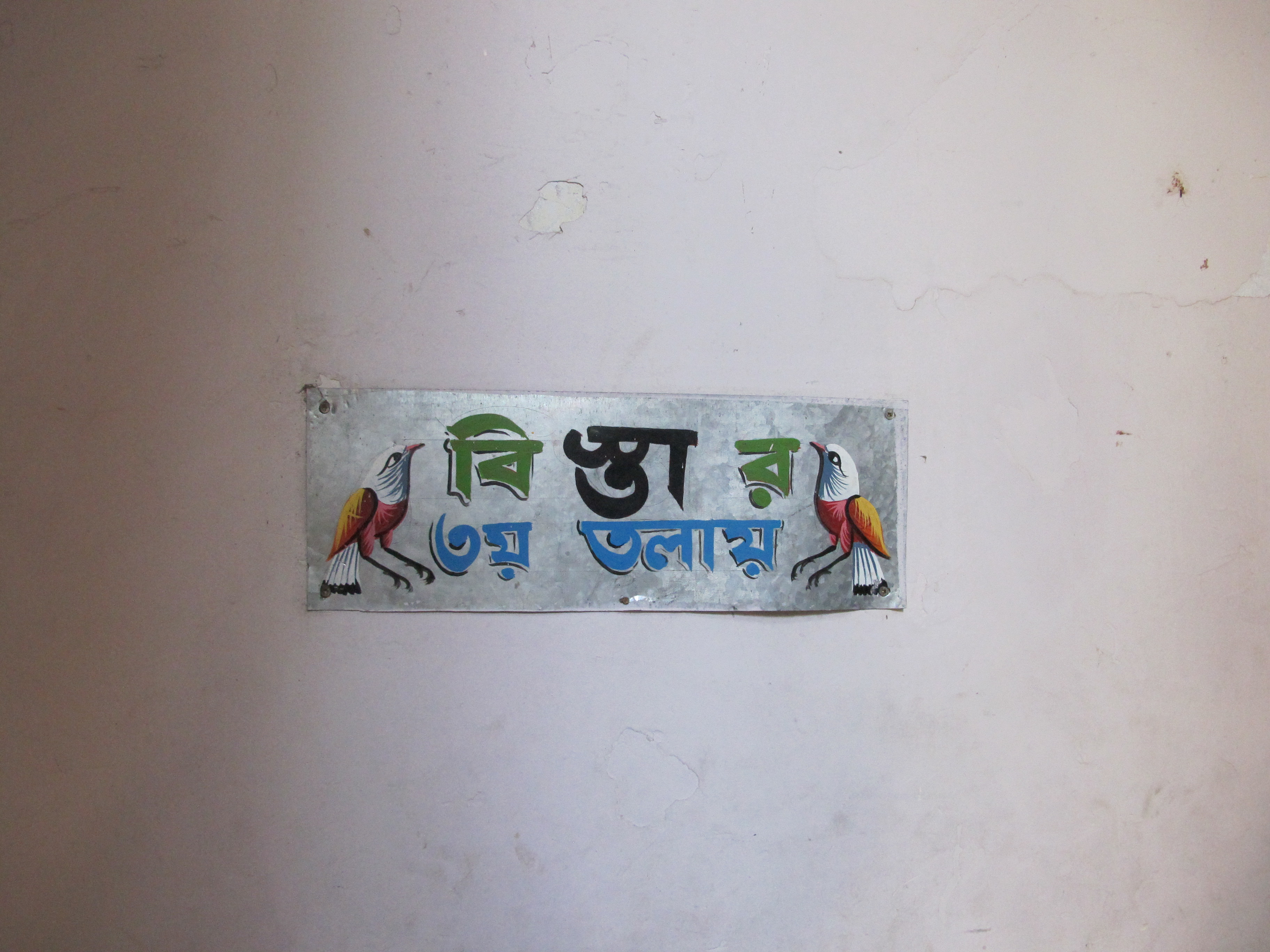
Direction sign

Komal Gandhar - music and films archive

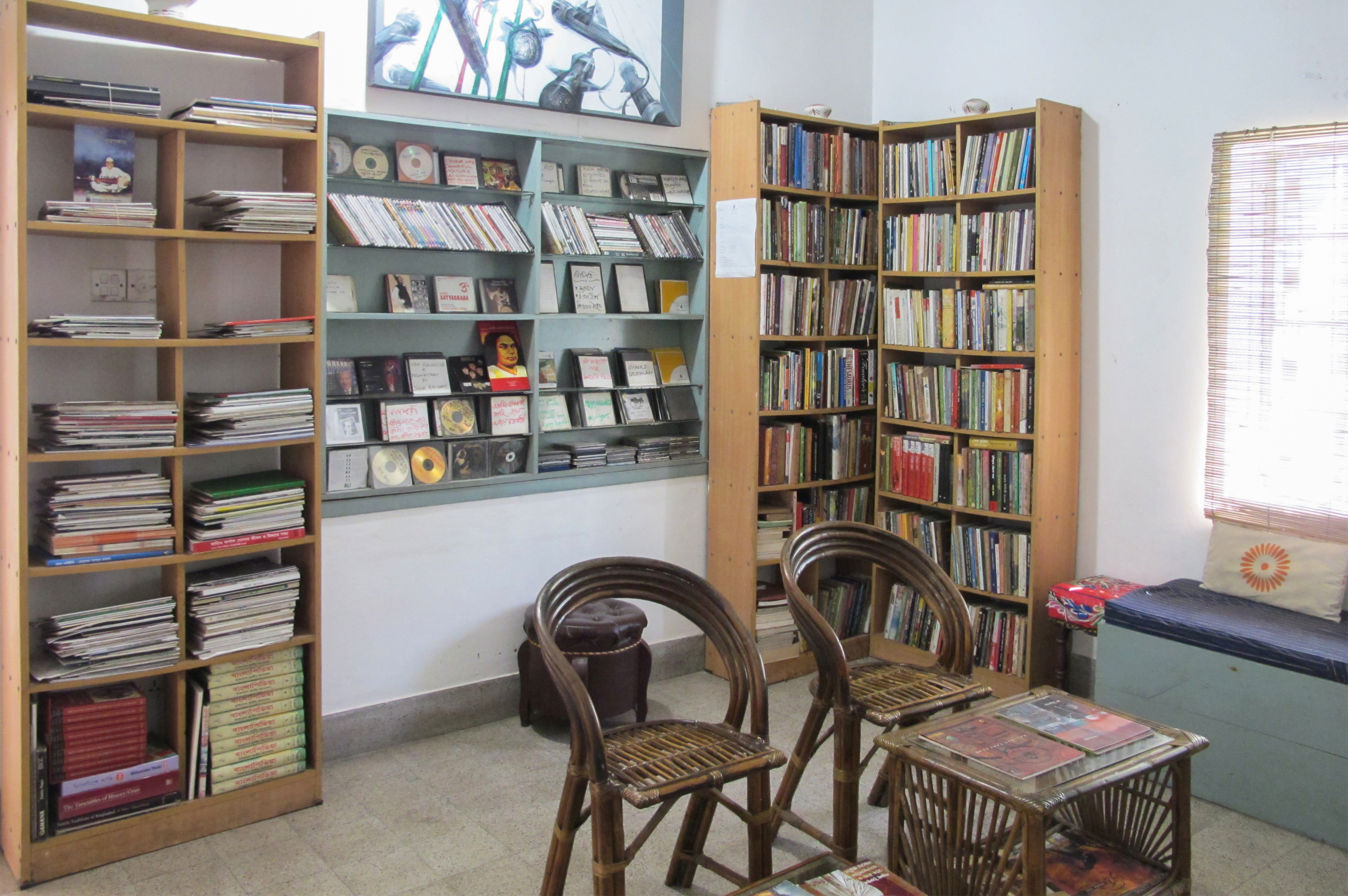

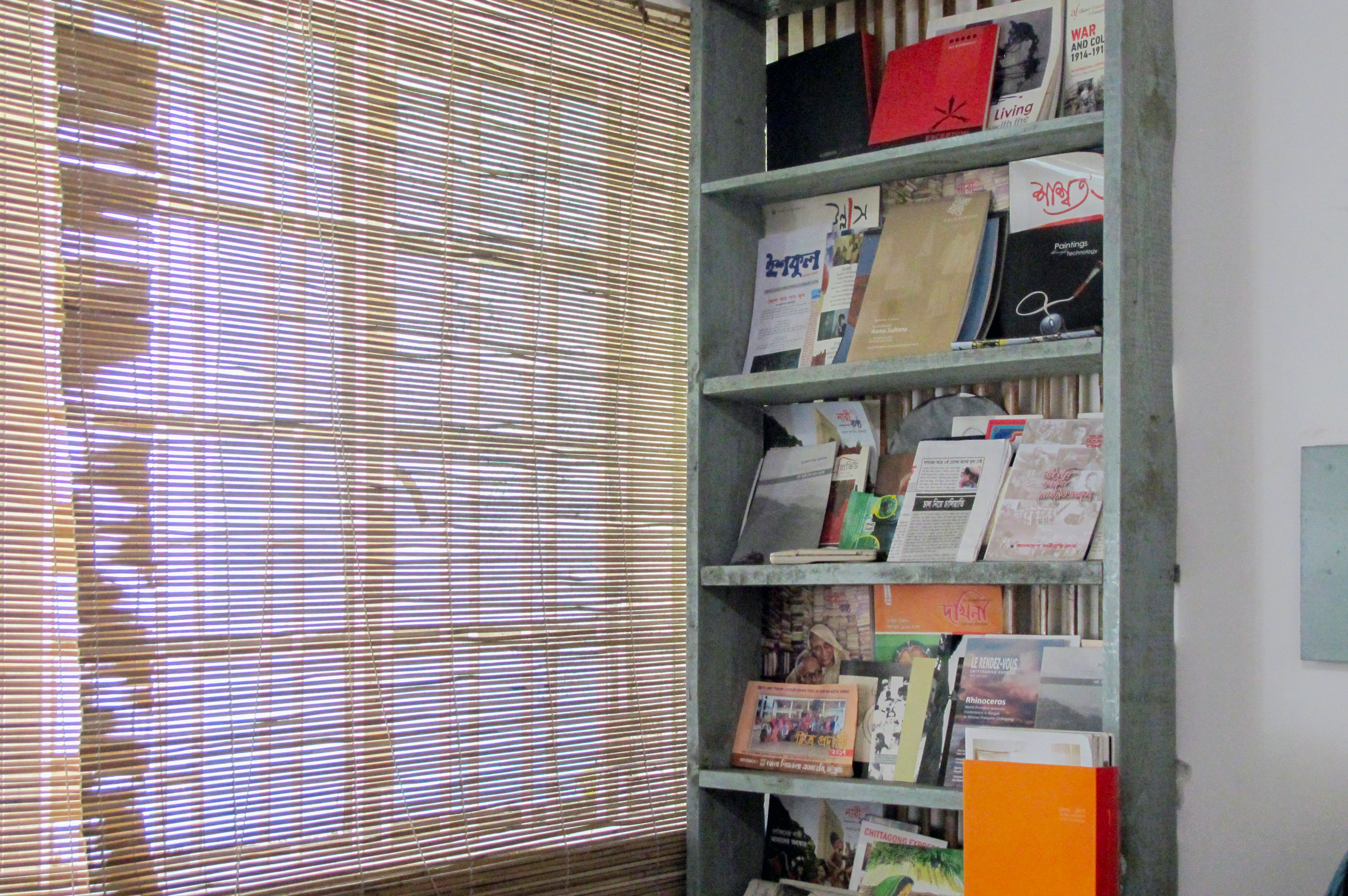

Chatok Cafe

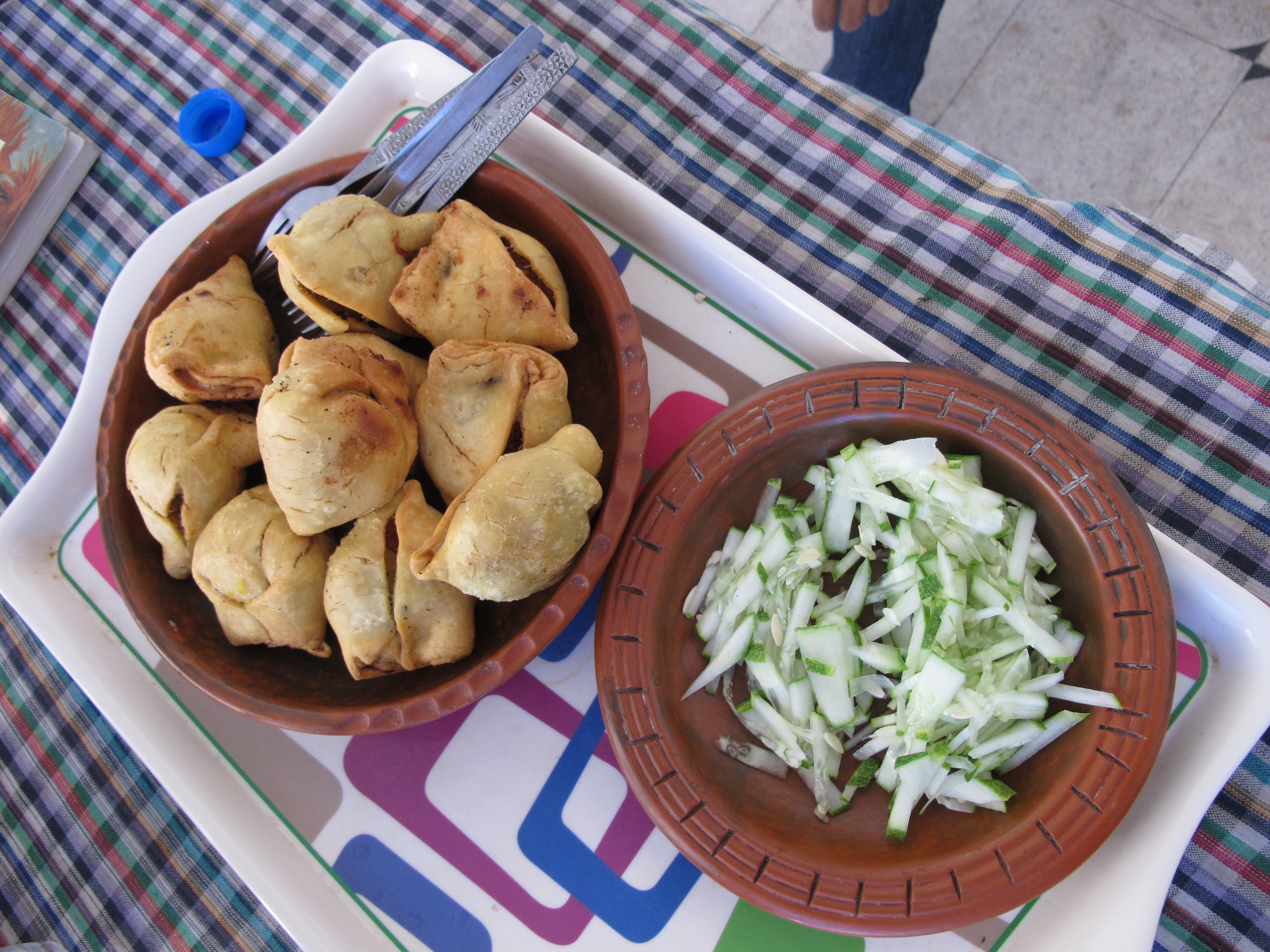
Traditional Singara with salad.
