= Heimrad Bäcker =

Austrian publisher and writer (1925–2003)

Heimrad Bäcker (May 9, 1925 in Vienna - May 8, 2003 in Linz) was an Austrian publisher and writer. The Heimrad-Bäcker-Preis is named after him.
