= Merano Poetry Prize =

Literary prize for German-language poetry

The Merano Poetry Prize (German: Lyrikpreis Meran) is an international literary prize for German-language poetry that was founded by Alfred Gruber (1929–1998), a South Tyrolian catholic priest and writer. The biennial competition was established in 1993 and is awarded by the South Tyrolean provincial government in the city of Merano ever since. In addition to the main award (1. Preis), which is endowed with €8,000, usually two further prizes are awarded, the Alfred Gruber Prize (Alfred-Gruber-Preis, endowed with €3,500) and the Media Prize of the RAI broadcaster South Tyrol (Medienpreis der RAI Südtirol, endowed with €2,500).

The Merano Poetry Prize is considered highly prestigious. The Austrian national public broadcaster ORF called it "one of the most important literary competitions in the German-speaking world ([einer] der wichtigsten Literaturwettbewerbe seiner Gattung im deutschen Sprachraum)".

== Winners ==
- 1993 Kurt Drawert [de]
- 1994 Kathrin Schmidt
- 1996 Sepp Mall
- 1998 Jürgen Nendza
- 2000 Lutz Seiler
- 2002 Oswald Egger [de] and Sylvia Geist
- 2004
  - 1. Prize: Michael Donhauser
  - Alfred Gruber Prize: Jan Wagner
  - Advancement award: Silke Scheuermann
- 2006
  - 1. Prize: Ulrike Almut Sandig
  - Alfred Gruber Prize: Ulf Stolterfoht
  - Media Prize of the RAI broadcaster Bolzano: Andreas Neeser
- 2008
  - 1. Prize: Martina Hefter [de]
  - Alfred Gruber Prize: Monika Rinck
  - Media Prize of the RAI broadcaster Bolzano: Uljana Wolf
  - Preis der Jury: Nikola Richter
- 2010
  - 1. Prize: Andre Rudolph [de]
  - Alfred Gruber Prize: Sünje Lewejohann
  - Media Prize of the RAI broadcaster Bolzano: Carsten Zimmermann
  - Preis der Jury: Christian Rosenau
- 2012
  - 1. Prize: Uwe Kolbe
  - Alfred-Gruber-Preis: Christoph Wenzel
  - Media Prize of the RAI broadcaster Bolzano: Katrin Fellner
- 2014
  - 1. Preis: Thomas Kunst [de]
  - Alfred Gruber Prize: Tom Schulz
  - Media Prize of the RAI broadcaster South Tyrol: Jan Volker Röhnert
- 2016
  - 1. Prize: Konstantin Ames
  - Alfred Gruber Prize: Markus R. Weber
  - Media Prize of the RAI broadcaster South Tyrol: Mikael Vogel
- 2018
  - 1. Prize: Kerstin Preiwuß
  - Alfred Gruber Prize: Martin Piekar
  - Media Prize of the RAI broadcaster South Tyrol: Eberhard Häfner
- 2021
  - 1. Prize: Dagmara Kraus [de]
  - Alfred Gruber Prize: Mara-Daria Cojocaru
  - 3. Preis: Marcus Neuert
- 2022
  - 1. Prize: Guy Helminger
  - Alfred Gruber Prize: Paul-Henri Campbell
  - Media Prize of the RAI broadcaster South Tyrol: Alexandra Bernhardt [de]
- 2024
  - 1. Prize: Tamara Štajner
  - Alfred Gruber Prize: Esther Dischereit [de]
  - Media Prize of the RAI broadcaster South Tyrol: Sebastian Schmidt
- 2026
  - 1. Prize: Heinz Peter Geißler
  - Alfred Gruber Prize: Verica Tričković
  - Media Prize of the RAI broadcaster South Tyrol: Hartwig Mauritz
