= Stiftung Lesen =

German nonprofit organization

- Founded: 1988
- Purpose: Reading and media skills
- Location: Mainz
- Region served: Germany
- Method: Reading for pleasure
- Key people: Joerg F. Maas (CEO)
- Website: http://www.stiftunglesen.de/

Stiftung Lesen (Reading Foundation) is a non-profit organization based in Mainz, Germany under the patronage of Joachim Gauck. Stiftung Lesen acts as a stakeholder for reading promotion on a national and international level. It contributes to reading promotion and reading education through programmes, scientific research, and political recommendations. To create a basis for the development of reading skills, and to enhance the overall level of literacy, Stiftung Lesen established adequate and accessible programmes for every member of society – regardless of financial, cultural or social background. In 2006 Stiftung Lesen established its own Institute for Research on Reading and Media in order to align its projects with the latest scientific findings. The institute is tasked with conducting scientific research on the use of media, reading and reading socialisation, the supervision and evaluation of the foundation's projects and the organisation of conferences on topics concerning literacy and media research (including reading in the digital age), publishing some of its reports for the German government.

== Objective ==
Stiftung Lesen acts as an advocate for reading and media competency in Germany to ensure that every child and adult in Germany develops crucial reading and media skills, and enjoys reading. Stiftung Lesen's initiatives and programmes as well as pilot and research projects complement and build on each other. The programmes support early infant development in the family and nurseries when the basis of reading competency is laid. Older children and teenagers are reached through projects in- and outside school, covering their future development. In addition to the children benefitting directly, actors chaperoning the children's development such as parents, childcare workers, teachers, booksellers and librarians are integrated in the programmes. To promote its activities the foundation has partnered with such well-known organizations as Die Zeit.
