= Die Horen (Morawietz) =

Quarterly journal on literature and art

die horen is a quarterly journal on literature, art and criticism published in Hanover and founded by Kurt Morawietz in 1955.
