= About People =

2021 novel by Juli Zeh

- German hardcover edition
- Author: Juli Zeh
- Original title: Über Menschen
- Translator: Alta L. Price
- Language: German
- Set in: Berlin and Brandenburg, Germany
- Publisher: Luchterhand Literaturverlag
- Publication date: 22 March 2021
- Publication place: Germany
- English publication date: 3 October 2023
- Media type: Print, audiobook
- Pages: 416
- ISBN: 978-3-630-87667-2

About People (German: Über Menschen) is a novel by the German writer Juli Zeh, published in 2021 by Luchterhand Literaturverlag. It was published in English translation in 2023. Set during the initial wave of the COVID-19 pandemic in Germany, it is about a woman who leaves Berlin and begins to integrate in the community of a Brandenburg village.

About People was a bestseller in Germany. Critics wrote that it stresses the human and undermines the ideological in relation to the pandemic and differences between contemporary city and country life. It was compared to Zeh's 2016 novel Unterleuten, which has a similar setting.

== Plot ==
Dora is in her mid-30s, works in advertising and lives in Berlin's Kreuzberg district with her boyfriend. The boyfriend is first caught up in the climate movement, and, when the COVID-19 pandemic hits the country, in strict and preachy demands for people to stay indoors and observe social distancing. When he forbids Dora from taking her usual long walks, she has had enough and moves to the house she recently bought in the Brandenburg village of Bracken.

Dora tentatively gets to know the locals in an area, where the support for immigration restriction is strong and racial jokes are commonplace, in contrast to the life she has been used to. Her closest neighbour, named Gottfried but nicknamed Gote, is a neo-Nazi and occasionally violent, which initially shocks her, but by socialising with him and his ten-year-old daughter, she develops a friendship with the man, who helps her by crafting furniture and also turns out to have a brain tumor. Dora comes to scrutinise herself and the people around her, who in various ways view themselves as superior people while being irritated at others who think the same about themselves.

== Publication ==
Luchterhand Literaturverlag published the book on 22 March 2021. The English translation by Alta L. Price was published by World Editions on 3 October 2023.

== Reception ==
About People was a bestseller in Germany. Several critics wrote that it stresses human qualities and compared it to Zeh's 2016 novel Unterleuten, which has a similar setting and title, but a larger cast of characters and multiple perspectives.

Ronald Düker of Die Zeit wrote that the book was published on the anniversary of the first German covid lockdown and can be read as a contribution to a public debate, in the form of a story with much humanity. Andrea Diener of the Frankfurter Allgemeine Zeitung wrote that it is possible to project a lot of contemporary politics on the novel, but that it benefits if you refrain from it, writing that it neither will disappoint Zeh's admirers nor win over her critics. Judith von Sternburg of the Frankfurter Rundschau called the book quick-witted, fast-paced and entertaining, especially in its ironic and relaxed first part. She wrote that the contemporaneity of its subjects works well with its humour but is somewhat contradicted by its use of "TV tragicomedy dramaturgy".

Jörg Magenau of the Süddeutsche Zeitung wrote that the first third is brilliant in the way it shows how "the crisis-oriented consciousness" already was well prepared to position itself as moral when COVID-19 hit. Magenau praised Zeh's dialogue and wrote that she cleverly undermines what initially seems like clichés of a clueless city girl and a "village Nazi", which results in portrayals that are human and not ideological. Dietmar Jacobsen wrote for Literaturkritik.de that the book's differences compared to Unterleuten result in more clichés but also a greater closeness to nature and more clear communication. He wrote that the book provides insight about how ideological views of people only are possible from a distance. Elke Schmitter of Der Spiegel called About People a modern Heimatroman, characterised by a contrast between anxiety-inducing "city air" and healthy but sometimes involuntarily communal "country air". She wrote that the storytelling is skillful and executed with a clarity that is reminiscent of young adult fiction, but with pointed dialogues, irony, anger and a stoicism that is "the contemporary mood for an eastern German regional novel".

In 2023, Necia Chronister of Kansas State University described About People and Zeh's next novel Zwischen Welten as works that "encourage sympathy with rightwing extremists". Chronister wrote that Zeh had been an enfant terrible since the outbreak of the COVID-19 pandemic, which also had renewed interest in her 2009 dystopian novel The Method, which is set in a health dictatorship, leading Chronister to ask: "What do we do with Juli Zeh?"
