= Maria Holl =

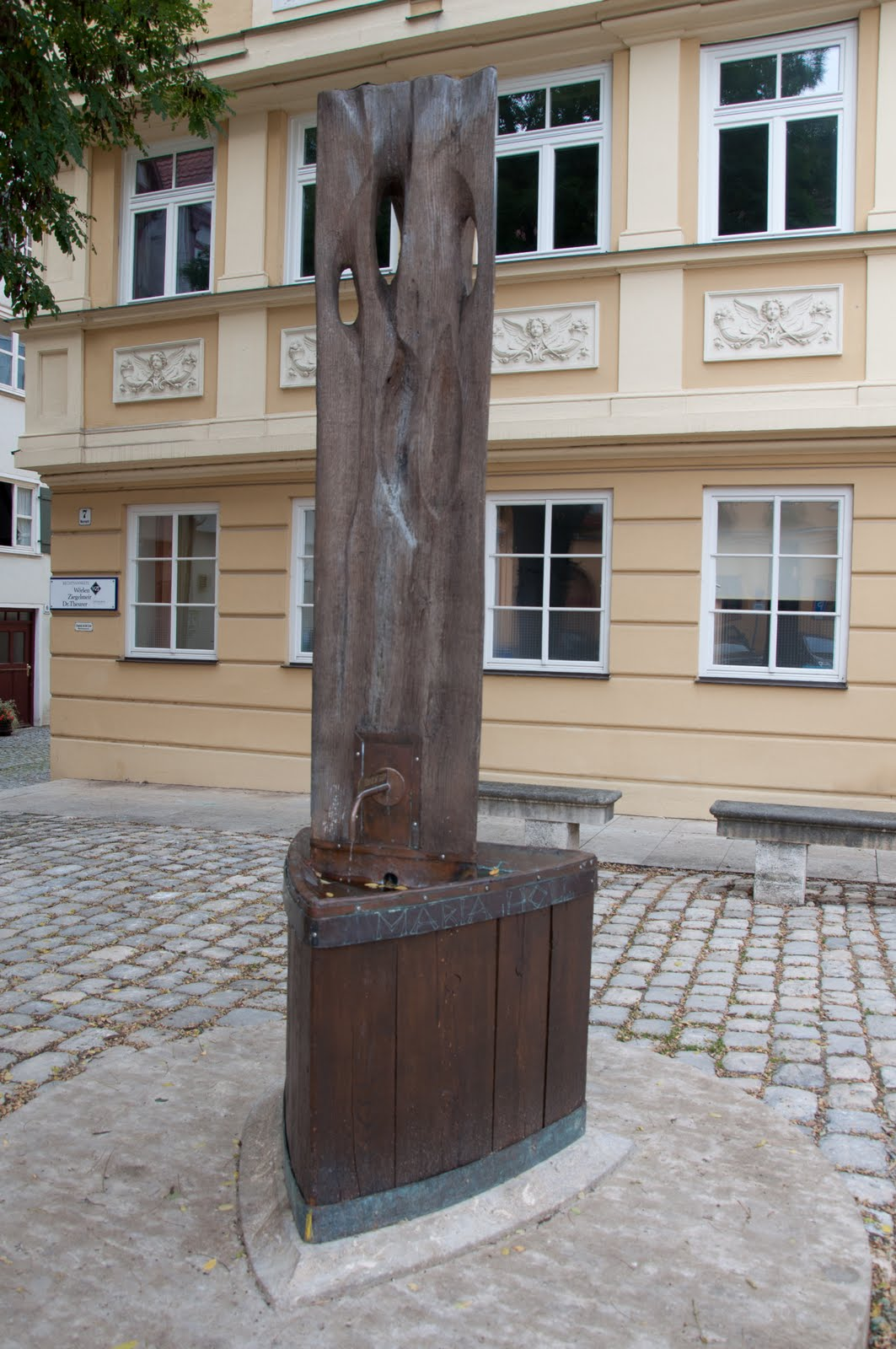
- Fountain dedicated to Maria Holl, in Nördlingen
- Born: 1549; Altenstadt, near Geislingen an der Steige, Germany
- Died: 1634 (aged 84–85)

Maria Holl (1549–1634) was an inn-keeper in Nördlingen who was accused of witchcraft. After undergoing severe torture, she was acquitted of all charges against her. She was one of the few who survived the trials. She is one of those accredited to putting a stop to the witch hunt in her generation. Several books have been written tracing her life and trial.

== Early life ==
Maria was born 1549 in Altenstadt, near Geislingen an der Steige. She was the daughter of the bailiff Jerg Löhlin from Altenstadt. Maria married Michael Holl on 20 May 1586, in Ulm Minster. She moved with her husband to Nördlingen, where she became a resident on 30 May 1587.

== Career and trial ==
In 1586 Maria and Michael opened the zur Golden Krone (The Golden Crown) in the Nördlingen's wine market at the cost of 2306 florin. As the business grew successful, she was accused of witchcraft out of envy. It was Maria Marb, who implicated several women including Barbara Lierheimer and Maria Holl of witchcraft when she was tortured.

After her accusation in 1593, Holl was tortured 62 times. Despite the inflictions, she refused to confess being in connivance with the devil. In addition, she continued to profess her faith in the Christian God. A few years ago, Rebecca Lemp too had undergone the same ordeal and broke under torture to give a false confession. Lemp was then burnt at the stake with her family in the crowd as witnesses.

Sebastian Röttinger was one among those who tortured Holl and several others. Victims of witch hunt and subsequent trials in Nördlingen included the rich and powerful, not just poor women. Four of these were widows of city councillors, and one of these four was the widow of a mayor. These probably provided urgency the change the legal dispositions as these women were from the social circle of the interrogators themselves.

Many citizens of Nördlingen continued to show their support for Holl. The clergy then came forward to prohibit the continuance of the torture. The people of Ulm, Holl's native town interceded for her with the diet. Her prosecutors finally yielded to the pressure. She was cleared of all accusations on 11 October 1594.

She was among the last people to be tried for witchcraft, in Nördlingen, and amongst the few who survived the trial. Seventeen other women survived their torture to prove their innocence during this period.

== Death ==
Holl outlived all her tormentors and was married three times. On 22 September 1634, she was buried after the devastating Battle of Nördlingen. She probably died from the plague.

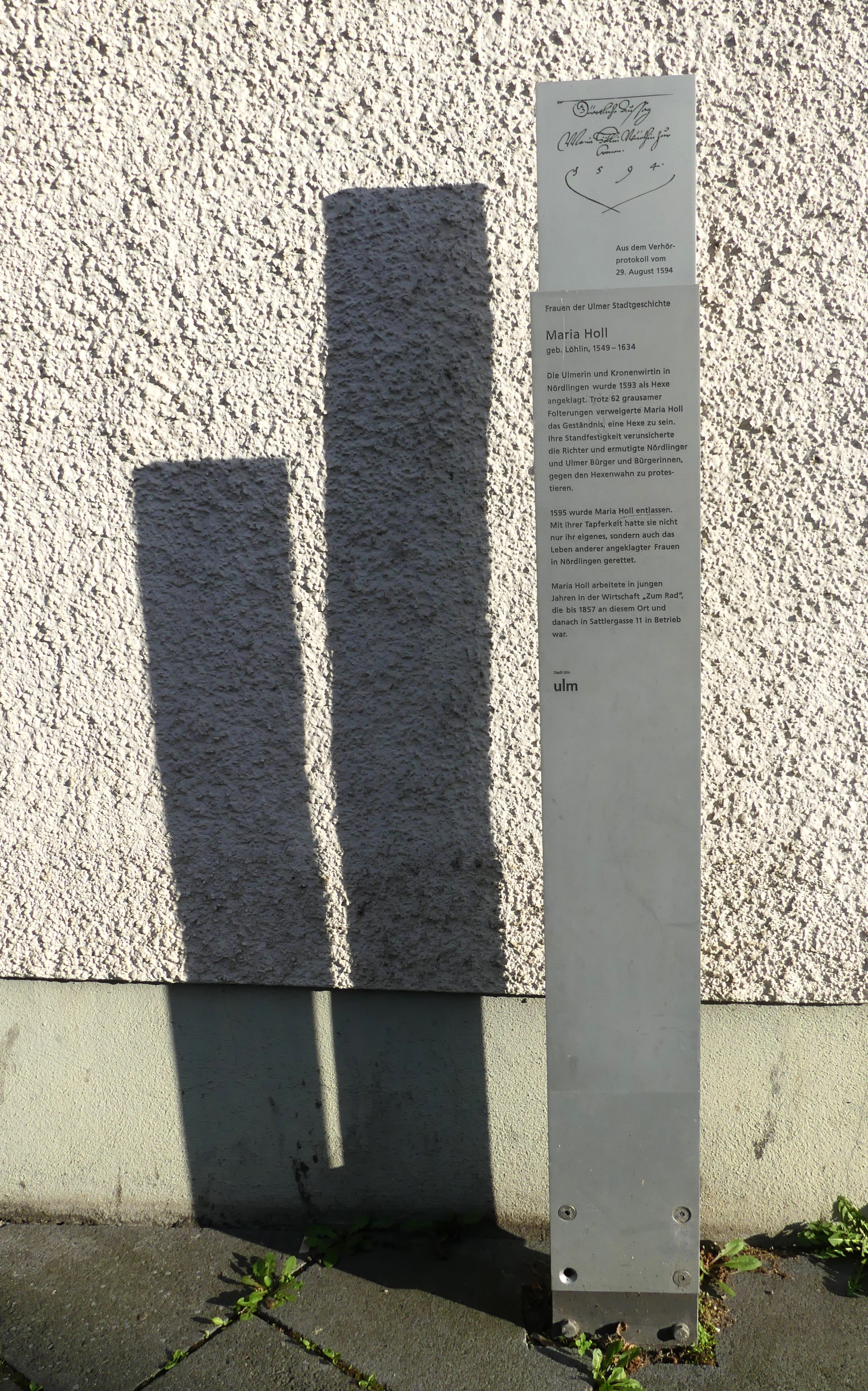
Memorial stele for Maria Holm in Ulm in Sattlergasse, Ulm.

== Commemorations ==
On the wall for the former zur Golden Krone, on Weinmarkt 8, Nördlingen, an information panel installed reads,

"The innkeeper of the Krone, Maria Holl (c. 1549-1634), was imprisoned as a suspected witch on November 2, 1593, and released on October 11, 1594, after 62 torture sessions. Her steadfastness led to a decline in the witch craze in Nördlingen."

In 1966 a wooden fountain was installed with donation from Emil Eigner. The design intended to evoke a pyre. In 2010 the fountain was restored by the Wilburgstetten sculptor Rudolf Siegmayer, with donations from the Alt Nördlingen association. The inscription reads, 'In memory of the steadfast Maria Holl.'

== Academic literature ==
=== In German ===
- Behringer, Wolfgang (1997). Hexenverfolgung in Bayern: Volksmagie, Glaubenseifer und Staatsräson in der Frühen Neuzeit (in German). München: R. Oldenbourg. ISBN 3-486-53903-5. OCLC 39265902.
- Gloria Eschbaumer, Der ehrbare Rat der Stadt Nördlingen im Hexenprozess 1593/94 gegen die Kronenwirtin Maria Holl. Greno, Nördlingen 1983.
- Gloria Rüdel-Eschbaumer, Mit Originalprotokollen aus dem Stadtarchiv Nördlingen vom Jahre 1593/94. Steinmeier, Nördlingen 1998, ISBN 3-927496-53-7.
- Sonja Kinzler, 'Wie die „Hexe“ Maria Holl zu ihrem Ruhm kam,' In: Dokumentation (= ). Band 15. Verlag Riesener Kulturtage, Nördlingen 2005, ISBN 3-923373-59-7, S. 205–211.
- Sonja Kinzler, Die Rezeption der Nördlinger Hexenprozesse im 19. und 20. Jahrhundert. Steinmeier, Nördlingen 2005, ISBN 3-936363-27-7.
- Dietmar-H. Voges, 'Gesichtspunkte ihrer historischen Bewertung,' In: Dietmar-H. Voges (Hrsg.), Aus dem Leben einer Stadt. Beck, München 1997, ISBN 978-3-406-43360-3, S. 46–88 und 408–415.

== In popular culture ==
Lore Sporhan-Krempel's [de] 1949 novel Die Hexe von Nördlingen: Das Schicksal der Maria Holl (en: The Witch of Nördlingen: The Fate of Maria Holl. A Novel) is based on Holl's life. While Sporhan-Krempel's husband was serving in the military, she conducted archival research in Nördlingen and published a serialised novel in the Stuttgarter Neue Tagblat. This was later transformed into the 1949 novel.

In 1998 Frank Grupe also based his novel Maria Holl – Hexenjagd in Nördlingen on Holl's life. Based on this revised version, several plays have been performed across Europe.

The main character in Juli Zeh's Corpus Delicti: Ein Prozess (2009) is named Mia Holl after Maria Holl. The English translation was published as The Method in 2012 by W. F. Howes. Linda Teasedale-Rose wrote a fictional reimagining of the life of Holl, Hexe: The Ordeals of Maria Holl (2013). Drawing from historical records of the trail, and published by Rosedale House, it covers the early life, trial, imprisonment, and torture.

== See also ==
- Eichstätt witch trials
- Trier witch trials
- Fulda witch trials
- Catelijne Verbauwen
- Martha Corey
