= Ellwangen witch trial =

The Ellwangen witch trial took place in the Catholic Prince Bishopric of Ellwangen between 1611 and 1618. It was preceded by a first witch trial in 1588. The first witch trial led to the death of 17/20 people, and the second led to the death of 430, making the number of deaths to about 450 in total.

== History ==
The witch trial occurred in a religiously unstable area and was instigated by the initiative of the authorities. In April 1611, a woman was arrested accused of having blasphemed the communion. Under torture, she was pressed to admit witch craft and point out her accomplices. The alleged accomplices were arrested and, in turn, forced to confess and point out their accomplices. The prince Bishop formed a witch commission and changed the law, which made it easier to handle witch trials. By 1618, the witch trial had led to a demographic imbalance, an instable economy and a lack of trust on the legal system.

An example of interrogation and sentencing records, 82 pages, can be found in archives Ludwigsburg B 389 Bü 700 (see sources). These records included Elisabeth Schott, an old woman from Eggenrot, Ellwangen, the widow of Leonhardt Schott. She was subject to dungeon, torture, and execution in Ellwangen; burned on June 18, 1611 with five additional women from Ellwangen.

== Aftermath ==
The Ellwangen witch trial was later used as a role model for the great Bamberg witch trials, the Würzburg witch trial and the Eichstätt witch trials. The last witch trial in Ellwangen occurred in 1694. In 2001, a memorial was founded for the victims of the Ellwangen witch trial.
