= Decompression (novel) =

2012 novel by Juli Zeh

- Author: Juli Zeh
- Original title: Nullzeit
- Translator: John Cullen
- Language: German
- Publisher: Schöffling & Co.
- Publication date: 2012
- Publication place: Germany
- English publication date: 2014
- Pages: 256
- ISBN: 978-3-89561-436-1

Decompression (German: Nullzeit) is a novel by the German writer Juli Zeh, published in 2012 by Schöffling & Co.

== Plot ==
Sven Fielder is a German diving instructor who runs a tourist business in Lanzarote with his lover Antje Berger. Their everyday lives turn complicated when Sven is hired by the actress Jola von der Pahlen, who needs to improve her diving skills to get the leading role in an upcoming film about Lotte Hass, and her abusive husband Theo Hast, a writer whose only novel was published ten years earlier. The story is mainly told from Sven's perspective, along with entries from Jola's diary.

== Reception ==
Lucy Popescu of The Independent wrote that Decompression builds suspension in ways that surprise the reader by changing direction. She complimented Zeh's ability to describe "the carelessness and perversities of the rich and famous". James Smart of The Guardian wrote that the unsympathetic main characters make the truth of what is going on feel irrelevant, but that the passages set underwater are well written and the book ends with "a scene of splendid drama". Kirkus Reviews wrote that the story developments are unpredictable and well put together, the book suspenseful and the characters nuanced, comparing Jola's and Theo's relationship to that of Martha and George in Who's Afraid of Virginia Woolf? Publishers Weekly called Decompression "a competent character study" about Sven's vulnerability and inability to handle the unexpected situation.
