= New Year (novel) =

2018 novel by Juli Zeh

- Author: Juli Zeh
- Original title: Neujahr
- Translator: Alta L. Price
- Language: German
- Publisher: Luchterhand Literaturverlag
- Publication date: 10 September 2018
- Publication place: Germany
- English publication date: 2 November 2021
- Pages: 192
- ISBN: 978-3630875729

New Year (German: Neujahr) is a 2018 novel by the German writer Juli Zeh.

== Plot ==
The novel is set on New Year's Day and takes place during a bicycle ride up a mountain slope on the island of Lanzarote, as the cyclist Henning reviews his own life, which feels increasingly alien to him. Henning is on a winter vacation with his family and has recurring panic attack. His wife Theresa accuses him of being insufficient due to his neurotic personality and flirted with a Frenchman at the New Year's dinner the night before. Their two young children prefer their mother, despite that Henning spends more time with them. The exhausting bicycle ride makes him hallucinate and reminisce about his childhood in search for a possible origin of his struggles.

== Reception ==
Karin Janker of the Süddeutsche Zeitung wrote that the book portrays "the overwhelmed father", who is comparable but distinct from "the overwhelmed lover", "the overwhelmed artist" and "the overwhelmed city dweller" found in 19th-century novels. Janker said the novel is about an identity crisis in the wake of lost certainties, and that it "shows the emancipated society what it would rather not see: that even those who are at the forefront of emancipation can overwhelm themselves when they try to live several lives at the same time". Kirkus Reviews called the book a "spine-tingler" that portrays "a spectacularly hallucinatory middle-aged crisis".

== Adaptation ==
The novel was adapted into the play Neujahr, written by Elisa Hempel and Dariusch Yazdkhasti. It was directed by Yazdkhasti in a production for the Theater Bielefeld that starred Lukas Graser and Leona Grundig. It premiered on 21 November 2019.
