= Empty Heart =

Empty Heart may refer to:

== Music ==
- "Empty Heart", The Rolling Stones from Five by Five (The Rolling Stones EP) and 12 X 5, 1964
- "Empty Heart", Willy DeVille from Backstreets of Desire, 1992
- "Empty Heart", Alison Krauss from Forget About It, 1999
- Empty Heart, Deva Premal from Satsang, 2002
- "Empty Heart", Sahara Hotnights from Kiss & Tell, 2004
- "Empty Hearts", As I Lay Dying on Shadows Are Security, 2005
- "Empty Heart", Grace Potter from Midnight, 2015
- "Empty Heart", The Dead Daisies from Revolución, 2015
- "Empty Heart", Rick Astley from Beautiful Life, 2018
- "Empty Heart", Derez De'Shon from Bigger Than Me, 2022
- Empty Heart, Loaded Gun, 2006 debut album by American rock band Re:Ignition
- The Empty Hearts, American garage rock supergroup
- "Karanokokoro" (カラノココロ; lit. 'Empty Heart') performed by Anly

== Other ==
- Empty Hearts, 1924 silent film by Alfred Santell
- Empty Hearts (novel), 2017 novel by Juli Zeh
