= Empty Hearts (novel) =

2017 novel by Juli Zeh

- Author: Juli Zeh
- Original title: Leere Herzen
- Translator: John Cullen
- Language: German
- Publisher: Luchterhand Literaturverlag
- Publication date: November 2017
- Publication place: Germany
- English publication date: 2019
- Pages: 320
- ISBN: 9783630875231

Empty Hearts (German: Leere Herzen) is a novel by the German writer Juli Zeh, published in 2017 by Luchterhand Literaturverlag.

== Plot ==
Empty Hearts is set in a near future where the European Union is breaking apart and a vapid populist party is in the German government. The business woman Britta is the founder and CEO of The Bridge, a Braunschweig-based company that finds desperate people through algorithms and online data harvesting and matches them with terrorist groups in need of suicide bombers. When Britta and her business partner Babak hear of a suicide attack they had nothing to do with, they act in response to their competition and become entangled with another entrepreneur, Guido Hatz.

== Reception ==
Jacqueline Thör of Die Zeit wrote that Zeh cleverly portrayed the contradictions of the society she lives in and called Empty Hearts the German equivalent of Submission by Michel Houellebecq. She wrote that the novel's structure is "experimental" but criticised the language and narrative style for relying too much on rhetorical devices and rapid, direct speech.

Adam Sternbergh of The New York Times called the novel "chilling in the accuracy of its satire and chilling in its diagnosis of our modern malaise" and wrote that it is not facile like it first may appear.

== Adaptation ==
A stage adaptation played at the E.T.A.-Hoffmann-Theater in Bamberg in 2019.
