= Ilija Trojanow =

German novelist, translator and nonfiction writer

- Илия Троянов
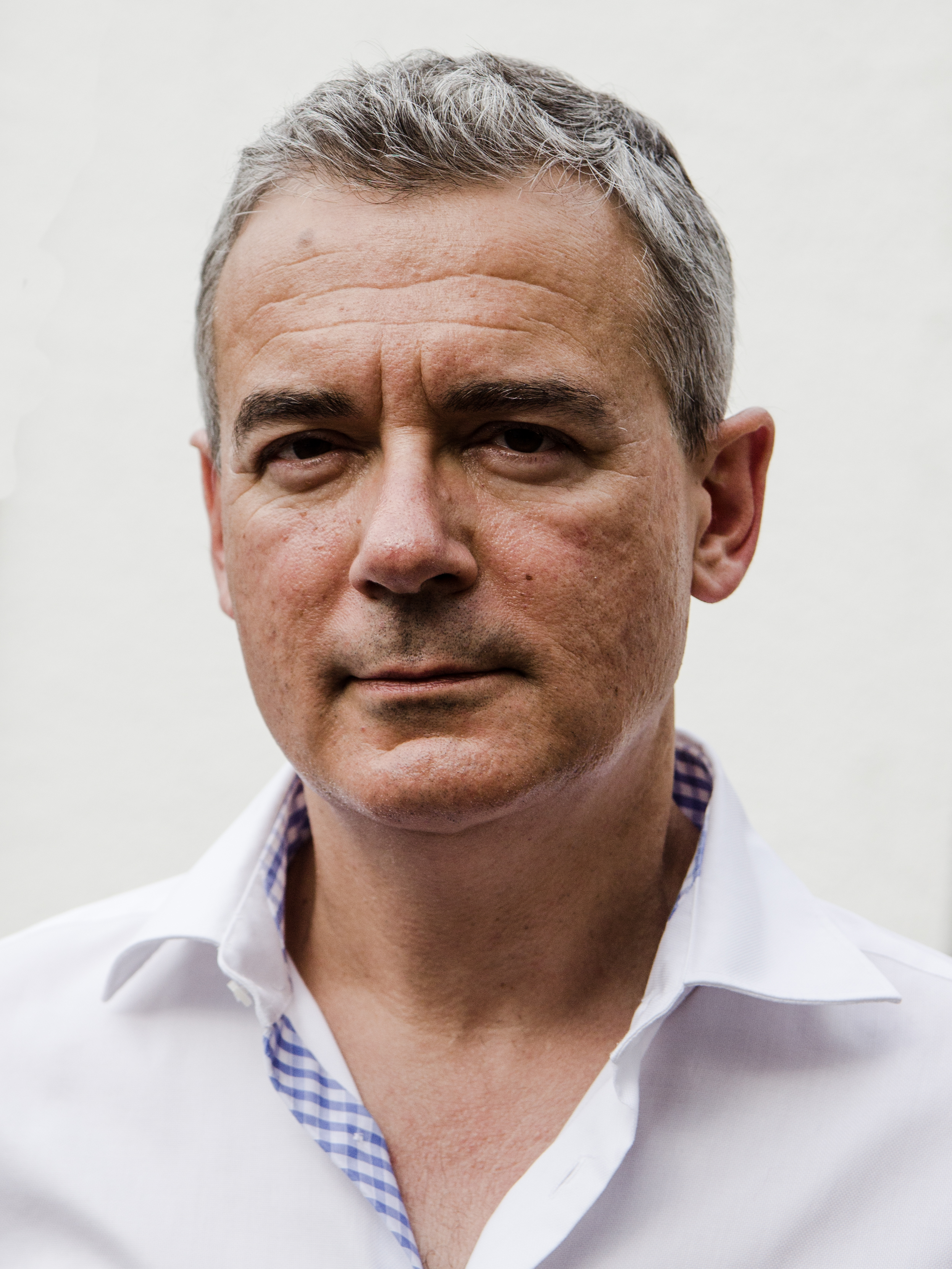
- Ilija Trojanow at the Leselenz Hausach 2015
- Born: Iliya Marinov Troyanov; 23 August 1965 (age 61); Sofia, Bulgaria
- Education: LMU Munich
- Occupations: Writer; translator; publisher

Ilija Trojanow (Bulgarian: Илия Маринов Троянов, romanized: Iliya Marinov Troyanov; born 23 August 1965), also transliterated as Ilya Troyanov, is a Bulgarian-German writer, translator and publisher.

== Life and literary career ==
Trojanow was born in Sofia, People's Republic of Bulgaria in 1965. In 1971, his family fled Bulgaria through the SFR Yugoslavia and Italy to West Germany, where they received political asylum. In 1972, the family travelled on to Kenya, where Ilija's father Marin had obtained a job as engineer. With one interruption from 1977 to 1981, Ilija Trojanow lived in Nairobi until 1984, and attended the German School Nairobi. After a stay in Paris, he studied law and ethnology at LMU Munich from 1985 to 1989. He interrupted these studies to found Kyrill-und-Method-Verlag in 1989, and after that Marino-Verlag in 1992, both of which specialised in African literature. In 1999 Trojanow moved to Mumbai and became intensely involved with Indian life and culture. He has lived in Cape Town, returned to Germany (Mainz), and then to Austria, where he currently resides in Vienna.

In the 1990s Trojanow wrote several non-fiction and travel books about Africa, published an anthology of contemporary African literature and translated African authors into German. His first novel, Die Welt ist groß und Rettung lauert überall, appeared in 1996. In it he recounts his family's experiences as political refugees and asylum seekers. After that appeared the science fiction novel Autopol, created on the Internet as a "novel in progress," Hundezeiten, a travel account of a visit to his Bulgarian homeland, and books dealing with his experiences in India. His reportage Zu den heiligen Quellen des Islam describes a pilgrimage to Mecca.

Since 2002, Ilija Trojanow has been member of the PEN centre of Germany. Among other awards he received the Bertelsmann Literature Prize at the Ingeborg Bachmann competition in Klagenfurt in 1995, the Marburg Literature Prize in 1996, the Thomas Valentin Prize in 1997, the Adelbert von Chamisso Prize in 2000 and the Leipzig Book Fair Prize in the category of fiction for his novel Der Weltensammler. In 2015, he was awarded the 10-week London scholarship from the German Literature Fund, as Writer-in-Residence at Queen Mary University of London.

Published in English as The Collector of Worlds in 2006, this novel was inspired by the biography and travel writings of British colonial officer Richard Francis Burton, some of whose travels Trojanow followed to places in present-day India, Saudi Arabia or Tanzania.

In 2014, Trojanow participated in the writer in residence programme of the one world foundation in Sri Lanka.

== Miscellaneous ==
In 2013, Trojanow, who has also written on freedom of expression and surveillance of citizens by government agencies in Germany, had criticized the National Security Agency (NSA). In the same year, he was denied entry into the US for undisclosed reasons. He planned to attend an academic conference. Upon intervention by representatives of the P.E.N. and the German cultural institution Goethe-Institut, he could finally travel to New York at the end of 2013.

== Works ==
- In Afrika, Munich, 1993 (with Michael Martin)
- Naturwunder Ostafrika, Munich, 1994 (with Michael Martin)
- Hüter der Sonne (Custodians of the Sun), Munich, 1996 (with Chenjerai Hove)
- Kenia mit Nordtansania, Munich, 1996
- Die Welt ist groß und Rettung lauert überall, Munich, 1996
- Autopol, Munich, 1997
- Zimbabwe, Munich, 1998
- Hundezeiten, Munich, 1999
- Der Sadhu an der Teufelswand, Munich, 2001
- An den inneren Ufern Indiens (Along the Ganges), Munich, 2003
- Zu den heiligen Quellen des Islam (Mumbai to Mecca), Munich, 2004
- Der Weltensammler (The Collector of Worlds), Munich, 2006
- Indien. Land des kleinen Glücks, Cadolzburg, 2006
- Gebrauchsanweisung für Indien, Munich, 2006
- Die fingierte Revolution. Bulgarien, eine exemplarische Geschichte, Munich, 2006
- Nomade auf vier Kontinenten, Frankfurt, 2007
- Kampfabsage. Kulturen bekämpfen sich nicht – sie fließen zusammen, Munich, 2007 (with Ranjit Hoskote)
- Der entfesselte Globus, Munich, 2008
- Sehnsucht, Freiburg, 2008 (edited by Fatma Sagir)
- Kumbh Mela. Das größte Fest der Welt, München 2008 (photographs by Thomas Dorn)
- Angriff auf die Freiheit. Sicherheitswahn, Überwachungsstaat und der Abbau bürgerlicher Rechte, Munich 2009 (with Juli Zeh)
- EisTau, Munich, 2011 (novel)
- Die Versuchungen der Fremde: Unterwegs in Arabien, Indien und Afrika, Munich, 2011
- Confluences: Forgotten Histories From East And West (co-authored with Ranjit Hoskote), New Delhi, Yoda Press 2012 ISBN 978-81-906186-7-0
- Der überflüssige Mensch, Salzburg, 2013
- Macht und Widerstand, Frankfurt am Main 2015
- Meine Olympiade, Frankfurt am Main, 2016
- Nach der Flucht, Frankfurt am Main, 2017
- Doppelte Spur, Frankfurt am Main: Fischer, 2020, ISBN 978-3-10-491203-5

=== English translations ===
- Custodians of the Sun
- Along the Ganges, translation by Ranjit Hoskote, Penguin Books India & Haus Publishing, 2005
- Mumbai to Mecca, London, 2007, Haus Publishing
- The Collector of Worlds, London, 2008
- The Lamentations of Zeno, translation by Philip Boehm of Eis Tau, Verso Books, New York, 2016

== Publishing ==
- Afrikanissimo, Wuppertal, 1991 (with Peter Ripken)
- Das Huhn das schreit gehört dem Fremden (The screaming Chicken belongs to the Stranger), Munich, 1998
- Döner in Walhalla (Doner in Valhalla), Cologne, 2000
- Die Welt des Ryszard Kapuściński. Seine besten Geschichten und Reportagen, Frankfurt, 2007
- Egon Erwin Kisch. Die schönsten Geschichten und Reportagen, Berlin, 2008

== Translations into German ==
- Sobornost. Kirche, Bibel, Tradition (Bible, church, tradition) by Georgij V. Florovskij, Munich 1989
- Der Berg am Rande des Himmels (The Mountain on the Edge of the Sky) by Timothy Wangusa, Munich, 1989
- Knochen (Bones) by Chenjerai Hove, Munich, 1990
- Der Preis der Freiheit (The Price of Freedom) by Tsitsi Dangarembga, Reinbek bei Hamburg, 1991
- Buckingham Palace (Buckingham Palace, district six) by Richard Rive, Munich 1994
- Die Sklaverei der Gewürze by Shafi Adam Shafi, Munich 1997
- Der letzte Ausweis (Identity card) by F. M. Esfandiary, Frankfurt, 2009

== Film adaptations ==
- The World is Big and Salvation Lurks Around the Corner, 2007, directed by Stefan Komandarev with Miki Manojlovic as Bai Dan and Carlo Ljubek as Alexander
