= Alles auf dem Rasen =

2006 book by Juli Zeh

- Author: Juli Zeh
- Language: German
- Publisher: Schöffling & Co.
- Publication date: 2006
- Publication place: Germany
- Pages: 296
- ISBN: 978-3-89561-059-2

Alles auf dem Rasen (lit. 'Everything on the Lawn') is a collection of essays and articles that Juli Zeh produced for German newspapers in the period 2000–2005. It was published by Schöffling & Co. in 2006.

== Summary ==
Alles auf dem Rasen consists of texts the German author and lawyer Juli Zeh wrote from 2000 to 2005, originally published in periodicals such as Der Spiegel, Die Zeit and Die Welt. The essays and articles comment on politics, society, law, writing and travel. The title occurs in an essay about pornography in art and comes from a line in a Die Toten Hosen song: "Ficken, Bumsen, Blasen / Alles auf dem Rasen" (transl. Fucking, banging, sucking / The full monty).

== Reception ==
Michael Schmitt of Deutschlandfunk wrote that although the texts were comments on topical issues, many remain relevant and work as companions to Zeh's novels. He wrote that the book is characterised by wit and bluntness, without becoming provocative in the vein of Botho Strauss or Martin Walser. He said it is consistent and shows a preference for processes over the belief in a great truth. Enno Stahl of Die Tageszeitung cites the book as an example of how Zeh's political analyses are firmly rooted in Realpolitik.
