= Angriff auf die Freiheit =

2009 book by Ilija Trojanow and Juli Zeh

Angriff auf die Freiheit. Sicherheitswahn, Überwachungsstaat und der Abbau bürgerlicher Rechte
- Author: Ilija Trojanow; Juli Zeh
- Language: German
- Publisher: Carl Hanser Verlag
- Publication date: 2009
- Publication place: Germany
- Pages: 176
- ISBN: 9783446234185

Angriff auf die Freiheit. Sicherheitswahn, Überwachungsstaat und der Abbau bürgerlicher Rechte (lit. 'Attack on Freedom. Security Madness, Surveillance State and the Dismantling of Civil Rights') is a 2009 book by the German writers Ilija Trojanow and Juli Zeh.

== Summary ==
Over 11 chapters and a 30-page appendix, the authors cover the history of civil rights and their disappearance due to increased surveillance. The surveillance is driven by banks who keep track of transactions, IT companies who can access communication, private businesses who benefit from collecting data, criminals who commit fraud and states who use it to identify potential terrorists. The book argues against the idea that increased state surveillance leads to more security, because it only moves the threat from terrorists to the state itself, and the damage from state-sponsored terror has always exceeded the one from non-state actors. The authors argue that they do not live in a democracy and that freedom depends on an attitude where people understand that laws actually apply to them, not only to terrorists.

== Reception ==
Mirko Smiljanic of Deutschlandfunk calls the book "an angry pamphlet" certain to shake up readers. He says it "says loud and clear what has been known for years", but unfortunately does not provide an answer to how people can protect themselves against surveillance, lacks analysis of how surveillance changes a society, and does not address whether it can be prevented with democratic means. Milos Vec of the Frankfurter Allgemeine Zeitung says it is not subtle and contains nothing new, and its message may have been more powerful if given a literary treatment, bringing up Zeh's own dystopian novel The Method (2009) as an example of that. As a polemical treatment of the subject, Vec says it is inferior to Dietmar Kammerer's Bilder der Überwachung, published the year before.
