= Unterleuten: The Torn Village =

2020 television serial

- Genre: Drama
- Based on: Unterleuten by Juli Zeh
- Screenplay by: Magnus Vattrodt
- Directed by: Matti Geschonneck
- Composer: Matthias Weber
- Country of origin: Germany
- Original language: German
- No. of episodes: 3

Production
- Producer: Reinhold Elschot; Silke Schulze-Erdel
- Cinematography: Theo Bierkens
- Editor: Eva Schnare
- Running time: 270 minutes

Original release
- Network: ZDF
- Release: 9 March – 12 March 2020

Unterleuten: The Torn Village (German: Unterleuten. Das zerrissene Dorf) is a 2020 German television drama serial directed by Matti Geschonneck. It takes place in the fictional village Unterleuten in Brandenburg and follows the intrigues and power struggles when a company wants to install a wind farm in the area. It is based on the novel Unterleuten by Juli Zeh. It premiered in three parts on ZDF.

== Cast ==
- Thomas Thieme as Rudolf Gombrowski
- Hermann Beyer as Kron
- Miriam Stein as Linda Franzen
- Rosalie Thomass as Jule Fließ
- Ulrich Noethen as Dr. Gerhard Fließ
- Charly Hübner as Schaller
- Bettina Lamprecht as Kathrin Kron-Hübschke
- Bjarne Mädel as Wolf Hübschke
- Dagmar Manzel as Hilde Kessler
- Christine Schorn as Elena Gombrowski
- Sarina Radomski as Betty Kessler
- Alexander Held as Meiler
- Mina Tander as Anne Pilz
- Jörg Schüttauf as Arne Seidel
- Waléra Kanischtscheff as Igor
- Jacob Matschenz as Frederick
- Alexander Hörbe as Björn
- Nina Gummich as Miriam Schaller
- Úna Lir as Krönchen
- Hendrik Heutmann as Ingo
- Nikola Kastner as Finkbeiner
- Sven Gerhardt as Dr. Kuhn
- Bärbel Schwarz as Sabine

== Production ==
The programme is based on the novel Unterleuten by Juli Zeh. It was adapted to a screenplay by Magnus Vattrodt and directed by Matti Geschonneck. It had a budget of six million euros. It was filmed over 75 days in 2018, using locations from ten different Brandenburg villages.

== Reception ==
Eva Schnare received the Deutsche Akademie für Fernsehen's award for best editing. Sarina Radomski was nominated for best supporting actress and Anneke Troost for best costume design.
