= Deutscher Bücherpreis =

The Deutscher Bücherpreis (English: German Book Prize) was a non-monetary prize for literature which was awarded at the Leipzig Book Fair by the German Publishers and Booksellers Association from 2002 to 2004.

After September 2004, the Association stopped awarding the prize. Starting from autumn 2005, the Association has instead awarded the similarly named Deutscher Buchpreis at the Frankfurt Book Fair, to a single German-language novel each year. At the Leipzig Book Fair, the Leipzig Book Fair Prize has been awarded since spring 2005, in three categories: fiction, nonfiction and translation.

Listed below are the prizewinners of the award by category. The Deutscher Buchpreis, which replaced the award, is awarded to only one German-language book each year.

== 2002 ==
- German Fiction: Ulla Hahn, Das verborgene Wort
- International Fiction: Per Olov Enquist, Der Desuch des Leibarztes
- Biography/Contemporary History: Günter de Bruyn, Preußens Luise
- Nonfiction: Dietrich Schwanitz, Männer
- Guidebook: Alfred Biolek and Eckart Witzigmann, Unser Kochbuch
- Children's and Young Adult: Mirjam Pressler, Malka Mai
- Debut: Juli Zeh, Eagles and Angels
- Lifetime Achievement: Christa Wolf
- Audience Pick: J. K. Rowling, Harry Potter and the Goblet of Fire

== 2003 ==
- German Fiction: Doris Dörrie, The Blue Dress
- International Fiction: Ian McEwan, Atonement
- Biography/Contemporary History: Peter Merseburger, Willy Brandt 1913-1992
- Nonfiction: Katja Kullmann, Generation Ally
- Guidebook: Vitali and Wladimir Klitschko, Unser Fitnessbuch
- Children's and Young Adult: Paul Maar, Sams in Gefahr
- Debut: Zsuzsa Bánk, Der Schwimmer
- Lifetime Achievement: Peter Härtling
- Audience Pick: Henning Mankell, Die Rückkehr des Tanzlehrers

== 2004 ==
- Fiction: Yann Martel, Life of Pi
- Nonfiction: Michael Moore, Stupid White Men
- Children's and Young Adult: Eoin Colfer, Artemis Fowl: The Eternity Code
- Debut: Yadé Kara, Selam Berlin
- Lifetime Achievement: Mirjam Pressler
- Audience Pick: Éric-Emmanuel Schmitt, M. Ibrahim and the Flowers of the Koran
