= Corpus Delicti =

Corpus delicti can refer to:

- Corpus delicti, a legal term
- Corpus Delicti (band), a gothic rock band
- Corpus Delicti (novel), a 2009 novel by Juli Zeh
- Corpus Delicti (album), an album by Die Form
- "Corpus Delicti," an episode from season 6 of Law & Order
