= Gaming Instinct =

2004 novel by Juli Zeh

- First edition
- Author: Juli Zeh
- Original title: Spieltrieb
- Language: German
- Publisher: Schöffling & Co.
- Publication date: 30 September 2004
- Publication place: Germany
- Pages: 565
- ISBN: 3-89561-056-9

Gaming Instinct (German: Spieltrieb) is a 2004 novel by the German writer Juli Zeh. The story is set in a private high school in Bonn. Intellectually precocious girl Ada and new classmate Alef band together through their mutual interest in Game theory and apply it by blackmailing a teacher into a sexual relationship with her.

== Reception ==
Die Zeit's reviewer placed the novel in a tradition of "German student tragedies" such as Frank Wedekind's Spring Awakening and Hermann Hesse's Beneath the Wheel. The critic compared the language to Robert Musil, and wrote: "It is astonishing, it is admirable, how the only 30-year-old writer, with a well-trained language for all horses and a highly educated ingenuity, races her story through more than 500 pages across the finish line, a story, which couldn't have been more uneasy. Uwe Wittstock of Die Welt found the novel tiresome and unoriginal. He compared its ideas to "commercial reports about the 'youth of today'", and wrote that "at the same time the novel's motif of 'blackmail with compromising photos' strikes me as about as corny as that of the forged letters in novels and plays from the 18th century." The novel received the Per Olov Enquist Award and the Prix Cévennes for Best European Novel.

== Adaptations ==
The book was adapted into a Brazilian miniseries titled A Menina Sem Qualidades, by MTV Brasil. The miniseries premiered on May 27th, 2013.

== See also ==
- 2004 in literature
- German literature
