= Thomas Schreiber (innkeeper) =

German innkeeper

Thomas Schreiber (c. 1598 – 30 May 1629) was a German innkeeper executed for witchcraft. He was the perhaps best known victim of the Mergentheim witch trials, and became known for his opposition to the witch trials. His correspondence is preserved. His case gives an unusually detailed example of the mentality of a city in the midst of a mass witch trial.

== Life ==
Thomas Schreiber was the owner and manager of a popular and successful inn in the city of Mergentheim. He was about 30 years old in 1628, married to Anna Schreiber and with four children. He was a member of a wealthy merchant family with relatives in high offices in several of the neighboring cities.

Beginning in early 1628 and continuing for several years, a series of witch trials, leading to hundreds of executions, was in process in Mergentheim, and Thomas Schreiber became known to be in opposition to it. On the execution of the mayor's wife, Martha Braun, on 1 December 1628, he stated that she had been subjected to a great injustice and compared the execution to the bloodbaths of Nero. Twelve days later, on 12 December 1628, he was pointed out for sorcery in the confession of Martha Dönkherin: he was not arrested nor informed about the accusation, however, as regulations required three independent denunciations before an arrest.

On the execution of Anna Gurren, the wealthy widow of Lorenz Gurren, on 21 January 1629, Schreiber stated he doubted her confession, upon which the official Max Waltzen commented: "Ha, ha, those who know the devil should not be so amazed". After this, Schreiber continued to criticize the witch trials, but also became worried about his safety: "If anything happens to me, let every pious Christian fear for himself. God might preserve everyone from the Neuenhaus [torture chamber] for even the most pious, if put in there, would be found to be a witch". He referred to the witch trials as a bloodbath and stated that he suspected that the city authorities wished to "wash their hands in my blood".

On 29 January, a second woman denounced him under interrogation. Schreiber transferred money from town and left for Ansbach-Hohenlohe on 1 February. He left in such a hurry that he was forced to ask his wife to send him his boots, hat and outer garments to him. When in safety, he wrote to the mayor of Mergentheim, Paul Nachtraben, and justified his flight with a statement that torture resulted in lies; he wrote to his friend and legal adviser Georg Allemahn and tasked him to investigate his case and inform him when it would be safe for him to return; and he wrote to his wife and stated that the judges would go to hell and asked her to join him in Ebersheim in Hohenlohe. His letter to his wife, however, was intercepted by the authorities in Mergentheim, who successfully asked the authorities in Hohenlohe to extradite him to Mergentheim.

=== Trial ===
After his extradition to Mergentheim, Thomas Schreiber was immediately brought before the court on the charges of sorcery. As he had not yet been denounced by three witnesses, only two, he could not be tortured. When asked about his criticism toward witch trials, he replied that he had always said that witch trials were legitimate as long as no one was subjected to injustice. On 13 February, Catharina Reissens denounced him, and the three denunciations necessary for torture was thereby achieved. It is considered likely that all three denunciations against him were performed under pressure from the interrogators.

On 10 April, a joint letter of protest against his arrest signed by friends in Heidenheim, Langenau, Ellwangen, Dinkelsbühl, and Aalen was delivered to Mergentheim, in which they protested against the fact that Schreiber had been arrested without any specific accusations, and that he might have sinned by criticizing the court, but that leniency was warranted because of his youth and minor children. The court asked for legal advice from the court of Würzburg, and was given the advice that torture was fully legitimate given the fact that the accused had been denounced three times, that he had attempted to flee, and that he had criticized the court.

On 19 May, Thomas Schreiber was taken to the torture chamber and shown the instruments of torture, which was the normal procedure to see if the accused would confess without torture would have to be applied. The interrogators stated that the witch trials were the justice of God and encouraged him to confess his guilt, but he called the whole legal process an injustice, called the 34 witchcraft executions that had been conducted since his arrest a bloodbath, and stated to the interrogators: "As truly as Christ died on the cross and God created me, I am innocent. Cannot the learned make mistakes in this matter too?".

During the following torture, he confessed that he committed adultery with Satan in the shape of a woman and that he had become a witch for the sake of sex rather than to perform magic; that he had stolen and desecrated the sacramental bread; that he had attended the witches' Sabbath and that he was since then unable to pronounce the rosary; and finally, he denounced seven accomplices he had purportedly seen attending the Sabbath with him. The court had him confirm his confession four times, on 22, 25, 26 and 28 May, before giving the death sentence. Before his execution, Thomas Schreiber wrote to his wife. He reminded her that she had often said to him that "whoever is chosen for eternal life must undergo thistles, thorns and strife"; that he wished for her to marry again, "on account of the children, for widows and orphans are despised and pushed down in this vile world", and assured her that he was innocent and that they would meet again in heaven. Anna Schreiber wrote back and replied that she asked his forgiveness if she had ever given him the impression that she believed the accusation against him, and that she wished that she was dead herself. Thomas Schreiber was decapitated and burned at the stake on 30 May 1629.
