= Zwischen Welten (novel) =

2023 novel by Juli Zeh and Simon Urban

- Author: Juli Zeh; Simon Urban
- Language: German
- Publisher: Luchterhand Literaturverlag
- Publication date: 25 January 2023
- Publication place: Germany
- Pages: 443
- ISBN: 978-3-630-87741-9

Zwischen Welten (lit. 'Between Worlds') is a 2023 novel by the German writers Juli Zeh and Simon Urban. It is an epistolary novel with the correspondence between two old friends, a man who is an urban journalist and a woman who has become a farmer. It addresses their differing and shared views of the world, society, politics and culture. They are united by a mutual respect for the writer Martin Walser.
