= Gebrauchsanweisung für Pferde =

2019 book by Juli Zeh

- Author: Juli Zeh
- Language: German
- Subject: horses
- Publisher: Piper Verlag
- Publication date: 2019
- Publication place: Germany
- Pages: 221
- ISBN: 978-3-492-27762-4

Gebrauchsanweisung für Pferde (lit. 'User Guide for Horses') is a 2019 book by the German writer Juli Zeh. It is about Zeh's relationship to horses, containing personal anecdotes, history and general reflections. Zeh, a writer and a judge, was asked by a neighbour to help with a horse, ended up taking a two-year course in horse therapy and lives in rural Brandenburg with her family and several horses.
