= Gabriele Wohmann =

German novelist and short story writer of the 20th century

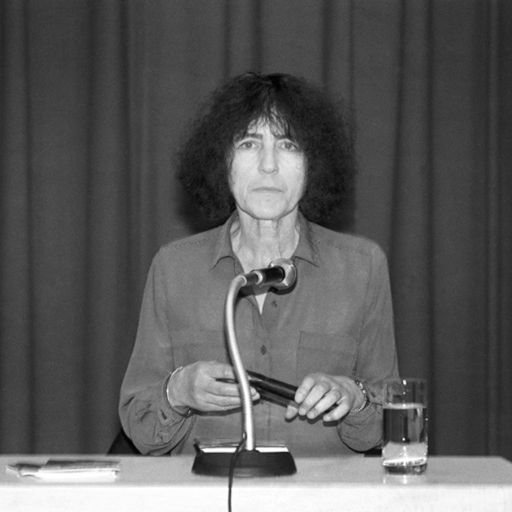
- Gabriele Wohmann in 1992
- Born: 21 May 1932; Darmstadt, Germany
- Died: 22 June 2015 (aged 83); Darmstadt, Germany
- Occupation: Novelist

Gabriele Wohmann (née Guyot; 21 May 1932 – 22 June 2015) was a German novelist, and short story writer.

== Life ==
Wohmann was born in Darmstadt, the daughter of Paul Daniel Guyot, a minister, and Luise Guyot (née Lettermann). She completed her final year of high school (Gymnasium) at the Nordseepädagogium, a boarding school on the island Langeoog. She studied at the university in Frankfurt am Main from 1951 to 1953, leaving without a degree, upon her marriage to Reiner Wohmann, a fellow student. The couple accepted teaching positions on Langeoog for one year, before settling in Darmstadt. She worked as a teacher at her former school on Langeoog, and later at a community college, and a business school.

In 1956, Wohmann's story "Ein unwiderstehlicher Mann" (An Irresistible Man) was accepted for publication by the prestigious Munich-based literary magazine Akzente; it was the first work she had ever submitted anywhere. In 1957 she quit teaching in order to write full time.

Wohmann died on June 23, 2015, after struggling for a long time with serious illness in the place of her birth, Darmstadt.

== Career ==
Wohmann authored short stories, novels, poems, radio plays, television plays, and essays. She attended meetings of the Group 47. She was a member of the Berlin Academy of Arts since 1975, and the German Academy for Language and Literature in Darmstadt since 1980. She was a member of the PEN Centre of the Federal Republic of Germany from 1960 to 1988.

== Works ==
- Jetzt und Nie, Luchterhand, Darmstadt/Neuwied, 1958
- Abschied für länger, Walter, Olten/Freiburg im Breisgau, 1965
- Ernste Absicht, Luchterhand Verlag, Berlin/Neuwied, 1970
- Paulinchen war allein zu Haus, Luchterhand, Darmstadt/Neuwied, 1974
- Schönes Gehege, Luchterhand, Darmstadt/Neuwied, 1975
- Ausflug mit der Mutter, Luchterhand, Darmstadt/Neuwied, 1976
- Frühherbst in Badenweiler, Luchterhand, Darmstadt, 1978
- Ach wie gut daß niemand weiß, Luchterhand, Darmstadt/Neuwied, 1980
- Das Glücksspiel, Luchterhand, Darmstadt/Neuwied, 1981
- Der Flötenton, Luchterhand, Darmstadt/Neuwied, 1987
- Bitte nicht sterben, Piper, München, 1993
- Aber das war noch nicht das Schlimmste, Piper, München, 1995
- Das Handicap, Piper, München, 1996
- Das Hallenbad, Piper, München, 2000
- Abschied von der Schwester, Pendo, Zürich/München, 2001
- Schön und gut, Piper, München, 2002
- Hol mich einfach ab, Piper, München, 2003

=== Works in English ===
- Selected Translations of Gabriele Wohmann, Steven Walter Eau Claire, University of Iowa, 1984
- A Sea Resort, Translator Steven W. Eau Claire, The Journal of Literary Translation, Volume XVI, Spring 1986 ISSN 0093-9307
- The Piano Lesson, Translator Steven W. Eau Claire, The Amherst Review, Volume XIV, 1986
- A Party in the Country, Translator Steve Eau Claire, The Antioch Review, Volume 45, Number 3, Summer 1987 ISSN 0003-5769
- The cherry tree, Translator Jeanne Willson, Dimension, 1994, ISBN 978-0-911173-05-5
- Amos Leslie Willson, ed. (1996). "An Irresistible Man". Contemporary German fiction. Continuum International. ISBN 978-0-8264-0740-5.
