= Thomas Dorn =

Thomas Dorn (born in 1962 in Neuss, Germany) is a photographer and contemporary artist who spends time in Geneva, Cologne and Paris. He has traveled in Africa and some 20 countries. He is known for his album covers for world music, jazz and pop. He collaborated with Ilija Trojanow on a book, Kumbh Mela, released in 2008.

== Books ==
- Le Monde d'Oumou Sy, Association Suisse-Afrique Design, Geneva (2010)
- Kumbh Mela, Frederking & Thaler, Munich (2008)
- Femmes des Antilles, traces et voix, Editions Stock, Paris (1998)
- Houn-Noukoun, Gesichter und Rhythmen Afrikas, Marino Verlag, Munich (1997)
- Houn-Noukoun, Tambours et Visages, Editions Florent-Massot, Paris (1996)

== Exhibitions ==
- Espace Guillaume Expo, Paris (2008)
- Fondation Blachère, Apt (2008)
- Galerie Davel 14, Cully (2007)
- Museum für Kunst und Gewerbe, Hamburg (2006)
- Schloss Wolfsburg, Wolfsburg (2005)
- Maison de la Photographie, Hanover (2004)
