= Yadé Kara =

Turkish-German writer

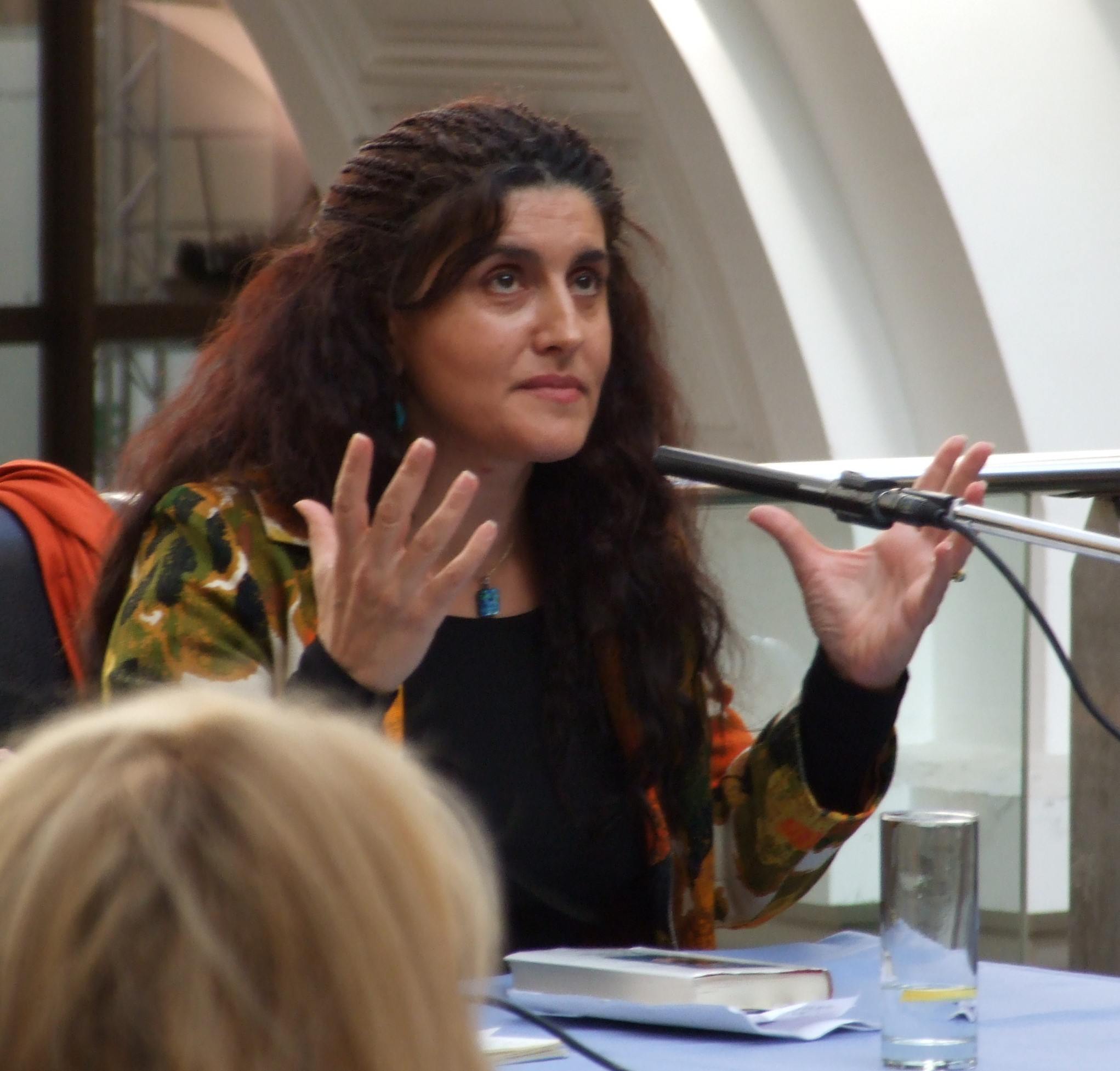
Yadé Kara, 2008, Frankfurt

Yadé Kara (Çayırlı, 1965) is a Turkish-German writer. She has worked as an actress, teacher and journalist. Her first novel, Selam Berlin, published in 2003, won the Deutschen Bücherpreis in 2004 and the Adelbert-von-Chamisso-Förderpreis. Her second novel, Café Cyprus, was published in 2008.

== Life ==
Kara was born in Eastern Anatolia in 1965. Her parents moved to Germany when she was a child, and she grew up in West Berlin. She studied English and German studies and also drama at the Schiller Theater. She has worked as an actress, teacher and journalist in cities like London, Istanbul or Hong Kong and published several articles for radio and television.

Her first novel Selam Berlin (2003) is set in Berlin between the fall of the Berlin Wall and German reunification. It was described by the press as "the Turkish answer to the Wende", by Moray McGowan as "exemplif[ying] Turkish-German writing’s establishment as a marketable commodity’", and by Petra Fachinger as "above all... a self-consciously transnational novel". It won the German Book Prize 2004 and the Adelbert-von-Chamisso-Förderpreis in 2004. The German Book Prize is awarded for the most successful debut novel. The Adelbert-von-Chamisso-Förderpreis is given to a work whose author's mother tongue is not German.

Kara's second book was Café Cyprus, published in 2008, and is set in early 1990s London. Kara describes it as a 'coming-of-age' novel Kara's work has enjoyed popular success, and she has been described as "developing a distinctive style that sets her apart from many of her contemporaries, not least in the work’s narration through a male protagonist".

== Works ==
- Café Cyprus, Roman, Diogenes, Zürich 2008. 375 S. ISBN 978-3-257-06623-4
- Selam Berlin, Roman, Diogenes, Zürich 2003. 381 S. ISBN 3-257-06335-0
