= Unterleuten =

2016 novel by Juli Zeh

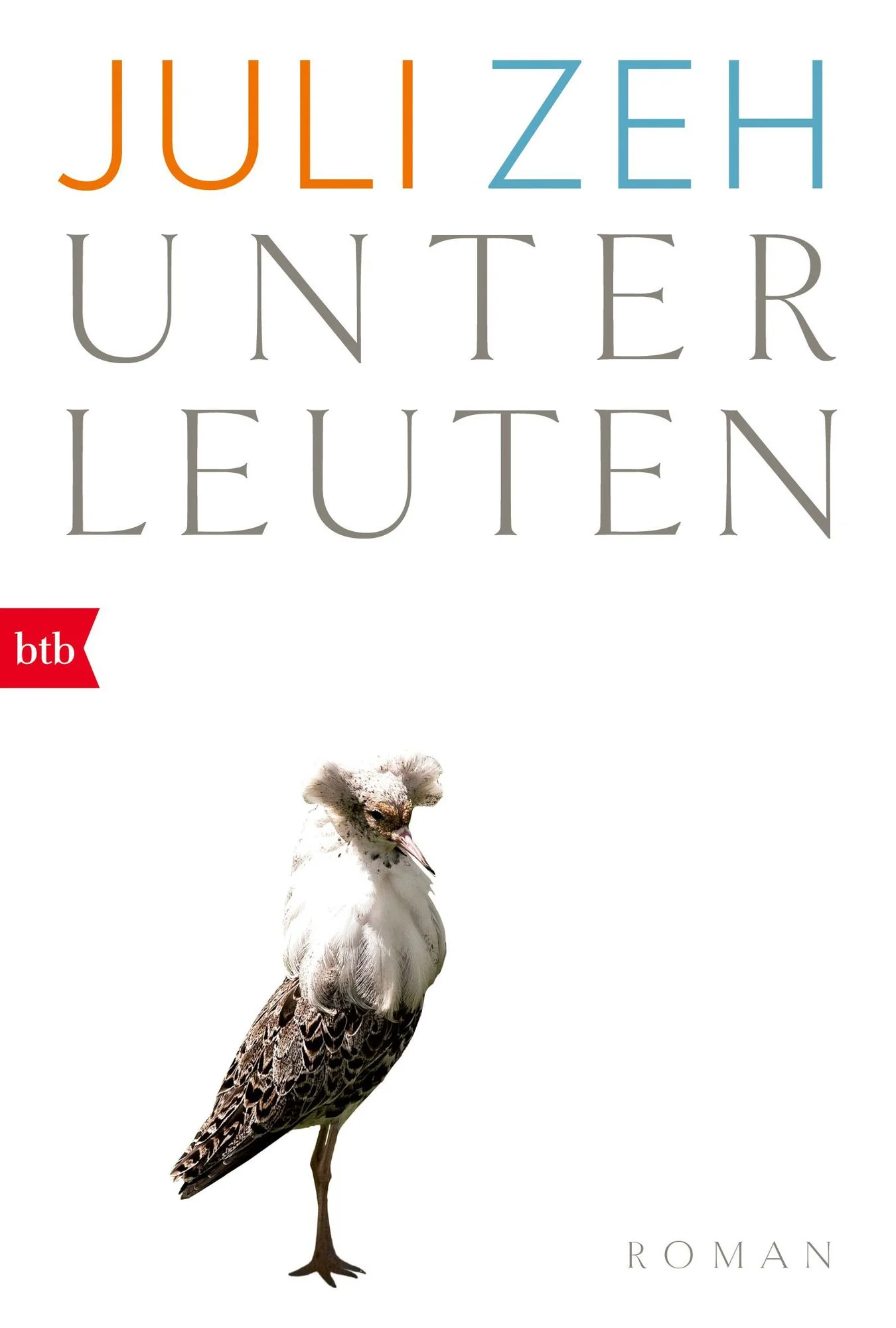
- Author: Juli Zeh
- Language: German
- Publisher: Luchterhand Literaturverlag
- Publication date: 2016
- Publication place: Germany
- Pages: 639
- ISBN: 978-3-630-87487-6

Unterleuten is a 2016 novel by the German writer Juli Zeh. It is set in a village in Brandenburg and follows the locals, among whom conflicts and ambitions emerge when a company wants to create a wind farm in the area.

== Reception ==
Unterleuten was a bestseller in Germany. By July 2016, it had sold more than 110,000 copies.

== Translations ==
It has been translated into Italian with the title "Turbine" (Turbines)

== Adaptation ==
The novel was the basis for Unterleuten: The Torn Village, a television serial that premiered on ZDF in 2020.
