= Catelijne Verbauwen =

Flemish witch trials victim

- Born: 16th century Loppem, Brugse Vrije
- Died: 2 December 1611; Brugse Vrije, County of Flanders, Spanish Netherlands
- Cause of death: Execution by strangulation & burning
- Known for: Victim of the witch hunts in Europe
- Criminal charges: Witchcraft, dealings with the Devil

Catelijne Verbauwen (born 16th century in Loppem – died Brugse Vrije, 2 December 1611) was a victim of the witch trials in the early modern period.

Verbauwen was born in Loppem where she also lived. She was the daughter of Joos Verbauwen. She together with Pauwel Van Hove leased a farm in Loppem. She was accused and sentenced to death for being a witch.

On the rack, she confessed that she had dealings with the Devil, including while imprisoned. As the executioner increased the torture, her stories became more numerous and elaborate. The Devil appeared to her in the form of a young man, dressed entirely in black with a rooster feather on his hat. He had sexual relations with her and paid her for them. When the judges wanted more details, Catelijne explained that his penis and body were cold, and his member was not as large as her husband’s. 'She didn’t have much pleasure from it.'

Catelijne Verbauwen was granted the mercy of strangulation before being burned alive. On 2 December 1611, the sentence of the magistrates of Brugse Vrije was as follows: 'To be tied to a stake so that death follows, first strangled and then the body burned at the stake.'

== See also ==
- Fulda witch trials
- Martha Corey
- Maria Holl
