= Mergentheim witch trials =

1628–1631 German trials

The Mergentheim witch trials took place in Mergentheim in Germany between 1628 and 1631. These witch trials resulted in the deaths of 126 people; there were 122 executions, and four died during torture. The trials belonged to the great wave of witch-hunting that took place in southwestern Germany during the Thirty Years' War. It is one of the best documented of the mass witch trials of southwestern Germany. Perhaps the best known victim of the Mergentheim witch trials was the innkeeper Thomas Schreiber, who had been vocal in opposition to the trials before his own arrest.

In the 1620s, Mergentheim was ruled by the Catholic Teutonic Order. In 1627, a group of women were arrested and interrogated, but they were released, because there were no knowledge on how to conduct a witch trials in Mergentheim. In parallel, the gigantic Würzburg witch trials were taking place. Due to the witch trials in Würzberg, the Mergentheim official Bernhard Reichardt removed his son Johan Bernhard from the school in Würzburg, but in March 1628, the authorities of Würzburg demanded Johan Bernhard be returned because he had been charged with witchcraft in Würzburg. He was indeed returned to Würzburg and executed. The execution was approved by the Grand Master Johann Caspar in Mergentheim, which caused a witch panic to occur in Mergentheim. In July 1628, the tailor Velltin Beckh complained that his sons (age 12, 14 and 15) had been expelled without stated reason. When this was investigated, it was revealed that the boys had claimed they were witches. The boys were interrogated and made to point out other witches, who in turn were arrested and interrogated, which caused the Mergentheim witch trials.

The Teutonic Order conducted the Mergentheim witch trials under consultation of the authorities from Würzburg and Bamberg, who at that point conducted the gigantic Würzburg witch trials and Bamberg witch trials. Bamberg sent Dr. Ernst Vasoldt, an experienced witch hunter, to act as adviser in Mergentheim in September-December 1628; he helped the authorities to make lists of suspects from the city and villages of the surrounding territory and to organize the witch trials in the same pattern as the Bamberg witch trials had been conducted.

The arrested were interrogated by torture to confess to intercourse with Satan or his demons; making a pact with him; having attended a witches' sabbath and to have performed evil magic; and to point out other witches. This method, was the case in Bamberg after which it was made, allowed the witch trial to expand rapidly. 301 people were accused of witchcraft, 136 were charged and 122 were executed; 17 executions took place during the visit of Vasoldt; 91 executions and four deaths by torture occurred in 1629, fourteen executions in 1630, and the last execution took place in February 1631. While the Mergentheim witch trials were not the biggest of the numerous mass witch trials of the 1620s, they were likely the best-documented.

== Source ==
- Midelfort, H. C. Erik, Witch hunting in southwestern Germany 1562-1684: the social and intellectual foundations, U.P, Stanford, Calif, 1972
