= Die Stille ist ein Geräusch =

2002 book by Juli Zeh

- Author: Juli Zeh
- Language: German
- Publisher: btb Verlag
- Publication date: 2002
- Publication place: Germany
- Pages: 263
- ISBN: 9783442731046

Die Stille ist ein Geräusch. Eine Fahrt durch Bosnien (lit. 'The Silence Is a Sound: A Journey through Bosnia') is a 2002 travel book by the German writer Juli Zeh. It is about Bosnia in the aftermath of the Yugoslav Wars.
