= Simon Urban =

German novelist

Simon Urban (born in 1975) is a German novelist.

Simon Urban was born in Hagen in 1975. He studied at the Leipzig University's German Institute for Literature, worked in advertising and published short stories before he debuted as a novelist. His first novel was Plan D (2011), a political and ironic thriller set in an alternative present where East Germany never fell. His second novel Gondwana (2014) is a satirical murder mystery set on a Pacific island where people from different religions try to co-exist in an experiment where they adopt every prohibition from each other's religions. Wie alles begann und wer dabei umkam (2021) is a picaresque novel about death penalty and legal paradoxes. In 2023 he published the social novel Zwischen Welten which he co-wrote with Juli Zeh. It consists of e-mails and phone messages between a woman who runs a farm and a man who works at a newspaper; they disagree about many matters but both adore the writer Martin Walser.

== Publications ==
- 2011: Plan D
- 2014: Gondwana
- 2021: Wie alles begann und wer dabei umkam
- 2023: Zwischen Welten
