= Dark Matter (Zeh novel) =

2007 novel by Juli Zeh

- First edition
- Author: Juli Zeh
- Original title: Schilf
- Translator: Christine Lo
- Language: German
- Publisher: Schöffling & Co.
- Publication date: 1 December 2007
- Publication place: Germany
- English publication date: 2010
- Pages: 384
- ISBN: 3-89561-431-9

Dark Matter (German: Schilf) is a 2007 novel by the German writer Juli Zeh. It was published as In Free Fall in the United States. It tells the story of a physics professor who is told he has to kill a man in order to get his kidnapped son back, and a detective, Schilf, who steps in to solve the case.

== Writing process ==
Juli Zeh worked on the novel for three years. She researched physics by reading books on the subject and consulted a physics professor, to "make sure that the mistakes I was bound to make were not too obvious." She described the character Schilf as "sort of my brother-in-mind", and identified strongly with him while writing. A reference for the character Oskar was Oscar Wilde.

== Reception ==
Brigitte Helbling of Welt am Sonntag compared the novel's use of scientific concepts to Michel Houellebecq's Atomised and the works of Thomas Pynchon, and reflected that "theoretical physics as an aid to explaining the world" has become "the new religion, the new philosophy in the modern novel". Helbling wrote that with so much plotting and stylistic content as there is in Dark Matter, one would wonder how it would be possible to piece the book together: "Other authors would go belly-up with such a cargo. Juli Zeh steers it confidently and gently, even with wit to the port. Dark Matter is a virtuoso presentation of astonishing storytelling.

The book was longlisted for the Independent Foreign Fiction Prize in 2011.

== Adaptation ==
The film adaptation Schilf directed by Claudia Lehmann premiered in 2011.

== See also ==
- 2007 in literature
- German literature
