= Eagles and Angels =

2001 novel by Juli Zeh

- First edition
- Author: Juli Zeh
- Original title: Adler und Engel
- Translator: Christine Slenczka
- Language: German
- Publisher: Schöffling & Co.
- Publication date: 2001
- Publication place: Germany
- English publication date: 2003
- Pages: 444
- ISBN: 3-89561-054-2

Eagles and Angels (German: Adler und Engel) is a 2001 novel by the German writer Juli Zeh.

== Reception ==
Josh Lacey wrote in The Guardian: "Zeh's style is always enjoyable. She writes brittle little sentences, trying to shock and often succeeding. Her characters are vivacious and thrilling; she tussles with big themes, and is fuelled by an admirable fury. But the novel doesn't quite work - the plot has many inconsistencies, the characters aren't entirely credible, the narrative voice strives too hard for effect."

== See also ==
- 2001 in literature
- German literature
