= Schöffling & Co. =

German publishing house

Schöffling & Co. is a publishing house based in Frankfurt, Germany.

== History ==
The company was founded in Frankfurt in 1994 by Klaus Schöffling and his wife Ida Schöffling after a financier forced them out of their previous publishing house, Frankfurter Verlagsanstalt, which they founded in 1987. Several of their published authors urged them to start a new company.

Among the authors published by Schöffling & Co. are Eva Demski, Mirko Bonné, Franziska Gerstenberg, Silke Scheuermann, Burkhard Spinnen, Klaus Modick, Jochen Schimmang, Juli Zeh, Markus Orths, Guntram Vesper and Ror Wolf.

The Swiss publishing house Kampa Verlag acquired Schöffling & Co. in 2021.
