= E.T.A.-Hoffmann-Theater =

Coordinates: 49°53′26″N 10°53′29″E

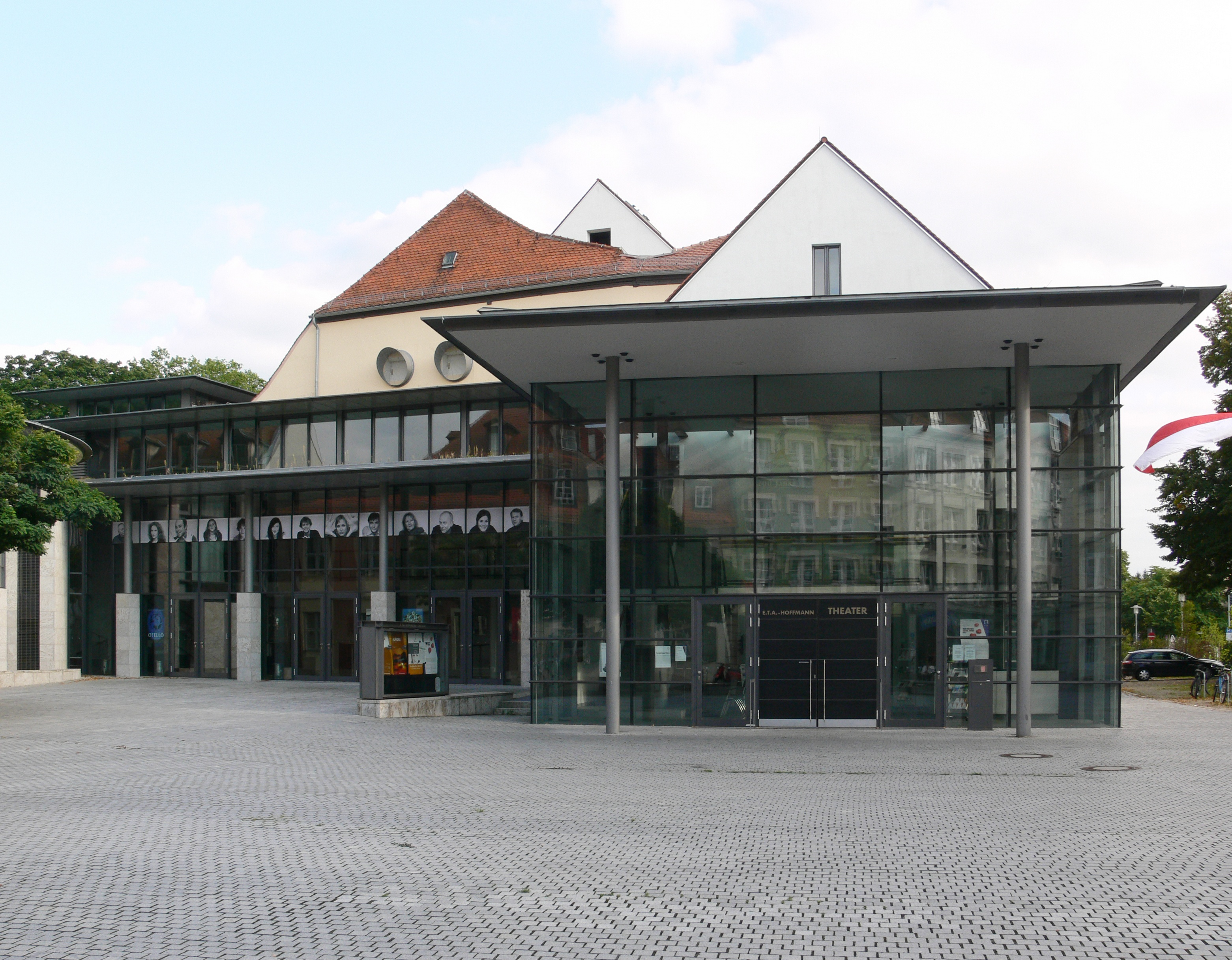
The E.T.A.-Hoffmann-Theater

The E.T.A.-Hoffmann-Theater is a theatre in Bamberg, Bavaria, Germany, named after the writer E. T. A. Hoffmann.
