= Elke Schmitter =

German journalist, novelist and poet

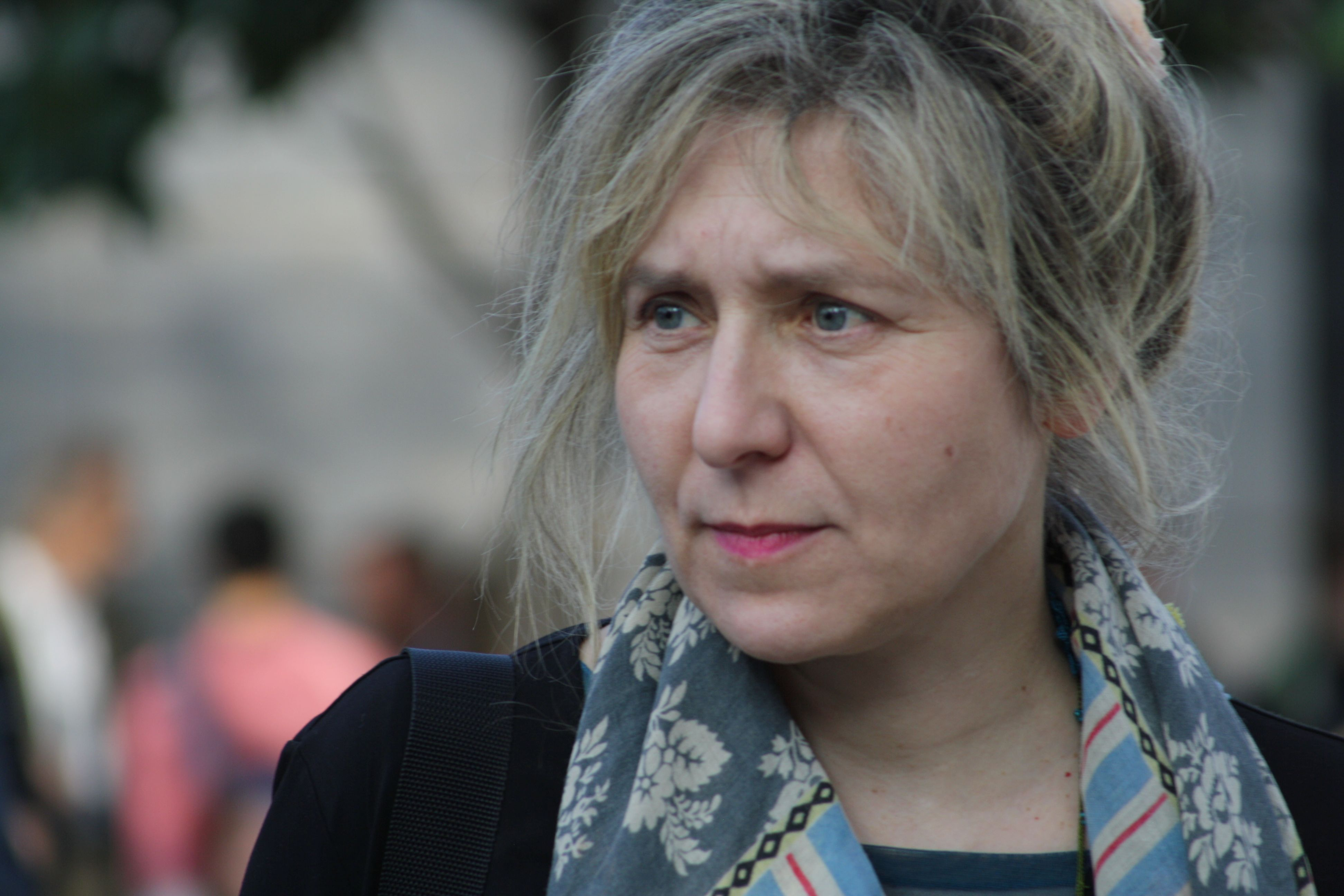
Elke Schmitter at Leipzig Book Fair 2012

Elke Schmitter (born 25 January 1961, Krefeld, West Germany) is a German journalist, novelist and poet.

After studying philosophy in Munich, Schmitter worked as a journalist until 1994, when she became a full-time writer.

Her first novel to be translated into English was Mrs. Sartoris, published in German in 2000 and English in 2003, ISBN 978-0-375-72614-9.

== Memberships ==
- 2026 Member of the Academy of Arts, Berlin

== Bibliography ==
- Schmitter, Elke (2007). Mrs. Sartoris. Westminster: Knopf Doubleday Publishing Group. ISBN 978-0-375-72614-9.
- Schmitter, Elke (2024). Alles, was ich über Liebe weiss, steht in diesem Buch: ein Bildungsroman (in German). München: C.H. Beck. ISBN 978-3-406-82228-5.
