= Würzburg witch trials =

Holy Roman Empire witch trials (1625–1631)

- Court: Witch Commission of the Prince-Bishopric of Würzburg
- Decided: 1625–1631

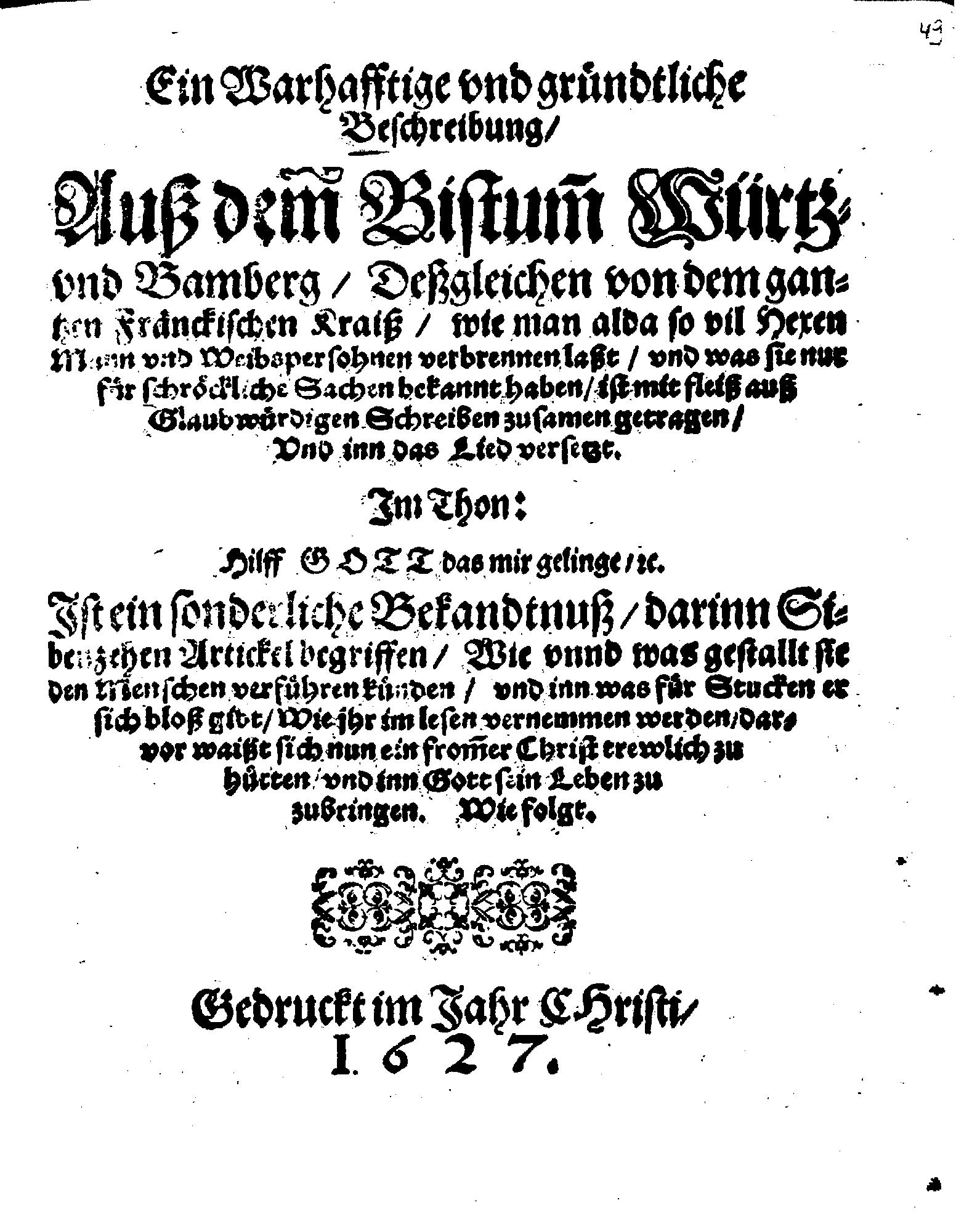
Contemporary pamphlet about the Würzburg witch trials

The Würzburg witch trials of 1625–1631, which took place in the self-governing Catholic Prince-Bishopric of Würzburg in the Holy Roman Empire in present-day Germany, formed one of the biggest mass trials and mass executions ever seen in Europe, and one of the largest witch trials in history.

The trials resulted in the execution of hundreds of people of all ages, sexes and classes, all of whom were burned at the stake, sometimes after having been beheaded or strangled but other times alive. One hundred and fifty-seven women, children and men in the city of Würzburg are confirmed to have been executed; 219 are estimated to have been executed in the city proper, and an estimated 900 were executed or died in custody in the Prince-Bishopric. The witch trials took place during the ongoing religious Thirty Years War between Protestants and Catholics, in an area on the religious border between Catholic and Protestant territories and were all conducted by Catholic Prince-Bishops intent on introducing the Counter-Reformation and extirpating Protestantism in their territories.

The Würzburg witch trials were among the largest Witch trials in the Early Modern period: the series was one of the four largest in Germany along with the Trier witch trials, the Fulda witch trials, and the Bamberg witch trials.

== History ==
=== Context ===
The Protestant Reformation, which Martin Luther (Not to be confused with Martin Luther King Jr) started in 1517 with his Ninety-Five Theses put on the door of the All-Saints' Church in Wittenberg. They challenged the Catholic Church's authority and it started a great religious divide. This split Christianity in Germany into opposing Catholic and Protestant factions, which led to conflicts like the Schmalkaldic War. (1546-1547) In 1555, the Peace of Augsburg, a treaty between Holy Roman Emperor Charles V and the Schmalkaldic League granted local rulers the authority to choose either Catholicism or Lutheranism as the official religion of their territories. It brought peace, but it didn't resolve other religious tensions. This led to the Thirty Years War. Continuous warfare caused social and economic instability. This made citizens fearful and superstitious, and led to accusations of witchcraft. Wurzburg, a Catholic stronghold under the Prince-Bishopric, became a center of witch trials during the Thirty Years War. Prince-Bishops such as Philipp Adolf von Ehrenberg, were determined to eliminate heresy and consolidate their power. They used witch hunts to enforce religious conformity and maintain social balance.

During the 1620s, with the destruction of Protestantism in Bohemia and the Electorate of the Palatinate, the Catholic reconquest of Germany was resumed. In 1629, with the Edict of Restitution, its basis seemed complete. Those same years saw the worst of all witch persecutions, at least in central Europe. It was the climax of the European craze. Many of the witch-trials of the 1620s multiplied with Catholic reconquest. In some areas the lord or bishop was the instigator, in others the Jesuits. Sometimes local witch-committees were set up to further the work. Among prince-bishops, Philipp Adolf von Ehrenberg of Würzburg was particularly active. During his reign (1623–31), he executed around 900 persons, including his own nephew, between 19-43 Catholic priests, and children as young as seven who were said to have had intercourse with demons. From 1627–29, in Baden, recently reconquered for Catholicism by Tilly, there were 70 victims in Ortenau and 79 in Offenburg. In Eichstätt, a Bavarian prince-bishopric, 274 were put to death in 1629. At Reichertshofen, in the district of Neuburg an der Donau, 50 were executed between November 1628 and August 1630. In the three prince-archbishoprics of the Rhineland the fires were also relit. At Coblenz, the seat of the Prince-Archbishop of Trier, 24 witches were burnt in 1629; at Sélestat at least 30 — the beginning of a five-year persecution.

=== Local background and outbreak ===
The witchcraft persecutions in Würzburg was initiated by the Reform Catholic and Counter-Reformation Catholic Prince Bishop Julius Echter von Mespelbrunn, Prince Bishop of Würzburg (1609–22). In 1612, he incorporated the Protestant city of Freudenburg in the Catholic Bishopric, which resulted in a witch trial with fifty executions. This was followed by a witch trial in Würzburg itself, where some 300 people were executed between July 1616 and July 1617, before the persecutions suddenly stopped at the outbreak of the Thirty Years War in 1618.

The exact cause of the witch trials of 1625-1631 is not entirely clear due to the incomplete documentation. A first witch trial took place in 1625, though it was an isolated case. In 1626, the vine grape harvest was destroyed by frost. Upon rumours that the frost had been caused by sorcery, some suspects were arrested and confessed under torture that they had caused the frost by use of magic.

=== Legal process ===
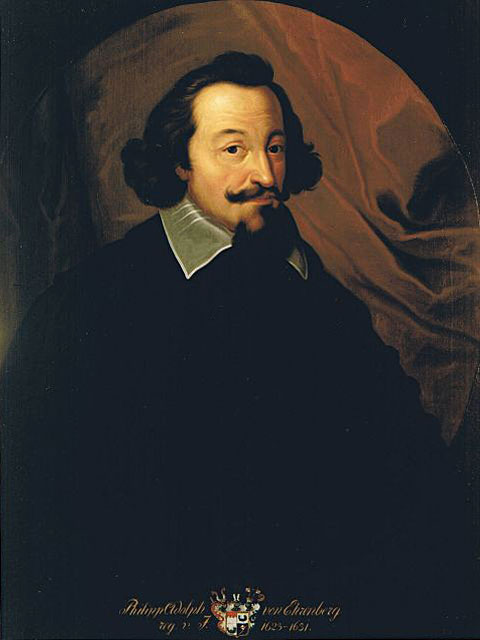
Philipp Adolf von Ehrenberg, the Prince-Bishop of Würzburg from 1622 to 1631, on whose order the witch trials took place

The Würzburg witch trials of 1625–1631 was initiated by the Reform Catholic and Counter-Reformation Catholic Prince Bishop Philipp Adolf von Ehrenberg, Prince Bishop of Würzburg in 1623–1631, who was the nephew and successor of Julius Echter von Mespelbrunn. The territory was close to the Catholic-Protestant religious border, and the goal of the new Prince Bishop was to create a "godly state" in accordance with the ideals of the Counter-Reformation, and to make the population obedient, devout and conformally Catholic, and when witchcraft was rumoured to exist in the city, he ordered an investigation.

A special commission was organized with the task to handle all cases of witchcraft. The Witch Commission used torture without any of the restrictions regulated by the Constitutio Criminalis Carolina, in order to force the accused to first confess to their own guilt and then to name accomplices and other they had seen performing magic or attending the Witches' Sabbath. Those who had been named as accomplices were arrested in turn and tortured to name new accomplices, which caused the witch trial to expand rapidly in number of arrests and executions, especially since the Witch Commission did not discriminate in which names to accept but arrested men and women of all ages and classes indiscriminately.

=== Cases and accused ===
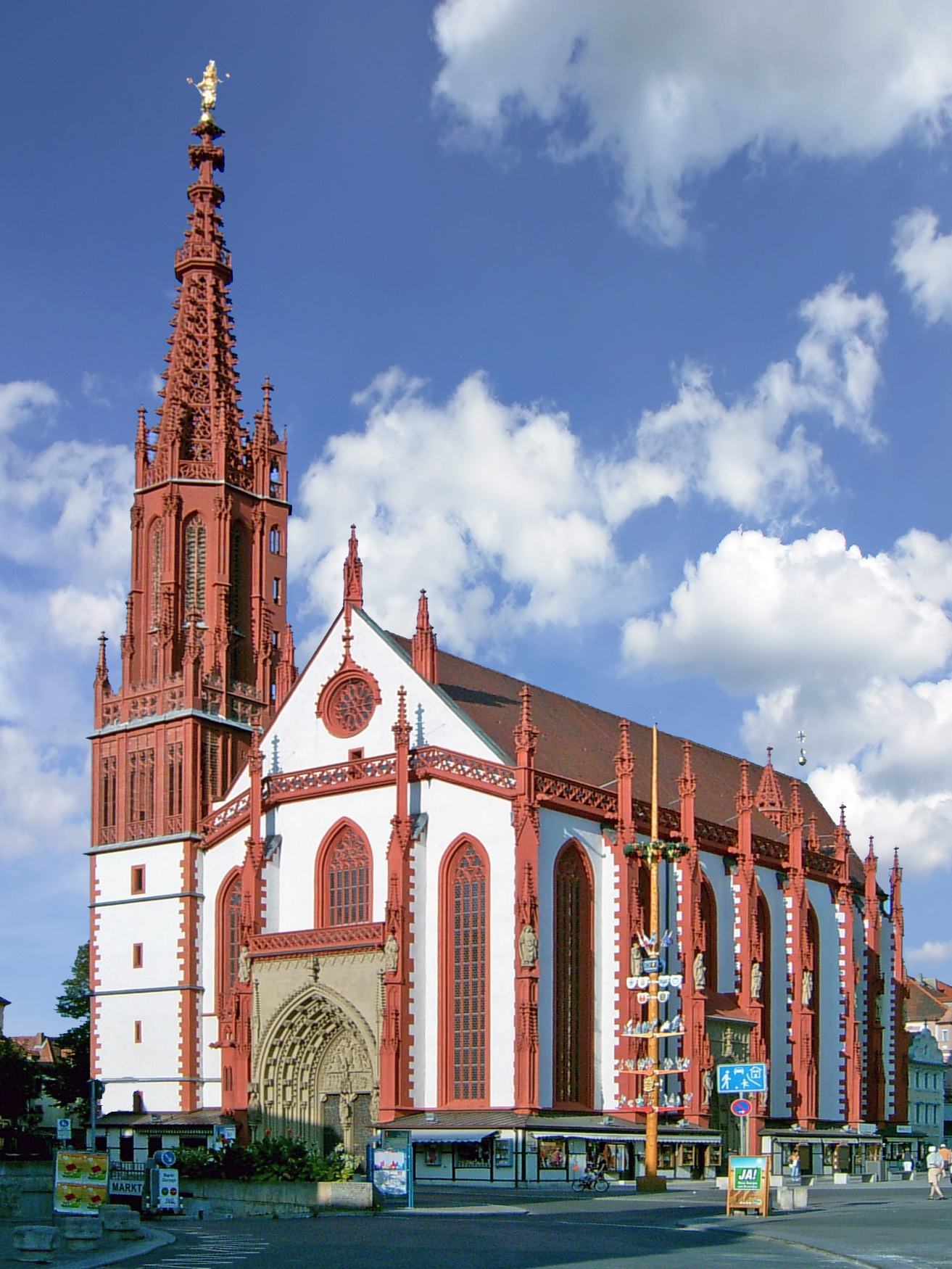
The Marienkapelle, outside of which the burnings are believed to have taken place

Typical for both the Würzburg witch trial as well as the parallel witch trial in Bamberg, members of the elite were arrested after having been named by working-class people under torture, which was a phenomenon which would normally not have happened in contemporary society, if the process had been about a different crime. Würzburg and Bamberg, however, differed somewhat in that in Würzburg, many members of the clerical elite were arrested, and many children were among the accused.

The first arrests in the city were of the traditional suspects: poor working-class women. But as the trials expanded in size, more and more men and children from all classes were among the accused, and in the later years of the trials, men were sometimes in the majority of the executed. Between 19 and 43 priests were executed, as well as Ernst von Ehrenberg, a nephew of the Prince Bishop himself. Ernst was beheaded and his body burnt posthumously. At least 49 children under the age of twelve are confirmed to have been executed, many of them from the orphanage and school Julius-Spital.

A contemporary letter from 1629 describes how people of all ages and classes were arrested every day. A third of the population was suspected of having attended the Witches' Sabbath and being noted in the black book of Satan that the authorities were searching for. People from all walks of life were arrested and charged, regardless of age, profession, or sex, for reasons ranging from murder and satanism to humming a song including the name of the Devil, or simply for being vagrants and unable to give a satisfactory explanation of why they were passing through town: 32 appear to have been vagrants.

The exact number of executions is not known, since documentation is only partially preserved. A list describes 157 executions from 1627 until February 1629 in the city itself, but Hauber who preserved the list in Acta et Scripta Magica, noted that the list was far from complete and that there were a great many other burnings, too many to specify. February 1629 was furthermore in the middle of the witch trials, which continued for two more years until 1631. The executions within the city itself have been estimated at 219, with another 900 in the areas under the authority of the Prince Bishop outside the city.

=== The end ===
The ongoing mass process in Würzburg attracted considerable attention. That the Witch Commission accepted the names of supposed accomplices given by people undergoing torture indiscriminately, regardless of societal standing, had the result that many of those arrested had influential relatives and connections among the upper class. These people had the resources to escape the territory and issue complaints against the Prince-Bishop and his witch trials to his superiors, all the way to the Pope and the Holy Roman Emperor. In 1630, after just such a complaint to the Imperial Chamber Court in Speyer, a public condemnation against the persecutions was issued by the Emperor. On 16 July 1631, the Prince Bishop Philipp Adolf von Ehrenberg died. That same year, the city was occupied by the Swedish Army under King Gustavus Adolphus, and the witch trials were finally brought to an end.

== Legacy and aftermath ==
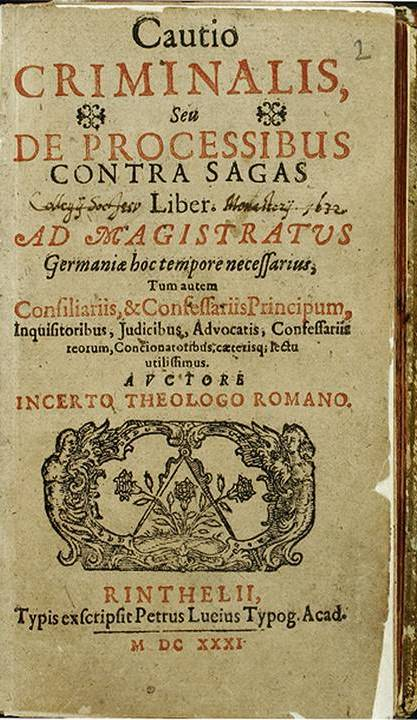
Spee's Cautio Criminalis, attributed to "unknown Roman theologian"

In contemporary Germany, the gigantic, parallel mass witch trials of Würzburg and Bamberg were seen as role models by other states and cities interested in investigating witchcraft, notably Wertheim and Mergentheim. The Würzburg witch trials influenced the start of the Mergentheim witch trials in 1628, and unrestricted witchcraft persecutions came to be known as "Würzburgisch work".

=== Accounts ===
While the parallel Bamberg witch trials are famous for the contemporary letter of the prisoner Johannes Junius to his daughter, the Würzburg witch trials are famous for the contemporary letter written by a councillor of the Prince Bishop to a friend, describing the ongoing witch hunt.

In August, 1629, the Chancellor of the Prince-Bishop of Würzburg thus wrote (in German) to a friend:

As to the affair of the witches, which Your Grace thinks brought to an end before this, it has started up afresh, and no words can do justice to it. Ah, the woe and the misery of it--there are still four hundred in the city, high and low, of every rank and sex, nay, even clerics, so strongly accused that they may be arrested at any hour. It is true that, of the people of my Gracious Prince here, some out of all offices and faculties must be executed: clerics, electoral councilors and doctors, city officials, court assessors, several of whom Your Grace knows. There are law students to be arrested. The Prince-Bishop has over forty students who are soon to be pastors; among them thirteen or fourteen are said to be witches. A few days ago a Dean was arrested; two others who were summoned have fled. The notary of our Church consistory, a very learned man, was yesterday arrested and put to the torture. In a word, a third part of the city is surely involved. The richest, most attractive, most prominent, of the clergy are already executed. A week ago a maiden of nineteen was executed, of whom it is everywhere said that she was the fairest in the whole city, and was held by everybody a girl of singular modesty and purity. She will be followed by seven or eight others of the best and most attractive persons ... And thus many are put to death for renouncing God and being at the witch-dances, against whom nobody has ever else spoken a word.

To conclude this wretched matter, there are children of three and four years, to the number of three hundred, who are said to have had intercourse with the Devil. I have seen put to death children of seven, promising students of ten, twelve, fourteen, and fifteen. Of the nobles--but I cannot and must not write more of this misery. There are persons of yet higher rank, whom you know, and would marvel to hear of, nay, would scarcely believe it; let justice be done . . .

P. S. -- Though there are many wonderful and terrible things happening, it is beyond doubt that, at a place called the Fraw-Rengberg, the Devil in person, with eight thousand of his followers, held an assembly and celebrated mass before them all, administering to his audience (that is, the witches) turnip-rinds and parings in place of the Holy Eucharist. There took place not only foul but most horrible and hideous blasphemies, whereof I shudder to write. It is also true that they all vowed not to be enrolled in the Book of Life, but all agreed to be inscribed by a notary who is well known to me and my colleagues. We hope, too, that the book in which they are enrolled will yet be found, and there is no little search being made for it.

Historian Robert Meier argues that the unnamed nineteen-year-old maiden described in this account likely refers to Barbara Göbel, who appears in the execution list as "Das Göbel Babelin", "the most beautiful maiden in Würzburg".

=== Friedrich Spee ===
A Jesuit, Friedrich Spee, was more radically converted by his experience as a confessor of witches in the great persecution at Würzburg. That experience, which turned his hair prematurely white, convinced him that all confessions were worthless, being based solely on torture, and that not a single person whom he had led to the stake had been guilty. He wrote a book which he intended to circulate in manuscript, anonymously. However, a friend secretly conveyed it to the Protestant city of Hameln, where it was printed in 1631 under the title Cautio Criminalis.

=== Fiction ===
A German novel, Der Aufruhr um den Junker Ernst (The uproar over the junker Ernst), by Jakob Wassermann (1873–1934), published in 1926 by S. Fischer Verlag in Berlin, took place during the trials with the main character being one of the most known victims; Ernst von Ehrenberg, nephew of the Prince Bishop.

== The list of executions ==
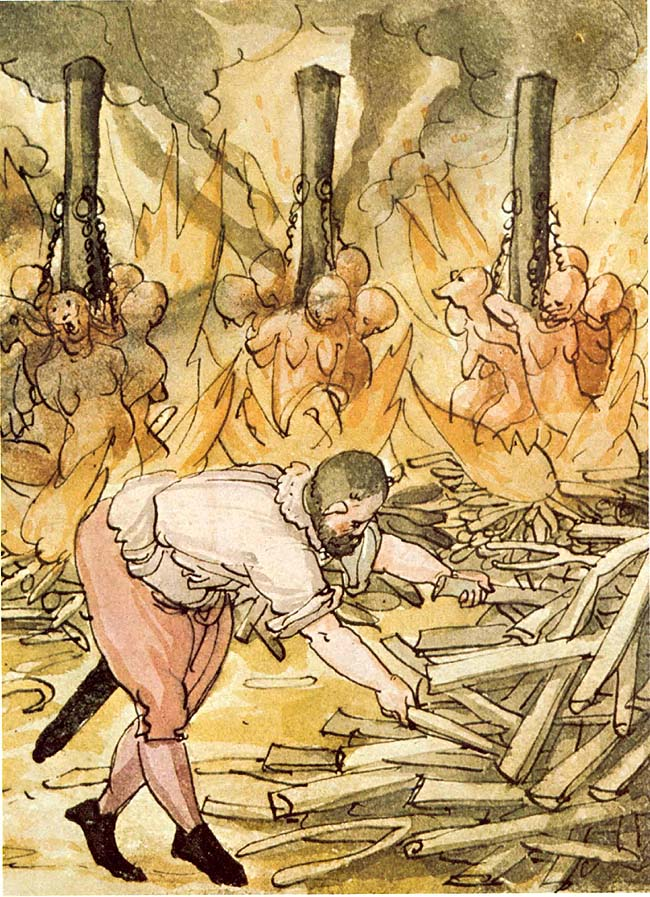
Execution of witchcraft by burning

There is a famous list of the executions in the Würzburg witch trials, published in 1745 in the Eberhard David Hauber: Bibliotheca sive acta et scripta magica. Gründliche Nachrichten und Urtheile von solchen Büchern und Handlungen, welche die Macht des Teufels in leiblichen Dingen betreffen, 36 Stücke in 3 Bänden. Lemgo 1738-1745, Bibl. mag. 36. Stück, 1745, S. 807. The list is, however, incomplete, being based on a document which explicitly states that it has cited only a selection of the executions, and that there were numerous other burnings beside those enumerated. Furthermore, the list includes only executions carried out before the date 16 February 1629, at which time the trials were still ongoing, continuing for more than another two years. Most of those listed as executed are not identified by name, but instead in terms such as Gobel's child, aged nineteen, "The prettiest girl in town", "A wandering boy, twelve years of age" or "Four strange men and women, found sleeping in the market-place". The accusation of "strange" often simply meant that they were not residents of Würzburg or were believed to be Protestants. The list gives the following cases:

In the First Burning, Four people.

- The wife of Liebler.
- Old Ancker's widow.
- The wife of Gutbrodt.
- The wife of Hooker.

In the Second Burning, Four people.

- The old wife of Beutler.
- Two strange women.
- The old woman who kept the pot-house.

In the Third Burning, Five people.

- Tungersleber, a minstrel.
- The wife of Kuler.
- The wife of Stier, a proctor.
- The brushmaker's wife.
- The goldsmith's wife.

In the Fourth Burning, Five people.

- The wife of Siegmund the glazier, a burgomaster.
- Brickmann's wife.
- The midwife. N.B. She was the origin of all the mischief.
- Old Rume's wife.
- A strange man.

In the Fifth Burning, Eight people.

- Lütz, an eminent shopkeeper.
- Rutscher, a shopkeeper.
- The housekeeper of the dean of the cathedral.
- The old wife of the court ropemaker.
- Jo. Stembach's housekeeper.
- The wife of Baunach, a senator.
- A woman named Znickel Babel.
- An old woman.

In the Sixth Burning, Six people

- The steward of the senate, named Gering.
- Old Mrs. Canzler.
- The fat tailor's wife.
- The woman cook of Mr. Mengerdorf.
- A strange man.
- A strange woman.

In the Seventh Burning, Seven people.

- A strange girl of twelve years old.
- A strange man.
- A strange woman.*
- A strange bailiff (schultheiss).
- Three strange women.

In the Eighth Burning, Seven people.

- Baunach, a senator, the fattest citizen in Wurzburg.
- The steward of the dean of the cathedral.
- A strange man.
- The knife-grinder.
- The ganger's wife.
- Two strange women.

In the Ninth Burning, Five people.

- Wunth, the wheelwright.
- A strange man.
- Bentze's daughter.
- Bentze's wife herself.
- The wife of Eyering.

In the Tenth Burning, Three people.

- Steinacher, a very rich man.
- A strange woman.
- A strange man.

In the Eleventh Burning, Four people.

- Schwerdt, a vicar-choral in the cathedral.
- Rensackei's housekeeper.
- The wife of Stiecher.
- Silberhans, a minstrel.

In the Twelfth Burning, Two people.

- Two strange women.

In the Thirteenth Burning, Four people.

- The old smith of the court.
- An old woman,
- A little girl nine or ten years old.
- A younger girl, her little sister.

In the Fourteenth Burning, Two people.

- The mother of the two little girls before mentioned.
- Liebler's daughter, aged twenty-four years.

In the Fifteenth Burning, Two people.

- A boy of twelve years of age, in the first school.
- A butcher's wife.

In the Sixteenth Burning, Six people. A noble page of Ratzenstein, was executed in the chancellor's yard at six o'clock in the morning, and left upon his bier all day, and then next day burnt with the following:

- A boy of ten years of age.
- The two daughters of the steward of the senate, and his maid.
- The fat ropemaker's wife.

In the Seventeenth Burning, Four people.

- The innkeeper of the Baumgarten.
- A boy eleven years old.
- The wife of the apothecary at the Hirsch (the Stag), and her daughter.
- N.B. [Not Burnt] — A woman who played the harp had hanged herself.

In the Eighteenth Burning, Six people.

- Batsch, a tanner.
- Two boys of twelve years old.
- The daughter of Dr Junge.
- A girl of fifteen years of age.
- A strange woman.

In the Nineteenth Burning, Six people.

- A noble page of Rotenham was beheaded at six o'clock in the chancellor's yard, and burnt the following day
- The wife of the secretary Schellhar.
- A woman.
- A boy of ten years of age.
- Another boy twelve years old.
- Brugler's wife, a cymbal-player, was burnt alive.

In the Twentieth Burning Six people.

- Barbara Göbel, recorded in the German execution list as "Das Göbel Babelin", "the most beautiful maiden in Würzburg".
- A student on the fifth form, who knew many languages, and was an excellent musician.
- Two boys from the new minister, each twelve years old.
- Stepper's little daughter.
- The woman who kept the bridge-gate.

In the Twenty-first Burning, Six people.

- The master of the Dietricher hospital, a very learned man.
- Stoffel Holtzmann.
- A boy, fourteen years old.
- The little son of Senator Stolzenberger.
- Two alumni.

In the Twenty- second Burning, Six people.

- Stürman, a rich cooper.
- A strange boy.
- The grown-up daughter of Senator Stolzenberger.
- The wife of Senator Stolzenberger.
- The washerwoman in the new building.
- A strange woman.

In the Twenty-third Burning, Nine people.

- David Crolen's boy, of nine years old, on the second form.
- The two sons of the prince's cook, one of fourteen years, the other of ten years, from the first school.
- Melchior Hammelraann, vicar at Hach.
- Nicodemns Hirsch, a canon in the new minster.
- Christopher Berger, vicar in the new minster.
- An alumnus.
- The bailiff in the Brennerbach court and an alumnus were burnt alive.

In the Twenty-fourth Burning, Seven people.

- Two boys in the hospital.
- A rich cooper.
- Lorenz Stüber, vicar in the new minster.
- Batz, vicar in the new minster.
- Lorenz Roth, vicar in the new minster.
- A woman named Rossleins Martin.

In the Twenty-fifth Burning, Six people.

- Frederick Basser, vicar in the cathedral.
- Stab, vicar at Hach.
- Lambrecht, canon in the new minster.
- The wife of Gallus Hansen.
- A strange boy.
- Schelmerei, the huckstress.

In the Twenty-sixth Burning, Seven people.

- David Hans, a canon in the new minster.
- Weydenbusch, a senator.
- The innkeeper's wife of the Bamugarten.
- An old woman.
- The little daughter of Valkenberger was privately executed and burnt on her bier.
- The little son of the town council bailiff.
- Herr Wagner, vicar in the cathedral, was burnt alive.

In the Twenty-seventh Burning, Seven people.

- A butcher, named Kilian Hans.
- The keeper of the bridge-gate.
- A strange boy.
- A strange woman.
- Michel Wagner, vicar at Hach.
- Knor, vicar at Hach.
- The son of the female minstrel, vicar at Hach.

In the Twenty-eighth Burning, after Candlemas, 1629, Six people.

- The wife of Knertz, the butcher.
- The infant daughter of Dr. Schültz.
- A blind girl.
- Schwartz, canon at Hach.
- Ehling, a vicar.
- Bernhard Mark, vicar in the cathedral, was burnt alive.

In the Twenty-ninth Burning, Seven people.

- Viertel Beck.
- The innkeeper at Klingen.
- The bailiff of Mergelsheim.
- The wife of Beck at the Ox-tower.
- The fat noble lady [edelfrau].
- N.B. [Not Burnt] — A doctor of divinity at Hach and a canon were executed early at five o'clock in the morning and later burnt on their bier.
- A gentleman of Adel, called Junker Fleischbaum.

== Sources ==
- Kurt Baschwitz: Hexen und Hexenprozesse, Bertelsmann Verlag, München, 1990, S. 252 - 260.
- Hauber, Bibl. mag. 36. Stück, 1745, S. 807.
- Wilhelm Gottlieb Soldan und Heinrich Heppe: Geschichte der Hexenprozesse, Band 2, Reprint der Ausgabe von 1911, München, S. 17-20
- Digitale Bibliothek Band 93: Hexen, S. 904 (vgl. Soldan-Hexenprozesse, S. 20)
- Anonym: Auß dem Bißthum Würzburg: Gründliche Erzehlung der Bischof zu Würzburg (Julius Echter) das Hexenbrennen im Frankenland angefangen, wie er dasselbe fort treiben, und das Ungeziffer gentzlich außrotten wil, und allbereit zu Geroltzhoffen starke Brände gethan, hinführe alle Dienstag thun wil. Geruckt zu Tübingen 1616 (München Staatsbibliothek), abgedruckt in: Wolfgang Behringer, Hexen und Hexenprozesse in Deutschland, München, dtv Dokumente, 1993, S. 246-248
- "Würzburg witch trials". Biographisch-Bibliographisches Kirchenlexikon (BBKL) (in German). zu Philipp Adolf von Ehrenberg
- Wikisource: die vollständige Liste von Opfern der Hexenbrände in Würzburg von 1627 bis Anfang 1629
- Witchcraft Narratives in Germany: Rothenburg, 1561–1652, p. 111, at Google Books
