= Eichstätt witch trials =

Witch trials

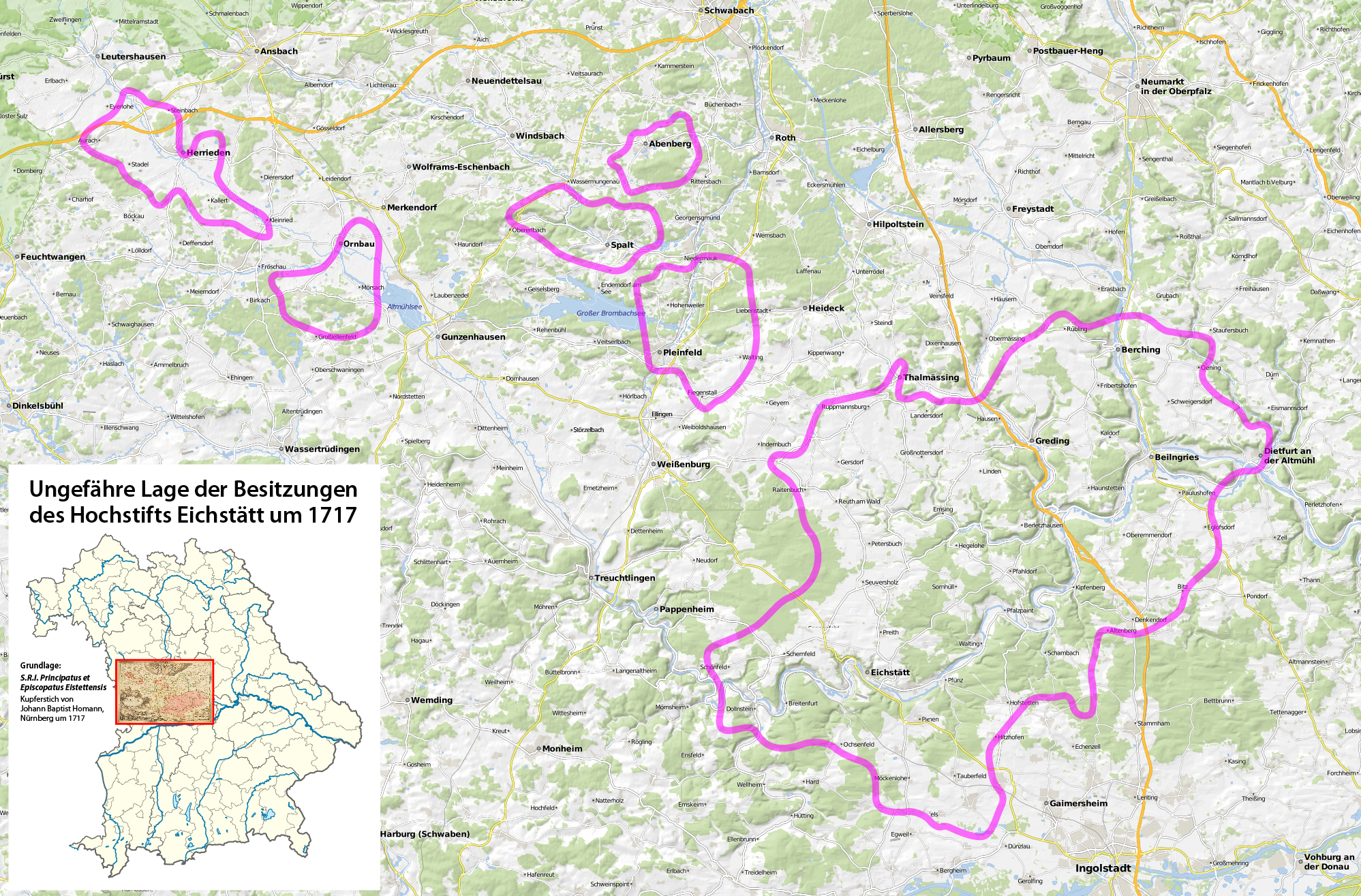
Map of the Bishopric of Eichstätt with its exclaves Herrieden, Ornbau, Spalt, Pleinfeld, and Abenberg

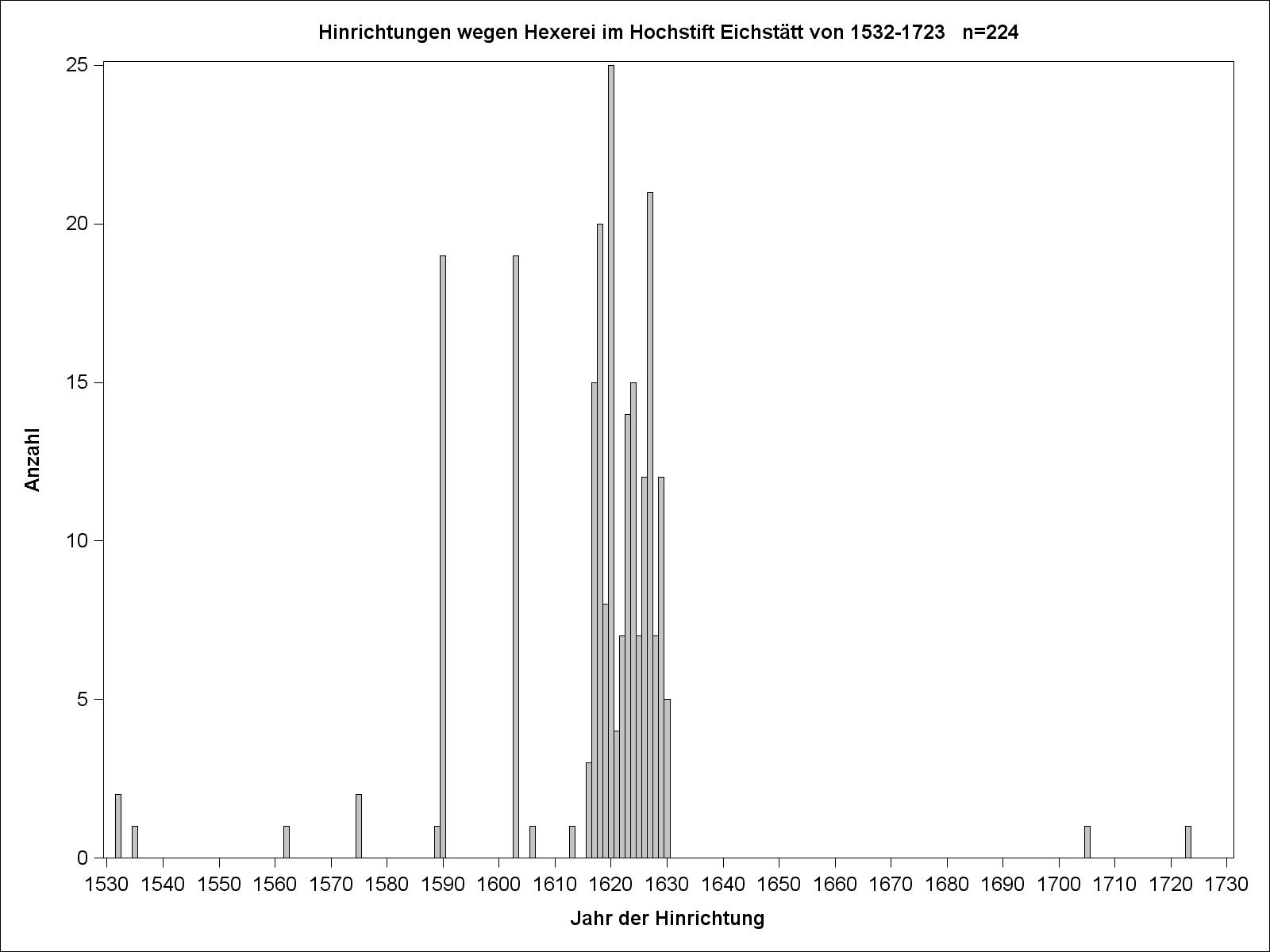
Number of executions for witchcraft per year in the Bishopric of Eichstätt from 1532 to 1723 (n=224).

The Eichstätt witch trials were a series of witch trials that took place in the Prince-Bishopric of Eichstätt (German: Hochstift Eichstätt, Fürstbistum Eichstätt), Bavaria, Germany, between 1532 and 1723. They resulted in the execution of at least 224 people (197 women and 27 men), and were among the biggest witch trials in Germany. The trials were mainly conducted under the approval of Prince Bishop Johann Christoph von Westerstetten between 1613 and 1630. The last known execution in Eichstätt was conducted in 1723.

== Persecution phases ==
=== Early phase before 1562 ===
The first known executions for witchcraft in Eichstätt were carried out in 1532 when two women were sentenced to death. The same happened to another woman in 1535. Margreth Auerhamerin was expelled from the bishopric in 1551 as she did not confess to any witchcraft of which she was accused.

=== First phase 1562–1590 ===
The first larger persecution happened under the authority of Prince-Bishop Martin von Schaumberg (1560–1590) and affected only women in the upper exclaves ("Oberes Stift") of the prince-bishopric mainly in 1590. At least 24 women were imprisoned and 23 executed, one released.

=== Second phase 1603–1612 ===
During the governance of Prince-Bishop Johann Konrad von Gemmingen (1595–1612) at least 20 women of the lower exclaves ("Unteres Stift") were put to death for witchcraft, most of them 1603.

=== Third phase 1613–1630 ===
The by far largest persecution phase of so-called witches in the Prince-Bishopric of Eichstätt began 1613 when Johann Christoph von Westerstetten became Prince-Bishop there. In 1611 and 1612, about 260 witches had already been executed under his authority in Ellwangen where he had been provost since 1603. As in Ellwangen the persecutions in Eichstätt were driven systematically and affected more and more the center of the bishopric and also men. 80% of all victims fell in his governance. After the execution of one woman in 1613 between 3 and 25 executions were carried out each year from 1616 to 1630. Altogether, at least 199 people were accused and 176 (150 women and 26 men) executed for witchcraft in Eichstätt during these 18 years.

On 15 October 1626, Margaretha Bittelmayer was arrested for witchcraft. Her husband was a councilor and town scribe for the Prince Bishop of Eichstätt. She was interrogated over the following month by a team of witch commissioners, during which she confessed to being in league with the Devil, committing a number of other witch-related offenses, and naming thirty alleged accomplices.

The massive witch pursuits ended suddenly in July 1630 when the Holy Roman Emperor Ferdinand and Prince-elector of Bavaria Maximilian prohibited the witch-hunt in the Franconian Circle at the Diet of Regensburg (1630). Westerstetten left Eichstätt in 1631 and went to Ingolstadt, where he died in 1637. The last known execution in Eichstätt was that of Walburga Rung, a 22-year-old pauper, on 22 November 1723.

== Comparison with other towns ==
Due to the large number of victims compared to the small number of inhabitants Eichstätt belongs to the center of persecution of witchcraft in the Holy Roman Empire after Würzburg, Bamberg and Fulda. The neighbouring town of Ingolstadt with its faculty of law only had 11 executions of witches.

Prisoners by group and sex
Group	Women	Men	Total
1. Executed (#1–222)	197	27	224
2. Execution unsure (#U0a–U9)	10	2	12
3. Died in prison (#H1–H4)	3	1	4
4. Released (#F1–F6)	8	0	8
5. Expelled from the bishopric (#L1)	1	0	1
Sum	219	30	249

A list of all victims is available on the German Wikipedia (Liste der wegen Hexerei Verhafteten).

== Sources ==
- Durrant, Jonathan Bryan (2007). Witchcraft, Gender, and Society in Early Modern Germany. Brill. ISBN 978-90-04-16093-4.
- Auer, Josef; Stürzl, Heinrich (2013). "Hinrichtungen wegen Hexerei in Eichstätt von 1585–1723". Blätter des Bayerischen Landesvereins für Familienkunde (in German). 76: 225–283. ISSN 0005-7118.
- Stürzl, Heinrich (2016). "Zur Hexenverfolgung im Oberen Stift des Hochstifts Eichstätt. Nachtrag zu: Hinrichtungen wegen Hexerei in Eichstätt". Blätter des Bayerischen Landesvereins für Familienkunde (in German). 79. Munich: Selbstverlag: 123–140. ISSN 0005-7118.
