= German School Nairobi =

- Deutsche Schule Nairobi
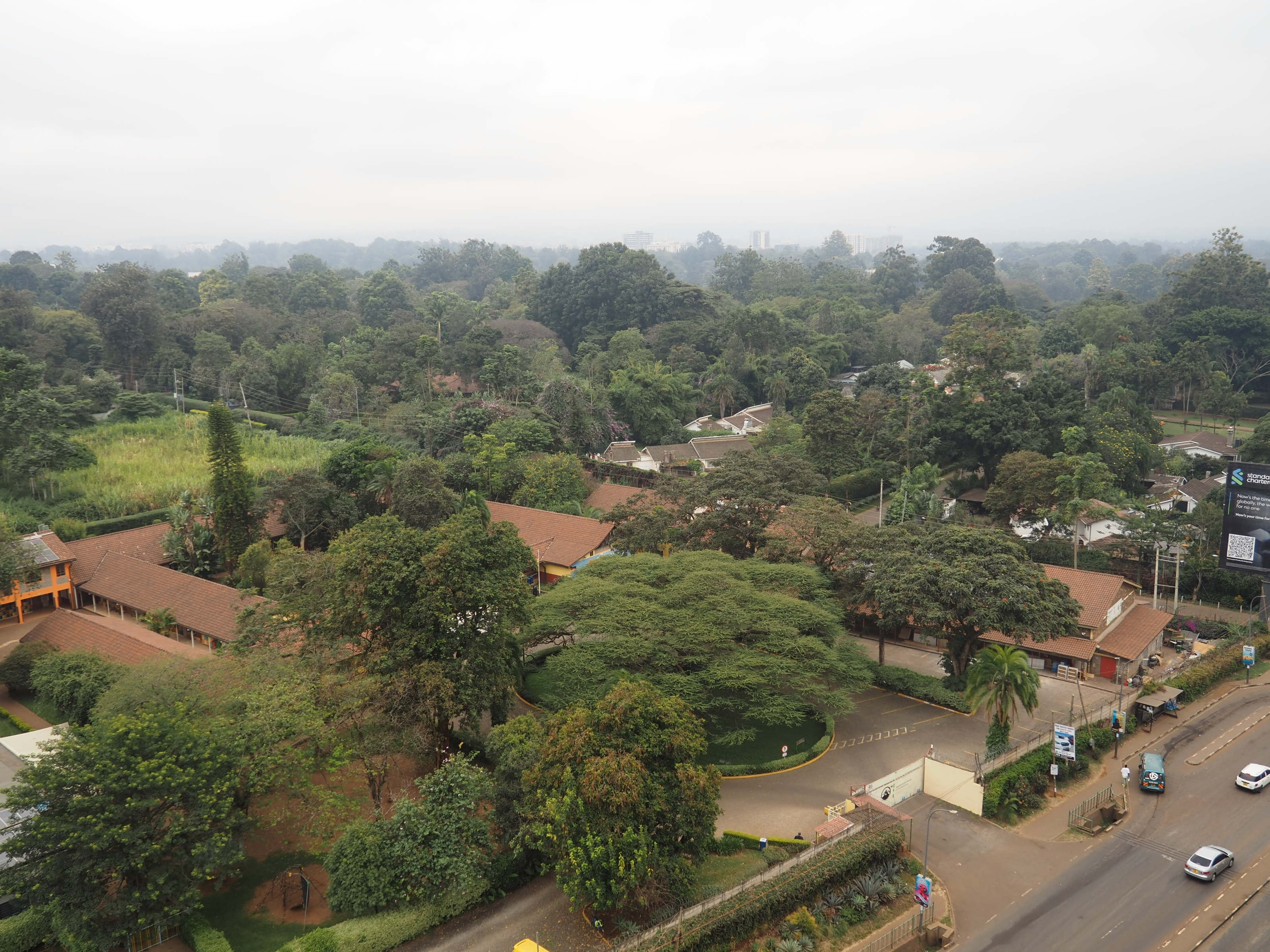

Location
- Limuru Road, opposite Village Market P.O. Box 978, 00621 Nairobi, Kenya
- Coordinates: 1°13′46″S 36°48′12″E

Information
- Established: 1969
- Website: dsnairobi.de

The German School Nairobi (German: Deutsche Schule Nairobi) is a German international school in Nairobi, Kenya. As of 2015 there are 182 students from 30 countries. The school has a twelve-year programme from primary school to upper secondary. The German School Society of Nairobi was founded in 1964 and the school itself was founded in 1969.

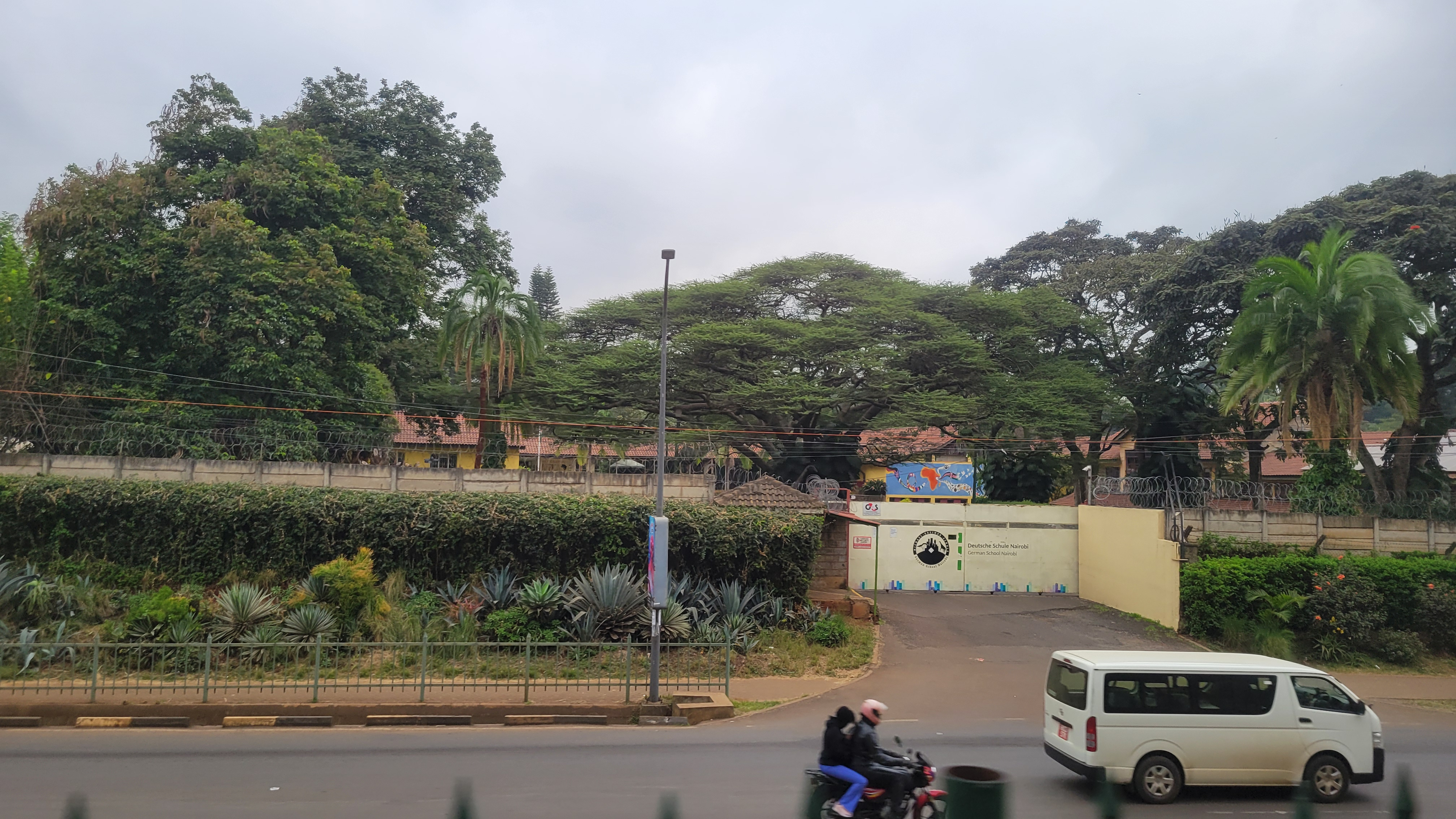

The school is also called the Michael Grzimek Schule and is named after the German wildlife conservationist Michael Grzimek who died in an aircrash in the Serengeti area.
