= Juli Zeh =

German writer (born 1974)

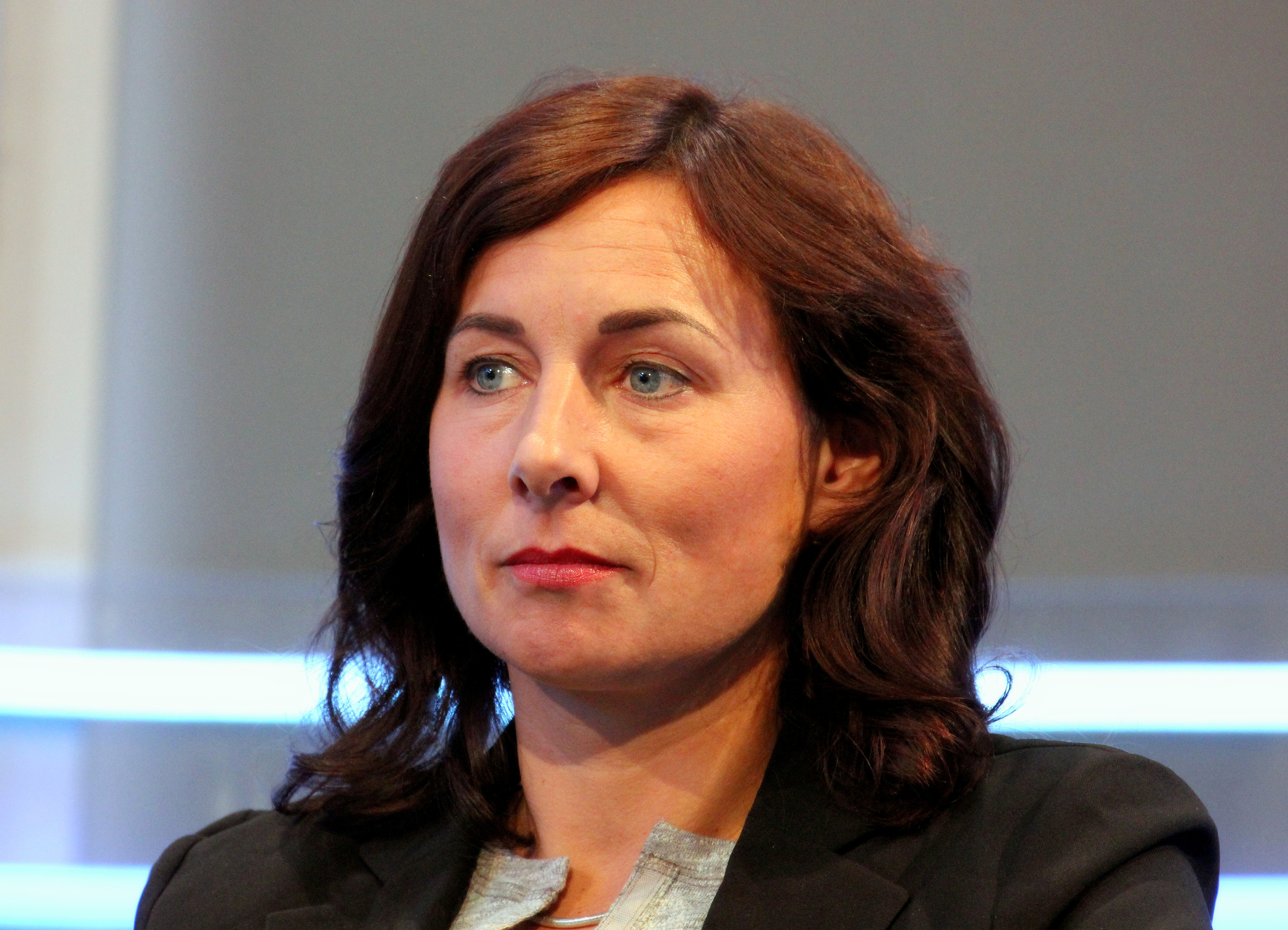
- Zeh at Leipzig Book Fair, 2016
- Born: 30 June 1974 (age 52); Bonn, West Germany
- Occupations: Writer; judge
- Years active: 2001–present
- Political party: Social Democratic Party (SPD) (2017–present)
- Awards: Solothurner Literaturpreis (2009); Thomas Mann Prize (2013); Heinrich Böll Prize (2019)

Juli Zeh (pronounced [ˈjuː.li ˈt͡seː], Julia Barbara Finck, née Zeh; born 30 June 1974) is a German writer and judge. She is known for novels such as The Method (2009), Unterleuten (2016) and About People (2021).

== Life ==
Juli Zeh is the daughter of the lawyer Wolfgang Zeh. She studied law in Passau and Leipzig, passing the Zweites Juristisches Staatsexamen – comparable equivalent to the U.S. bar exam – in 2003, and holds a doctorate in international law from Saarland University. She also has a degree from the German Institute for Literature Leipzig. She is a member of Pen Centre Germany and the Freie Akademie der Künste in Hamburg.

Since January 2019, Zeh is an honorary judge at the Constitutional Court of Brandenburg. She was one of the first signers of the Open letter on the German position regarding the Russian invasion of Ukraine in April 2022, who demanded not to support Ukraine with arms in order to "prevent a third world war".

Besides her literary work, she also publishes articles and essays for Die Zeit, Der Spiegel and FAZ. Alongside Gabor Steingart, she presents a literary podcast for the Pioneer AG.

== Literary Work ==
Zeh's first published novel was Eagles and Angels, which received the 2002 Deutscher Bücherpreis for best debut novel. It was translated into 35 languages and is settled in the world of the drug mafia internationally active lawyers. The novel has a legal focus, addressing international law.

She travelled through Bosnia-Herzegovina with her dog in 2001, which became the basis for the travel diary Die Stille ist ein Geräusch (2002). Among her other books are Das Land der Menschen, Dark Matter, Kleines Konversationslexikon für Haushunde, Gaming Instinct, Ein Hund läuft durch die Republik (2004), Decompression and The Method. In 2009 she published Corpus Delicti: ein Prozess, following the play from 2007 of the same name.

The social novel Unterleuten, published in 2016, is settled in a fictional village in Brandenburg 20 years after the reunification of Germany. The self-help book Dein Erfolg by the fictional consultant Manfred Gortz, mentioned in the novel, was published by Juli Zeh under the pseudonym in 2015, which sparked allegations of plagiarism. In 2020, the three-part film adaptation Unterleuten – Das zerrissene Dorf (Unterleuten – The Torn Village) was broadcast on ZDF.

The reoccurring motif of the duality between the village and the city can be found in her works Über Menschen (2021) and Zwischen Welten (2023), the latter was published with Simon Urban.

Her most recent novel Pony Show (2026) is classified as a legal thriller with elements of a psychological thriller, in which a court case turns into a media spectacle. In it, Juli Zeh explores issues of power abuse, toxic relationships, and the question of how negotiable ‘truth’ is in court and in literature.

In an interview with Erik Schilling she stated that her literary works are not explicitly political, but morally and socially relevant. A novel should not be one-sided and remain open to all possible interpretations.

== Personal life ==
Zeh is married and has two children. Since 2017, she has been a member of the Social Democratic Party of Germany. Zeh was considered for a nomination of the Federal President, but she has currently declined the nomination, stating her own reason as: “because I would not be able to reconcile the dual demands of my career and family life.”

== Awards ==
Zeh was awarded multiple times for her work, including the Thomas Mann Prize (2013), the Heinrich Böll Prize (2019) and the Media Control Platinum Award for selling more than six million books (2026). In 2018, she was awarded the Order of Merit of the Federal Republic of Germany and was elected as a judge at the Constitutional Court of the State of Brandenburg.

== Selected bibliography ==
Novels

Year	English title	Original title	ISBN	Notes
2001	Eagles and Angels	Adler und Engel	978-3-442-72926-5	
2004	Gaming Instinct	Spieltrieb	978-3-89561-056-1	
2007	Dark Matter	Schilf	978-3-89561-431-6	US title: In Free Fall
2009	The Method	Corpus Delicti	978-3-89561-434-7	
2012	Decompression	Nullzeit	978-3-89561-436-1	First English translation in 2014 by Harvill Secker. Translated by John Cullen
2016	(not yet translated)	Unterleuten. Roman	978-3-630-87487-6	lit. 'Amongpeople' (a fictional place name)
2017	Empty Hearts	Leere Herzen. Roman	978-3-630-87523-1	Translated by John Cullen
2018	New Year	Neujahr. Roman	978-3-630-87572-9	Translated by Alta L. Price
2021	About People	Über Menschen	978-3-630-87667-2	Translated by Alta L. Price
2023	(not yet translated)	Zwischen Welten	978-3-630-87741-9	With Simon Urban; lit. 'Between Worlds'
2026	(not yet translated)	Pony Show	978-3-630-87865-2	

Other

Year	English title	Original title	ISBN	Notes
2002	(not yet translated)	Die Stille ist ein Geräusch. Eine Fahrt durch Bosnien	978-3-442-73104-6	lit. 'Silence Is a Sound. A Journey through Bosnia'
2004	(not yet translated)	Ein Hund läuft durch die Republik	978-3-89561-057-8	Editor; lit. 'A Dog Runs through the Republic'
2005	(not yet translated)	Kleines Konversationslexikon für Haushunde	978-3-89561-058-5	lit. 'Little Conversation Lexicon for Household Dogs'
2006	(not yet translated)	Alles auf dem Rasen	978-3-89561-059-2	lit. 'Everything on the Lawn'; roughly 'The Full Monty'
2008	(not yet translated)	Das Land der Menschen	978-3-89561-432-3	lit. 'The Land of Humans'
2009	(not yet translated)	Angriff auf die Freiheit. Sicherheitswahn, Überwachungsstaat und der Abbau bürgerlicher Rechte	978-3-423-34602-3	With Ilija Trojanow; lit. 'Attack on Freedom. Security Madness, Surveillance State and the Dismantling of Civil Rights'; excerpt in English in German Studies Review, 38, no. 2, (2015): 271–284 ISSN 0149-7952
2012	(not yet translated)	Die Diktatur der Demokraten. Warum ohne Recht kein Staat zu machen ist	978-3-89684-095-0	lit. 'The Dictatorship of Democrats. Why no State Can Be Made Without Law'
2013	(not yet translated)	Good Morning, Boys and Girls. Theaterstücke	978-3-89561-438-5	lit. 'Good Morning, Boys and Girls. Plays'
2013	(not yet translated)	Treideln. Frankfurter Poetikvorlesungen	978-3-89561-437-8	lit. 'Towing. Frankfurt Poetics Lectures'
2014	(not yet translated)	Nachts sind das Tiere. Essays	978-3-89561-440-8	lit. 'At Night Are the Beasts. Essays'
2015	(not yet translated)	Dein Erfolg	978-3-442-83942-1	lit. 'Your Success'. Written under the pseudonym Manfred Gortz, a fictitious business consultant. The fictitious author and the book were mentioned later in Zeh's novel Unterleuten
2018	(not yet translated)	Das Turbo-Ich. Der Mensch im Kommunikationszeitalter		lit. 'The Turbo-I: Man in the Communication Age'
2019	(not yet translated)	Gebrauchsanweisung für Pferde	978-3-492-27762-4	lit. 'User Guide for Horses'
