= The Method (novel) =

2009 novel by Juli Zeh

- First edition
- Author: Juli Zeh
- Original title: Corpus Delicti
- Language: German
- Publisher: Schöffling & Co.
- Publication date: 2009
- Publication place: Germany
- Pages: 263
- ISBN: 3895614343

The Method (German: Corpus Delicti: Ein Prozess) is a 2009 novel by the German writer Juli Zeh. The story is set in a future "health dictatorship", where laws have been written to optimize the citizens' health. The novel was developed from Zeh's 2007 play with the same title. Reviews in major German newspapers complimented Zeh's focus points and narrative structure, and compared the book to works by authors such as Ray Bradbury and Friedrich Dürrenmatt.

== Characters ==
Characters constellation (German)

Mia Holl

Mia Holl is a 34-year-old biologist and is the main character of the novel. After the death of her brother, Moritz Holl, she becomes lonely and depressed. Throughout the book she becomes a rebel against the government. Her dedication to the METHOD is not strong enough to be actively against it. The name 'Mia Holl' comes from the name Maria Holl, a woman who was thought to be a witch in the 17th century.

Moritz Holl

Moritz Holl is Mia's 27-year-old brother, who even before the story starts commits suicide in jail, where he was awaiting a trial for murder. He loves nature but is also an independent rebel who wants nothing more than freedom. Because of his complex thoughts he can't find any other person to talk to and therefore invented the "Ideal Beloved", who he passes on to Mia just before his death. The name 'Moritz Holl' comes from another character named 'Max' (via the household combination Max and Moritz) in another Novel from Juli Zeh.

The Ideal Beloved

The Ideal Beloved is a fictional character who helps Mia through the difficult period after her brother's death. She has the same ideology and thoughts as Moritz and could be his ghost. After Mia's emotional wounds are healed, she disappears, since her quest has been accomplished.

Bell

Bell is a public prosecutor and a strict follower of the METHOD. Because of this, he is constantly in conflict with Sophie, a young judge.

Lutz Rosentreter

Rosentreter is Mia's lawyer during the court proceedings where she hopes to prove her brother's innocence. He is silently opposed to the METHOD, since he was denied a relationship with the love of his life due to government policy. Since then he has been secretly seeking revenge.

Kramer

Heinrich Kramer (named after the actual name of Henricus Institor) is Mia's main adversary in the novel. He is an influential proponent of the METHOD, but often comes across as a nice gentleman who wants to explain the system to everyone. In reality he is a fanatic who can only see his own goals.

Wuermer

Wuermer is the moderator of a talk-show. He idolizes Kramer so much that one could see him as Kramer's student. A crown witness in the trial, he claims that Mia and Moritz founded their own rebellion group.

Sophie

Sophie is young and strong-willed. She is the first judge in the trial against Mia. She mediates in the disputes between Bell and Rosentreter; through her decisions she changes the outcome of the trial in Mia's benefit, but loses her job and is transferred to another provincial jurisdiction.

Hutschneider

Hutschneider is a 60-year-old judge close to retirement who takes part in the trial against Mia. He tries to end the trial as fast as possible to avoid any claims that he opposes the METHOD.

== See also ==
- 2009 in literature
- German literature
