= Luchterhand Literaturverlag =

German publisher

Luchterhand Literarturverlag
- Parent company: Verlagsgruppe Penguin Random House
- Status: Active
- Founded: 1924
- Founder: Karl Wilhelm Luchterhand
- Country of origin: Germany
- Headquarters location: Munich
- Key people: Georg Reuchlein
- Official website: www.luchterhand-verlag.de

The Luchterhand Literaturverlag is a German publisher of contemporary literature based in Munich. It was founded in 1924, and was acquired by Random House in 2001. Luchterhand is considered one of the most prestigious publishers in Germany. Publications include literature from Günter Grass and Christa Wolf and many others.

== History ==
In 1924, Hermann Karl Wilhelm Luchterhand founded Luchterhand Publisher in Berlin, dedicated to taxation and law. He then published an information pamphlet on tax, which added to the earlier publications of forms and manuals for the payroll office. In 1934, he appointed Eduard Reifferscheid as managing partner. In 1936, Luchterhand went back to his private life. The reasons for Hermann Luchterhand's withdrawal are still unknown. After the end of World War II, the company's headquarters moved during the reconstruction from Berlin to Neuwied. Alfred Andersch, along with many others, participated with his magazine articles and drawings to create an additional literary program. The first literary publications appeared in 1954.

== Program ==
The literary program of Luchterhand has existed since the year 1954. The publisher released several works from numerous important authors: such as "Die Vorzüge der Windhühner", the first book by Günter Grass which was followed in 1959 by the novel "The Tin Drum". Besides Grass were, Peter Bichsel, Mikhail Bulgakov, Max von der Grün, Peter Härtling, Helmut Heissenbüttel, Günter Herburger, Arno Holz, Ernst Jandl, Hermann Kant, Kurt Marti, Pablo Neruda, Anna Seghers, Michael Scharang, Robert Wolfgang Schnell, Claude Simon, Aleksandr Solzhenitsyn, Jörg Steiner, Carl Sternheim, Gabriele Wohmann, Christa Wolf, William Butler Yeats and many other authors represented in the program of Luchterhand. An important part of the program had up until the 1990s licensed editions from DDR-authors. In 1993, the Luchterhand collection was sold to dtv Verlagsgesellschaft. Luchterhand has works from more than 100 writers available. Every year, over twenty new titles appear. Among the more well-known works from recent years include "Gleis 4" by Franz Hohler, "Das Ungeheuer" Terézia Mora, "Die Erfindung des Lebens" by Hanns-Josef Ortheil and also "Vor dem Fest" by Saša Stanišić.
