= Bayerische Akademie der Schönen Künste =

Academy of arts in Munich, Germany

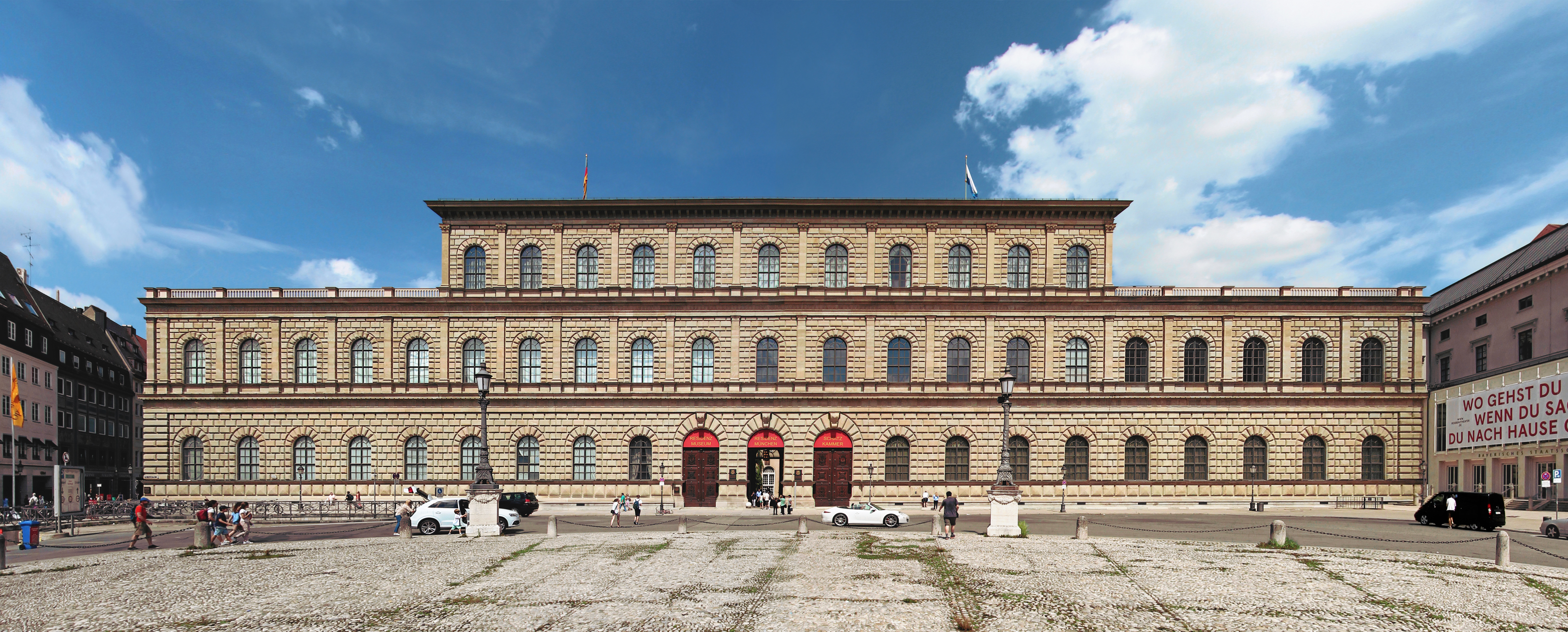
Königsbau of the Munich Residenz

Bayerische Akademie der Schönen Künste in München (Bavarian Academy of Fine Arts) is an association of renowned personalities in Munich, Bavaria. It was founded by the Free State of Bavaria in 1948, continuing a tradition established in 1808 by the Royal Academy of Arts in Munich.

The academy organizes panel discussions, exhibitions, readings, lectures and concerts. Until 1968, the academy had its headquarters at Prinz-Carl-Palais, after which they received a temporary quarters at the Caroline court. Since 1972 it has had its headquarters in the Königsbau (King's tract) of the Munich Residenz.

In 2019, Winfried Nerdinger was elected president of the Academy. In 2025, Nerdinger was re-elected to a third term as president. In 2024, Salome Kammer became the institution's first female director.

== Prizes ==
The academy has awarded several prizes, some called Ehrung (honour), Ehrenring (ring of honour), Ehrengabe (gift of honour):

- Großer Literaturpreis der Bayerischen Akademie der Schönen Künste
  - 1950–85 Literaturpreis (literature prize)
  - 1986–2007 Großer Literaturpreis (great literature prize)
  - since 2008 Thomas Mann-Preis (Thomas Mann Prize)
- Literarische Ehrengabe
  - 1952–85
  - since 1985 Wilhelm-Hausenstein-Ehrung
- Friedrich-Ludwig-von-Sckell-Ehrenring (since 1967; for landscaping architecture)
- Ernst von Siemens Musikpreis (since 1974; in collaboration with the Ernst von Siemens Musikstiftung, for music)
- Adelbert-von-Chamisso-Preis (1985–2005; in collaboration with the Robert Bosch Stiftung; for literature)
- Wilhelm-Hausenstein-Ehrung for inter-cultural "Vermittlung" (since 1986)
- Karl-Rössing-Reisestipendium (travel scholarship, since 1986)
- Friedrich-Baur-Preis (since 1990; in collaboration with the foundation Friedrich-Baur-Stiftung; for artists in the regions Franken, Oberpfalz and Niederbayern)
- Auftragskomposition der Akademie (commissioned composition of the academy, since 1990)
- Horst-Bienek-Preis für Lyrik (since 1991, for lyric poetry)
- Gerda-und-Günter-Bialas-Preis (since 1998; in collaboration with the GEMA-Stiftung; for music)
- Rainer-Malkowski-Preis (since 2006; in collaboration with the foundation Rainer-Malkowski-Stiftung; for literature)
- Preis Neues Hören (New Listening, since 2006; in collaboration with the foundation Neue Musik im Dialog, Köln; for presentation of contemporary music)
- Kunststipendium (art scholarship)
