= Joseph-Breitbach-Preis =

German literary award

Joseph Breitbach Prize
- Native name: Joseph-Breitbach-Preis
- Description: Excellence in German-language literature
- Location: Koblenz, Germany
- Country: Germany
- Presented by: Akademie der Wissenschaften und der Literatur Mainz; Joseph Breitbach Foundation
- Reward: €50,000
- Website: www.joseph-breitbach-preis.de

Joseph-Breitbach-Preis (Joseph Breitbach Prize) is a literary prize awarded by the Akademie der Wissenschaften und der Literatur Mainz (Academy of Sciences and Literature of Mainz) in Germany and the Joseph Breitbach Foundation. Established in 1998, the prize is worth 50,000 euros and is awarded annually in Koblenz, birthplace of writer Joseph Breitbach (1903–1980), for whom the prize is named.

== Winners ==
- 1998: Hans Boesch, Friedhelm Kemp, Brigitte Kronauer
- 1999: Reinhard Jirgl, Wolf Lepenies, Rainer Malkowski
- 2000: Ilse Aichinger, W. G. Sebald, Markus Werner
- 2001: Thomas Hürlimann, Ingo Schulze, Dieter Wellershoff
- 2002: Elazar Benyoëtz, Erika Burkart, Robert Menasse
- 2003: Christoph Meckel, Herta Müller, Harald Weinrich
- 2004: Raoul Schrott
- 2005: Georges-Arthur Goldschmidt
- 2006: Wulf Kirsten
- 2007: Friedrich Christian Delius
- 2008: Marcel Beyer
- 2009: Ursula Krechel
- 2010: Michael Krüger
- 2011: Hans Joachim Schädlich
- 2012: Kurt Flasch
- 2013: Jenny Erpenbeck
- 2014: Navid Kermani
- 2015: Thomas Lehr
- 2016: Reiner Stach
- 2017: Dea Loher
- 2018: Arno Geiger
- 2019: Thomas Hettche
- 2020: Nora Bossong
- 2021: Karl-Heinz Ott
- 2022: Natascha Wodin
- 2023: Marion Poschmann
- 2024: Anne Weber
- 2025: Frank Witzel
- 2026: Jochen Schmidt
