= Günter de Bruyn =

German writer (1926–2020)

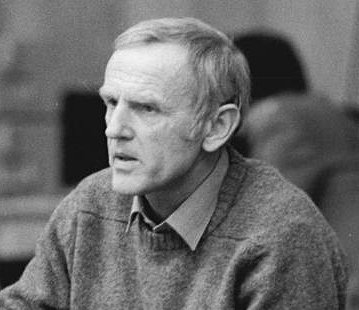
Günter de Bruyn at the Berliner Begegnung zur Friedensförderung in 1981

Günter de Bruyn (German: [də bʀɔʏn]; 1 November 1926 – 4 October 2020) was a German author.

== Life ==
Günter de Bruyn was born in Berlin in November 1926; his father Carl was a Catholic from Bavaria. Günter served as a Luftwaffenhelfer and soldier in World War II. Wounded, he was then held in custody by the United States as a prisoner of war; after his release he found a job as a farm worker in Hesse. After his return to Berlin, he trained as a Neulehrer in Potsdam. Until 1949 he worked as a teacher in a village near Rathenow in Brandenburg.

Subsequently, he trained as a librarian and worked at the Zentralinstitut für Bibliothekswesen (Central Institute for Library Knowledge) in East Berlin from 1953 to 1961. After 1961 de Bruyn lived as a freelance writer. From 1965 to 1978, he was a member of the Zentralvorstand des Schriftstellerverbandes der DDR (Central Executive Committee of the Literary Association of East Germany); he was a member of the presidency of the PEN Centre of East Germany from 1974 to 1982.

In October 1989, Günter de Bruyn declined to accept the National Prize of East Germany.

De Bruyn later lived in the village of Görsdorf (part of the municipality of Tauche) in Brandenburg, as well as in Berlin. He was a member of the German PEN Centre.

He died in October 2020 at the age of 93.

== Literary activity ==
Günter de Bruyn's works range from the frequently autobiographically colored realist novels and narratives which explain critiques of the private lives of the artists in East Germany to essays on literary science and historical themes, particularly Prussian history.

He edited a series of works from 18th and 19th century authors in Berlin and Brandenburg, which appeared under the title Märkischer Dichtergarten.

He had great success in the 1990s with the two volumes of his autobiography, Zwischenbilanz and Vierzig Jahre.

== Awards ==
- 1964 Heinrich Mann Prize
- 1981 Lion-Feuchtwanger-Preis
- 1989 Thomas-Mann-Preis
- 1990 Heinrich-Böll-Preis of the City of Cologne
- 1991 Honorary degree of the University of Freiburg
- 1993 Großer Literaturpreis der Bayerischen Akademie der Schönen Künste (Greater Literary Prize of the Bavarian Academy of Fine Arts)
- 1994 Order of Merit of the Federal Republic of Germany
- 1996 Literary Prize of the Konrad Adenauer Foundation
- 1996 Literary Prize of the state of Brandenburg
- 1997 Jean-Paul Prize
- 1999 Honorary degree of the Humboldt University of Berlin
- 1999 Fontane Prize of the City of Neuruppin
- 2000 Ernst-Robert-Curtius-Preis for essays; Friedrich-Schiedel-Literaturpreis
- 2005 Order of Merit of Brandenburg
- 2006 Jacob Grimm German Language Prize
- 2007 Gleim Literary Prize
- 2007 Hanns Martin Schleyer Prize
- 2008 Hoffmann von Fallersleben Prize
- 2009 Max Herrmann Prize
- 2011 Johann-Heinrich-Merck-Preis

== Works ==
- Über die Arbeit in Freihandbibliotheken, Berlin 1957
- Hochzeit in Weltzow, Halle (Saale) 1960
- Wiedersehen an der Spree, Halle (Saale) 1960
- Einführung in die Systematik für allgemeinbildende Bibliotheken, Berlin 1961
- Der Hohlweg, Halle (Saale) 1963
- Ein schwarzer, abgrundtiefer See, Halle (Saale) 1963
- Maskeraden, Halle (Saale) 1966
- Buridans Esel, Halle (Saale) 1968 (first published in 1963 in «Sinn und Form»)
- Preisverleihung, Halle (Saale) 1972
- Tristan und Isolde, Berlin 1975
- Das Leben des Jean Paul Friedrich Richter, Halle (Saale) 1975
- Märkische Forschungen, Halle (Saale) et al. 1978
- Im Querschnitt, Halle (Saale) et al. 1979
- Babylon, Leipzig 1980
- Neue Herrlichkeit, Frankfurt am Main 1984
- Lesefreuden, Frankfurt am Main 1986
- Frauendienst, Halle (Saale) et al. 1986
- Brandenburg, München et al. 1991 (with Hauke Dressler)
- Im Spreeland, Freiburg im Breisgau 1991 (with Erhard Pansegrau)
- Jubelschreie, Trauergesänge, Frankfurt am Main 1991
- Zwischenbilanz, Frankfurt am Main 1992
- Mein Brandenburg, Frankfurt am Main 1993 (with Barbara Klemm)
- Das erzählte Ich, Frankfurt am Main 1995
- Was ich noch schreiben will, Göttingen 1995 (with Ingo Hermann)
- Irritation und Verstehen, Stuttgart 1995
- Vierzig Jahre, Frankfurt am Main 1996
- Altersbetrachtungen über den alten Fontane, Berlin 1999
- Die Finckensteins, Berlin 1999
- Deutsche Zustände, Frankfurt am Main 1999
- Preußens Luise. Vom Entstehen und Vergehen einer Legende, Berlin 2001 (on the legacy of Louise of Mecklenburg-Strelitz, Queen consort of Prussia)
- Unzeitgemäßes, Frankfurt am Main 2001
- Unter den Linden, Berlin 2003
- Abseits. Liebeserklärungen an eine Landschaft. Mit Fotos von Rüdiger Südhoff, Frankfurt am Main 2005
- Als Poesie gut. Schicksale aus Berlins Kunstepoche 1786 bis 1807. Frankfurt am Main 2006
- Die Zeit der schweren Not: Schicksale aus dem Kulturleben Berlins 1807 bis 1815, S. Fischer, Frankfurt am Main 2010, ISBN 978-3-10-009834-4. E-Book ISBN 978-3-10-400743-4
- Gräfin Elisa. Eine Lebens- und Liebesgeschichte, S. Fischer, Frankfurt am Main 2012, ISBN 978-3-10-009643-2. E-Book ISBN 978-3-10-402070-9
- Der neunzigste Geburtstag. Ein ländliches Idyll, S. Fischer, Frankfurt am Main 2018, ISBN 978-3-10-397390-7

=== Editorial work ===
- Das Lästerkabinett, Leipzig 1970
- Jean Paul: Leben des Quintus Fixlein, Berlin 1976
- Theodor Gottlieb von Hippel: Über die Ehe, Berlin 1979
- Friedrich de la Motte Fouqué: Ritter und Geister, Berlin 1980 (Märkischer Dichtergarten)
- Friedrich Wilhelm August Schmidt: Einfalt und Natur, Berlin 1981 (Märkischer Dichtergarten)
- Christoph Friedrich Nicolai: Vertraute Briefe von Adelheid B. an ihre Freundin Julie S. Freuden des jungen Werthers, Berlin 1982 (Märkischer Dichtergarten)
- Ludwig Tieck: Die männliche Mutter und andere Liebes-,Lebens-, Spott- und Schauergeschichten, Berlin 1983 (Märkischer Dichtergarten)
- Rahel Levin: Rahels erste Liebe, Berlin 1985 (Märkischer Dichtergarten)
- Ernst Theodor Amadeus Hoffmann: Gespenster in der Friedrichstadt, Berlin 1986 (Märkischer Dichtergarten)
- Theodor Fontane: Die schönsten Wanderungen durch die Mark Brandenburg, Berlin 1988 (Märkischer Dichtergarten)
- Friedrich August Ludwig von der Marwitz: Nachrichten aus meinem Leben, Berlin 1989 (Märkischer Dichtergarten)
- Friedrichshagen und seine Dichter. Arkadien in Preußen, Berlin 1992 (Märkischer Dichtergarten)
- Moritz Heimann: Die Mark, wo sie am märkischsten ist, Berlin 1996 (Märkischer Dichtergarten)

=== Film adaptations ===
- 1978: Hochzeit in Weltzow
- 1980: Glück im Hinterhaus, based on Buridans Esel
- 1981: Märkische Forschungen
