= Navid Kermani =

German writer and orientalist (born 1967)

- نوید کرمانی
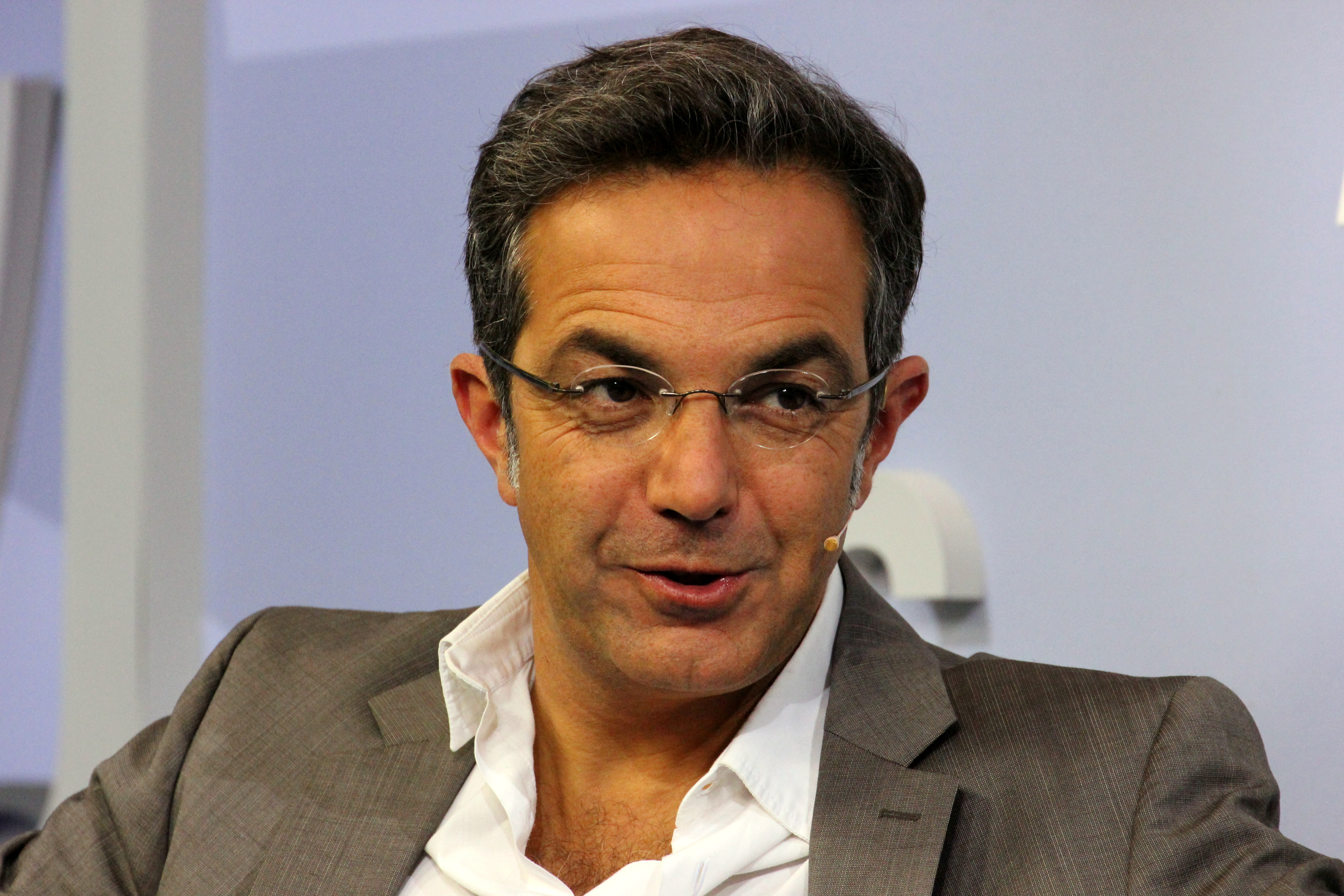
- Kermani at Frankfurt Book Fair 2015
- Born: 27 November 1967 (age 58); Siegen, West Germany
- Occupations: Novelist, essayist

Navid Kermani (German: [naˈviːd kɛʁˈmaːni]; Persian: نوید کرمانی; [næˈviːd keɾmɒːˈniː]; born 27 November 1967 in Siegen) is a German writer and orientalist. He is the author of several novels as well as books and essays on Islam, the Middle East and Christian-Muslim dialogue. He has won numerous prizes for his literary and academic work, including the Peace Prize of the German Publishers' Association on 18 June 2015.

== Family and personal life ==
Kermani was born in Siegen as the fourth son of Iranian parents who immigrated to the Federal Republic of Germany in 1959. A medical doctor, his father worked at the Catholic St. Mary's Hospital in Siegen. Kermani's three older brothers are also practicing physicians. Navid Kermani has both German and Iranian citizenship. He grew up in the historically Protestant city of Siegen, where he attended the academic high schools Fürst-Johann-Moritz-Gymnasium and Gymnasium am Rosterberg (later renamed Peter-Paul-Rubens-Gymnasium). After graduating from high school, Kermani interned with Roberto Ciulli at the theater Theater an der Ruhr in the city of Mülheim before moving to Cologne in 1988 to pursue university studies. Until 2020, Kermani was married to Islamic studies scholar Katajun Amirpur; they are the parents of two daughters. Kermani has been a fan of the soccer club 1. FC Köln since 1971.

== Scholarly career ==
Kermani majored in Middle Eastern languages and literature, with minors in philosophy and theater studies, at the University of Cologne, Cairo University, and the University of Bonn. During his semester breaks, he worked as an assistant director and later as a dramaturge at the municipal theaters Schauspiel Frankfurt and Theater an der Ruhr. Kermani wrote his master's thesis in 1993 at the University of Bonn (supervisors: Stefan Wild and Monika Gronke) on the persecuted Egyptian Koranic scholar Nasr Hamid Abu Zaid, whom he later met in Cairo and who had a formative impact on Kermani's approach to religious studies. With the support of the Studienstiftung des deutschen Volkes, Kermani wrote a dissertation entitled Gott ist schön (God is Beautiful), again under the supervision of Arabist Stefan Wild and Iranian studies scholar Monika Gronke. Kermani received his doctorate in Middle Eastern languages and literature at the University of Bonn in 1998. In 2006, he completed his postdoctoral dissertation entitled The Terror of God – Attar, Job, and the Metaphysical Revolt. From 2000 to 2003, Kermani held a long-term fellowship at the Wissenschaftskolleg zu Berlin (Institute for Advanced Studies Berlin), where he headed the Modernity and Islam working group. He initiated several international research projects, including the project Jewish and Islamic Hermeneutics as Cultural Criticism. This gave rise to a proposal for a Jewish-Islamic academy in Berlin. In 2002, Kermani had his debut as an independent author with the book Die von Neil Young Getöteten [Those Killed by Neil Young]. In 2003, Kermani left the Wissenschaftskolleg to return to Cologne, where he has since been living as a freelance writer. He resides in the Eigelstein district, not far from Ebertplatz. The original idea for the Akademie der Künste der Welt (Academy of the Arts of the World), which opened in Cologne on October 27, 2012, was conceived in 2007 by Kermani, together with Bernd M. Scherer, director of the Haus der Kulturen der Welt (House of World Cultures) in Berlin.

== Journalism and literary career ==
At the age of fifteen, while still in high school, Kermani began to work as a freelancer for the local editorial office of the regional daily newspaper Westfälische Rundschau. During his university studies, he wrote for national German newspapers, working as a regular contributor to the arts and culture section of the daily newspaper Frankfurter Allgemeine Zeitung from 1996 to 2000. Since 2006, Kermani has been co-hosting the Literarischer Salon [Literary Salon] in Cologne's Stadtgarten with fellow writer Guy Helminger. Kermani spent 2008 as a Villa Massimo fellow in Rome. Beginning in 2012, he co-directed the "Herzzentrum" ["Heart Center"] at Hamburg's Thalia Theater together with dramaturge Carl Hegemann. Kermani's literary work thematizes the human experience of extremes in everyday life, music, art, sexuality and in the face of death. His novels and essayistic books straddle the boundaries between autobiography and fiction, while his academic writings focus on the aesthetics of the Koran and Islamic mysticism.

Kermani is also well known as a journalist who reports from crisis areas around the world. In September 2014, he reported from Iraq for the news magazine Der Spiegel. In October 2015, he traveled in the direction of the refugees to meet them on their route in the opposite direction, from Budapest to Turkey. Many of his reports, which he wrote primarily for the newspaper Frankfurter Allgemeine Zeitung, the news magazine Der Spiegel and the weekly newspaper Die Zeit, were also published in expanded versions as books, becoming bestsellers. In cooperation with the Avicenna relief organization founded by his father Djavad Kermani, Kermani initiated fundraising campaigns for aid projects in Aceh (Indonesia), Lesbos, Madagascar and Tigray after returning from his reporting trips. Kermani's books have been translated into numerous languages. In his public statements and speeches, Kermani regularly comments on issues of society, politics and religion. Jan-Werner Müller described him in the New York Review of Books as one of Germany's most thought-provoking intellectual voices. From 2009 to 2012, Kermani was a senior fellow at the Kulturwissenschaftliches Institut (KWI) Institute for Advanced Humanities Study in Essen. In 2009, he was appointed a corresponding member of the Akademie der Wissenschaften [Academy of Sciences] in Hamburg. In the summer semester of 2010, Kermani served as guest lecturer in poetics at the Goethe University Frankfurt, where he gave the Frankfurter Poetikvorlesungen [Frankfurt Poetics Lectures], which were later published as a book entitled Über den Zufall. Jean Paul, Hölderlin und der Roman, den ich schreibe [On Contingency: Jean Paul, Hölderlin, and the Novel I Am Writing]. In the winter semester of 2011/12, Kermani delivered the Göttingen Poetics Lecture series, and in 2014, the Mainz Poetics Lecture series. In the summer semester of 2013, he was a visiting professor for Islamic intellectual history at the Goethe University Frankfurt. In the spring of 2014, he taught German literature as Max Kade visiting professor at Dartmouth College in New Hampshire. From 2017 to 2020, Kermani taught creative writing as a visiting professor at the Academy of Media Arts Cologne. On 22 October 2023, Kermani read texts on Beethoven's Ninth Symphony at the Berlin Philharmonic during a concert by the German Symphony Orchestra Berlin under Robin Ticciati.

== Candidacy relating to elections of the German Federal president ==
At the 2010 election for the German Federal President, Kermani served as a member of the 14th Federal Assembly at the recommendation of the Green Party of Hessen. And in 2017, Kermani was mentioned as a potential candidate for German Federal President in that year's federal presidential election. According to a report in Der Spiegel, then-SPD chairman Sigmar Gabriel, in cooperation with other parties, had intended to nominate Kermani to run for Federal President. However, the plan failed due to resistance from the Greens. In particular, Kermani was rejected by the Realos wing of the Green Party, because the Realos were aiming to form a Black-Green coalition (i.e. a coalition with the Christian Democrats) subsequent to the general federal elections and thus did not want to be seen as endorsing a Red-Red-Green (i.e. Social Democratic, Left Party and Green Party) coalition.

== Iraq War (2003) ==
Kermani opposed the Iraq War. This opposition notwithstanding, Kermani viewed Saddam Hussein's regime as a terrible terrorist regime, the end of which he welcomed. In the arts section of the Süddeutsche Zeitung and in his book Strategie der Eskalation, Kermani wrote in 2005 that not only the U.S. but also Europe had failed in the Iraq War—and that the Old World was on the verge of repeating the same mistakes in the conflict with Iran. Kermani stated that the "American project to reorganize the Middle East" appeared to be far closer to the hearts of most Iranians today "than the Europeans' policy, which tends to present itself as altruistic". In the article, Kermani calls Europe's pretense that reform efforts still exist in Iran an act of self-deception. As evidence, he cites the suppression of the freedom of the press by Iran's rulers, the imprisonment of opposition figures, and the manipulation of parliamentary elections to restore a "conservative" majority. "War is the wrong means, but liberation is not the wrong end goal", Kermani notes.

== Commemorative address on the 50th anniversary of the reopening of the Vienna Burgtheater (2005) ==
At the gala evening marking the 50th anniversary of the reopening of the Vienna Burgtheater following its destruction in World War II, Kermani criticized Europe as a community of values, calling into question the EU's very refugee and asylum policies. After all, Kermani reminded his audience, poets have been dreaming of a Europe without borders and without nationalism for centuries.

== Construction of the Cologne mosque (2007) ==
On June 4, 2007, Kermani published a report in the Süddeutsche Zeitung about a public hearing on the construction of a mosque in the district of Cologne-Ehrenfeld. In the report, Kermani expressed enthusiasm for the open atmosphere of discussion. Attesting that the citizens present embodied "democracy in its purest form", Kermani noted that there is a "broad, cosmopolitan middle" in Cologne whose members are far more tolerant than many intellectuals.

== Cultural Award of the State of Hesse (2009) ==
In 2009, following a temporary revocation of the award, Kermani received the Hesse Cultural Award — along with Cardinal Karl Lehmann; the former president of the Church of Hesse-Nassau; Peter Steinacker; and the vice president of the Central Council of Jews, Salomon Korn. That year's ceremony was held under the theme of interreligious tolerance. The prize was offered to Kermani on March 20, 2009, after the originally intended recipient, Fuat Sezgin, had declined to accept it on the grounds that his co-recipient, Salomon Korn, supported Israel's military actions. On May 13, 2009, Kermani learned that the award intended for him had been revoked. He went on, however, to describe how this view had been shaken by what he described as the aesthetic experience: "For the first time, I thought: I — not just 'one' — I could believe in a cross." On April 24, 2009, Lehmann stated in a letter to Hesse's Minister President Roland Koch that Lehmann "cannot accept the award under these circumstances". Commentators described Lehmann's tone as "subtly ... defamatory", "smug", "mean-spirited", and "condescending"; Kermani, too, found it "defamatory". In the end, after a conversation with Kermani, Lehmann and Steinacker decided to accept the award jointly. The award was ultimately presented to the four laureates on November 26, 2009. At the ceremony, Minister President Koch apologized to Kermani. Kermani donated his prize money to Franz Meurer, the pastor of the Catholic parish of St. Theodor in Cologne-Vingst.

== Arab Spring (2011) ==
In February 2011, Kermani praised the Arab Spring, noting that the demonstrators had taken to the streets for "freedom, dignity, the rule of law, and equal opportunity". He criticized the policies of Western governments. "Criminality and complicity (with dictatorships)", Kermani wrote, "seem to have become the norm in some European government palaces". He spoke positively of Al Jazeera's role, observing that the network had contributed significantly to a culture of debate. Kermani dismissed the coverage by German media—in which, according to Kermani, people "ramble on about how state and politics are one and the same in Islam"—as a "religiously tinged colonial lens". The protests, Kermani argued, were not about religion. He also spoke out against multiculturalism as a form of culturalism that legitimizes dictatorships, saying that, "Conversely, discussants fall into relativism and claim that people elsewhere do not want democracy at all because they are supposedly simply different and have different traditions." Such a view would work against the original leftist goals of equality for all people and the leveling of living conditions. In general, the "overemphasis on otherness, whether of migrants or Hartz IV [welfare] recipients, ... serves primarily to reinforce differences—especially economic differences".

== "The Triumph of Vulgar Rationalism" (2012) ==
Amid intense public debate surrounding the Cologne Regional Court's 2012 ruling on circumcision, Kermani published an article in the daily newspaper Süddeutsche Zeitung titled "The Triumph of Vulgar Rationalism". In this article, Kermani accused the Cologne Regional Court of "casually and in the blink of an eye declaring four thousand years of religious history obsolete". The Enlightenment, Kermani argues, does not merely signify the rule of reason, but also an acknowledgment of reason's limitations. "Then again, vulgar rationalism—as expressed in the Cologne Regional Court's ruling—elevates one's own, that is, contemporary, understanding to an absolute, unconditional value." Joachim Gauck has since adopted the term vulgar rationalism in his statements on the circumcision debate.

== Speech at the Ceremony Marking the 65th Anniversary of the Basic Law, Germany's Constitution (2014) ==
On May 23, 2014, the German Parliament Bundestag held a ceremony commemorating the proclamation of the Basic Law on May 23, 1949. Kermani was invited as the keynote speaker. In his speech, he analyzed the language of the Basic Law, comparing its impact to that of the Luther Bible. Kermani discussed the historic progress made in the postwar period and noted that the Basic Law had created a new reality. Kermani praised the Federal Republic of Germany for upholding constitutional norms. He also commended German society for its willingness to bring about integration and its efforts in this regard. He mentioned Willy Brandt several times. Referring to Brandt, Kermani noted, "If I were to name a single day, a single event, a single gesture in postwar German history for which the word 'dignity' seems appropriate, (…) it would be Brandt's kneeling in Warsaw." Kermani sharply criticized the restriction of the right to asylum through the 1993 amendment to the Basic Law (asylum compromise), which he described as a distortion of Article 16a and a mutilation of the Constitution. Nevertheless, he emphasized the opportunities that the Federal Republic of Germany has offered immigrants. He concluded his speech—on their behalf—with the words Thank you, Germany.

Some members of the CDU/CSU parliamentary group criticized the speech as one-sided or biased; Georg Nüßlein (CSU) left the chamber. In the German media, however, the speech was well received and positively discussed. The University of Tübingen honored the speech as Speech of the Year 2014.

== Statement on the Islamic State Offensive in the Middle East (2014) ==
In August 2014 in the daily newspaper Berliner Zeitung, Kermani called for the Islamic State (IS) in Iraq to be stopped, even by military means. He compared the conflict's significance to that of World War I and warned of a genocide against Christians, Yazidis, and other religious minorities. In his statement, he emphasized the importance of humanitarian corridors for refugees and warned of a Pol Pot-style version of Islam stretching from the borders of Iran to the Mediterranean coast. In his Peace Prize acceptance speech in October 2015, Kermani called for action against the Islamic State, action that would have to be taken militarily, if necessary, but, above all, through diplomacy and civil society, however, much more resolutely than before.

While saying that he was not calling for war, he pointed out that the war could no longer be ended in Syria and Iraq alone. It could only be ended by the powers behind the opposing armies and militias: Iran, Turkey, the Gulf states, Russia, and also the West.

== Charlie Hebdo Speech in Cologne (2015) ==
On January 14, 2015, Kermani delivered a speech at the Appellhofplatz in Cologne during the memorial rally "We Are Charlie – For Freedom and Diversity." The rally was organized by the coalition Köln stellt sich quer [Cologne puts up resistance] in memory of the victims of the Islamist-motivated terrorist attack on the editorial office of the satirical magazine Charlie Hebdo in Paris. Garnering nationwide attention, Kermani's speech was widely discussed. It directed itselfprimarily at Muslims and the frequently repeated argument that Islam has nothing to do with terror and violence. At the same time, Kermani advocated for assigning greater importance to compassion and, first and foremost, to remaining free.

== Acceptance Speech for the Peace Prize of the German Book Trade (2015) ==
Kermani's moving acceptance speech, Über die Grenzen – Jacques Mourad und die Liebe in Syrien [Across/AboutBorders — Jacques Mourad and Love in Syria] was widely received and became the subject of heated debate. He dedicated his speech, given at Frankfurt's Paulskirche, to the Christian priest Jacques Mourad, who feels a connection to Islam. Mouradwas abducted from the Mar Elian monastery in Syria by terrorists of the so-called Islamic State and was later freed by Muslims. Islam and Christianity, religious traditions that appear to be bitterly opposed can also signify the transcendence ofboundaries. Kermani focused his speech on the beauty and spiritual depth of Islam, as well as on terrorism committed in the name of Islam. He also addressed the West's failings in its dealings with countries such as Saudi Arabia. In this context, Kemani lamented the lack of public discourse on these issues in Germany. He concluded his speech with a prayer for the priests, for the Christians in Syria, and for freedom in the countries of the Middle East.

== Die Kölner Botschaft, auch Rheinische Botschaft (2015/16) ==
[The Cologne Declaration, also known as the Rhineland Declaration (2015/16)] On New Year's Eve from December 31, 2015, to January 1, 2016 in Cologne, numerous sexual assaults on women were committed by groups of young men, primarily from North Africa and the Arab world, particularly at Cologne Central Station and in the area surrounding the cathedral. This led to Kermani's initiating the Cologne Declaration, which numerous prominent figures from Cologne and the Rhinelandsigned and which read, in part: "Zero tolerance for sexual violence, opposition against organized crime, accountability for administrative shortcomings, and an end to xenophobic incitement". The Declaration was translated into many languages, including Arabic and Persian, received international attention, and spurrednumerous public civic dialogues. In recognition of this declaration, Kermani was awarded the Citizens' Prize of the German Newspapers in 2017.

== Speech at LMU Munich (2017) ==
In a speech marking the 20th anniversary of the Chair of Jewish History and Culture at LMU Munich, Kermani spoke about his feelings during a visit to the Auschwitz concentration camp memorial site and about how living and working in the German language entails a sense of responsibility for the crimes of World War II.

== Statement addressing the disinvitation of Lisa Eckhart (2020) ==
At the opening of the Hamburg Harbourfront Literature Festival in September 2020, Kermani criticized two authors who had refused to share the stage with Lisa Eckhart. According to Kermani, this refusal led to Eckhart's disinvitation. Eckhart had been invited on account of her debut novel Omama, "[…] the stage is a public space, and since an independent jury had selected her novel, she had the same right to enter that public space […]."
The two authors clarified that they had not wanted for Eckhart to be disinvited.

== Statement on the Generic Masculine in the German Language (2022) ==
In 2022 in the weekly newspaper Die Zeit, Kermani presented his view on the use of the generic masculine from a writer's perspective. In this essay, Kermani notes that German is the only language "from which the gender-neutral use of masculine nouns and pronouns could disappear entirely." He deeply regrets this possible development. After all, the generic masculine "allows for a great deal of linguistic differentiation," whereas its abolition would promote the sexualization of language and "would not advance gender equality one bit." As an example, Kermani mentions that German female authors who did not wish to explicitly emphasize their gender still naturally referred to themselves as "Autoren" as recently as the 1970s. But now, the generic masculine is on the decline and is often no longer understood:

"No matter how often a linguist may point out that a word like 'reader' ('Leser')is a generic term and that, strictly speaking, one should say 'male readers' when referring exclusively to men—as soon as no one hears female readers implied in the word 'reader' anymore, the scholar is, at best, correct only from a historical linguistic perspective."

– Navid Kermani: Mann, Frau, völlig egal [Man, Woman, It Doesn't Matter at All]

According to Kermani, the unique stylistic achievement of the generic masculine is that it does a good job of doing justice to "the diverse transitions, overlaps, and ambivalences" that define what it means to be human. The generic masculine does better than other linguistic means of expression that assign a biological sex to everything and everyone. "Language […] categorizes; that is its nature as a system of signs. In other words, language assigns the diverse, ambivalent, and—in its complexity—ultimately infinite world of experience to a necessarily limited number of concepts. […] Language speaks of 'man' and 'woman,' even though all wisdom traditions, in one way or another, offer the insight that no human nature—and certainly not our sexuality—fits into a rigid gender dichotomy. […] Gender attributions do not fall into two categories, but nor do they fall into 27." In German, the generic masculine provides a means of expression that entirely dispenses with such attributions, according to Kermani whocompares and contrasts German with Persian. Persian has no gender at all and thus allows writers, among other things, to compose poetry which is potentially homoerotic in that the poetry can remain entirely open as to whether the beloved is a man or a woman. In German, on the other hand—at least in prose—the gender of the beloved must always be revealed, which robs the reader's imagination of preciousspace. On the other hand, however, the generic masculine in German often allows for nuances that would not be possible in other languages, according to Kermani: "For example, when I send an email to my friends to invite them to my birthday party, I purposely do not address them as 'male and female friends' ('Freundinnen und Freunde')." As Kermani states, the use of the generic masculine is frequently understood as a provocation—that is, as the opposite of what it actually achieves: a renunciation of sexualization. At the same time, Kermani notes, for reasons of politeness and in public situations where the generic masculine might be perceived as an affront, hehimself will opt for a form of address that includes both male and female genders.

If the presence of a masculine grammatical form came to indicate that it no longer ignored gender identity but, on the contrary, that it overemphasized gender identity, the generic masculine would be dead for good.

- Navid Kermani: Mann, Frau, völlig egal [Man, Woman, It Doesn't Matter at All]

== Protests and War in Iran (2022) ==
Kermani is one of the most prominent supporters of the protest movement known under the slogan "Woman, Life, Freedom" ("Frau, Leben, Freiheit") in Iran. Especially during the 2022 protests, he publicly supported the demonstrators, criticizing German politics at the same time. As early as October 2022, Kermani wrote several contributions to the weekly newspaper Die Zeit in which he called on the German federal government to more explicitly endorse the protest movement. For example, on Oktober 6, Oktober 19, November 3 among other things, he addressed the possibility of sanctions and Germany's policy toward Iran. In addition, Kermani spoke out publicly on several occasions about the protest movement. In a speech in Cologne he criticized the response of the German administration. He took the federal government and in particular then Foreign Minister Annalena Baerbock to task for their restrained response. In a public-television interview featured on the program heute-journal (ZDF), Kermaniremarked about then Federal Chancellor Olaf Scholz: "Not taking sides when someone is shooting at another person—that's a kind of taking sides, too: the side of the one who's shooting." Kermani called on Germany to take a clearer stance and emphasized the need to uphold international law, particularly in light of Germany's history. The following day, Olaf Scholz criticized the Iranian leadership for the first time in connection with the protests. Shortly thereafter, Scholz intensified his criticism, asking, “What kind of government shoots at its own citizens?” At an event on March 3, 2026 in the Hamburg Theater Deutsches Schauspielhaus the dispute between Kermani and Scholz was once again discussed publicly. Both commented in retrospect on their dispute at the time and their differing views on Germany’s policy toward Iran. The event took place as part of the NDR-public-radio culture and literature series “Der Norden liest.”In an interview with the public radio station Deutschlandfunk von January 16, 2026, following the bloody crackdown on the protests, Kermani warned of further escalation that could possibly lead to civil war, and called for an international diplomatic initiative to support sustainable political transformation in Iran.

== Charity and volunteer work ==
In 1994, Kermani founded a language and cultural center in his parents' hometown of Isfahan, which he ran until 1997, the year the center had to close due to deteriorating German-Iranian relations. Since fall of 2014, Kermani has been serving as a patron of the initiative Willkommen für Flüchtlinge [Welcome to Refugees] via the Ehrenamt and Flüchtlinge [Volunteering and Refugees] project run by the Kölner Freiwilligenagentur [Cologne Volunteer Agency] which coordinates its offerings with the Kölner Flüchtlingsrat [Cologne Refugee Council].

== Reception of Kermani's work ==
Gustav Seibt of the newspaper Süddeutsche Zeitung highlights Kermani's demonstrated ability to converse effortlessly with the positions of Herder, Goethe, Rückert and the Orientalism of German Classicism, and to comment just as competently on Lessing, Kleist, Hölderlin and Kafka as on the aesthetics of the Koran and Islamic mysticism. Kermani's book on Canadian rock musician Neil Young, Das Buch der von Neil Young Getöteten [The Book of Those Killed by Neil Young, 2002], has been reviewed numerous times, having been a great success with critics and audiences alike. At the end of 2023, publishing house Suhrkamp released this book in its tenth edition. The Neil Young book has been adapted for the stage several times, including at the Thalia Theater in Hamburg. In addition, a radio station was named for the book. Since 2010, this radio station has been presenting music online that Neil Young would like or that people who also like Neil Young would like. In November 2005, Kermani staged Hosea at the Schauspiel Köln theater, a play based on biblical texts and on works by Friedrich Hebbel. Kermani's book Der Schrecken Gottes – Attar, Hiob und die metaphysische Revolte (The Terror of God – Attar, Job, and the Metaphysical Revolt) published in 2005, was described by Uwe Justus Wenzel of the Swiss newspaper Neue Zürcher Zeitung as "healthily disturbing" and by Karl-Josef Kuschel of the Frankfurter Rundschau as "literally boundary-breaking". The Austrian public radio station Ö1 Kulturmagazin drew parallels to Kermani's earlier works, noting that its comparative religious metaphysics were also influenced by the question of theodicy. Kermani received the Joseph Breitbach Prize in 2014 for his book Dein Name [Your Name]. and the Thomas Mann Prize in 2024 for his novel Das Alphabet bis S [The Alphabet up to S], which in form and content is a sequel to Dein Name. Advocating for the ideological neutrality of the state Kermani nevertheless criticizes "religious illiteracy" associated with the "complete suppression of religion", which he says leads to a "fundamental spiritual impoverishment of society". Identifying religious tolerance and freedom of religion as important European values, Kermani emphatically calls for the consideration of the beliefs and worldviews of others in the spirit of the Enlightenment. No human being can uncover the ultimate mysteries such as why something exists rather than nothing. According to Kermani, that is why religion came into being in the first place: in it, humans find ways of dealing with what they cannot explain. Religion, then, does not run contrary to the Enlightenment; rather, religion gives expression to what transcends human reason. Kermani notes that precisely to ignore the limits of human reason is what actually constitutes a more anti-Enlightenment stance.

== Overview and assessment of Kermani's literary work by Torsten Hoffmann ==
Torsten Hoffmann, a literary scholar, a professor at the University of Stuttgart, and a recognized and long-standing expert on Kermani's extensive literary work, classifies Kermani's narrative work as follows: Most of Kermani's literary texts draw on an auto-fictionalapproach (in his most extensive novel, "Dein Name" [Your Name], the protagonist is also named "Navid Kermani"). Furthermore, they are characterizing by a particular interest in fundamental human experiences such as birth, love, and death, along with a programmatic combination of (sometimes drastic) everydayness with an affinity for art (including literature, music, film, and the visual arts) and religiosity. The boundaries between his works of fiction and works more commonly regarded as nonfiction (such as "Ungläubiges Staunen" (Wonder Beyond Belief) or "Jeder soll von da, wo er ist, einen Schritt näher kommen" (Everyone, Wherever You Are, Come One Step Closer) and travelogues are fluid. For while Kermani's nonfiction books often employ literary narrative techniques, conversely, many of his works of fiction contain essayistic passages.

=== Das Buch der von Neil Young Getöteten (2002) ===
Kermani's first literary text appeared in 2002: "Das Buch der von Neil Young Getöteten" [The Book of Those Killed by Neil Young] which combines three themes: first, the music of Neil Young, to whose songs numerous song interpretations are dedicated; second, the astonishing therapeutic effect of Neil Young's music on the first-person narrator's daughter while suffering from three-month colic and during her first year of life; and third, the narrator's biography, which has been significantly influenced by Neil Young (whose importance to the narrator is as obvious as the narrator's tendency toward ironic exaggeration). Omnipresent (self-)irony as the book's foremost narrative principle allows the narrator to integrate the major literary themes, ranging from God to love to death, into the flow of his narration without making the text seem overloaded. Whereas the first half of the text is shaped by philosophical and literary reminiscences where Neil Young's lyrics undergo exacting philological analysis, the second half focuses on the mystical dimensions that the narrator regards as constituting the core of Neil Young's music and of his own listening experience. The enigmatic title of the book refers to "The Book of Those Killed by the Koran", an historic manuscript that tells of mystics who heard the Koran and died as a result. For the narrator, this calls to mind the existential significance of Neil Young's music for his own life, giving him the impulse to write the Neil Young book in the first place.

=== "Vierzig Leben" (2014) ===
Kermani's second literary work, Vierzig Leben [Forty Lives], contains forty short stories in which approximately the same number of characters (mostly appearing only once) are featured, with one detail from their lives being recounted. Each text is dedicated to what the blurb calls "principal words": those special human states already noted around the year 1000 by the Sufi poet Khadje Abdollah Ansari, which the list of words that introduces the text references. The list of words catalogs such terms as Love, Zeal, Longing, Concern, and Thirst. However, the stories, which are titled, for instance, On Hope, On Thirst, and On Duty, do not contain philosophical reflections on these concepts (as is the case, for example, in Adorno's similarly structured Minima Moralia, to which the narrator alludes as an important point of reference). Rather, these respective title words appear as parts of the anecdotal narratives. The tone of the anecdotes is reminiscent of oral storytelling, but at the same time they also contain intricately composed, long, nested sentences. This diversity of motifs and moods forms a counterbalance to the work's temporal and spatial condensation: all the events reported originate in the immediate present and deal with people who have at least a loose connection to the city of Cologne. Furthermore, the texts are held together by a first-person narrator who is at times reminiscent of the author and who insists he heard all the stories from relatives, friends, or casual acquaintances.

=== "Gott ist schön" (Dissertation 1998) ===
A parallel (including excursions into the scholarly realm) is discernable here with Kermani's narratively oriented 1999 dissertation "Gott ist schön" (God is Beautiful). The dissertation, after all, investigates the (musical) aesthetics of the Koran and contains a subchapter entitled "Those Killed by the Koran".

=== "Du sollst" (2005) ===
Published in 2005, Du sollst [Thou Shalt] is Kermani's first literary work that does not features a first-person narrator. Narrated by an uninvolved narrator, the text provides insights into the most intimate moments of ten heterosexual couples (with a slight preponderance of the male perspective). We do not learn much about the characters' lives; not even their names are mentioned. Instead, the text focuses on brief sex and bedroomscenes – echoing Arthur Schnitzler's controversial play La Ronde. The narrative focuses less on sexual practices and more on the conversations and thoughts that unfold during these encounters. An insurmountable closeness, as it were, marks almost all of the relationships. Apart from one short story in which the possibility of symmetrical and emphatic love appears ["Honor Thy Father and Mother"], the relationships presented are characterized by misunderstandings and deceptions, fears and dependencies, power struggles and violence. At the height of physical union, many of the characters feel a painful loneliness—this dialectic of love being the subject of the texts' special psycho-microscopic attention. The first ten stories are each preceded by one of the Ten Commandments, to which the texts refer with varying degrees of directness.

=== "Ayda, Bär und Hase" (2017) ===
The children's book "Ayda, Bär und Hase" [Ayda, Bear and Rabbit] revisits the father-daughter relationship motif from the Neil Young book. The father, called Bâbâ, resembles other protagonists in Kermani's books (and the author himself): he has Iranian parents, lives in Cologne, and is a fan of the soccer team 1. FC Cologne and of Neil Young. The focus, however, is now on his five-year-old daughter Ayda, who is ill at ease with her small stature and befriends a bear and a rabbit who can talk. The book's central themes include multicultural tolerance, the insight "that you can be happy even if not everything is perfect," and overcoming fears together.

=== "Kurzmitteilung" (2014) ===
Kurzmitteilung [Text Message] is Kermani's first text that he classified as a novel. It is dedicated to the Cologne actress Claudia Fenner, who died of a stroke in July 2005 at the age of 40. In the novel, Maike Anfang, who worked for Ford, dies on the same date and just as unexpectedly. She was supposed to organize an event together with the first-person narrator Dariusch, a freelance event manager. The initiating event of the novel is the text message that gives the book its title, in which Dariusch learns of the sudden death of Maike Anfang, whom he met only fleetingly, while on vacation. The novel narrates the first few days after Maike Anfang's death, with the question of how to communicate appropriately about death serving as a leitmotif. The protagonist, Dariusch, is less affected by the personal loss than by the sudden confrontation with his own mortality. Although he is able to speak to the relatives of the deceased in an educated and empathetic manner, he is presented as a caricature of a dim-witted, sex-obsessed macho who ends up going on and on about his experience of an awakening in a self-discovery center in the United States.

=== "Dein Name" (2015) ===
Considering that Kermani described this novel in his Frankfurt lectures on poetics as a failed attempt to capture the specific shock of death in a conventional literary form, we have to read this assessment against the backdrop of his extensive work on his major novel Dein Name [Your Name], which was originally conceived as a book of the dead and is committed to a different kind of remembrance of the dead.

With its 1,229 densely printed pages, Dein Name is Kermani's longest work. Classified by many critics as his magnum opus, it represents one of the most original works of autofiction in contemporary literature. The text is narrated by a character named Navid Kermani, who shares many, but not all, biographical details with the author. The narrative combines the styles of, among other genres, a diary, a relationship and family novel, a travel reportage, an internet blog, an epistolary or text messages novel, a poetological and scholarly treatise, a political essay, and—presented as its core—obituary-like commemorative texts. These short texts are dedicated to individuals almost all of whom were close to the author and whom he lost during the period between June 8, 2006, and June 11, 2011, while he was working on this novel.

On a second narrative level, the novel tells the story of its own fashioning, not only in terms of poetics and the writing process, but in terms of the author-character's entire life. The omnipresent transience and fragility of life is thus countered by an attempt to preserve the present in as comprehensive and uncensored a manner as possible through language. A third narrative thread concerns the biography of the narrator's Iranian grandfather, who died in Isfahan in the mid-1980sand wrote his autobiography shortly before his death. Having discovered the autobiography in 2006, the protagonist quotes, paraphrases, and comments on it with increasing detail. Reproducing numerous objections to the novel's manuscript versions voiced by a wide range of first readers, the novel is highly self-referential and already provides its own criticism. Unwilling or unable to refute such criticisms, the textexplicitly embraces its occasionally poorly written, embarrassing, or sentimental aspects as evidence of failure. Dein Name is closely intertwined with Kermani's Frankfurt poetics lectures from the 2010 summer semester, which can be read as a preface to the novel (they include annotated manuscript passages from the novel, which in turn quotes from the lectures and comments on them).

=== Über den Zufall. Jean Paul, Hölderlin und der Roman, den ich schreibe (2012) ===
Dein Name ist eng verwoben mit Kermanis Frankfurter Poetikvorlesungen aus dem Sommersemester 2010, die sich als Vorrede zum Roman lesen lassen (sie enthalten u. a. kommentierte Manuskriptpassagen des Romans, der wiederum aus den Vorlesungen zitiert und diese kommentiert). In den unter dem Titel Über den Zufall. Jean Paul, Hölderlin und der Roman, den ich schreibe 2012 auch als Buch veröffentlichten fünf Vorlesungen wird weniger Bilanz gezogen als vielmehr die zukünftige Poetik des unabgeschlossenen Romanprojekts Dein Name erkundet. Jean Paul und Friedrich Hölderlin repräsentieren dabei komplementäre und sich immer wieder gegenseitig in Schach haltende Erzählambitionen: Während Jean Paul den Romanschreiber dazu anspornt, die Totalität des Irdischen in seinen Text zu integrieren, steht Hölderlin für die Seelenreise durch den Himmel, für die Sehnsucht nach dem Absoluten, der sinnlichen wie übersinnlichen Ekstase.

=== "Große Liebe" (2014) ===
After Dein Name with its encompassing, globally oriented poetics came a work of fiction entitled "Große Liebe" (Love Writ Large), a tightly composed text that is much more homogeneous in terms of language and thematics. The first-person narrator, now in his forties, looks back on his first love, which he felt as a 15-year-old for the slightly older Jutta, a high school student in her senior year. Although the relationship lasted only a few days, its intensity still seems unsurpassed to the narrator decades later. The love story is told in one hundred chapters, which from the outset also reflect on the writing process itself. Over the course of the narrative, it becomes increasingly clear that the narrator is less concerned with his own biography than with the search for a general psycho-physical matrix of first love. He correlates his own experience of love with the teachings on love found in Persian literature, specifically from the tenth to the fourteenth centuries. The narrator reflects on his youthful relationship on the basis of one of the most famous pairs of lovers in Middle Eastern literature, Leila and Majnun, weaving his thoughts together with the reflections on love of the early Islamic mystics. The sacralization of sexuality is already discussed here, as is the comparability of ecstatic loss of self in religion, sexuality, and drug-induced intoxication. Ultimately, the text does not strive for an account of the relationship with Jutta that is as accurate as possible, but rather for a metanarrative: the narration of the narration of this love.

=== "Sozusagen Paris" (2016) ===
"Sozusagen Paris"' (Paris, So to Speak) constitutes a sequel to the previous novel: after a public reading from "Love Writ Large", the first-person narrator is approached by his childhood sweetheart, who is now the mayor of a small town. This sequel describes the first encounter between the two characters after thirty years, which lasts from the moment of their reunion after the public reading until the next morning. Overall, the text complements its predecessor: whereas the former dealt with the ecstasy of first love, the latter focuses on long-term love, specifically in light of Jutta's 23-year marriage. Whereas "Love Writ Large" was told from the man's perspective, the nighttime conversation in Paris, So to Speak is shaped by the woman's point of view —for the first time in Kermani's work, a female voice is at the center of the text. Like "Love Writ Large, Paris So to Speak" also aims at a supra-individual exploration of love, but it is anchored differently: instead of early Islamic mysticism, it's the French marriage novels of the nineteenth century up to Marcel Proust which serve as a foil here for modern love. This shifts the reflection on love from a general anthropological to a historical perspective. In particular, the important role of their children to the couple's life, lifestyle, and emotional stability serves to emphasize distinctions from older marriage novels and to highlight specifics of love and cohabitation in the 21st century. The novel is permeated by poetological, often self-deprecating reflections, which are discussed in the form of possible objections Jutta or the editor might raise against the novel—and which culminate in an emphatic endorsement of the power of literature.

=== "Das Alphabet bis S" (2023) ===
"Das Alphabet bis S" [The Alphabet up to the letter S], Kermani's most expansive novel since "Dein Name", can be read as a complementary text to it: while "Dein Name" leads up to a separation between the male first-person narrator and his partner (without the breakup actually occurring in the novel), Das "Alphabet bis S" looks back on a failed marriage. It is noteworthy that "Das Alphabet" is told from the perspective of an unnamed female narrator, whose undated (but numbered) diary entries structure the text. The novel's composition is more stringent than in "Dein Name", partly because the 365 chapters—beginning with New Year's Day—cover exactly one year. And partly because—as the title suggests—the self-proclaimed "reader- writer" works her way alphabetically through the unread books on her bookshelf over the course of the year, reaching the surnames beginning with S. Kermani's play with autofiction familiar from previous texts takes on a new direction here in that the protagonist's life, her reading, and thinking show numerous parallels to the author Navid Kermani (from her Muslim background to her work as a writer to her affinity for soccer to her committed commemoration of the dead). In addition, the combination of narrative and essayistic passages resembles the technique used in "Dein Name". On the one hand, then, the separation between author and narrator seems obvious here. On the other hand, the text ironically suggests that it might be read as a femalely inverted mirror version of Kermani's own life and writing. Importantly, this results in a mixture of comic effects and of a serious aspiration to reflect on the continuing relevance of gender roles in the 21st century. The text can thus also be read as a literary plea for overcoming narrowly conceived identity politics and identity-based divisions.

== Overview of religious studies work as characterized by Klaus von Stosch ==
Translated from German into English by Friederike von Schwerin-High (professor of German studies at Pomona College since 2005; PhD from UMass Amherst in comparative literature; research interests: narrative theory, translation studies and eighteenth-century literature).

Klaus von Stosch, a comparative theologian from Bonn who has held the Chair of Systematic Theology at the University of Bonn since the 2021/2022 winter semester, has been familiar with Kermani's religious studies work since its inception and classifies it as follows:

Even though Kermani does not consider himself a theologian, his texts on Islam and religious studies clearly go beyond a purely descriptive approach. In many places, the texts are a plea for a new take on the Koran and on Islamic tradition, but also for a more comprehensive view of other religions. Emphasizing the mystical, experiential dimension of religions, his texts tend to approach religion on an aesthetic level. However, his writings do not only address the union of human beings with God, which is paramount tomysticism, and to the associated notions of love and happiness. He is also concerned with the glory and terror of God, in other words, with all aspects of God's inexpressible mystery. From a theological point of view, Kermani attaches importance to the unity of God and the unity of all being in a decidedly classical sense. Everything comes from the One and returns to it—like the breath of human beings. However, this means that human beings must also reconcile everything with God and His reality and cannot keep the abysses and cracks of reality separate from the mystery of God. It is thisstruggle with the ambiguity of God and reality that informs Kermani's work. A plea against reducing God to a legitimation for political strategies or human wishful thinking gives shape to his theological concern.

Kermani's first Islamic studies text, his master's thesis, appeared in 1996. In it, he developed the first foundations of his thinking by way of an investigation into the Egyptian reform theologian Nasr Hamid Abu Zaid. Demonstrating not only Abu Zaid's reformist approach to revelatory thinking, Kermani also analyzes in detail why Abu Zaid came into conflict with the political and religious authorities in Egypt: not because of theological innovations, but because Abu Zaiddepicts how elites have seized upon tradition in order to seek a monopoly on the interpretation of the Koran and in order to manipulate its message in accordance with their interests.

=== Gott ist schön (dissertation 1998) ===
In his dissertation Gott ist schön (God is Beautiful), which focuses on reception aesthetics and philology, Kermani shows how prominently Islamic tradition perceives the aesthetic dimension of the Koran. The Koran is described as a beguiling, captivating work of art, its beauty capturing people's hearts with an irresistible appeal. The beauty and clarity of the Koran is thus proof of its divine inspiration. According to this conception, God communicates in the Koran in an aesthetically mediated way in hopes to be understood accordingly by those whom the Koran addresses. If God seeks understanding recognition rather than blind obedience, he must encounter receptive people in an aesthetic way. For—at least according to Navid Kermani's thesis informed by his analytical view of Islamic tradition—religious recognition in Islam is conveyed aesthetically as the thrilling, goose bump-inducing hearing of a language described as beautiful, i.e. as an experience of beauty. Kermani is therefore concerned with appreciating the power of aesthetics on a religious level. He views this mystical insight as being entirely in line with the more recent Western aesthetics since Hegel. In almost all philosophical theories of art in the modern tradition, aesthetic experience is about truth. Indeed, contrary to Kant, aesthetic experience need not be about enjoyment or disinterested pleasure. It may simply be about discovering the truth, whatever the cost. As exciting and promising as Kermani's attempt to ground the belief in revelation in aesthesis and to understand the knowledge of God as a perception of the heart may be, this approach raises the question of how to deal with the sensory experiences of pain and the absence of God in the world. The abysses of suffering in our world —especially with this kind of aesthetic approach to the belief in revelation — compel us to ask how experiences of suffering and salvation, of horror and the beauty of God can be reconciled.

=== Der Schrecken Gottes: Attar, Hiob und die metaphysische Revolte (postdoctoral thesis 2005) ===
It is precisely this question that Kermani addresses in his postdoctoral thesis Der Schrecken Gottes: Attar, Hiob und die metaphysische Revolte (The Terror of God: Attar, Job and the Metaphysical Revolt). In this book, Kermani takes up the basic idea of practical-authentic theodicy, which consists in demanding God's justice against the injustice of the world, that is, in Kantian terms, postulating the reality of God and thus God's authentic self-justification without attributing to God the wish to achieve this doctrinally himself. This postulate necessarily includes protest against suffering, which is expressed in quarreling with God and accusing God. Even though wrestling with God is largely frowned upon in Islamic orthodoxy, as it is in Christian orthodoxy, the Islamic mystical literature cited by Kermani, as well as the Book of Job, reveal ways of wrestling with God that are nourished by devotion to God and can accompany the indispensable, postulative discourse on God. For Kermani, the most significant testimony to this wrestling is The Book of Suffering by the Persian mystical poet Attar (1145–1221), a text that shows how in the Islamic tradition it is possible to argue and quarrel with God.

From the perspective of the fools whom Attar references, God appears both as the persecutor and tormentor of humankind and yet also as its last hope. On the one hand, God remains responsible as the creator of the world and is thus also the ultimate cause of suffering—at least in the sense that his creation of the world made suffering possible in the first place. On the other hand, there are situations in which no finite power can save or help human beings. For by definition, only God is the reality that can save us even in death—if he exists. But how can I ask for help from the very one who made my misery possible in the first place? Kermani sees no way to rationally justify this question. Rather, he describes those voices that do not want to abandon God even in misery. The fools he cites do not simply lament the terror of God. Instead, they remind God of the promises he once made in creation. They insist on God's faithfulness, which God describes and promises in His self-revelation. The fools are therefore not blind to reality. On the contrary, they consider all the questions about the reality of a loving God that every human being experiences on a daily basis. Their adherence to God does not dull their senses or take away the horror of suffering. But it enables them to face the abysses and terror of reality without, however, giving up hope. Belief in God thus operates as an imposition that can drive one to madness. At the same time, however, it appears as the last possibility for putting up with the world in its ambiguity without losing one's own humanity.

=== Wonder Beyond Belief: On Christianity (2018) ===
While Kermani's scholarly theses deal with Islamic tradition, he has since repeatedly turned his attention to Christianity. Particularly prominent and noteworthy in this regard is his Wonder Beyond Belief: On Christianity published in German in 2015 and in English in 2018. The book approaches Christianity in an aesthetic way—through thoughtful reflections on images by various Christian artists, especially from the Italian Baroque period. These self-contained, deeply researched art-historical essays open up exciting perspectives on central characteristics of Christianity and have met with great resonance. In a highly original approach to the cross, Kermani's characteristic linking of beauty and the terror of God can be found once again. Attracted by the aesthetic power of artist and sculptor Karl Schlamminger's cross sculpture, but also by the beauty and grace with which the cross is carried in Botticelli's depictions, Kermani is moved by the aesthetic power of the cross. However, he also recognizes the cross as a believer's approach to suffering itself—for example, when he compares the thieves on the cross to mercenaries who crucify agitators in Syria or Iraq today. Indeed, Kermani associates the cross with human victims throughout history, citing Jesus's lamenting accusation on the cross. He insists on not separating Jesus from ourselves and on discovering our own suffering in Jesus's suffering.

Two somewhat longer chapters in the book deviate slightly from the rest of the text because they do not contain any image analysis but instead focus on individual persons. Particularly noteworthy is the last part of the second chapter, which movingly describes the life story and the mission of Father Paolo Dall'Oglio, who for Kermani embodies everything he admires about Christianity: a form of unconditional love for one's neighbor that, especially in monks and nuns, goes beyond what a person can achieve without God. Kermani vividly describes the great love for Islam that characterizes Father Paolo and the Mar Musa monastery Paolo founded in Syria, which Kermani characterizes as a place of coexistence between religions. For Father Paolo, his conversion to Islam was not an act of benevolence but rather one that enriched his own life and faith; he is a monk, a disciple of Jesus, who is in love with Islam – as Kermani puts it.

Kermani clearly sees this as a model for interfaith dialogue and Christian-Muslim rapprochement. By kidnapping the priest Father Paolo, who loves Islam like no other, the Islamic State has attempted to force Christians to fear Islam as an enemy. Kermani counters this attempt at intimidation with a declaration of his own love for Christianity, responding to Father Paolo and demonstrating how love can be used to counter violence. Kermani also repeatedly explains in his book how he has learned from Christianity—for example, in terms of remembering the suffering and death of others. This aspect of the book has become known to a wider public through Kermani's repeated tributes to Father Paolo and his order, for example in Kermani's highly acclaimed German Publishers Association Peace Prize speech.

=== Everyone, Wherever You Are, Come One Step Closer (2022) ===
In 2022, Kermani published his most successful religion-related book to date, with the programmatic title: Everyone, Wherever You Are, Come One Step Closer. It is written as an address to Kermani's daughter. Responding to her questions about God and religion, the book offers an excellent introduction to faith for young people. While Kermani mainly focuses on Islam and explains many of the specifics of this religion, his mystical approach to religion offers a great deal of relatable content for people of all faiths. The book's detailed analysis of modern physics as a form of contemporary adaptation of traditional beliefs is striking, and the book succeeds in offering a complex and thoroughly thought-out understanding of religion in a humorous and accessible style.

== Bibliography (selection) ==
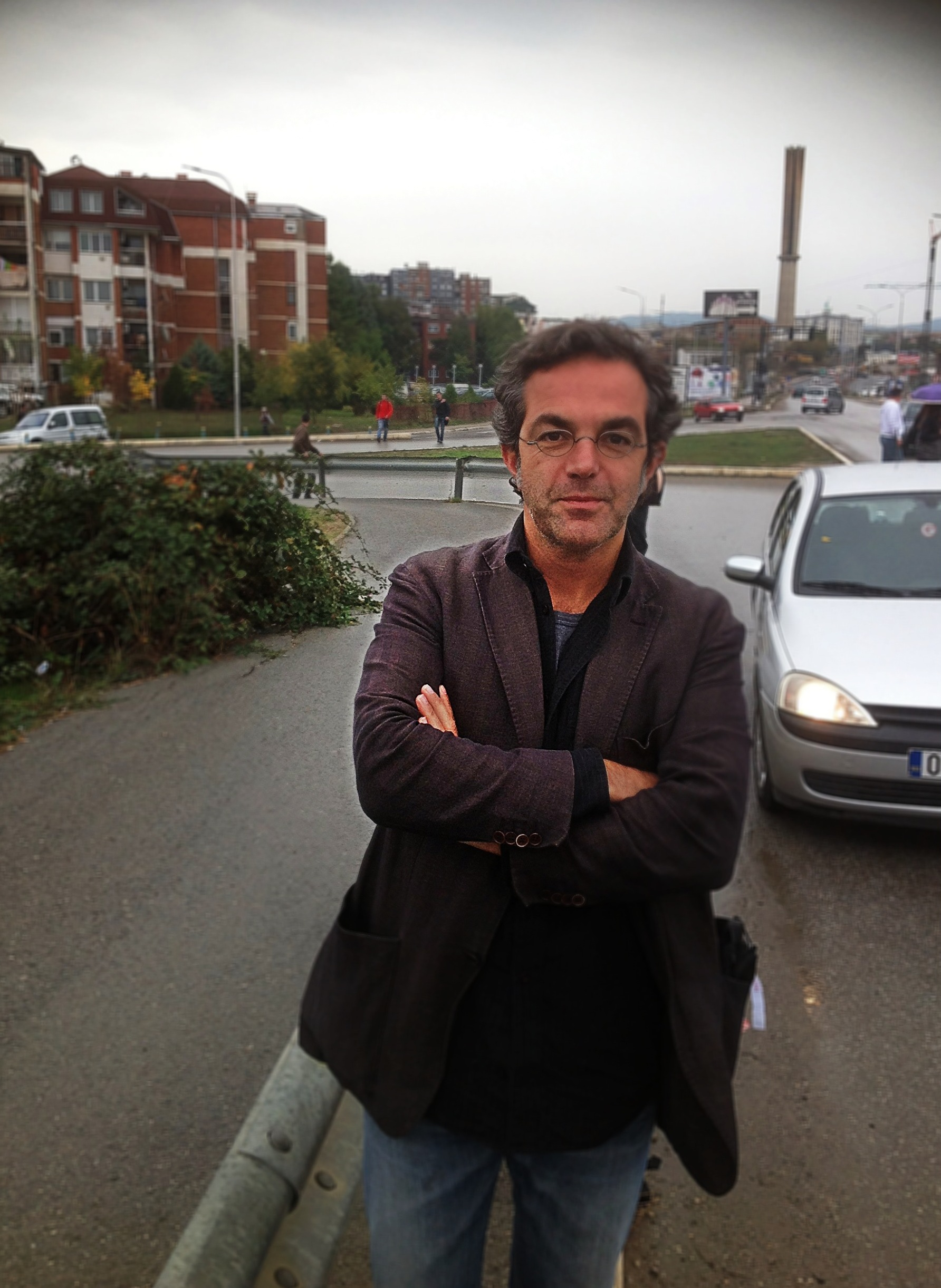
Navid Kermani in Priština (2013)

- Offenbarung als Kommunikation: Das Konzept wahy in Nasr Hamid Abu Zaids Mafhum an-nass, Frankfurt et al. 1996 (Peter Lang).
- Kermani, Navid (2000). Gott ist schön (in German). C.H.Beck. ISBN 978-3-406-46738-7.
- Nasr Hamid Abu Zaid: Ein Leben mit dem Islam, Freiburg 1999: Herder.
- Iran: Die Revolution der Kinder, Munich 2000: C. H. Beck.
- Dynamit des Geistes: Martyrium, Islam und Nihilismus, Göttingen 2002: Wallstein.
- Das Buch der von Neil Young Getöteten, Zurich 2002: Ammann: Cologne 2004; Kiepenheuer; Berlin 2013: Suhrkamp.
- Schöner Neuer Orient: Berichte von Städten und Kriegen, Munich 2003: C. H. Beck; Munich 2007: dtv.
- Toleranz: Drei Lesarten zu Lessings Märchen vom Ring im Jahre 2003 (with Angelika Overath and Robert Schindel), Göttingen 2003: Wallstein.
- Vierzig Leben, Zurich 2004: Ammann.
- Du sollst, Zurich 2005: Ammann.
- Der Schrecken Gottes Munich 2005: C. H. Beck.
- Strategie der Eskalation: Der Nahe Osten und die Politik des Westens, Göttingen 2005: Wallstein.
- Nach Europa, Zurich 2006: Ammann.
- Ayda, Bär und Hase (children's book), Vienna 2006: Picus.
- Mehdi Bazargan, Und Jesus ist sein Prophet: Der Koran und die Christen, German trans. from the Persian by Markus Gerhold, ed. and with an introduction by Navid Kermani, Munich 2006: C. H. Beck.
- Kurzmitteilung, Zurich 2007: Ammann.
- Wer ist Wir? Deutschland und seine Muslime, Munich 2009: C. H. Beck.
- Ausnahmezustände: Reisen in eine beunruhigte Welt, Munich 2013: C. H. Beck.
- Zwischen Koran und Kafka: West-östliche Erkundungen, Munich 2014: C. H. Beck.
- Ungläubiges Staunen: Über das Christentum, Munich 2015: C. H. Beck.
- Sozusagen Paris, Munich 2016: Hanser.
- Einbruch der Wirklichkeit: Auf dem Flüchtlingstreck durch Europa, Munich 2016: C. H. Beck.
- Entlang den Gräben: Eine Reise durch das östliche Europa bis nach Isfahan, Munich 2018: C. H. Beck.
- Morgen ist da: Reden, Munich 2019: C. H. Beck.
- Jeder soll von da, wo er ist, einen Schritt näher kommen: Fragen nach Gott, Munich 2022: Hanser.
- Was jetzt möglich ist: 33 politische Situationen, Munich 2022: C.H. Beck. ISBN 978-3-406-79023-2.
- Das Alphabet bis S. Roman, Munich 2023: Hanser. ISBN 978-3-446-27745-8.
- In die andere Richtung jetzt. Eine Reise durch Ostafrika, Munich 2024: C.H. Beck, ISBN 978-3-406-81969-8.
- with Mehrdad Zaeri (illustration): Zu Hause ist es am schönsten, sagte die linke Hand und hielt sich an der Heizung fest, Berlin 2025: Hanser, ISBN 978-3-446-28260-5.
- Wenn sich unsere Herzen gleich öffnen. Über Politik und Liebe, Munich 2025: C.H. Beck, ISBN 978-3-406-83887-3.
- Sommer 24. Roman. Hanser, Berlin 2026, ISBN 978-3-446-28576-7.
- Köln. E Jeföhl. C.H. Beck, München 2026, ISBN 978-3-406-85095-0.

=== In English translation ===
- Kermani, Navid (2011). The Terror of God: Attar, Job and the Metaphysical Revolt. Translated by Wieland Hoban. Cambridge, UK: Polity. ISBN 978-0-7456-4527-8. OCLC 668946700.
- Kermani, Navid (2015). God is Beautiful: The Aesthetic Experience of the Quran. Translated by Tony Crawford. Cambridge, UK: Polity Press. ISBN 978-0745651675. OCLC 881418248.
- Kermani, Navid (2016). Between Quran and Kafka: West-eastern Affinities. Translated by Tony Crawford. Cambridge, UK: Polity Press. ISBN 978-1-5095-0033-8. OCLC 940342167.
- Kermani, Navid (2017). Upheaval: The Refugee Trek through Europe. Translated by Tony Crawford. Cambridge, UK: Polity Press. ISBN 978-1-5095-1868-5. OCLC 982184554.
- Kermani, Navid (2017). Wonder Beyond Belief: On Christianity. Translated by Tony Crawford (English ed.). Cambridge, UK: Polity Press. ISBN 978-1509514847. (2018 Schlegel-Tieck Prize.)
- Kermani, Navid (2018). State of Emergency: Travels in a Troubled World. Translated by Tony Crawford. Cambridge, UK: Polity. ISBN 978-1-5095-1470-0.
- Kermani, Navid (2019). Love Writ Large. Translated by Alexander Booth. London: Seagull Books. ISBN 978-0-85742-602-4. OCLC 1051682987.
- Kermani, Navid (2020). Along the Trenches: A Journey through Eastern Europe to Isfahan. Translated by Tony Crawford. Cambridge, UK: Polity Press. ISBN 978-1-5095-3557-6. OCLC 1097364913.
- Kermani, Navid (2022). Tomorrow Is Here: Speeches. Translated by Tony Crawford. Cambridge, UK: Polity Press. ISBN 978-1-5095-5056-2. OCLC 1292971292.
- Kermani, Navid (2023). Everyone, Wherever You Are, Come One Step Closer: Questions about God. Translated by Tony Crawford. Cambridge, UK: Polity Press. ISBN 978-1-5095-5628-1. OCLC 1389811523.
- Kermani, Navid (2023). What Is Possible Now: 33 Political Situations. Translated by Tony Crawford. Cambridge, UK: Polity Press. ISBN 978-1-5095-5764-6. OCLC 1378713376.
- Kermani, Navid (2026): In the Other Direction Now. Dispatches from East Africa. Haus Publishing, London 2026, ISBN 978-1-914982-22-4. Translated by Tony Crawford; In die andere Richtung jetzt. Eine Reise durch Ostafrika. C.H. Beck, München 2024, ISBN 978-3-406-81969-8; Rezension von Wolfram Schütte.

== Awards, distinctions and memberships ==
- 2000: Ernst Bloch Promotional Award for his book Gott ist schön. Das ästhetische Erleben des Koran [Godi s Beautiful. The Aesthetic Experience of the Koran] (1999)
- 2003: Annual Prize of the Helga-und-Edzard-Reuter-Foundation
- 2004: Schwarzkopf-Europe-Prize of the Foundation Schwarzkopf-Stiftung Junges Europa
- 2007: Member of the Deutsche Akademie für Sprache und Dichtung
- 2008: Fellowship of the Villa Massimo in Rom
- 2009: Hessian Cultural Prize
- 2011: Nomination of the novel Dein Name for the German Book Prize
- 2011: Buber-Rosenzweig-Medal
- 2011: Hannah Arendt Prize; Award Presentation Speech: Marie Luise Knott
- 2012: Kleist Prize for the novel Dein Name (2011)
- 2012: Honorary Prize of the City of Cologne Culture Prize Kölner Kulturpreises
- 2012: Cicero Prize for public speaking
- 2014: Gerty Spies Literature Prize
- 2014: Prize of the Association of German Institutions of Dialogue des BDDI
- 2014: Joseph Breitbach Prize
- 2015: North Rhine-Westphalian Academy of Sciences, Humanities and the Arts, Member
- 2015: Peace Prize of the German Publishers' Association
- 2015: Jan Michalski Prize for Literature finalist for Zwischen Koran und Kafka: West-östliche Erkundungen
- 2016: Marion Dönhoff Prize for International Understanding and Reconciliation
- 2017: Hermann Sinsheimer Prize of the City of Freinsheim
- 2017: ECF Princess Margriet Award for Culture of the European Cultural Foundation
- 2017: Civic Engagement Award of the German Newspaper Publishers, Award Presentation Speech: Wolf Lepenies
- 2017: State Prize of the Federal State North Rhine-Westphalia, Award Presentation Speech: Wolfgang Schäuble
- 2018: Samuel Bogumil Linde Prize; Award Presentation Speech: Joachim Gauck
- 2020: Friedrich-Hölderlin-Preis
- 2021: Appointed Honorary Member of the Board of Trustees of the WDR Symphony Orchestra Cologne
- 2021: Austrian Book Publishers Award for Tolerance in Thought and Action
- 2022: Honorary Degree of the Philosophy Department of the University of Siegen
- 2023: Member of the authors association PEN Berlin
- 2023: Winfried Prize of the City of Fulda
- 2023: Hans Ehrenberg Prize
- 2024: Thomas Mann Prize
- 2026: Bundesverdienstkreuz 1. Klasse

== Other activities ==
- Avicenna-Studienwerk, member of the board of trustees
- Goethe Institute, Member of the Committee for the Goethe Medal
- Green Helmets, member of the board of trustees

== Controversy ==
In 2009, the German state of Hesse decided to award its 45,000 euro Hessian Cultural Prize in July 2009 jointly to a Jew, a Muslim, a Catholic and a Lutheran to honour those involved in interfaith dialogue. There was controversy over Kermani's nomination as one of the three winners because of an essay in which Kermani wrote about his feelings about seeing a painting of the crucifixion by the seventeenth-century Italian painter Guido Reni. The issue was ultimately resolved, and Cardinal Karl Lehmann, Peter Steinacker, Kermani and Salomon Korn jointly received the prize on 26 November 2009. Kermani donated his share of the award to a Christian priest.

== Personal life ==
Kermani holds German and Iranian citizenship. He has two children with the Islam scholar Katajun Amirpur, from whom he was divorced in 2020. He lives in Cologne.
