= Christine Wunnicke =

German novelist and translator (born 1966)

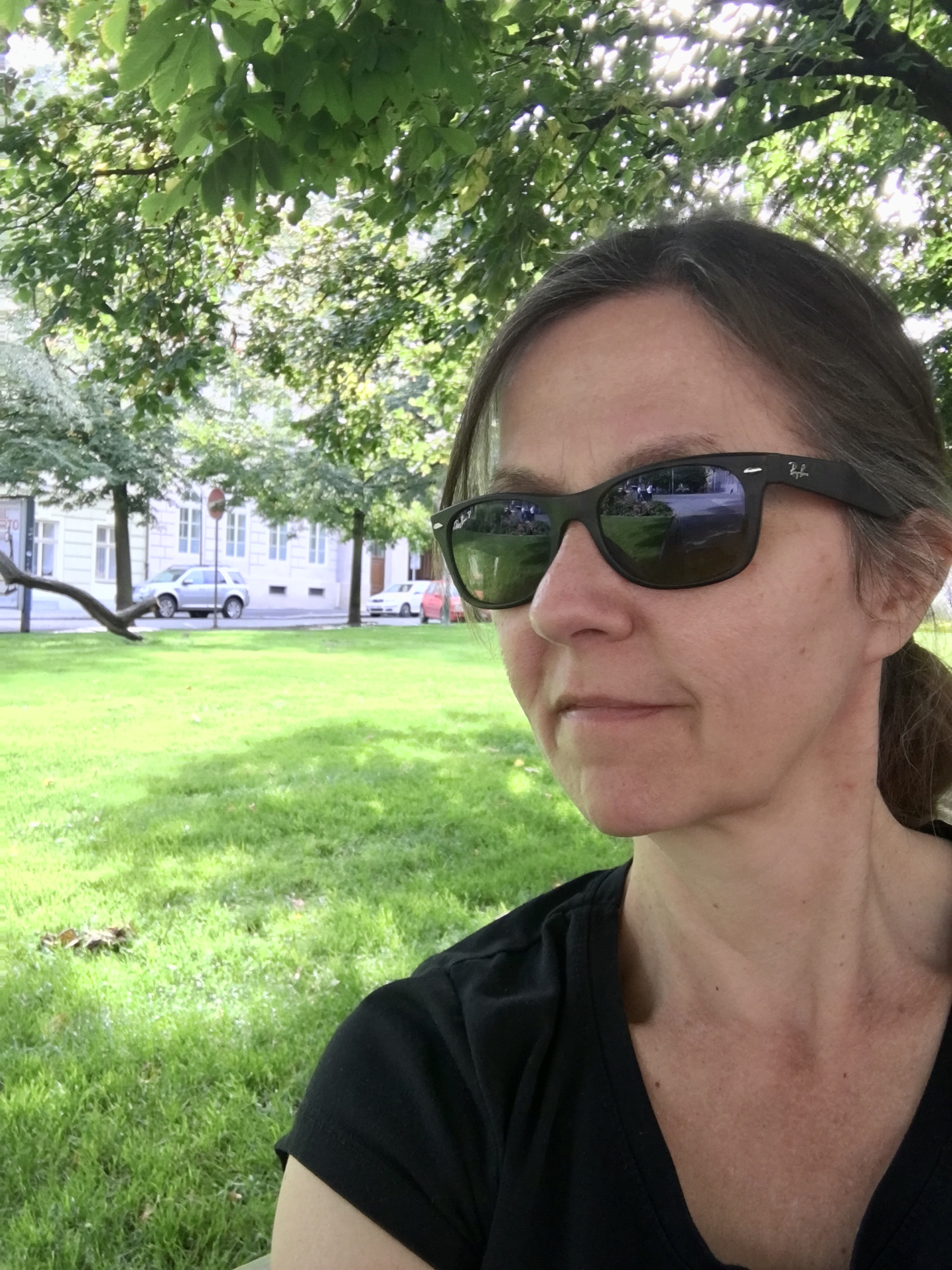
- Wunnicke in 2019
- Born: 1966 (age 59–60); Munich, West Germany
- Occupations: Writer, translator
- Writing career
- Language: German
- Period: 1991–present
- Genre: Historical fiction
- Notable works: Der Fuchs und Dr. Shimamura (2015); Die Dame mit der bemalten Hand (2020)
- Notable awards: Georg Büchner Prize (2026); Jean Paul Prize (2025); Wilhelm Raabe Literature Prize (2020)

Christine Wunnicke (born 1966) is a German novelist and translator. She has published several historical novels since the late 1990s, which often feature unlikely meetings of real historical figures, as well as radio plays, a biography and translations from Italian and English into German. She has received some of German literature's most prestigious awards for her work, including the Wilhelm Raabe Literature Prize in 2020 and the Georg Büchner Prize in 2026.

== Life and career ==
Wunnicke was born in Munich in 1966. She has said her enthusiasm for literature and writing began as a four-year-old, after realising that other people could read but she could not. After studying linguistics, Old Germanic studies and psychology, she worked in scientific administration for the Max Planck Society.

Wunnicke is best known for her historical novels, which are generally set in the 17th, 18th or 19th centuries, and feature unlikely meetings of real historical figures. Her novels tend not to be historically accurate but focus more on characters and humour. They are often of novella length and she has described them as "Roman-Haiku" (novel haiku). She rarely appears at literary events or other public appearances, and has said she makes a living from her radio and translation work rather than her novels.

== Writing and themes ==
Wunnicke began writing radio plays in the early 1990s. In 1998, her first historical novel, Fortescues Fabrik (Fortescue's Factory) was published. It was followed in 2000 by another historical novel, Jetlag, and in 2001 by a non-fiction biography of castrato singer Filippo Balatri. In 2006, a modified section of Fortescues Fabrik was re-published as a novella under the title Missouri; it was translated into English by David Miller in 2010.

Her novel Der Fuchs und Dr. Shimamura (The Fox and Dr. Shimamura), about the Japanese neurologist Shimamura Shun’ichi, was published in 2015, and longlisted for the German Book Prize. In 2019 it was translated into English by Philip Boehm. Boehm received 2020 Helen and Kurt Wolff Translator's Prize for the work, awarded for translations from German into English. It received a starred review from Kirkus Reviews, which praised Wunnicke as a "master of the form" for her "delicate prose, arch tone, and mischievous storytelling". Publishers Weekly called it a "clever and rewarding novel of slippery memories tinged with Japanese myths".

Wunnicke's 2017 novel, Katie, is about the relationship between English scientist William Crookes and alleged medium Florence Cook. Like her other works, it has comedic elements, with Cook and other characters seeing a real ghost called Katie. It was selected as a "book of the week" by SWR in March 2017; the review called it a literary masterpiece and praised the authenticity and idiosyncrasy of her characters.

In 2020 she received the Wilhelm Raabe Literature Prize for her novel Die Dame mit der bemalten Hand (The Lady with the Painted Hand). It was also shortlisted for the German Book Prize. The novel is set in the 18th century and is about the fictional meeting of German mathematician Carsten Niebuhr with a Persian astronomer. The novel has been described by a reviewer for Deutschlandfunk Kultur as humorous, with the characters attempting to communicate with each other in Sanskrit, Arabic and German.

In 2019, Wunnicke was awarded the Ernst-Hoferichter-Preis, but she declined it. She was unhappy with the organiser's handling of controversy around a cartoon by fellow recipient Dieter Hanitzsch, which had been criticised as antisemitic.

In 2025, Wunnicke was awarded the Jean Paul Prize for her body of work. In the same year, her novel Wachs (Wax) was shortlisted for the German Book Prize. Wachs is about a fictional relationship between botanical artist Madeleine Basseporte and anatomist Marie Bihéron in 18th century Paris.

In 2026, Wunnicke received the Georg Büchner Prize, one of the most important prizes in German literature, which includes a monetary award of €50,000. She was praised by politician Timon Gremmels for enriching German literature.

== Works ==
=== Novels and other fiction ===
- Fortescues Fabrik. Albrecht Knaus Verlag, Munich 1998. ISBN 3-8135-0094-2.
- Jetlag. Knaus, Munich 2000. ISBN 3-8135-0155-8.
- Die Kunst der Bestimmung. Kindler Verlag, Berlin 2003. ISBN 978-3-463-40450-9.
- Missouri. Männerschwarm Verlag, Hamburg 2006. ISBN 3-935596-44-8. New edition: Albino, Berlin 2020. ISBN 978-3-86300-308-1.
- Serenity. Osburg Verlag, Berlin 2008. ISBN 3-940731-06-4.
- Nagasaki, ca. 1642. Novella. Edition Epoca, Zürich 2010. ISBN 978-3-905513-51-6.
- Selig & Boggs. Die Erfindung von Hollywood. Berenberg Verlag, Berlin 2013. ISBN 978-3-937834-59-7.
- Der Fuchs und Dr. Shimamura. Berenberg, Berlin 2015. ISBN 978-3-937834-76-4.
- Katie. Berenberg, Berlin 2017. ISBN 978-3-946334-13-2.
- Die Dame mit der bemalten Hand. Berenberg, Berlin 2020. ISBN 978-3-946334-76-7.
- Wachs. Berenberg, Berlin 2025. ISBN 978-3-911327-03-9.

=== English translations ===
- Missouri. Translated by David Miller. Arsenal Pulp Press, Vancouver 2010.
- The Fox and Dr. Shimamura. Translated by Philip Boehm. New Directions, New York 2019. ISBN 978-0-8112-2624-0.

=== Biography ===
- Die Nachtigall des Zaren. Das Leben des Kastraten Filippo Balatri. Claassen Verlag, Munich 2001. ISBN 3-546-00248-2.

=== Translations ===
- John Wilmot, 2nd Earl of Rochester: Der beschädigte Wüstling. Männerschwarm Verlag, Hamburg 2005; dtv, Munich 2008.
- Ronald Firbank: Die Blume unter dem Fuße. Männerschwarm Verlag, Hamburg 2008.
- E. M. Forster: "Arthur Snatchfold", Der Antikenflügel, Spielt das denn eine Rolle? and Die Geschichte einer Panik. Short stories. In: E. M. Forster, Das künftige Leben. Männerschwarm Verlag, Hamburg 2009.
- Margherita Costa: Die schöne Frau bedarf der Zügel nicht. Portrait, selection of works and translation by Christine Wunnicke. Bilingual German/Italian edition. Berenberg, Berlin 2023. ISBN 978-3-949203-48-0.

=== Radio plays (selection) ===
- 1993: Die Träume des André Le Nôtre (dir. Otto Düben, SDR)
- 1994: Bozzy's Johnson (dir. Stefan Hilsbecher, SDR)
- 1996: Das Walroß und der Zimmermann (dir. Hans Gerd Krogmann, SDR)
- 1997: Nothschrei eines Magnetisch-Vergifteten (after Friedrich Krauß) (dir., music and co-writer: Stefan Hardt, RB)
- 2000: We are a happy family. Punk in Amerika (dir. Hans Helge Ott, RB/SR), based on the book Please Kill Me: The Uncensored Oral History of Punk by Legs McNeil and Gillian McCain
- 2002: Start me up (dir. Gottfried von Einem, RB)
- 2006: Fleshcrafter (dir. Andrea Getto, NDR)
- 2008: GPS Dream Lover (dir. Holger Rink, RB)
- 2018: Alles Rumi (dir. Ulrich Lampen, RB)
- 2020: Alles Tatami (dir. Ulrich Lampen, RB)

=== Radio features (selection) ===
- 1993: Gott Lullo selbst, unsterblich und erhaben. Die "Lulliade" des Ranieri de' Calzabigi (WDR)
- 1996: Radio Steam Calliope. Ezra Pounds Wege um die Musik (BR)
- 2002: Leben, Tod und Mysterien des fabelhaften Joe Meek (BR)
- 2006: Mountain High, River Deep – Glanz und Elend des Impresarios Phil Spector (BR)
- 2007: Ich ziehe die Freiheit den Brillantenketten vor. Lady Mary Wortley Montagu (SWR)
- 2008: Die unbeugsame Astrea. Über die englische Schriftstellerin Aphra Behn (SWR)
- 2009: Die Welt, als Ohrring getragen. Leben und Anschauungen der Margaret Cavendish, Duchess of Newcastle (SWR)
- 2010: Die Brauerin von Streatham Park. Vom Leben, Lieben und Schreiben der Hester Thrale Piozzi (SWR)
- 2012: Die Geschichte des Derwischs Mirza Abdullah und seiner frommen Frau. Lady Isabel und Sir Richard Burton (SWR)
- 2015: The Ghost Club (dir. Günter Maurer, SWR)
- 2019: Anatom der Welt. Vor 350 Jahren entdeckte der Däne Nicolaus Steno die Evolutionsgeschichte (BR)

== Awards and honours ==
- 1998: Prix Marulić, 3rd place for Nothschrei eines Magnetisch-Vergifteten
- 1999: Kurt Magnus Prize
- 2002: Bayerischer Kunstförderpreis in the literature category, for Die Nachtigall des Zaren
- 2008: Toucan Prize of the city of Munich, for Serenity
- 2016: Franz Hessel Prize, for Der Fuchs und Dr. Shimamura
- 2020: Wilhelm Raabe Literature Prize for Die Dame mit der bemalten Hand
- 2025: Jean Paul Prize
- 2026: Georg Büchner Prize
