= Martin Kessel =

Martin Kessel (14 April 1901 – 14 April 1990) was a German writer. In 1954, he was awarded the Georg Büchner Prize by the Deutsche Akademie für Sprache und Dichtung. He was born in Plauen and died in Berlin. The New York based literary website complete review has labeled Kessel as one of the almost forgotten authors who "has long bobbed near that surface separating recognition from oblivion, threatening several times to sink from sight".

== Writing ==
Mr. Brecher's Fiasco is considered Kessel's masterpiece. The novel which was first published in German in 1932 was praised by the University of Wisconsin Press as "one of the great modern novels about the urban heart of Germany" in "a time of hope and hyperinflation, sexual liberation and repression, industrialization and unemployment, and constant political instability — with the shadow of fascism looming ever larger.

== Awards ==
- Kleist Prize Honorable Mention
- Georg Büchner Prize 1954
- Fontane Prize 1961
- Großer Literaturpreis der Bayerischen Akademie der Schönen Künste 1962
