= Ursula Krechel =

German writer and poet

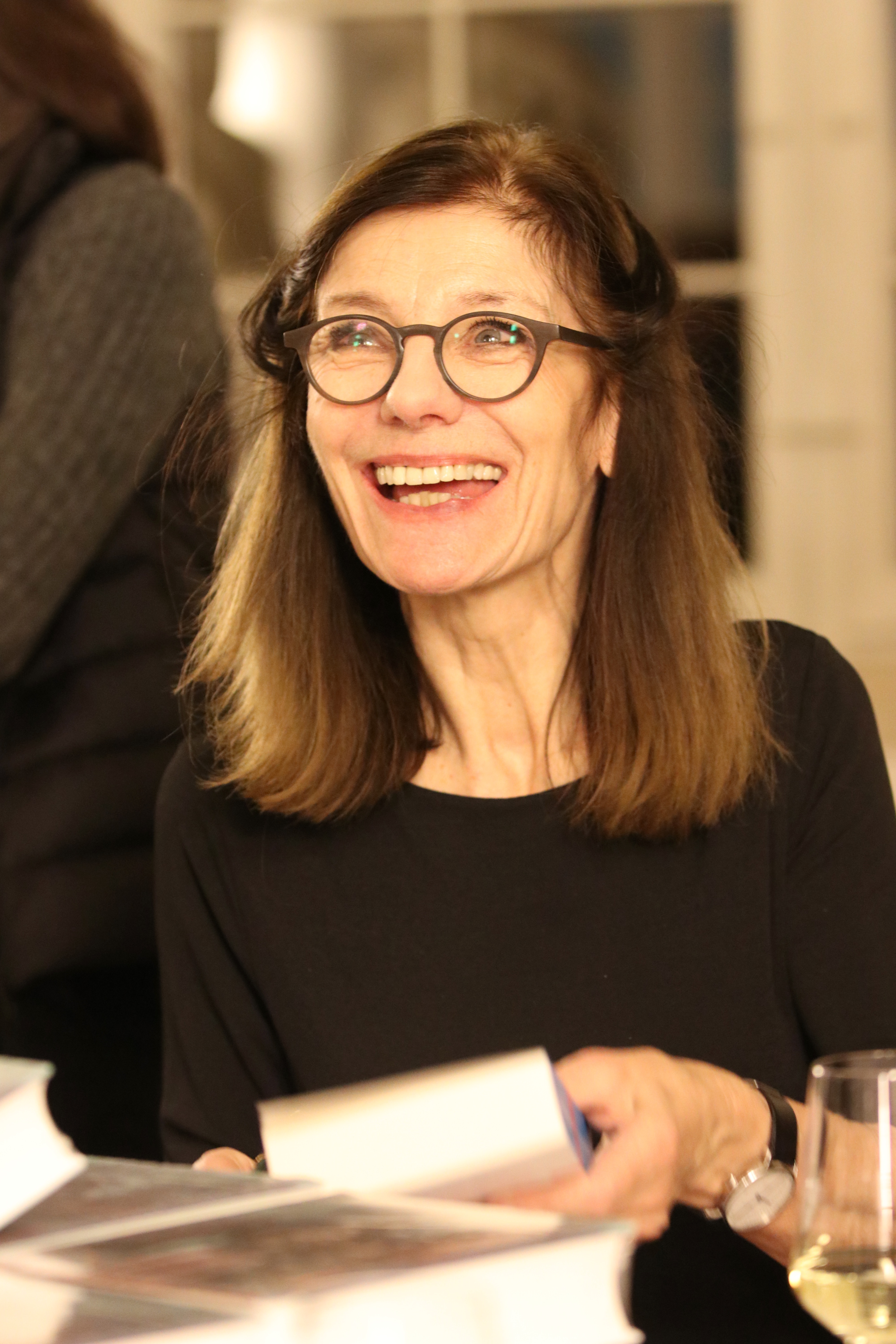
- Krechel in 2019
- Born: 4 December 1947 (age 78); Trier, Germany
- Writing career
- Notable awards: Joseph-Breitbach-Preis; German Book Prize; Jean-Paul-Preis; Georg Büchner Prize

Ursula Krechel (born 4 December 1947) is a German writer and poet.

== Biography ==
Krechel was born on 4 December 1947, in Trier. From 1966 to 1972, she studied German studies, theatre, and art history at the University of Cologne. From 1969 to 1972, she worked as a dramaturge in Dortmund. After 1978, she lived in Frankfurt on Main for many years and since 2000 has lived and worked in Berlin as a writer, focusing on Lyric poetry, but also writing prose, drama, and radio drama.

In 2012 Krechel won the German Book Prize for her hybrid novel Landgericht, subsequently published as an audiobook in 2014. German public service broadcaster ZDF aired a film version in 2017.

Ursula Krechel is a member of Akademie der Künste (Academy of Arts) and the German Academy for Language and Literature. The Akademie der Künste holds the Ursula Krechel archive, which includes her publications, documents, manuscripts and correspondence. She is Vice-President of the Academy of Sciences and Literature, Mainz. In 2020, Krechel became the Honorary President of the PEN Centre Germany.

In 2025 she won the prestigious German literature award Georg Büchner Prize.

== Works ==
List obtained from Literatur Port.

=== Poetry ===
- Umsturz. Darmstadt: Luchterhand Literaturverlag. 1977.
- Nach Mainz!. Darmstadt: Luchterhand Literaturverlag. 1977.
- Verwundbar wie in den besten Zeiten. Darmstadt: Luchterhand Literaturverlag. 1979. ISBN 978-3-630-86491-4.
- Rohschnitt. Darmstadt: Luchterhand Literaturverlag. 1983. ISBN 978-3-472-86572-8.
- Vom Feuer lernen. Darmstadt: Luchterhand Literaturverlag. 1989. ISBN 978-3-630-86620-8.
- Kakaoblau. Salzburg: Residenz. 1989. ISBN 978-3-7017-0574-0.
- Technik des Erwachens. Frankfurt: Suhrkamp. 1992. ISBN 978-3-518-40431-7.
- Äußerst innen. Etchings by Irmgard Flemming. Frankfurt: Edition Flemming. 1993.
- Ungezürnt. Frankfurt: Suhrkamp. 1997. ISBN 978-3-518-39282-9.
- Landläufiges Wunder. Frankfurt: Suhrkamp. 1995. ISBN 978-3-518-40715-8.
- Verbeugungen vor der Luft. Salzburg: Residenz. 1999. ISBN 978-3-7017-1165-9.
- Mein Hallo dein Ohr. Witzwort: Quetsche. 2002. p. 47. ISBN 978-3-925899-69-0.
- Stimmen aus dem harten Kern. Vienna: Jung und Jung Verlag. 2005. ISBN 978-3-902144-98-0.
- Mittelwärts. Springe, Germany: Zu Klampen!. 2006. p. 47. ISBN 978-3-933156-86-0.
- Jäh erhellte Dunkelheit. Vienna: Jung und Jung Verlag. 2010. ISBN 978-3-902497-67-3.

=== Novels and stories ===
- Zweite Natur. Darmstadt: Luchterhand Literaturverlag. 1981. ISBN 978-3-472-86529-2.
- Die Freunde des Wetterleuchtens. Frankfurt: Luchterhand Literaturverlag. 1990. ISBN 978-3-630-86741-0.
- Sizilianer des Gefühls. Frankfurt: Suhrkamp. 1993. ISBN 978-3-518-40510-9.
- Der Übergriff. Salzburg: Jung und Jung Verlag. 2001. ISBN 978-3-902144-16-4.
- Shanghai fern von wo. Vienna: Jung und Jung Verlag. 2008. ISBN 978-3-902497-44-4.
- Landgericht. Vienna: Jung und Jung Verlag. 2012. ISBN 978-3-99027-024-0.
- Geisterbahn. Vienna: Jung und Jung Verlag. 2018. ISBN 978-3-99027-219-0.
- Sehr geehrte Frau Ministerin. Stuttgart: Klett-Cotta Verlag. 2025. ISBN 978-3-608-96653-4.

=== Essays and criticism ===
- Information und Wertung (PhD). Cologne: University of Cologne. 1972.
- Selbsterfahrung und Fremdbestimmung. Darmstadt: Luchterhand Literaturverlag. 1976. ISBN 978-3-472-61205-6.
- Mit dem Körper des Vaters spielen. Frankfurt: Suhrkamp. 1992. p. 260. ISBN 978-3-518-11716-3.
- In Zukunft schreiben. Salzburg: Jung und Jung. 2010. ISBN 978-3-902144-66-9.
- Stark und leise. Pionierinnen. Salzburg: Jung und Jung. 2015. ISBN 978-3-99027-071-4.
- Gehen. Träumen. Sehen. Unter Bäumen. Salzburg: Jung und Jung. 2022. ISBN 978-3-99027-261-9.

=== Plays ===
- Erika. Frankfurt: Verlag der Autoren. 1973.
- Aus der Sonne. Frankfurt: Verlag der Autoren. 1985.
- Tribunal im askanischen Hof. Berlin: Literaturhaus. 1989. ISBN 978-3-926433-02-2.
- Sitzen Bleiben Gehen. Frankfurt: Verlag der Autoren. 1990.
- Ich glaub, mich tritt ein Meerschwein. Frankfurt: Verlag der Autoren. 1996.
- Liebes Stück. Frankfurt: Verlag der Autoren. 2003.

== Awards ==
- 1980 Arbeitsstipendium for Berlin artists
- 1994 Internationaler Eifel-Literatur-Preis
- 1994 Martha-Saalfeld-Förderpreis
- 1997 Elisabeth Langgässer Literature Prize
- 2006 Calwer Hermann-Hesse-Stipend
- 2008 Rheingau Literatur Preis for Shanghai fern von wo
- 2009 Jeanette Schocken Preis – Bremerhavener Bürgerpreis für Literatur
- 2009 Deutscher Kritikerpreis
- 2009 Joseph-Breitbach-Preis
- 2009 Kunstpreis Rheinland-Pfalz
- 2012 Wiesbaden Poetry Prize Orphil
- 2012 German Book Prize
- 2019 Jean-Paul-Preis
- 2025 Georg Büchner Prize
