= Petra Morsbach =

German author

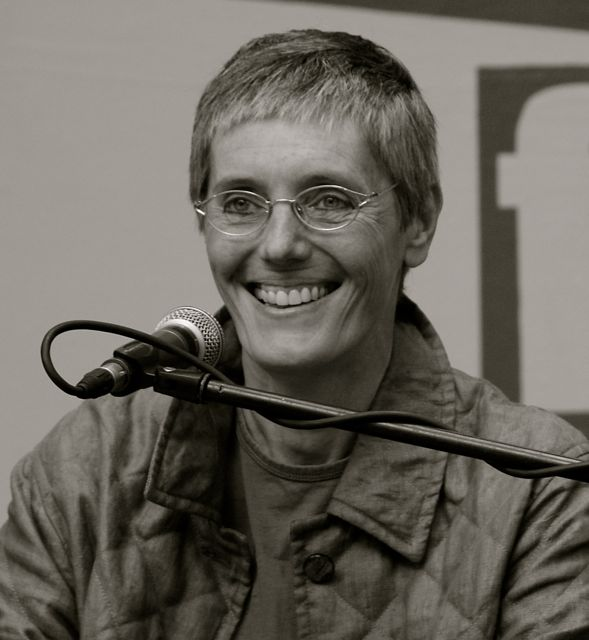
- Born: 1 June 1956 (age 70)
- Occupation: Author
- Writing career
- Notable awards: Jean-Paul-Preis; Wilhelm Raabe Literature Prize

Petra Morsbach (born 1 June 1956) is a German author.

== Life and career ==
Morsbach was born in Zurich, but grew up in Germany. She studied at LMU Munich and Leningrad Theater Academy.

Morsbach's first novel, Plötzlich ist es Abend (Suddenly it's Evening), was published in 1995 and follows the life of a Russian woman whose family was prosecuted by Joseph Stalin.

Opernroman, her second novel, was published in 1998 and is based on Morsbach's experience working in theatre for a decade. It is set in the fictional town of Neustadt am Rhein and centers around the local opera company throughout a season.

Her novel Gottesdiener (God's Servant) was published in 2004 and follows the life of an elderly Catholic priest.

She won the Jean-Paul-Preis with her 2013 book, Dichterliebe which is centered around a poet who is going through an existential crisis.

Her novel, Justizpalast (Palace of Justice) was published in 2017 and won the Wilhelm Raabe Literature Prize. The novel is a biography of a fictional judge called Thirza Zorniger. Morsbach spent nine years researching the justice system for the book.

Andreas Dorschel has praised the precise and penetrating character of Morsbach′s language: "She has found clear, direct expression for the most difficult things."

== Bibliography ==
- Morsbach, Petra (1997). Plötzlich ist es Abend : Roman (in German). [S.l.]: Goldmann. ISBN 978-3-442-72114-6. OCLC 1200562154.
- —— (2000). Opernroman. [Frankfurt am Main?]: Btb. ISBN 978-3-442-72484-0. OCLC 1330614709.
- —— (2004). Gottesdiener : Roman (in German). Frankfurt am Main: Eichborn. ISBN 3-8218-0893-4. OCLC 54610889.
- —— (2013). Dichterliebe Roman (in German). München. ISBN 978-3-8135-0372-2. OCLC 829410362.
- Morsbach, Petra (2000). Opernroman. [Frankfurt am Main?]: Btb. ISBN 978-3-442-72484-0. OCLC 1330614709.
- —— (2006). Warum Fräulein Laura freundlich war : über die Wahrheit des Erzählens (in German). München: Piper. ISBN 3-492-04837-4. OCLC 71200293.
- —— (2008). Der Cembalospieler : Roman (in German). München: Piper. ISBN 978-3-492-04838-5. OCLC 251302828.
- —— (2017). Justizpalast Roman (in Basque). München: Albrecht Knaus Verlag. ISBN 978-3-8135-0373-9. OCLC 984751445.
- —— (2020). Der Elefant im Zimmer über Machtmissbrauch und Widerstand : Essay (in German). München. ISBN 978-3-328-60074-9. OCLC 1196263550.

=== Dissertation ===
- Isaak Babel' auf der sowjetischen Buehne (in German). Bern: Peter Lang International Academic Publishers. 1983. ISBN 978-3-87690-258-6. OCLC 1125725247.
