= Jean Paul Prize =

German literary award

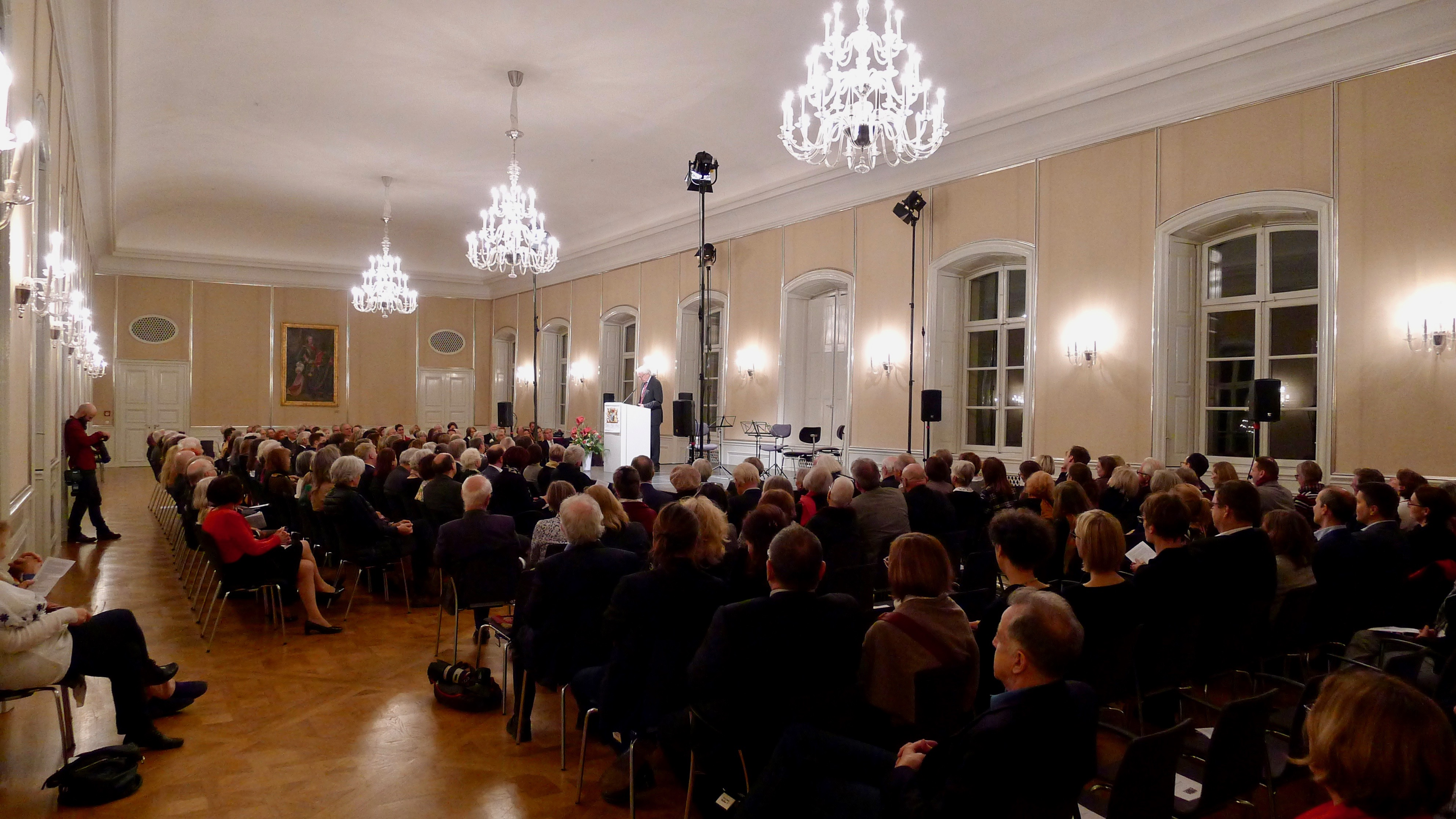
Award ceremony in Munich 2019

Jean Paul Prize (German: Jean-Paul-Preis) is a Bavarian literary prize, awarded bi-annually by the Free State of Bavaria. It is named in honour of the German Romantic writer Jean Paul. The prize money is €20,000.

== Recipients ==
- 1983 Hans Egon Holthusen
- 1985 Friedrich Dürrenmatt
- 1987 Botho Strauß
- 1989 Horst Bienek
- 1991 Hermann Lenz
- 1993 Gertrud Fussenegger
- 1995 Siegfried Lenz
- 1997 Günter de Bruyn
- 1999 Herbert Rosendorfer
- 2001 Gerhard Polt
- 2003 Thomas Hürlimann
- 2005 Sarah Kirsch
- 2007 Uwe Dick
- 2009 Eckhard Henscheid
- 2011 Brigitte Kronauer
- 2013 Petra Morsbach
- 2015 Gerhard Roth
- 2017 Alexander Kluge
- 2019 Ursula Krechel
- 2021 Barbara Honigmann
- 2023 Nico Bleutge
- 2025 Christine Wunnicke
