= Großer Literaturpreis der Bayerischen Akademie der Schönen Künste =

German literary award

Großer Literaturpreis der Bayerischen Akademie der Schönen Künste (in English: Literature Award of the Bavarian Academy of the Fine Arts) was a Bavarian literary prize by the Bayerische Akademie der Schönen Künste. In 2010, it merged with the Thomas Mann Prize.

== Winners ==
- 1950 Friedrich Georg Jünger (Literaturpreis)
- 1951 Günter Eich
- 1953 Marieluise Fleißer
- 1955 Gerd Gaiser und Martha Saalfeld
- 1957 Alfred Döblin
- 1959 Agnes Miegel
- 1960 Otto Flake
- 1961 Ilse Aichinger und Joachim Maass
- 1962 Martin Kessel
- 1963 Horst Lange
- 1964 Heimito von Doderer
- 1965 Wolfgang Koeppen
- 1966 Werner Kraft
- 1967 Franz Tumler
- 1968 Elisabeth Schnack
- 1969 Elias Canetti
- 1970 Hans Paeschke and Rudolf Hartung
- 1971 Manès Sperber
- 1972 Jean Améry
- 1973 Reiner Kunze
- 1974 Gershom Scholem
- 1975 Alfred Andersch
- 1976 Hans Wollschläger
- 1977 Dolf Sternberger
- 1978 Günther Anders
- 1980 Jürgen Becker
- 1981 Botho Strauß
- 1982 Wolfgang Hildesheimer
- 1983 Tankred Dorst
- 1984 Rose Ausländer
- 1985 Karl Krolow
- 1986 Hans Werner Richter (for the first time Großer Literaturpreis)
- 1987 Hans Magnus Enzensberger
- 1988 Hilde Spiel
- 1989 Dieter Kühn
- 1990 Martin Walser
- 1991 Ilse Aichinger
- 1992 Christoph Ransmayr
- 1993 Günter de Bruyn
- 1994 Günter Grass
- 1995 Walter Helmut Fritz
- 1996 Friederike Mayröcker
- 1997 Paul Wühr
- 1998 Wilhelm Genazino
- 1999 Peter Kurzeck
- 2000 Anne Duden
- 2001 Uwe Timm
- 2002 Urs Widmer
- 2003 Ror Wolf
- 2004 Michael Krüger
- 2005 Karl Heinz Bohrer
- 2006 Martin Mosebach
- 2007 Hans Joachim Schädlich
- 2008 Peter Handke (Award renamed to Thomas-Mann-Preis)
