= Hoffmann von Fallersleben Prize =

German literary award

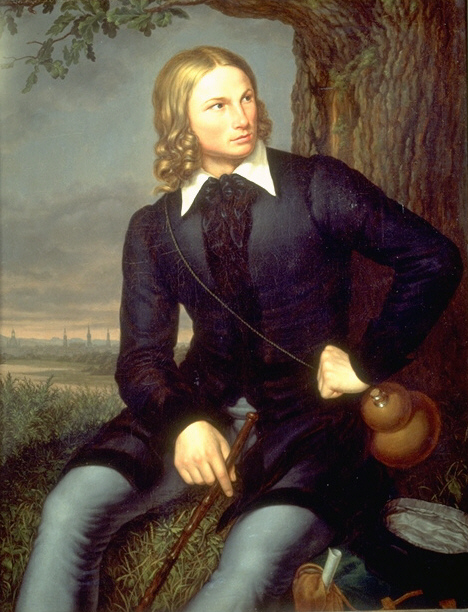
August Heinrich Hoffmann von Fallersleben

The Hoffmann von Fallersleben Prize (German: Hoffmann-von-Fallersleben-Preis für zeitkritische Literatur) is an international literary award, awarded by the Hoffmann von Fallersleben Society (German: Hoffmann-von-Fallersleben-Gesellschaft) in memory of poet August Heinrich Hoffmann von Fallersleben, to authors "whose literary, historical or journalistic work demonstrates independent thinking or encourages others to think independently, in the spirit of Hoffmann von Fallersleben".

== Winners ==
- 2000 Peter Rühmkorf
- 2002 Timothy Garton Ash
- 2004 Hans Joachim Schädlich
- 2006 Walter Kempowski
- 2008 Günter de Bruyn
- 2010 Herta Müller
- 2012 Karl Schlögel
- 2014 Juli Zeh
- 2016 Gerhard Roth
- 2018 Dieter Grimm
