= Lars Gustafsson =

Swedish poet, novelist, and scholar (1936–2016)

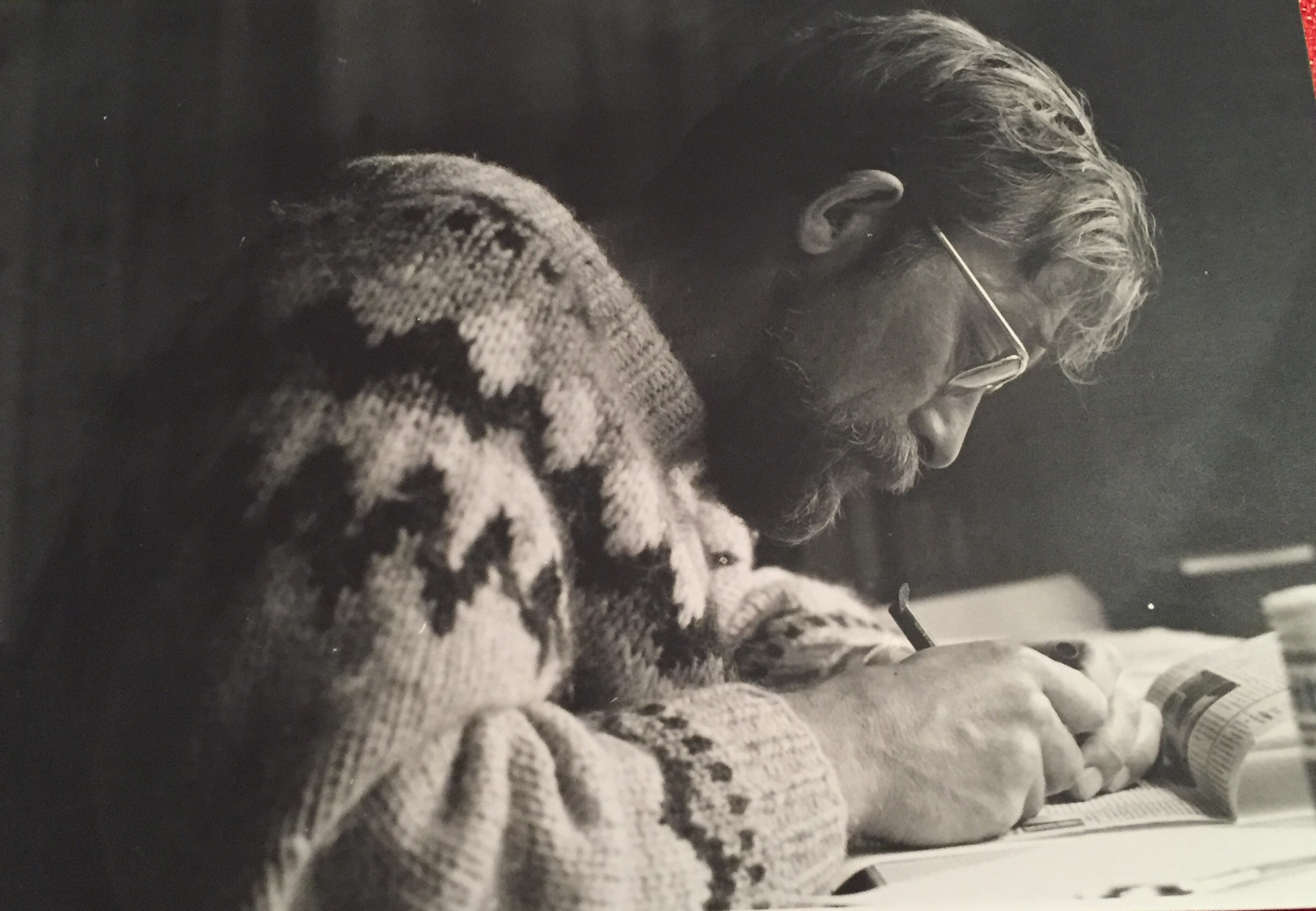
- Lars Gustafsson writing in his study, circa 1970.
- Born: 17 May 1936; Västerås, Sweden
- Died: 3 April 2016 (aged 79); Stockholm, Sweden
- Occupation: Writer

Lars Erik Einar Gustafsson (17 May 1936 – 2 April 2016) was a Swedish poet, novelist, philosopher, and scholar. A prolific and internationally recognized writer, he received numerous literary awards over a career spanning six decades, including the Bellman Prize (1990), the Guggenheim Fellowship (1994), the Gerard Bonniers pris (2006), the Goethe Medal (2009), the Swedish Academy Nordic Prize (2014), the Thomas Mann Prize (2015), the International Nonino Prize (2016), and the Zbigniew Herbert International Literary Award (2016).

== Life and career ==
Gustafsson was born in Västerås, completed his secondary education at the Västerås Gymnasium and continued to Uppsala University, where he studied literature, aesthetics, sociology and philosophy. In 1960, he received a licentiate degree in philosophy. In 1978, he was awarded a PhD in theoretical philosophy with a dissertation on speech and literature. He later served for four years on the university's board of regents (1994–1998).

Already by 1960, Gustafsson was publishing novels and poetry regularly. In addition to his literary work, he was editor-in-chief of Bonniers Litterära Magasin (BLM), Sweden's leading literary journal, from 1962 to 1972. Under his editorship, BLM became a vital forum for the intersection of literary criticism, philosophy, and intellectual debate, bridging Swedish letters with international literary and academic currents. His tenure at the magazine was widely regarded as transformative, combining rigorous literary criticism with questioning and exploratory approaches to science and ideas. He soon established international contacts, notably with the German authors in Group 47. In 1972, through a DAAD fellowship he came to West Berlin, where he lived for two years. During this period, he also traveled extensively, among other places to Australia, Singapore, Japan, Israel, and the United States. Throughout his career, he attended and participated in many international academic and cultural events. John Updike described Gustafsson as "the enviably ideal conferee, a red‑bearded fish never out of water, loving books, ideas, and discourse equally, and everywhere adept."

Having been invited to visit the University of Texas at Austin by its Germanic Studies department in 1972 and again in 1974, and because Austin was his wife's hometown he moved there in 1983, where he served at first as adjunct professor in Germanic Studies, later as professor, then Distinguished Professor, in the Plan II Honors program, teaching philosophy and creative writing. He returned to Sweden in 2003 while continuing to hold a research professorship at the university; in 2006, he retired. He lived in Stockholm, spending summers in Västmanland. He died at the age of 79 on 3 April 2016.

Gustafsson was married three times: in 1961 to Madeleine Gustafsson (two children); in 1982 to Alexandra Chasnoff (two children); in 2005 to Agneta Blomqvist. In 1981 Gustafsson converted to Judaism.

In May 2009, Lars Gustafsson declared that he would vote for the Pirate Party in the upcoming elections for the European Parliament. However, in August 2010 he left the Pirate Party in protest of its cooperation with the WikiLeaks portal, which he accused of delivering death lists for the Taliban.

Gustafsson died on 2 April 2016. He is buried at Katarina kyrkogård in Stockholm, a cemetery notable as the resting place of many prominent Swedish cultural figures. His grave is situated next to that of his close friend, Nobel laureate poet Tomas Tranströmer. This part of the graveyard has therefore come to be known as the "Poets Corner."

== Writing ==
Gustafsson published poetry, novels, short stories, critical essays, and editorials. He gained international recognition as a Swedish writer. By 1990, he had already received a dozen major literary awards including the Prix européen de l'essai Charles-Veillon in 1983, Una Vita per la Letteratura in 1989, as well as the Swedish Bellman Prize in 1990. He won a John Simon Guggenheim Memorial Foundation Fellowship for poetry in 1994. Among later awards were the Gerard-Bonnier-Preis in 2006, the Goethe Medal in 2009, and the Thomas Mann Prize in 2015. He won the 2016 International Nonino Prize in Italy.

Gustafsson's novels and poetry have been translated into fifteen languages, the most often translated being the novels The Death of a Beekeeper (En biodlares död), Bernard Foy's Third Castling (Bernard Foys tredje rockad), and Afternoon of a Tiler (En kakelsättares eftermiddag). Harold Bloom includes Gustafsson in The Western Canon: The Books and School of the Ages (1994, p. 557).

The Death of a Beekeeper, published in 1978, is Gustafsson's best-known novel. John Updike praised it as "a beautiful work, lyrical and bleak, resonant and terse." Ia Dübois has called it "one of his greatest works." Eva Stenskar has written that it "seems so effortless yet lyrical that only an artist at the height of his powers could've produced it." Its main theme is the agony of disease, as it follows Vesslan—a beekeeper who is dying of cancer—through entries he makes on notepads. The book's innovative structure allows Gustafsson to explore identity through its expression in a variety of forms: imagination, memory and even the mundane details of life. The book's central theme is revealed by the repeated motto of the protagonist, "We never give up. We begin anew." Gustafsson himself has described it as "A book about pain. It describes a journey into the centre where pain rules—and pain can tolerate no rivals." The novel was re-published in 1984 as the last in a five-novel sequence Sprickorna i muren (The Cracks in the Wall), the other volumes being Herr Gustafsson själv, Yllet, Familjefesten, and Sigismund.

Bernard Foy's Third Castling (1986) is nearly as well known as The Death of a Beekeeper. Its settings are Sweden; Paris; Worpswede, Germany; and Texas. The overt genre is the detective story, but there are three plots, and Bernard Foy is three separate characters: a Houston rabbi, an old Swedish poet, and a Swedish teenager. Each gradually turns into a character in the writing of the succeeding Foy. Gustafsson said that he was prompted by a “connection to Descartes' dream argument: You start with a story and it proves to be the story of a completely different person who is dreaming up the story which proves to be the story of a third person and it is all written by one or another person.” A similar cross-fertilization of philosophy and literature has been achieved, according to Andreas Dorschel, in Gustafsson's Dekanen (The Dean) (2003); in this case, the central notion is time.

In 1989, Gustafsson ventured into the field of science fiction and published Det sällsamma djuret från norr och andra science-fiction-berättelser. The book takes place 40,000 years into the future, when humans are extinct and the galaxy is populated by artificial intelligences. It is a philosophical exploration of life and existence and can be seen as an homage to Stanislav Lem.

Gustafsson's two major fields of interest interacted from the start of his career. In 2003, he wrote that "sometimes I cannot see any sharp boundary between [my literary work] and [my philosophical work]. I tend to regard myself as a philosopher who has turned literature into one of his tools." When asked where he finds his inspiration, Gustafsson answered "I listen. I listen and I look. Creativity knows no rules. You can get an idea for a novel from a little something someone says, or just a face you see. A rabbi once told me that when God spoke to Moses in that bush, it wasn't in a thundering voice but in a very weak voice. You have to listen carefully for that voice. You have to be very sharp."

In 2003, Yllet, the second novel in The Cracks in the Wall (Sprickorna i Muren) series was made into a feature film, directed by Jimmy Karlsson and starring Magnus Krepper.

While the problem of identity has been the defining theme of Gustafsson's writings, his social criticism often vexed the Swedish cultural elite. As a result, he is seen as a controversial writer in Sweden rather than as one embraced by the establishment.

In 2016, he received the Zbigniew Herbert International Literary Award.

Gustafsson describing himself at the Gothenburg bookfair in 2012 (in English).

== Awards and honors ==
- 1960 – Svenska Dagbladets litteraturpris for Bröderna
- 1962 – Aftonbladets litteraturpris
- 1979 – Litteraturfrämjandets stora romanpris
- 1983 – Carl Emil Englund Prize for Världens tystnad före Bach
- 1983 – Prix International Charles Veillon des Essais
- 1986 – Signe Ekblad-Eldh Award
- 1986 – Heinrich Steffens Prize (Germany)
- 1986 – Officier de l'Ordre des Arts et des Lettres (France)
- 1987 – Övralidspriset
- 1989 – Una Vita per la Letteratura (Italy)
- 1990 – Samfundet De Nios Stora Pris
- 1990 – Sveriges Radios Lyrikpris
- 1990 – Bellman Prize
- 1993 – International Swede of the Year
- 1994 – Guggenheim Fellowship for poetry
- 1996 – Pilotpriset
- 1996 – Grinzane Cavour Prize (Italy)
- 2003 – Aniarapriset
- 2006 – Gerard Bonniers pris
- 2006 – Tomas Tranströmer Prize
- 2006 – Litteris et Artibus
- 2008 – John Landquist Prize
- 2009 – Selma Lagerlöf Prize
- 2009 – Goethe Medal (Germany)
- 2012 – Nils Ferlin Prize
- 2014 – Swedish Academy Nordic Prize
- 2015 – Thomas Mann Prize (Germany)
- 2016 – International Nonino Prize (Italy)
- 2016 – Zbigniew Herbert International Literary Award
- Order of Merit of the Federal Republic of Germany

== Bibliography ==
=== Novels and stories ===
- Vägvila (1957; not available in English)
- Poeten Brumbergs sista dagar och död (1959; not available in English)
- Bröderna (The Brothers, 1960; not available in English)
- Följeslagarna (The Companions, 1962; not available in English)
- Förberedelser till flykt och andra berättelser (1963; not available in English)
- Den egentliga berättelsen om herr Arenander (The Real Story of Mr. Arenander, 1966; not available in English)
- Herr Gustafsson själv (Mr. Gustafsson Himself, 1971; not available in English) – Sprickorna i muren series
- Yllet (1973; not available in English) – Sprickorna i muren series
- Sommar berättelser (Summer Stories, 1973; not available in English)
- Familjefesten (Family Reunion, 1975; not available in English) – Sprickorna i muren series
- Sigismund, or the Memories of a Baroque Polish Prince ISBN 978-0-8112-0924-3 (Sigismund, ur en polsk barockfurst minnen, 1976) – Sprickorna i muren series
- The Tennis Players ISBN 978-0-8112-0861-1 (Tennisspelarna, 1977)
- Den lilla världen (The Small World, 1977; not available in English)
- The Death of a Beekeeper ISBN 978-0-8112-1775-0 ISBN 978-0-8112-0810-9 (En biodlares död, 1978) – Sprickorna i muren series
- Stories of Happy People ISBN 978-0-8112-0978-6 (Berättelser om lyckliga människor, 1981)
- Funeral Music for Freemasons (Sorgemusik för frimurare, 1983)
- Sprickorna i muren (The Cracks in the Wall, collected edition, 1984)
- Bernard Foy's Third Castling ISBN 978-0-8112-1086-7 (Bernard Foys tredje rockad, 1986)
- Spegelskärvor (Mirror Shards, 1987; not available in English)
- Samlade berättelser (Collected Stories, 1987; not available in English)
- Det sällsamma djuret från norr och andra science-fiction-berättelser (1989; not available in English)
- A Tiler's Afternoon ISBN 978-0-8112-1240-3 (En kakelsättares eftermiddag, 1991)
- The Tale of a Dog ISBN 978-0-8112-1395-0 (Historien med hunden, 1993)
- Tjänarinnan (The Handmaiden, 1996; not available in English)
- Windy berättar (Windy Tells, 1999; not available in English)
- Blom och den andra magentan (2001; not available in English)
- Dekanen (The Dean, 2003; not available in English)
- Fantastiska berättelser (Fantastic Stories, 2008; collected edition)
- Fru Sorgedahls vackra vita armar (Mrs. Sorgedahl's Beautiful White Arms, 2008; not available in English)
- Mannen på den blå cykeln (The Man with the Blue Bicycle, 2012; not available in English)
- Doktor Wassers recept (The Prescription of Doctor Wasser, posthumously 2019; not available in English)
- Dr Weiss sista uppdrag (The Final Task of Dr. Weiss, posthumously 2019; not available in English)

=== Poetry ===
- Ballongfararna (The Balloonists, 1962; not available in English)
- En förmiddag i Sverige (A Morning in Sweden, 1963; not available in English)
- Selected Poems (1972; translated by Robin Fulton)
- En resa till jordens medelpunkt och andra dikter (A Journey to the Centre of the Earth, 1966; not available in English)
- En privatmans dikter (A Private Man's Poems, 1967; not available in English)
- Bröderna Wright uppsöker Kitty Hawk och andra dikter (1968; not available in English)
- Dikter (Poems, 1968; not available in English)
- Kärleksförklaring till en sefardisk dam (Declaration of Love to a Sephardic Lady, 1970; not available in English)
- Warm Rooms and Cold (1975; translated by Yvonne L. Sandstroem)
- Fosterlandet under jorden (The Fatherland Underground, 1973; not available in English)
- Sonetter (Sonnets, 1977; not available in English)
- Artesiska brunnar, cartesianska drömmar (Artesian Wells, Cartesian Dreams, 1980; not available in English)
- Världens tystnad före Bach (1982)
- Ur bild i bild: samlade dikter 1950–1980 (Collected Poems 1950–1980, 1982)
- Fåglarna (The Birds, 1984; not available in English)
- The Stillness of the World Before Bach ISBN 978-0-8112-1058-4 (1988; collection of poems selected from volumes published between 1962 and 1984; edited by Christopher Middleton; translations by the editor, Robin Fulton, Harriett Watts, Yvonne L. Sandstroem, and Philip Martin)
- Fyra poeter (Four Poets, 1988; not available in English)
- Förberedelser för vintersäsongen: elegier och andra dikter (Preparations for the Winter Season, 1990; not available in English)
- Där alfabetet har tvåhundra bokstäver: samlade dikter 1981–1991 (Collected Poems 1981–1991, 1992)
- Stenkista (Stone Coffin, 1994; not available in English)
- Variationer över ett tema av Silfverstolpe (Variations on a Theme by Silfverstolpe, 1996; not available in English)
- Elegies and Other Poems ISBN 978-0-8112-1441-4 (2000; collection of poems selected from volumes published between 1968 and 1996; edited by Christopher Middleton; translations by the editor, Yvonne L. Sandstroem, Philip Martin, and Bill Brookshire)
- En tid i Xanadu (A Time in Xanadu, 2002)
- A Time in Xanadu (2008; translated by John Irons) ISBN 978-1-55659-275-1
- Bränder: tolkade dikter från Vergilius till Heaney (Fires: Interpreted Poems from Virgil to Heaney, 2004)
- Om begagnandet av elden (On the Use of Fire, 2010; not available in English)
- Århundraden och minuter (Centuries and Minutes, selected poems, 2010)
- Elden och döttrarna: valda och nya dikter (The Fire and the Daughters, 2012; not available in English)
- Selected Poems (2015; collection of poems selected from volumes published between 1998 and 2012, plus unpublished poems; translated by John Irons) ISBN 978-1-85224-997-7
- Etyder för en gammal skrivmaskin (Études for an Old Typewriter, posthumously 2016)

=== Essays and non-fiction ===
- Nio brev om romanen (Nine Letters on the Novel, 1961; with Lars Bäckström)
- The Public Dialogue in Sweden (1964)
- Konsten att segla med drakar och andra scener ur privatlivet (1969)
- Utopier och andra essäer om dikt och liv (Utopias and Other Essays, 1969)
- Kommentarer (Comments, 1972)
- Den onödiga samtiden (The Unnecessary Present, 1974; with Jan Myrdal)
- Strandhugg i svensk poesi (Excursions in Swedish Poetry, 1976)
- Truth and Lie (Språk och Lögn. En essä om språkfilosofisk extremism i nittonde århundradet, 1978)
- Filosofier (Philosophies, 1979)
- Konfrontationer (Confrontations, 1979)
- Afrikanskt försök (African Attempt, 1980)
- För liberalismen (For Liberalism, 1981)
- Stunder vid ett trädgårdsbord (Moments at a Garden Table, 1984)
- Bilderna på Solstadens murar (The Pictures on the Walls of the Sun City, 1985)
- Problemformuleringsprivilegiet (The Problem-Formulation Privilege, 1989)
- Landskapets långsamma förändringar (The Slow Changes of the Landscape, 1992)
- Ett minnespalats: vertikala memoarer (A Memory Palace: Vertical Memoirs, 1994)
- De andras närvaro (The Presence of Others, 1995)
- Vänner bland de döda: essäer om litteratur (Friends Among the Dead: Essays on Literature, 1997)
- Strövtåg i hembygden (Wanderings in the Homeland, 1999)
- Meditationer: en filosofisk bilderbok (Meditations: A Philosophical Picture Book, 2000)
- Herr Gustafssons familjebok (Mr. Gustafsson's Family Book, 2006; with Agneta Blomqvist)
- Mot noll: matematiska fantasier (Toward Zero: Mathematical Fantasies, 2011)

=== Drama ===
- Två maktspel (Two Power Games, 1970)
- Huset i Oneida (The House in Oneida, 1971)

=== Translations ===
- Peter Weiss: Rapporter (Reports, 1968; co-translator)
- Robert Bly: Krig och tystnad: dikter (War and Silence: Poems, 1969; co-translator with Göran Sonnevi, Lasse Söderberg, and Tomas Tranströmer)
- Tuwia Rübner: Dikter (Poems, 1977; with Madeleine Gustafsson)
- Michael Krüger: I förnuftets dagsljus: dikter (In the Daylight of Reason: Poems, 1985)
- Eugène Guillevic: Bröd och stenar: dikter (Bread and Stones: Poems, 1985)
- Rainer Maria Rilke: Sonetterna till Orfeus (Sonnets to Orpheus, 1987)
- Christopher Middleton: I det dolda huset: dikter (In the Hidden House: Poems, 1988)
- Seamus Heaney: I syner: dikter (Seeing Things, 1996; with Arne Zettersten)
- Bränder: tolkade dikter från Vergilius till Heaney (Fires: Interpreted Poems from Virgil to Heaney, 2004)

=== Travel writing ===
- Världsdelar (Continents, 1975)
- Kinesisk höst (Chinese Autumn, 1978)

== See also ==
- International Dublin Literary Award
- Zbigniew Herbert International Literary Award
