= Stefan Wild =

German scholar of Quranic studies (born 1937)

Stefan Wild (born 1937) is a German scholar of Quranic studies.

== Biography ==
Born in Leipzig in 1937, Stefan Wild pursued studies in Semitic languages, Islamic Studies, Egyptology, and philosophy at institutions in Munich, Yale, Erlangen, and Tübingen, earning his doctorate in 1961. He began his career as an assistant at the Orient-Institut Beirut and the Oriental seminary at the University of Heidelberg. After completing his habilitation in Munich in 1968, he directed the Orient-Institut Beirut from 1968 to 1973. Wild then held positions at the University of Amsterdam from 1975 to 1977 and at the University of Bonn from 1977 to 2002. He served as a co-editor for Bibliotheca Islamica from 1974 to 1981 and for the International Journal for the Study of Modern Islam until 2009. He became emeritus in April 2002 and was a fellow at the Berlin Institute for Advanced Study in the same year. In 2005, he was honored with the Helga und Edzard Reuter-Stiftung prize for his scholarly work.

== Works ==
- Self-Referentiality in the Qur´an (ed.) (2006)
- The Qur'an as Text (ed.) (1996)
