= Friedrich-Baur-Preis =

German literary award

Friedrich-Baur-Preis was a literary prize of Germany from 1990 to 2017.

== Prize categories ==
- Fine arts
- Literature
- Music
- Performing arts
- Film and media art
