= Thomas Mann Prize =

German literary award

The Thomas Mann Prize (German: Thomas-Mann-Preis der Hansestadt Lübeck und der Bayerischen Akademie der Schönen Künste, lit. 'Thomas Mann Prize of the Hanseatic City of Lübeck and the Bavarian Academy of Fine Arts') is a German literary prize awarded jointly by Lübeck and the Bavarian Academy of Fine Arts since 2010.

It is given in alternate years in Lübeck and in Munich. The award is the product of a merger of two prizes in 2010, the Thomas Mann Preis der Hansestadt Lübeck (Thomas Mann Prize Lübeck) and the Großer Literaturpreis (Great Literature Prize) of the Bavarian Academy of Fine Arts. The Thomas Mann Prize Lübeck was first awarded in 1975; the Great Literature Prize in 1950. The prize money is 25,000 Euros.

== Recipients ==
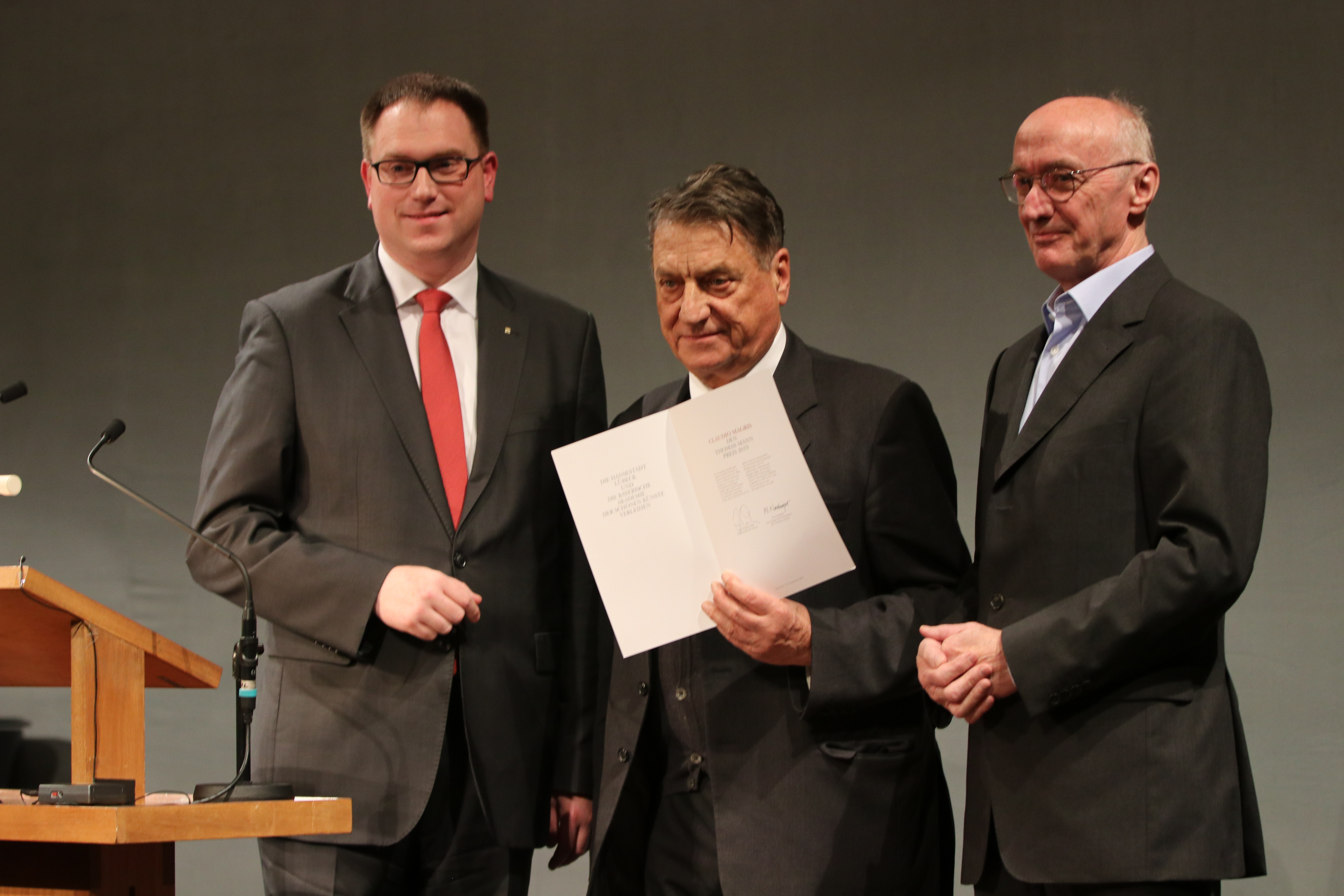
The Thomas Mann Prize 2019 to Claudio Magris (center) was awarded in the Bavarian Academy of Fine Arts by Jan Lindau, Mayor of the Hanseatic City of Lübeck (left) and Winfried Nerdinger, President of the academy (right).

- 2010: Christa Wolf
- 2011: Jan Assmann
- 2012: Thomas Hürlimann
- 2013: Juli Zeh
- 2014: Rüdiger Safranski
- 2015: Lars Gustafsson
- 2016: Jenny Erpenbeck
- 2017: Brigitte Kronauer
- 2018: Mircea Cărtărescu
- 2019: Claudio Magris
- 2020: Nora Bossong
- 2021: Norbert Gstrein
- 2022: Jonathan Franzen
- 2023: Ralf Rothmann
- 2024: Navid Kermani
- 2025: Katja Lange-Müller
- 2026: David Grossman
