= Kurt Magnus (radio personality) =

German radio broadcasting pioneer

Kurt Magnus (March 28, 1887 – June 20, 1962) was a German lawyer and politician, best known as a pioneer in establishing radio broadcasting in Germany.

He was born to Ernest and Louise Magnus in Kassel.

He was a member of the supervisory board and then chairman of the State Collection Company for Public Goods.

He was the first president (1951-1962) of the Goethe-Institut.

The Kurt Magnus Award established by ARD in his name is given to young radio professionals since 1963.

== Decorations ==
- Iron Cross, 2nd and 1st classes
- Knight's Cross of the House Order of Hohenzollern
- 1952: Grand Cross of the Order of Merit of the Federal Republic of Germany
- 1957: Grand Cross with star of the Order of Merit of the Federal Republic of Germany
