= Brigitte Kronauer =

German writer (1940–2019)

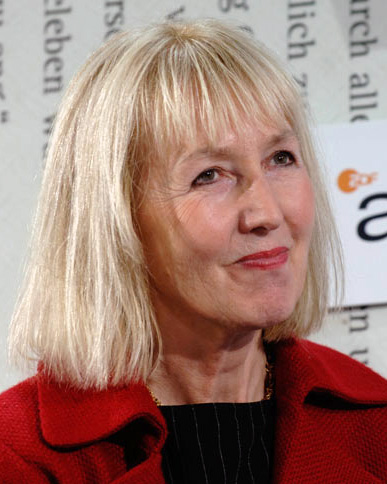
- Kronauer in 2005
- Born: 29 December 1940; Essen, Germany
- Died: 22 July 2019 (aged 78); Hamburg, Germany
- Occupations: Author; novelist
- Awards: Georg Büchner Prize; Jean-Paul-Preis; Thomas Mann Prize

Brigitte Kronauer (29 December 1940 – 22 July 2019) was a German writer who lived in Hamburg. Her novels, written in the tradition of Jean Paul with artful writing and an ironic undertone, were awarded several prizes, including in 2005 the Georg Büchner Prize, in 2011 the Jean-Paul-Preis and in 2017 the Thomas Mann Prize.

== Life ==
Kronauer was born in Essen, and grew up with her mother. She studied pedagogy and worked as a teacher in Aachen and Göttingen. She moved to Hamburg in the mid-1970s, where she began her literary work. Her first novel appeared in 1980, Frau Mühlenbeck im Gehäus, published by Klett-Cotta Verlag, which also published all her following works. The novel has autobiographic elements. Its language was unusual in the literature after World War II, with sentences constructed with acrobatic audacity ("von akrobatischer Gewagtheit"). Kronauer named Jean Paul as influential for her work. As in his writing, Kronauer's sentences often contain double-meanings and ironic allusions.

She wrote successful novels such as Berittener Bogenschütze (1986), Teufelsbrück (2000), Verlangen nach Musik und Gebirge (2004), Errötende Mörder (2007), Zwei schwarze Jäger (2009), Gewäsch und Gewimmel (2013) and Der Scheik von Aachen (2016). Her novel Das Schöne, Schäbige, Schwankende is scheduled to appear in August 2019. It is focused on a woman writer, full of self-irony.

In 2005, she was awarded the Georg Büchner Prize for her literary oeuvre. Among other awards, she received the Jean-Paul-Preis in 2011, and the Thomas Mann Prize in 2017.

Kronauer died on 22 July 2019 in Hamburg, after a long illness.

== Legacy ==
Kronauer's colleague Martin Mosebach, who delivered the laudatory speech when she received the Thomas Mann Prize, said in an interview by Deutschlandfunk on 24 July 2019 that he regards her as writing in the tradition of Jean Paul in a noble way, mentioning aspects such a sublime artistry ("kunstvoll sublim") and a tender humour with a floating, ironic, delicate undertone ("schwebender, ironischer, zarter Unterton"). He described her as a person open to visual impressions, describing a character's emotions by noting how they are reflected in mimics, and great nature scenes, realising how nature "arches over the little odd human being" ("Die Natur wölbt sich über das kleine kauzige Menschenwesen"), again similar to Jean Paul. He described her as a person with a penetrating mind, a perfect careful control of expression, always trying hard to find the right word, and of great kindliness ("... eben diese einzigartige Gegenwart eines durchdringenden Verstandes, einer vollkommenen, sehr, sehr sorgfältigen Kontrolliertheit ihres Ausdrucks, ein ungeheures Bemühen, immer das genau richtige Wort zu finden – und eine große Liebenswürdigkeit").

The FAZ called her one of the greatest post-World War II women writers in German.

When she received the Jean-Paul-Preis of Bavaria, her writing was described by the jury: "The brilliance of her style makes her an exceptional phenomenon in contemporary German literature" ("Die Brillanz ihres Stils macht sie zu einer Ausnahmeerscheinung in der deutschen Gegenwartsliteratur"), with characteristics such as "inventiveness, humanity and a sense of humour that accompanies the often idiosyncratic characters of her books with love, and never betrays them" ("Erfindungskraft, Humanität und ein Humor, der die oft eigenwilligen Figuren ihrer Bücher mit Liebe begleitet und niemals verrät"), while also considered the "grand master of spite" ("Großmeisterin der Boshaftigkeit").

== Novels ==
Kronauer's novels, published by Klett-Cotta in Stuttgart and held by the German National Library, include:

- Frau Mühlenbeck im Gehäus, 1980, ISBN 3-12-904501-5; dtv, München 1984, ISBN 3-423-10356-6
- Rita Münster, 1983, ISBN 3-608-95218-7; dtv, München 1991, ISBN 3-423-11430-4
- Berittener Bogenschütze, 1986, ISBN 3-608-95420-1; dtv, München 2000, ISBN 3-423-11291-3
- Die Frau in den Kissen, 1990; dtv, München 1996, ISBN 3-423-12206-4
- Das Taschentuch, 1994, ISBN 3-608-93220-8; dtv, München 2001, ISBN 3-423-12888-7
- Teufelsbrück, 2000, ISBN 3-608-93070-1; dtv, München 2003, ISBN 3-423-13037-7
- Verlangen nach Musik und Gebirge, 2004, ISBN 3-608-93571-1; dtv, München 2006, ISBN 3-423-13511-5
- Errötende Mörder, 2007, ISBN 978-3-608-93730-5; dtv, München 2010, ISBN 978-3-423-13898-7
- Zwei schwarze Jäger, 2009, ISBN 978-3-608-93885-2
- Gewäsch und Gewimmel, 2013, ISBN 978-3-608-98006-6
- Der Scheik von Aachen, 2016, ISBN 978-3-608-98314-2

== Awards ==
- 1985: Fontane-Preis of Berlin
- 1989: Heinrich-Böll-Preis of Cologne
- 1998: Hubert-Fichte-Preis of Hamburg
- 2000: Kronauer was chosen for Mainzer Stadtschreiber of 2001, a literary prize awarded by the television channels ZDF and 3sat as well as the city of Mainz. Kronauer returned the award in March 2001, however, due to disagreements with ZDF about the so-called "electronic diary", a film whose production and broadcasting would have been part of the award, along with 24.000 DM prize money and the right to lodge in the Gutenberg Museum for one year.
- 2005: Georg Büchner Prize
- 2011: Jean-Paul-Preis
- 2017: Thomas Mann Prize
