= Kupsch =

Kupsch is a surname. Notable people with the surname include:

- Anita Kupsch (1940-2025), German actress
- Bob Kupsch (1933–1998), Australian rules footballer
- Hans-Karl von Kupsch (1937–2020), German jurist, managing director of the Börsenverein des Deutschen Buchhandels
- Ken Kupsch (born 1938), former Australian rules footballer
