= Claudia Reinhardt =

German photographer

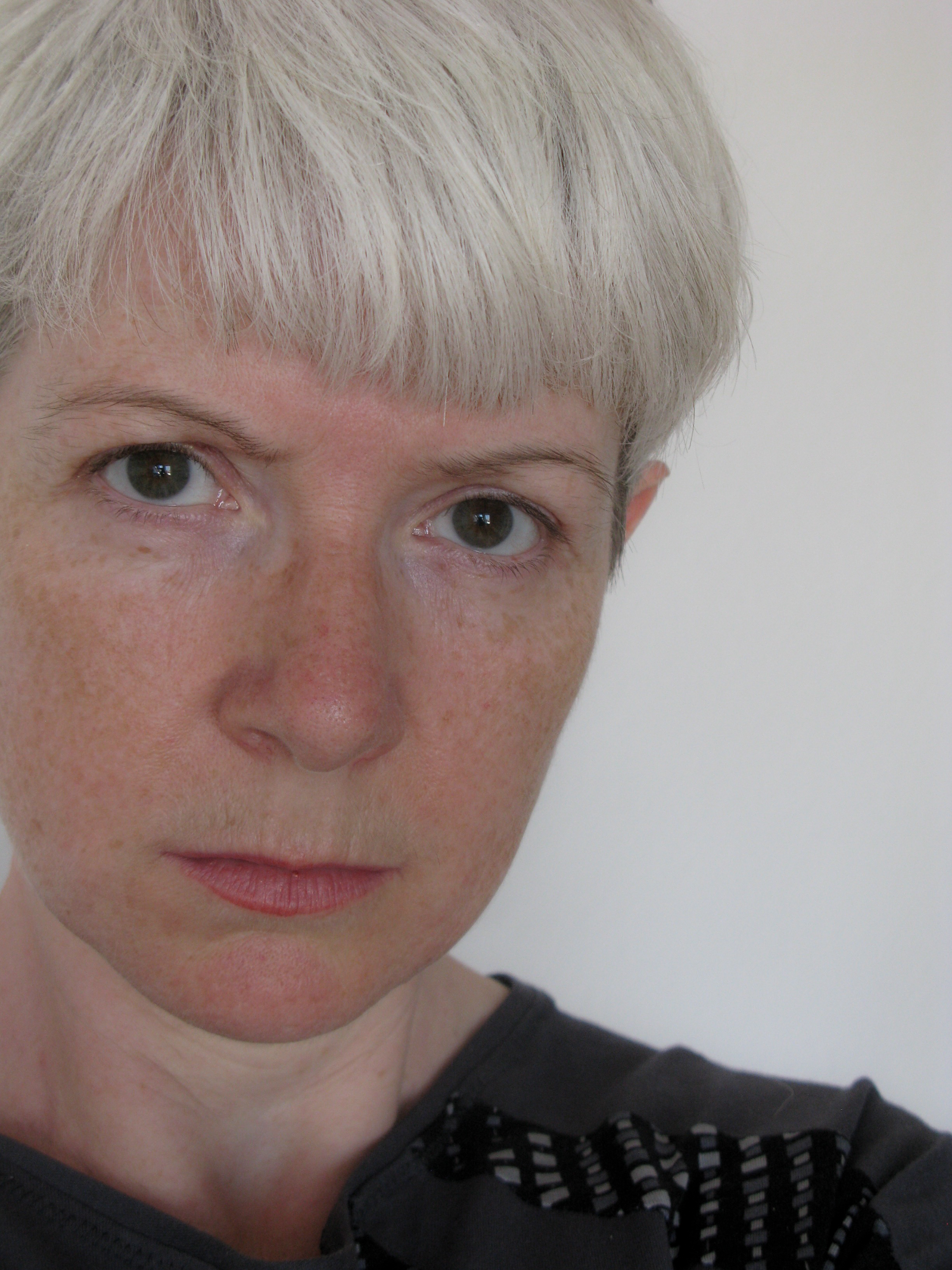
- Claudia Reinhardt (2010)
- Born: 1964 (age 61–62); Viernheim, West Germany
- Known for: photography
- Website: Official Website

Claudia Reinhardt (born 1964 in Viernheim) is a contemporary German photographer. She lives and works in Norway and Berlin.

== Early life ==
Claudia Reinhardt was born in southern Germany in 1964. In the age of eighteen she left her home town to live for one year in London. Back in Germany she studied philosophy and literary history in Heidelberg. After two years she broke her studies and started to teach herself in photography. She moved to Berlin to work as a photo assistant. After few years she moved to Hamburg to work as a freelance fashion photographer. Her work was published in different magazines (Szene, Tempo, ID- London). In 1988–1994 she was a student at the art academy in Hamburg. Her main teacher was Bernhard Johannes Blume. In that time she founded the art magazine Neidtogether with Ina Wudtke and Heiko Wichmann. Through a grant from the DAAD (Deutsch Akademischer Austauschdienst) she was able to live and work in Los Angeles, where she visited the University of California and the Irwin University/California. After this year she moved back to Berlin. In 2000 she started her teaching job at the Art academy in Bergen/Norway. She held that position as associated professor until 2012. Nowadays she lives and works as an artist in Berlin and Oslo.

== Photography ==
=== Killing Me Softly-Todesarten ===
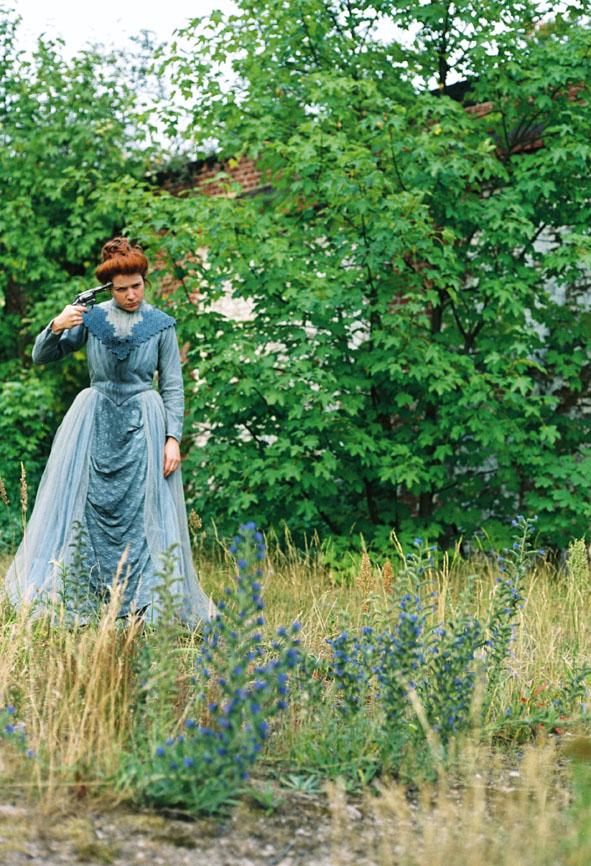
CLARA (Clara Immerwahr) from Killing Me Softly -Todesarten

Killing Me Softly- Todesarten is a series of ten photographs depicting the suicides of ten female artists, with Claudia Reinhardt as the model for all of them. The series includes Sarah Kane, Unica Zürn, Clara Immerwahr, Sylvia Plath, Adelheid Duvanel, Ingeborg Bachmann, Anne Sexton, Diane Arbus, Pierre Molinier, and Karin Boye

=== No Place Like Home ===
No Place Like Home is a series of 25 photographs based on the town, Viernheim, which Reinhardt grew up in.

=== Tomb Of Love - Grabkammer der Liebe ===
Dødspar, Liebespaare is a series of 23 photographs where Reinhardt stages the suicides of couples. Like in her series Killing Me Softly - Todesarten she uses authentic histories to visualize the last moment of these peoples lives. The series includes Stefan Zweig and Lotte Zweig, Heinrich von Kleist and Henriette Vogel, André Gorz and his wife Dorine, Jochen Klepper and his wife Johanna Stein and her daughter Renate, Arthur Koester and Cynthia Jefferies, Bernard und Georgette Cazes and others.

== Video installation ==
=== Liebesmüh`- Lovers Labour ===
Liebesmüh`- Loves Labour is a series of five videos with a total running time of 30 minutes. It depicts fictional female characters who were created by male authors in the end of 19th century. The serie includes: Nora by Henrik Ibsen, Nana by Émile Zola, Effi Briest by Theodore Fontane, Anna Karenina by Leo Tolstoi and Madame Bovary by Gustave Flaubert.

=== No Place Like Home ===
No Place Like Home is a video based on her photo series with the same name and has a running time of 12 minutes.

== Collections ==
Reinhardt's work can be found in the collections of Gaby u. Wilhelm Schurmann, Aachen, and F.C. Gundlach, Hamburg, among others.

== Exhibitions ==
=== Solo exhibitions/selection ===
- 1998: Schau mich bitte nicht so an..., Galeria Prowincjonalna, Slubice, Poland
- 1999: She must be seeing things, The Pound Gallery, Seattle, United States
- 2000: Claudia Reinhardt presents..., Galerie Hallamar/Dietrich, Berlin
- 2001: Killing Me Softly/Todesarten - Skizzen, Galerie White Cube, Bergen, Norway
- 2001: Claudia Reinhardt and Birgit Böchers, Galerie Fahrradladen, Frankfurt/Offenbach, Germany
- 2004: Killing Me Softly/Todesarten - Bookrelease, Galerie Engler& Piper, Berlin
- 2005: Killing Me Softly/Todesarten, Kulturhuset Tromsø
- 2005: Shot Stories, Galerie Richter & Brückner, Köln
- 2007: Underdagen, Hordaland Kunstsenter, Bergen, Norway
- 2007: Black Hole Memorise, Kunstverein Langenhagen, Germany
- 2008: Per Teljer & Claudia Reinhardt, Skänes Kunstförening Malmö, Sweden
- 2008: Heimat-Hotel, Breda Foto Bienale, IDFX Electron, Breda, Nederlands
- 2011: Liebesmüh' - Lover's Labour, Galerie Richter & Brückner, Köln; Kunstforening Rauland, Norge
- 2012: Trauerarbeit, Rom 8, Bergen, Norge
- 2014: Dødspar, Liebespaare, Haus Dietrich, Berlin
- 2015: Que nos espera nas ruas?, De Liceira 18, Porto, Portugal, Dødspar, Liebespaare, Galerie Format, Malmö, Sweden
- 2016: Galerie Malopolski Ogród Sztuki, Krakau, Poland

=== Group exhibitions ===
- 1999: Rosa für Jungs- Hellblau für Mädchen, NGBK Kunstamt Kreuzberg, Berlin
- 1999: Neid Show, Künstlerhaus Bethaninen, Berlin
- 2000: Kein Betreff" Berlin Video, Rumseksogfyrre Arhus/Denmark
- 2001: Communication Front 2001, Plovdiv/Bulgaria
- 2001: Slubice-Berlin, Galeria Prowincjonalna, Slubice/Poland
- 2002: the island and the aeroplane, Galerie Sparwasser, Berlin
- 2003: Same- Different, Galerie Nova, Bukarest/Rumania
- 2004: Killing Me Softly - Todesarten, Pro qm, Berlin
- 2006: Me, Myself and I, Galerie gutleut 15, Frankfurt; Galerie Hobbyshop, München; KONSORTIUM Düsseldorf
- 2007: Global Feminism, Brooklyn Museum, New York City; Davis Museum and Cultural Center, Wellesley, Massachusetts
- 2007: Töten, Zeitraumexit, Mannheim. Germany
- 2007: Lebe Wohl. Suizidalität, Kunst und Gesellschaft, Kunsthaus Hamburg, Germany
- 2008: Western Norway Exhibition/Norway, Ålesund, Kunstmuseet Kube; Førde, Sunnfjord Kunstlag; Bergen, HKS - Hordaland Kunstsenter;Haugesund, Kunstforening;Stavanger, Kunstforening
- 2008: Pineapple Videobar, Skånes Konst, Galleri Leonard, Malmö/Sweden
- 2008: Photo Art Erosion, Klaipeda Hall, Lithuania
- 2009: Videoworks from Norway/Screening, Gallery Fine Arts Academy. Bosnia Hercegovina, Trebinje
- 2009: You Can Find Me In The Lexicon, In The Lexicon, Migros Museum, Zürich
- 2009: Art Video Exchange- international Video Festival, Rauland Kunstverein, Norway
- 2010: Everybody, Kunsthalle Memingen MEWO, Germany
- 2010: Art Video Festival, Marco Testaccio, La Pelanda, Museum of Contemporary Art, Rome, Italy
- 2011: Stories From Under The Pale Moon, Meta House, Phnom Penh, Cambodia
- 2011: Dirty Fingers, Ruine, Die Wiesenburg, Berlin.
- 2012: art:screen Fest Örebro, Sweden
- 2015: Exitus, Galerie im Körnerpark, Berlin
- 2012: Traumschiffkollektiv - Queere Filmtage, Beauty Salon, Zûrich
- 2013: art:screen Fest, Reykjavík, Iceland
- 2015: Danish Graphic Association, Kopenhagen, Dänemark,
- 2015: Uncany Feminism, Coreana Museum, Seoul, Korea
- 2015: 25 Jahre Künstlerhaus Art Acker, Galerie Art Acker, Berlin
- 2015: Kvinner! Frem! Museum of Contemporary Art, Roskilde, Denmark
- 2015: Wer war Albert Norden?, Station urbaner Kultur, NGBK, Berlin
- 2015: Wer ist wo wer? - Identite: Menneske og sted,Østlanduststillingen, Oslo and Kiel
- 2015: Exitus, Tod, Trauer und Melancholie, Galerie im Körnerpark, Berlin (curated by Claudia Reinhardt)

== Selected published works ==
- Reinhardt, Claudia. Schau mich bitte nicht so an... Slubice, Poland: Galeria Prowincjonalna.
- Reinhardt, Claudia (2004). Killing Me Softly- Todesarten. Aviva Verlag/Berlin and Bergen National Academy of the Arts. ISBN 3-932338-21-9.
- Reinhardt, Claudia [Übers.: Jana (2005). No place like home (1. Aufl. ed.). Berlin: Verbrecher-Verl. ISBN 3-87512-413-8.
- Reinhardt, Claudia (2011). Die vorgestellte Frau. Köln: R&B Verlag. ISBN 978-3-9808554-7-1.
