= Caroline-Schlegel-Preis =

The Caroline-Schlegel-Preis is a literary award of the city of Jena in Germany, given for outstanding work in the genres of essay and feuilleton in German. The award began with a public competition in 2000, to celebrate the Romantikerhaus (lit.: House of the Romantics, the former residence of the philosopher Johann Gottlieb Fichte) opening as a museum for literary culture. Starting from 2002, the award has been given once every three years. There is a main prize (Hauptpreis: €5,000) and a secondary prize for early-career entrants (Förderpreis: €2,500). The prize money of €7,500 is funded by an anonymous private patron.

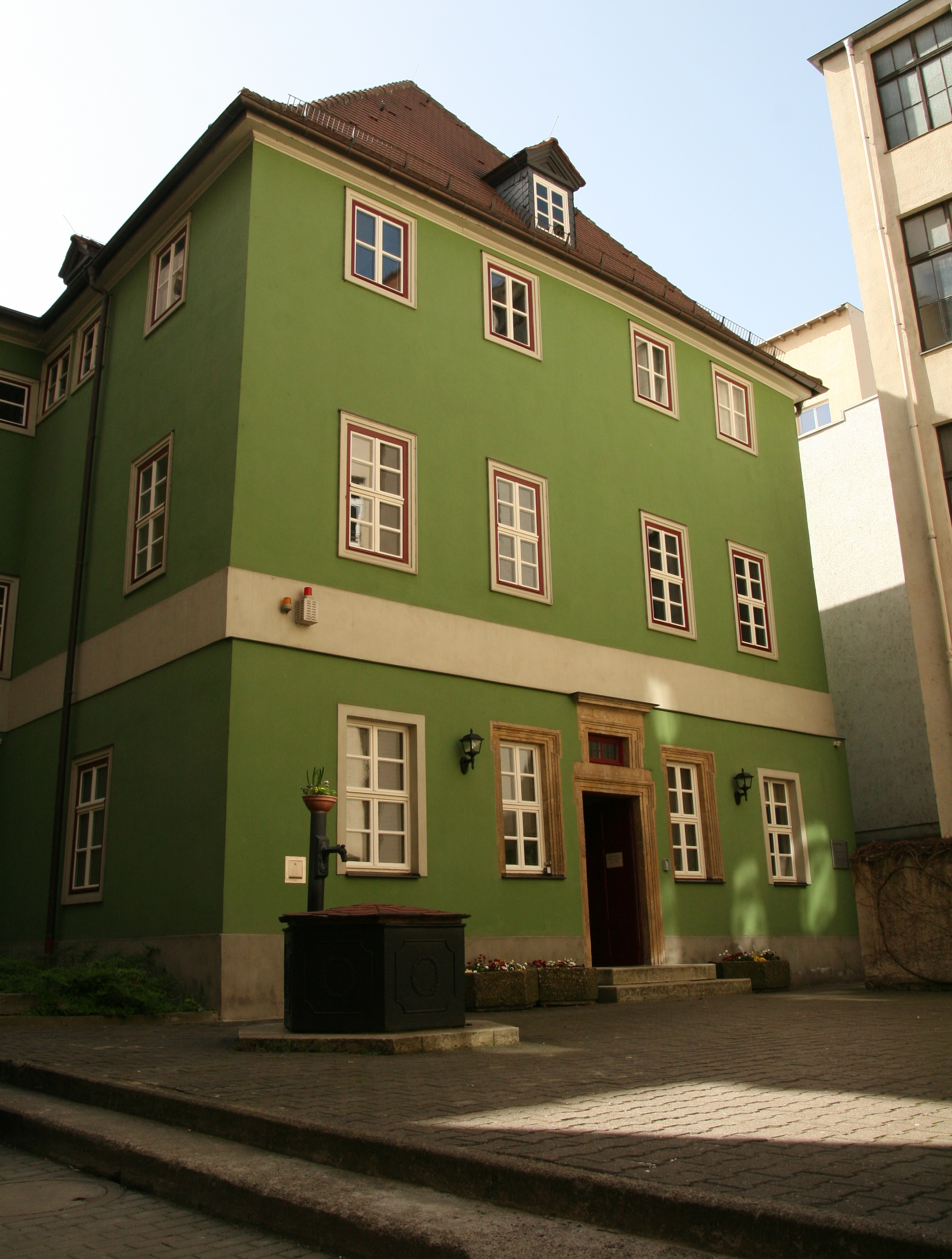
The Romantikerhaus in Jena, now a literary museum honoring the Jena Romantics

== Naming ==
The award is named for the notable German freethinker Caroline Schlegel (1763–1809), a member of the Jena Romantics and daughter of Göttingen professor and theologist Johann David Michaelis. She contributed to the Athenaeum, an important magazine for early Romanticism founded by Friedrich Schlegel and his brother August Wilhelm Schlegel, to whom she was married for a time. They divorced after his move to Berlin, allowing her to marry philosopher Friedrich Wilhelm Joseph Schelling in 1803. Thus, she is most often referred to in current times with the surname Schelling, but the award chose to use the surname Schlegel, which is most associated with her time in Jena.

== Criteria and Jury ==
The award is selected by an independent jury for an essay that achieves the experimental spirit of early Romanticism in the 21st century and shows both a high level of style and significant literary merit. While typically adhering to the format of one main prize and one secondary prize, the jury has complete discretion over how the award is given out. There is no age limit or explicit criteria for who counts as early-career for the secondary award; again, the jury has discretion. The competition is open to submissions by the author or publisher of the work and by recommendations of "literary institutions and associations." Past jurors include author Gisela Kraft and scholars from Friedrich Schiller University Jena.

== Awardees ==
- 2000 subsidiary award essay: Juli Zeh; secondary award feuilleton/journalism: Steffen Kopetzky
- 2002 main award: Burkhard Spinnen for his essay Skandal (Scandal); subsidiary award: Kai Agthe
- 2005 main award: Sonja Hilzinger
- 2008 main award: Thomas Hürlimann for his essay Über die Treppe (Up the Staircase) from his book Der Sprung in den Papierkorb (The Jump into the Dustbin); subsidiary award: Dietmar Ebert
- 2011 main award: Ina Hartwig for her essay Die absolute Freiheit der Sinne (The Absolute Freedom of the Senses); secondary awards: Christina Müller-Gutowski and Nadja Mayer
- 2014 main award: Andreas Dorschel for his essay Ein verschollen geglaubter Brief der Korinther an Paulus (A Supposedly Lost Epistle of the Corinthians to St Paul); secondary award: Nancy Hünger
- 2017 main award: Christoph Dieckmann for his essay Mein Abendland (My Occident); secondary award: Ronya Othmann
- 2020 main award: Asal Dardan for her essay Neue Jahre (New Years); secondary award: Lara Rüter
