= Jürgen Neffe =

German writer

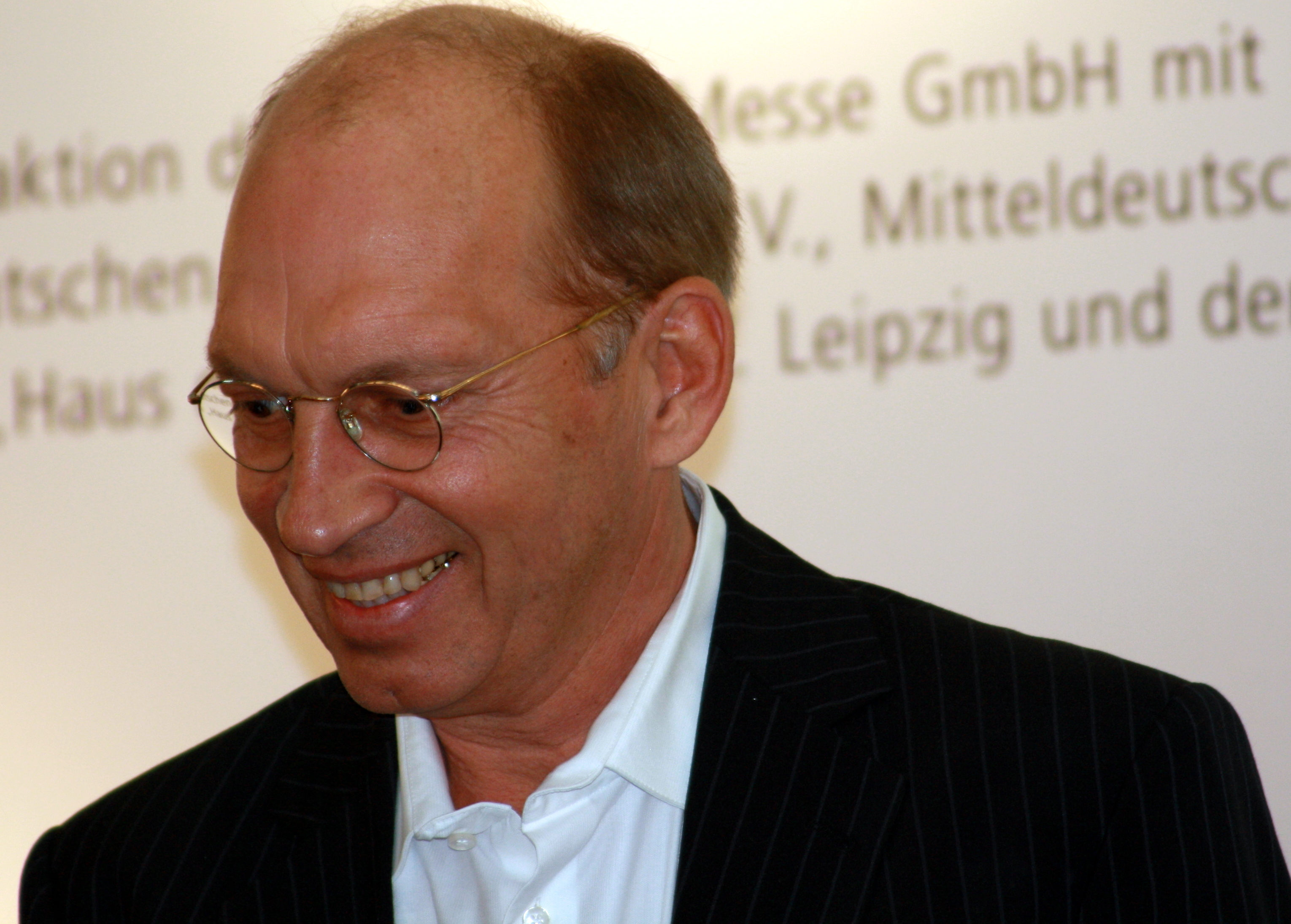
- Neffe in 2009
- Born: 5 June 1956 (age 70); Herne, North Rhine-Westphalia, Germany
- Occupation: Writer

Jürgen Neffe (born 5 June 1956 in Herne, North Rhine-Westphalia, Germany) is a German writer.

== Life ==
Jürgen Neffe received a PhD in biochemistry 1985 from RWTH Aachen University. After graduating, Neffe worked as a reporter for various publications, including Nature, GEO, and Der Spiegel. In 1991, he won third prize in the Egon Erwin Kisch Awards, which are among the most prestigious awards for print journalism in Germany, for his reportage Der Fluch der guten Tat on a burn unit in Pittsburgh, published in GEO.

In the beginning of 2003 he moved from Spiegel to Max Planck Society. He organized, started and then ran its federal office in Berlin for the first year.

In 2005, Neffe published a biography on Albert Einstein, which ranked eighth among non-fiction bestsellers that year in Germany. The book was translated into more than ten languages, including English. In 2007 the Washington Post named it "Book of the Year". It received many favorable reviews.

In 2007 and 2008, Neffe traveled for seven months, recreating Charles Darwin's travels on the Beagle. As a result, he published the book Darwin - Das Abenteuer des Lebens, consisting of a combination of travel writing, science reportage on the development of the theory of evolution, and biographical information about Charles Darwin.

In 2011, Neffe created a new interactive e-book format called Libroid.

In 2014, Neffe published his first novel, Mehr als wir sind (More than we are).

In 2017, Neffe published his highly acclaimed biography on Karl Marx, Marx. Der Unvollendete (The unfinished man).

In 2020, Neffe published his second novel, Das Ding. Der Tag, an dem ich Donald Trump bestahl (The Thing. Or: The Day I Stole from Donald Trump).

„Das Ding. Der Tag, an dem ich Donald Trump bestahl“. Die Fachzeitschrift BuchMarkt bezeichnete das Buch als „Der beste politische Roman des Jahres“ Neffe lives in Berlin. His wife Hania Luczak is also a writer.

== Works ==
- Evidence for an early degradative event to the insulin molecule following binding to hepatocyte receptors; S. M. Juul, R. H. Jones, J. L. Evans, J. Neffe, P. H. Sönksen, D. Brandenburg; Biochim. Biophys. Acta 856, 310-319 (1986)
- Demonstration that the insulin receptor undergoes an early structural modification following insulin binding; S. M. Juul, J. Neffe, J. L. Evans, R. H. Jones, P. H. Sönksen, D. Brandenburg; Biochim. Biophys. Acta 856, 320-324 (1986)
- Irgendwann habe ich einen ganz starken Willen entwickelt. In: Charlotte Kerner: Nicht nur Madame Curie – Frauen, die den Nobelpreis bekamen. Beltz Verlag, Weinheim/ Basel 1999, ISBN 3-407-80862-3.
- Vorbild Einstein - Gedanken zu Wissenschaftspopularisierung und Technikskepsis. In: Frank-Walter Steinmeier, Matthias Machnig (HG.): Made in Germany '21. Hoffmann und Campe, Hamburg 2004, ISBN 3-455-10417-7
- Einstein – eine Biographie. Rowohlt, Reinbek bei Hamburg 2005, ISBN 3-499-61937-7
- EINSTEIN - A Biography. Farrar, Straus and Giroux, New York 2007, Translated by Shelley Frisch, ISBN 978-3-7414-6640-3
- EINSTEIN - A Biography. Polity Press, London 2007, Translated by Shelley Frisch, ISBN 978-0-7456-4220-8
- Darwin. Das Abenteuer des Lebens. C. Bertelsmann, München 2008, ISBN 978-3-570-01091-4.
- Mehr als wir sind. C. Bertelsmann, München 2014, ISBN 978-3-570-10205-3
- Marx. Der Unvollendete. C. Bertelsmann, München 2017, ISBN 978-3-570-10273-2
- Das Ding. Der Tag, an dem ich Donald Trump bestahl. Europa Verlag, München 2020, ISBN 978-3-958-90340-1.
