= Alfred-Kerr-Preis =

The Alfred Kerr Preis (Alfred Kerr Prize) for literary criticism is an annual award funded by the Börsenblatt of the Börsenverein des Deutschen Buchhandels.

The prize commemorates the theatre, literary critic and journalist Alfred Kerr (1867–1948) and is endowed with 5,000 euros each year. Since 1996 the prize has been given to an individual for their work in literary criticism, and since 2004 has taken place at the Leipzig Book Fair.

The jury consists of Prof Klaus Reichert (Honorary President of the German Academy for Language and Literature), Dr. Maria Gazzetti (Manager of the Poetic Literature Foundation ), Peter Härtling (author), Klaus Schöffling (publisher), Torsten Casimir (financial newspaper chief), and Michael Lemling (Managing Director of the Munich bookstore Lehmkuhl).

== Award winners ==
- 1978: Jürgen Lodemann
- 1982: Otto Breicha
- 1988: Dieter P. Meier-Lenz
- 1992: Volker Ullrich
- 1993: Werner Liersch
- 1996: Hanns Grössel
- 1997: Paul Ingendaay
- 1998: Günther Ohnemus
- 1999: Andreas Nentwich
- 2000: Lothar Müller
- 2001: Ulrich Weinzierl
- 2002: Maike Albath
- 2003: Felicitas von Lovenberg
- 2004: Elmar Krekeler
- 2005: Hubert Spiegel
- 2006: Meike Feßmann
- 2007: Hubert Winkels
- 2008: Burkhard Müller
- 2009: Gregor Dotzauer
- 2010: Dorothea von Törne
- 2011: Ina Hartwig
- 2012: Helmut Böttiger
- 2013: Daniela Strigl
- 2014: Insa Wilke
- 2015: Manfred Papst
- 2016: Nico Bleutge
- 2017: Andreas Breitenstein
- 2018: Michael Braun
- 2019: Marie Schmidt
- 2020: Christian Metz
- 2021: Roman Bucheli
- 2022: not awarded
- 2023: Jutta Person
- 2024: Wolfgang Matz
- 2025: Beate Tröger
- 2026: Dietmar Dath
