= Thomas Hürlimann =

Swiss playwright and novelist

Thomas Hürlimann (born 21 December 1950) is a Swiss playwright and novelist.

== Biography ==
Hürlimann was born in Zug, Switzerland. He is a son of the former government and federal councilor (Minister) Hans Hürlimann. He studied philosophy in Zürich and Berlin, worked as an assistant director and dramaturge at the Berlin Schiller Theater and was a guest lecturer at the German Institute for Literature in Leipzig. His 1989 novel das Gartenhaus was published as The Couple in the United States in 1991. His works have been translated into 21 languages.

== Works ==
Selected works include:

=== Prosa ===
- Die Tessinerin (1981), ISBN 978-3-596-03379-9
- Das Gartenhaus (1989), ISBN 3-250-60050-4
- Die Satellitenstadt (1992), ISBN 3-250-10178-8
- Carleton (1996)
- Das Holztheater (1997), ISBN 3-250-60001-6
- Die Lawine (1998)
- Fräulein Stark (2001)
- Himmelsöhi, hilf! Über die Schweiz und andere Nester (2002), ISBN 3-250-30010-1
- Vierzig Rosen (2006), ISBN 978-3-10-031921-0
- Der Sprung in den Papierkorb. Geschichten, Gedanken und Notizen am Rand (2008), ISBN 978-3-250-60125-8
- Dämmerschoppen. Geschichten aus 30 Jahren (2009), ISBN 978-3-250-10801-6
- Nietzsches Regenschirm. (2015), ISBN 978-3-596-03599-1
- Heimkehr (2018), ISBN 978-3-10-031557-1
- Der rote Diamant (2022), ISBN 978-3-104-91359-9

=== Theater ===
- Grossvater und Halbbruder (1981)
- Der letzte Gast (1990)
- Der Gesandte (1991)
- De Franzos im Ybrig (1991)
- Güdelmäntig (1993)
- Vierzig Rosen (2006)
- Der Sprung in den Papierkorb (2008)

== Awards ==
- 1981 Aspekte-Literaturpreis for Die Tessinerin
- 1992 Marieluise-Fleisser-Preis
- 1997 Literaturpreis der Konrad-Adenauer-Stiftung
- 1998 Solothurner Literaturpreis
- 2001 Joseph Breitbach Prize
- 2007 Schillerpreis
- 2008 Caroline-Schlegel-Preis
- 2011 Thomas Mann Prize
- 2014 Alemannischer Literaturpreis
- 2019 Gottfried-Keller-Preis

=== Honorary doctorates ===
- 2016 University of Basel

=== Memberships ===
- Member of the Bayerische Akademie der Schönen Künste
- Member of the Deutsche Akademie für Sprache und Dichtung
- Member of the Academy of Arts, Berlin
