= Buchmarkt =

German magazine

BuchMarkt
- Categories: Book trade
- Frequency: monthly
- Circulation: 4700
- Publisher: BuchMarkt Verlag K. Werner
- Country: Germany
- Language: German
- Website: www.buchmarkt.de

Buchmarkt (stylized as BuchMarkt, English: Book market) is an independent specialist magazine founded in 1966 for the German-language book trade. It is published monthly, usually on the first Tuesday of the month. The subtitle of the magazine is Das Ideenmagazin für den Buchhandel (English: The ideas magazine for the book trade).

== History ==
In 1966, the idea arose to publish an independent specialist magazine for the German-language book trade. On 10 May 1966, Klaus Werner, Eberhardt Dickert and Christian von Zittwitz founded the publishing house Junge Edition K. Werner GmbH for this purpose. The name was later changed to Buchmarkt Verlag K. Werner GmbH. The first issue was presented in 1966 at the Frankfurt Book Fair.

In the beginning, Buchmarkt was published in two editions, but increased every year. In 1967, there were already four issues, in 1968 six, eight the following year, ten in 1970; and since 1971 Buchmarkt has been published monthly.

Christian von Zittwitz is now the sole shareholder and in 1997 relocated the company's headquarters from Düsseldorf to Meerbusch-Ilverich. Since 1998, there is also been an online offer of Buchmarkt. In 2006, the magazine celebrated its 40th birthday with an anniversary edition: industry highlights from 40 years of Buchmarkt.

In 2009, Christian von Zittwitz was the first journalist ever to receive the golden pin of honor from the Börsenverein des Deutschen Buchhandels.

== Initiatives ==
The "Buchmarkt AWARD" has been presented annually at the Leipzig Book Fair since 2000. The award is a cooperation between Buchmarkt, Leipzig Book Fair, Spiegel, Die Welt and Mohn Media.

Every year since 2003, Buchmarkt has honored the "Bookstore of the Year": a company in the German-speaking region that offers competent advice, a balanced range of goods, imaginative presentation and good marketing as well as economic success.

== Cooperations ==
Since 2005, there has been a cooperation between Buchmarkt and Uni-online: Buchmarkt-College, an educational portal for the book trade.

The BuchmarktFORUM has existed since 2000, a cooperation between Buchmarkt and HypoVereinsbank, which is intended to support an exchange of information between publishers and bookstores.

== Publisher of the year ==
Since 1994, Buchmarkt has been awarding a "Publisher of the year" prize. The winners were:

- 1994: Marcel Nauer (arsEdition)
- 1995: Michael Krüger (Carl Hanser Verlag)
- 1996: Lothar Menne
- 1997: Christian Strasser (Pendo Verlag)
- 1998: Viktor Niemann (Piper Verlag)
- 1999: Gottfried Honnefelder
- 2000: Wolfgang Balk (Deutscher Taschenbuch Verlag)
- 2001: Thomas Carl Schwoerer (Campus Verlag)
- 2002: Monika Thaler (Frederking & Thaler)
- 2003: Friedrich-Karl Sandmann (Zabert Sandmann Verlag)
- 2004: Karl Blessing (Karl Blessing Verlag)
- 2005: Helge Malchow (Kiepenheuer & Witsch)
- 2006: Antje Kunstmann (Verlag Antje Kunstmann)
- 2007: Claudia Baumhöver (Der Hörverlag)
- 2008: Monika Schoeller (S. Fischer Verlag)
- 2009: Klaus Humann (Carlsen Verlag)
- 2010: Ulrich Genzler (Heyne Verlag)
- 2011: Wolfgang Beck (Verlag C.H. Beck)
- 2012: Lothar Schirmer (Schirmer/Mosel Verlag)
- 2013: Hans-Peter Übleis (Droemer Knaur)
- 2014: Georg Reuchlein (Luchterhand Literaturverlag)
- 2015: Lucien Leitess (Unionsverlag)
- 2016: Klaus Schöffling (Schöffling & Co.)
- 2017: Andreas Rötzer (Matthes & Seitz Berlin)
- 2018: Susanne Schüssler (Verlag Klaus Wagenbach)
- 2019: Christoph Links (Ch. Links Verlag)
- 2020: Thedel von Wallmoden
- 2021: Regina Kammerer (btb, Luchterhand Literaturverlag)

== See also ==
- Börsenblatt
- Buchreport
