= Burkhard Spinnen =

German author (born 1956)

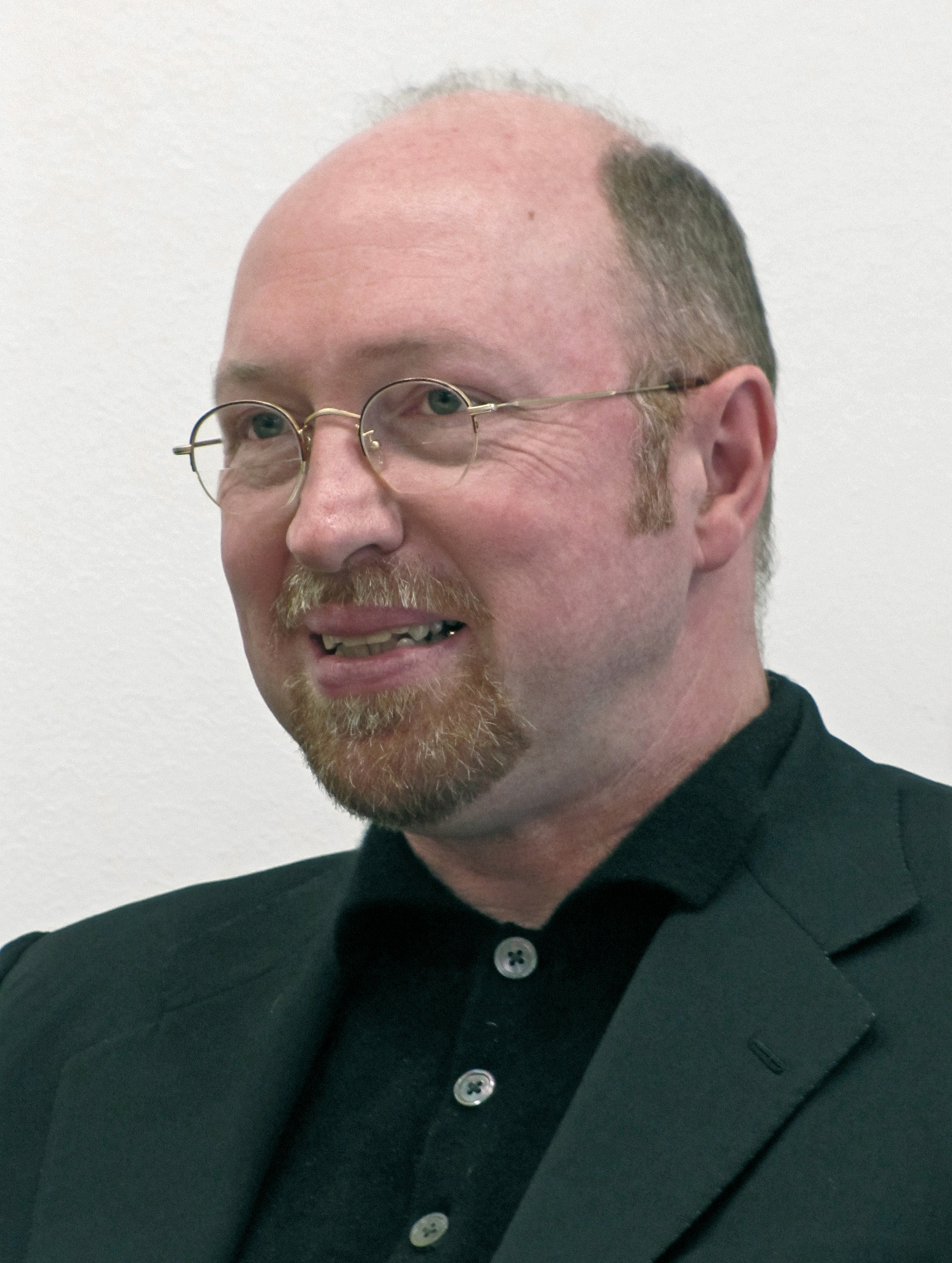
Spinnen in 2010

Burkhard Spinnen (born December 28, 1956, in Mönchengladbach) is a German author.

== Education and early life ==
Spinnen grew up in Mönchengladbach as the only child of Willy and Cornelia Spinnen. After completing his secondary education and his military service in 1976, he studied Mass communication, Sociology and German Studies at the University of Münster, completing his master's degree in 1984 and then his doctorate in the Faculty of Philosophy in 1989.

Following his studies, he worked at the Institute for German Studies as an Assistant until 1995 after which, from 1996 onward, he decided to become a freelance writer.

== Career as a writer ==
Burkhard Spinnen is a member of PEN Centre Germany. From 1997 to 2000 he was guest professor at the Deutsches Literaturinstitut in Leipzig. From 2000 to 2006 he was a member of the Jury of the Klagenfurt-based Ingeborg-Bachmann-Prize, and from 2008 to 2014 the Jury Chairman. Since 2011 he has been a member of the prestigious North Rhine-Westphalian Academy of Sciences, Humanities and the Arts.

As well as writing novels, short stories, essays and criticism, Spinnen writes reviews and opinion pieces for the newspapers and radio. Spinnen has received numerous awards for his work.

== Family life ==
Spinnen has lived in Münster since 1996 as a freelance writer. He is married with two sons. In 2016 he published a frank account of his mother’s gradual decline into dementia.

== Awards ==
- 1991 Aspekte-Literaturpreis for Dicker Mann im Meer
- 1992 Kärntner Industrie Prize of the Ingeborg-Bachmann-Prize
- 1996 Märkisches Stipendium für Literatur
- 1996 Kranichsteiner Literaturpreis
- 1999 Literaturpreis der Konrad-Adenauer-Stiftung
- 2001 Oldenburger Kinder- und Jugendbuchpreis for Belgische Riesen
- 2002 Mindener Stadtschreiber-Stipendium
- 2002 Caroline-Schlegel-Preis for his Essay Skandal
- 2003 Herbert-Quandt-Medien-Preis
- 2003 Commerce Book Prize of the Financial Times Deutschland
- 2004 Niederrheinischer Literaturpreis
- 2007 Deutscher Hörbuchpreis/German Audio Book Prize
- 2008 Rheinischer Literaturpreis Siegburg

== Works ==
- Die Münstermacher. Eine satirische Szene, Münster (1986)
- Eine Reise durch das Buch. Ein Stück für das Schultheater, Münster (1988)
- Zeitalter der Aufklebung. Versuch zur Schriftkultur der Gegenwart, Münster (1990)
- Dicker Mann im Meer (Short stories) Schöffling & Co. Verlag, Frankfurt am Main (1991)
- Schriftbilder. Studien zu einer Geschichte emblematischer Kurzprosa, Münster (1991)
- Kalte Ente, Geschichten, Schöffling & Co. Verlag, Frankfurt am Main (1994)
- Langer Samstag, Roman, Schöffling & Co. Verlag, Frankfurt am Main (1995)
- Trost und Reserve, Schöffling & Co. Verlag, Frankfurt am Main (1996)
- Modelleisenbahn, München (1998)
- Belgische Riesen (Novel for children aged 9 upwards) Schöffling & Co. Verlag, Frankfurt am Main (2000) ISBN 978-3-8956-1034-9
- Bewegliche Feiertage. Essays und Reden (Essays and speeches) Schöffling & Co. Verlag, Frankfurt am Main (2000) ISBN 978-3-89561-035-6
- Der schwarze Grat. Die Geschichte des Unternehmers Walter Lindenmaier aus Laupheim (Biography) Schöffling & Co. Verlag, Frankfurt am Main (2003) ISBN 978-3-89561-037-0
- Lego-Steine. Kindheit um 1968 (Autobiography) Schöffling & Co. Verlag, Frankfurt am Main (2004) ISBN 978-3-89561-039-4
- Der Reservetorwart (Short stories) Schöffling & Co. Verlag, Frankfurt am Main (2004) ISBN 978-3-89561-040-0
- Klarsichthüllen. Ein Dialog über Sprache in der modernen Wirtschaft (Non-fiction) Carl Hanser Verlag, München (2005) ISBN 978-3-446-40316-1
- Kram und Würde (Critical essays) Schöffling & Co. Verlag, Frankfurt am Main (2006) ISBN 978-3-89561-041-7
- Mehrkampf (Novel) Schöffling & Co. Verlag, Frankfurt am Main (2007) ISBN 978-3-89561-042-4
- Gut aufgestellt. Kleiner Phrasenführer durch die Wirtschaftssprache (Guide to business terminology) Verlag Herder, Freiburg (2008). ISBN 978-3-451-05961-2
- Müller hoch Drei (Novel for children aged 10 upwards) Schöffling & Co. Verlag, Frankfurt am Main (2009) ISBN 978-3-89561-043-1
- Auswärtslesen. Mit Literatur in die Schule (Non-fiction) Residenz Verlag, Salzburg (2010) ISBN 978-3-7017-1548-0
- Nevena (Novel) Schöffling & Co. Verlag, Frankfurt am Main (2012) ISBN 978-3-89561-044-8
- Am Ende des Tages (Essays on language) Verlag Herder, Freiburg (2014) ISBN 978-3-451-30933-5
- Zacharias Katz (Novel), Schöffling & Co. Verlag, Frankfurt am Main (2014) ISBN 978-3-89561-045-5
- Die letzte Fassade. Wie meine Mutter dement wurde (Autobiographical) Verlag Herder, Freiburg (2016) ISBN 978-3-451-34774-0
- Hauptgewinn. Die Erzählungen (Collected short stories) Schöffling & Co. Verlag, Frankfurt am Main (2016) ISBN 978-3-89561-047-9
- Das Buch. Eine Hommage (Essay on the future of the book) Schöffling & Co. Verlag, Frankfurt am Main (2016) ISBN 978-3-89561-046-2
