= Marica Bodrožić =

German writer

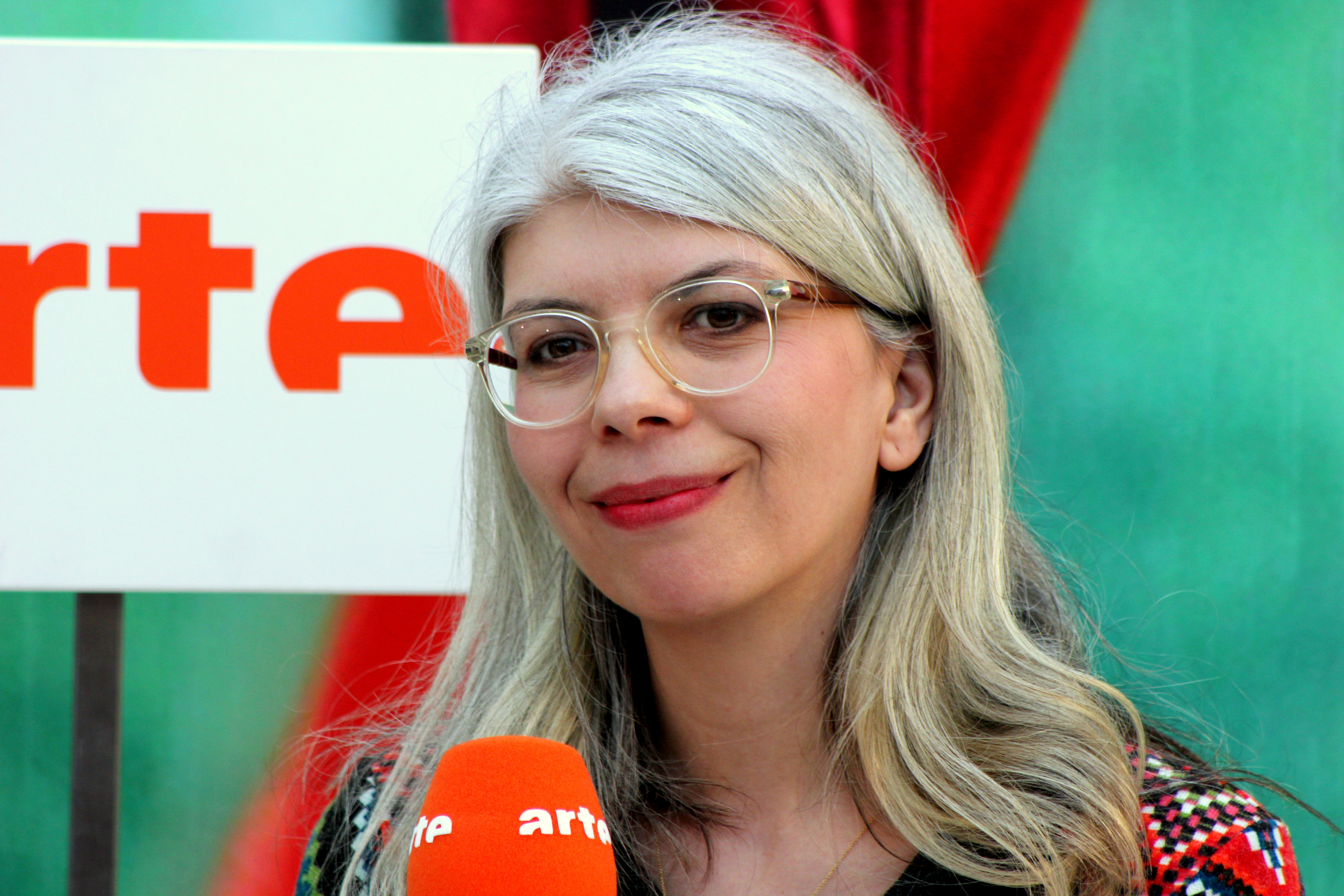
Marica Bodrožić (2015)

Marica Bodrožić (born 1973) is a German writer of Croatian descent. She was born in Svib in Cista Provo, Croatia in the former Yugoslavia. She moved to Germany as a child and currently lives in Berlin.

Bodrožić writes primarily in the German language. She is fluent in multiple genres, including essays, novels, poems, and stories. She has worked as a literary translator and a teacher of creative writing. One of her best known works is the novel Kirschholz und alte Gefühle (A Cherrywood Table) which received the EU Prize for Literature. The novel has been translated into Italian by Stefano Zangrando for Mimesis (2017).

In 2017, Marica Bodrožić signed the Declaration on the Common Language of the Croats, Serbs, Bosniaks and Montenegrins.

== Works ==
- Bodrožić, Marica (2002). Tito ist tot : Erzählungen (in German). Frankfurt am Main: Suhrkamp. ISBN 3-518-41308-2. OCLC 50476835.
- —— (2005). Der Spieler der inneren Stunde : Roman (in German). Frankfurt am Main: Suhrkamp. ISBN 3-518-41665-0. OCLC 58422044.
- —— (2007). Sterne erben, Sterne färben : meine Ankunft in Wörtern (in German). Frankfurt am Main: Suhrkamp. ISBN 978-3-518-12506-9. OCLC 122260148.
- —— (2007). Ein Kolibri kam unverwandelt : Gedichte (in German). Salzburg: Otto Müller. ISBN 978-3-7013-1126-2. OCLC 84611665.
- —— (2007). Der Windsammler : Erzählungen (in German). Frankfurt am Main: Suhrkamp. ISBN 978-3-518-41914-4. OCLC 173842772.
- —— (2008). Lichtorgeln : Gedichte (in German). Salzburg: Otto Müller. ISBN 978-3-7013-1155-2. OCLC 237882516.
- —— (2010). Das Gedächtnis der Libellen Roman (in German). München. ISBN 978-3-630-87334-3. OCLC 695926645.
- —— (2011). Quittenstunden : Gedichte (in German). Salzburg: O. Müller. ISBN 978-3-7013-1181-1. OCLC 709663370.
- —— (2014). Kirschholz und alte Gefühle Roman (in German). München. ISBN 978-3-442-74752-8. OCLC 865140744.
- —— (2014). Mein weisser Frieden (in German). München. ISBN 978-3-630-87394-7. OCLC 892336710.
- —— (2015). Das Auge hinter dem Auge : Betrachtungen (in German). Salzburg. ISBN 978-3-7013-1235-1. OCLC 920452142.
- —— (2016). Das Wasser unserer Träume : Roman (in German). München. ISBN 978-3-630-87396-1. OCLC 959226508.
- ——; Mechthild of Magdeburg (2018). Die Wahrheit kann niemand verbrennen : über die Blickrichtung der Liebe bei Mechthild von Magdeburg (in German). Heidelberg. ISBN 978-3-88423-581-2. OCLC 1031435343.
- —— (2019). Poetische Vernunft im Zeitalter gusseiserner Begriffe Essays (in German). Berlin: MSB Matthes & Seitz Berlin Verlagsgesellschaft. ISBN 978-3-95757-727-6. OCLC 1076505985.
- —— (2021). Pantherzeit : vom Innenmass der Dinge (in German). Salzburg. ISBN 978-3-7013-1287-0. OCLC 1241661572.
- —— (2022). Die Arbeit der Vögel : Seelenstenogramme (in German). München. ISBN 978-3-630-87594-1. OCLC 1321951076.

=== Italian translations ===
- Bodrožić, Marica; Zangrando, Stefano (2017). Il tavolo di ciliegio : romanzo (in Italian). Milano: Mimesis. ISBN 978-88-575-3986-7. OCLC 1080494323.

== Awards ==
Bodrožić's awards include:

- 2013 Kranichsteiner Literaturpreis
- 2015 European Union Prize for Literature
- 2015 Literaturpreis der Konrad-Adenauer-Stiftung
- 2021 Walter-Hasenclever-Literaturpreis
- 2022 Chamisso-Poetikdozentur, Dresden

=== Memberships ===
- PEN Centre Germany
