= Börsenblatt =

German newspaper

Börsenblatt – Wochenmagazin für den Deutschen Buchhandel
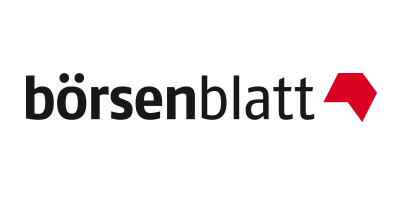
- Fachzeitschrift für den deutschen Buchhandel
- Type: Book trade
- Publisher: MVB GmbH, Frankfurt a. M.; Börsenverein des Deutschen Buchhandels
- Editor-in-chief: Torsten Casimir
- General manager: Ronald Schild
- Founded: January 3, 1834; 191 years ago
- Language: German
- Circulation: 7000 (weekly) (IVW)
- ISSN: 1611-4280
- Website: https://www.boersenblatt.net/

The "Börsenblatt – Wochenmagazin für den Deutschen Buchhandel" (English: Weekly magazine for the German book trade), until 2002 "Börsenblatt für den Deutschen Buchhandel" (English: Trade exchange newspaper for the German book trade), is the association organ of the Börsenverein des Deutschen Buchhandels. The publication, founded in 1834, is the magazine with the highest number of advertisements and circulation in the German book selling trade. It came out once a week, later twice a week, and even daily for many years. The Börsenblatt is published by the Marketing- und Verlagsservice des Buchhandels (English: Marketing and publishing service of the book trade). It informs the professional audience as well as private readers about news on the book market. Since January 2013, the specialist magazine has been published in weekly alternation as the "Börsenblatt Magazin" and the "Börsenblatt Spezial". The Börsenblatt Spezial highlights the trends within the various product groups. Current industry reports are published on the magazine's homepage.

The Börsenblatt publishes various bestseller lists, including an audio book best list, a non-fiction best list, a bestseller lists with the best-selling titles from fiction and non-fiction as well as, since spring 2018, the independent charts of publications from smaller, independent publishers.

The Börsenblatt's editor-in-chief is Torsten Casimir, who previously headed Feuilleton of the Rheinische Post.

== History ==
The Börsenverein der Deutschen Buchhändler zu Leipzig founded the Börsenblatt in 1834. From the year 1835 on, it became the property of the Börsenverein and now bore the designation "Amtliches Blatt des Börsenvereins" (English: Official newspaper of the stock exchange association) on its title page. Since the beginning of 1835, B. G. Teubner at Augustusplatz in Leipzig took over the printing. At first, the Börsenblatt appeared weekly, but then changed to daily from 1867. In 1945, the Börsenblatt was temporarily discontinued.

In the Western zones of Allied-occupied Germany, the paper appeared under the same title (or Börsenblatt für den Deutschen Buchhandel) with the addition "Frankfurter Ausgabe" (English: Frankfurt Edition) from 1945. Since 1946, Börsenblatt was again published weekly in the Soviet zone of occupation.

In 1990, the two Börsenblatt publications were issued separately for the last time (Leipzig: 157th year). Since the merger of the two Börsenvereine on 1 January 1991 only one Börsenblatt has been published each week. The Leipzig mode of counting volumes was adopted.

In April 2020, the Saxon State and University Library Dresden (SLUB) made the years 1834 to 1945 available as full text free of charge.

== Awards ==
In 1977, the Börsenblatt founded the Alfred-Kerr-Preis for Literary Criticism, which is awarded annually.

== See also ==
- BuchMarkt
- buchreport
- Archiv für Geschichte des Buchwesens
