= Ina Hartwig =

German journalist and author

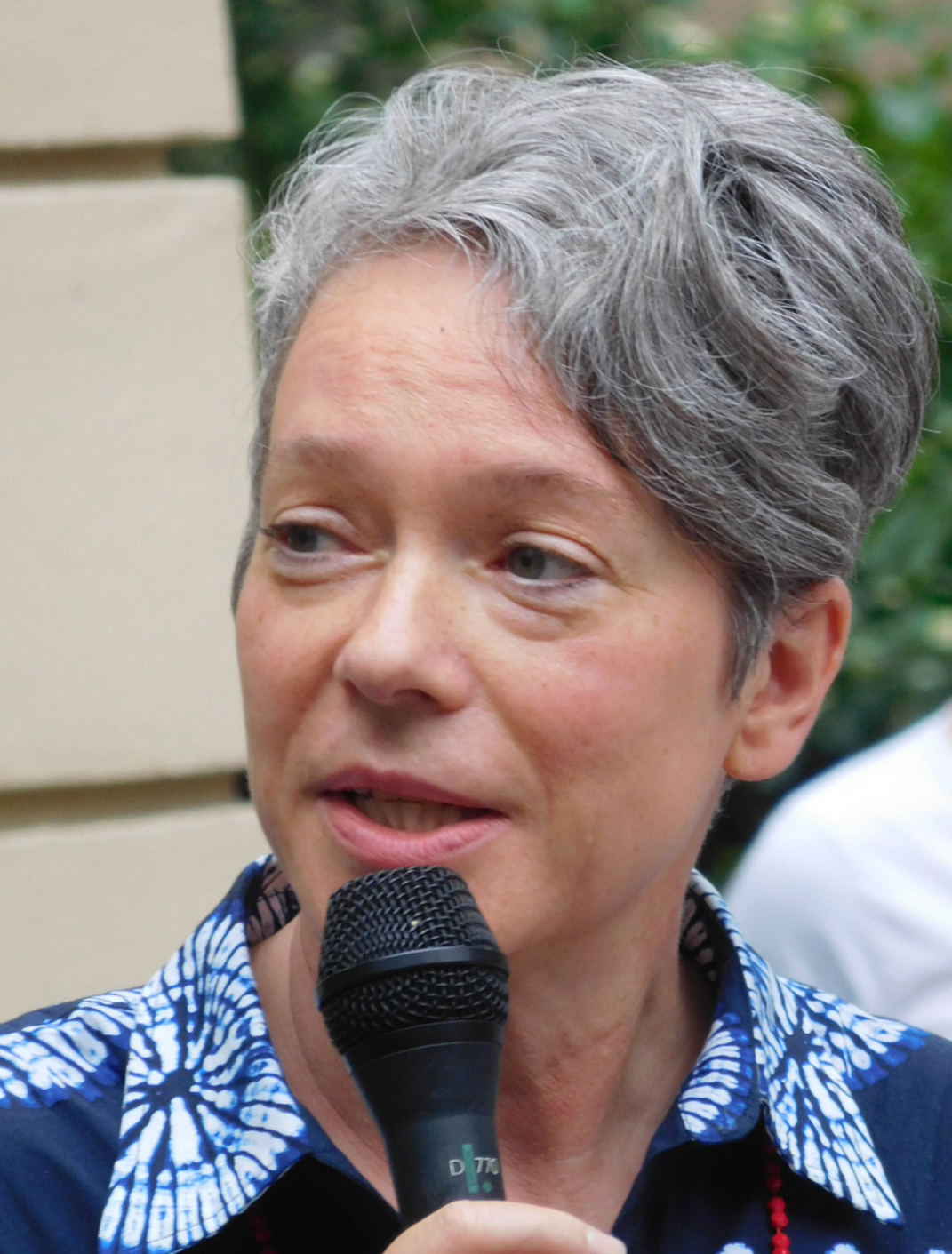
- Hartwig at the bicentenary of the Städelschule in Frankfurt, 2017
- Born: 11 July 1963 (age 63); Hamburg
- Occupations: Writer; Literature critic; Academic lecturer; Cultural politician
- Organizations: FU Berlin; Frankfurter Rundschau
- Awards: Alfred-Kerr-Preis; Caroline-Schlegel-Preis

Ina Hartwig (born 11 July 1963) is a German writer, literature critic and academic lecturer. From July 2016, she has been Kulturdezernentin in Frankfurt, the city councillor responsible for culture and science.

== Early life and education ==
Hartwig was born in Hamburg, Germany, and went to school in Lüneburg. After the Abitur (transl. university-preparatory school graduation) in 1983 at the Gymnasium Oedeme, she studied romance studies and German studies at the University of Avignon and Free University of Berlin, graduating in 1990.

She then received her Ph.D. at the Universität Duisburg-Essen with a dissertation about Proust, Musil, Genet and Elfriede Jelinek.

== Career ==
Hartwig started her career teaching at the Free University of Berlin. In 1997, she moved to Frankfurt am Main as a journalist of the Frankfurter Rundschau, where she was a features editor from 1999 to 2009. She was, together with Tilman Spengler, publisher of the journal Kursbuch from 2002 to 2004. She was a guest professor for literary criticism in St. Louis, US (2002), Göttingen (2007/08) and at the Deutsches Literaturinstitut in Leipzig (2014/15). In 2015/16, she was a Fellow at the Wissenschaftskolleg in Berlin.

From 2010 to 2016, she was a freelance author, critic and moderator, publishing in Süddeutsche Zeitung and Die Zeit, among others. She was a regular guest in the 3sat Kulturzeit (culture time), and was from 2013 to 2016 on the team of the literature series Buchzeit (book time). She served on the juries of the prize of Leipzig Book Fair and of German Book Prize, and from 2014 on the commission for the Goethe Medal of the Goethe Institute. She is a member of the PEN-Zentrum Deutschland. She was a co-author for the 2016 film Die Geträumten, directed by Ruth Beckermann, about Ingeborg Bachmann and Paul Celan. She published a biography of Bachmann, Wer war Ingeborg Bachmann?, in November 2017.

Hartwig has been a member of the Social Democratic Party of Germany (SPD) from 2012. She was elected Kulturdezernentin (transl. city councillor responsible for culture and science) in Frankfurt on 14 July 2016. When she took up the office she called for more experiments and alternative art forms. She also promoted collaboration with Frankfurt's sister cities, and critical public discussion of political topics. She reinstated free municipal museum visits for children under age 18. She is m member of the supervisory board of the Schirn Kunsthalle Frankfurt.

== Awards ==
- 2011: Alfred-Kerr-Preis for literary criticism
- 2011: Caroline-Schlegel-Preis of Jena

== Publications ==
- Sexuelle Poetik. Proust, Musil, Genet, Jelinek. S. Fischer, Frankfurt am Main 1998, ISBN 3-596-13959-7 (also: Essen University, Dissertation)
- Das Geheimfach ist offen. Über Literatur. S. Fischer, Frankfurt am Main 2012, ISBN 3-10-029103-4.
- Wer war Ingeborg Bachmann? Eine Biographie in Bruchstücken. S. Fischer, Frankfurt am Main 2017, ISBN 978-3-10-002303-2
