= German Literature Fund Grand Prize =

German literary award

Kranichsteiner Literaturpreis is a literary prize of Germany. The Deutscher Literaturfonds (German Literature Fund) based in Darmstadt has been awarding the prize since 1983. The prize money was raised in 2019 from €20,000 to €30,000. In addition to the main prize, the Kranichsteiner Literaturförderpreis is also awarded. In 2020, the Deutscher Literaturfonds renamed the prize to Großer Preis des Deutschen Literaturfonds (Grand Prize of the German Literature Fund) and the prize money has been raised to €50,000. It is awarded for an outstanding literary work.

== Recipients ==
=== Kranichsteiner Literaturpreis ===
- 1983: Rainald Goetz
- 1984: Adelheid Duvanel
- 1985: Helga M. Novak
- 1986: Anne Duden
- 1987: Wolfgang Hilbig
- 1988: Klaus Hensel
- 1989: Thomas Strittmatter
- 1990: Josef Winkler
- 1991: Herta Müller
- 1992: Ludwig Fels
- 1993: Jan Faktor
- 1995: Hansjörg Schertenleib
- 1996: Burkhard Spinnen
- 1997: Birgit Vanderbeke
- 1998: Thomas Meinecke
- 1999: Lutz Seiler
- 2001: Wilhelm Genazino
- 2002: Ralf Rothmann
- 2003: Reinhard Jirgl
- 2004: Peter Kurzeck
- 2005: Martin Mosebach
- 2006: Sibylle Lewitscharoff
- 2007: Paul Nizon
- 2008: Gerhard Falkner
- 2009: Gerd-Peter Eigner
- 2010: Anne Weber
- 2011: Jan Wagner
- 2012: Frank Schulz
- 2013: Marica Bodrožić
- 2014: David Wagner
- 2015: Esther Kinsky
- 2016: Ulrich Peltzer
- 2017: Nico Bleutge
- 2018: Thomas Lehr
- 2019: Nora Bossong

=== Großer Preis des Deutschen Literaturfonds ===
- 2020: Felicitas Hoppe
- 2021: Ulrike Draesner
- 2022: Georg Klein
- 2023: Annette Pehnt
- 2024: Martina Hefter
- 2025: Katerina Poladjan
