= Starlite Terrace =

2004 novel by Patrick Roth

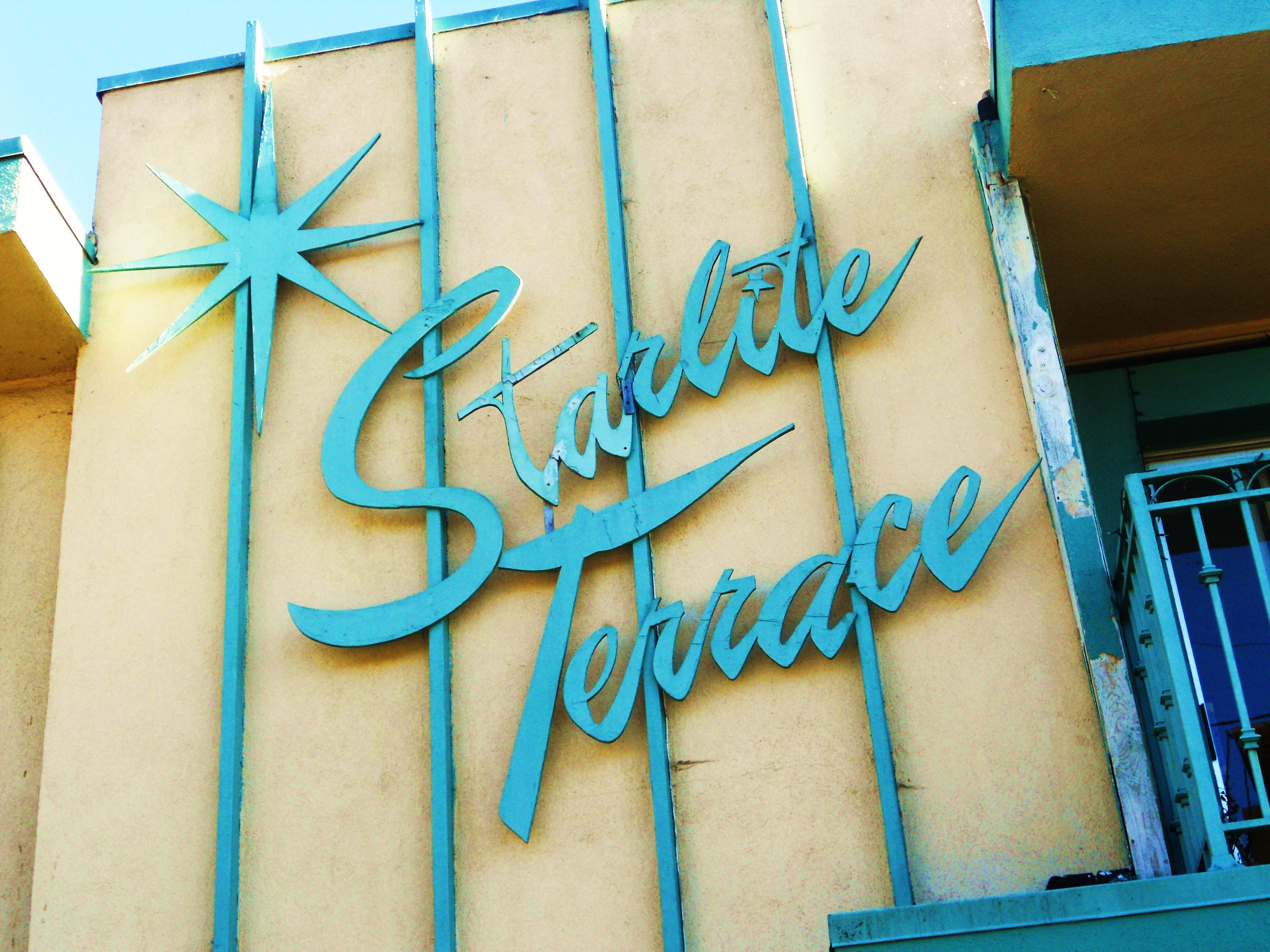
Lettering on the building

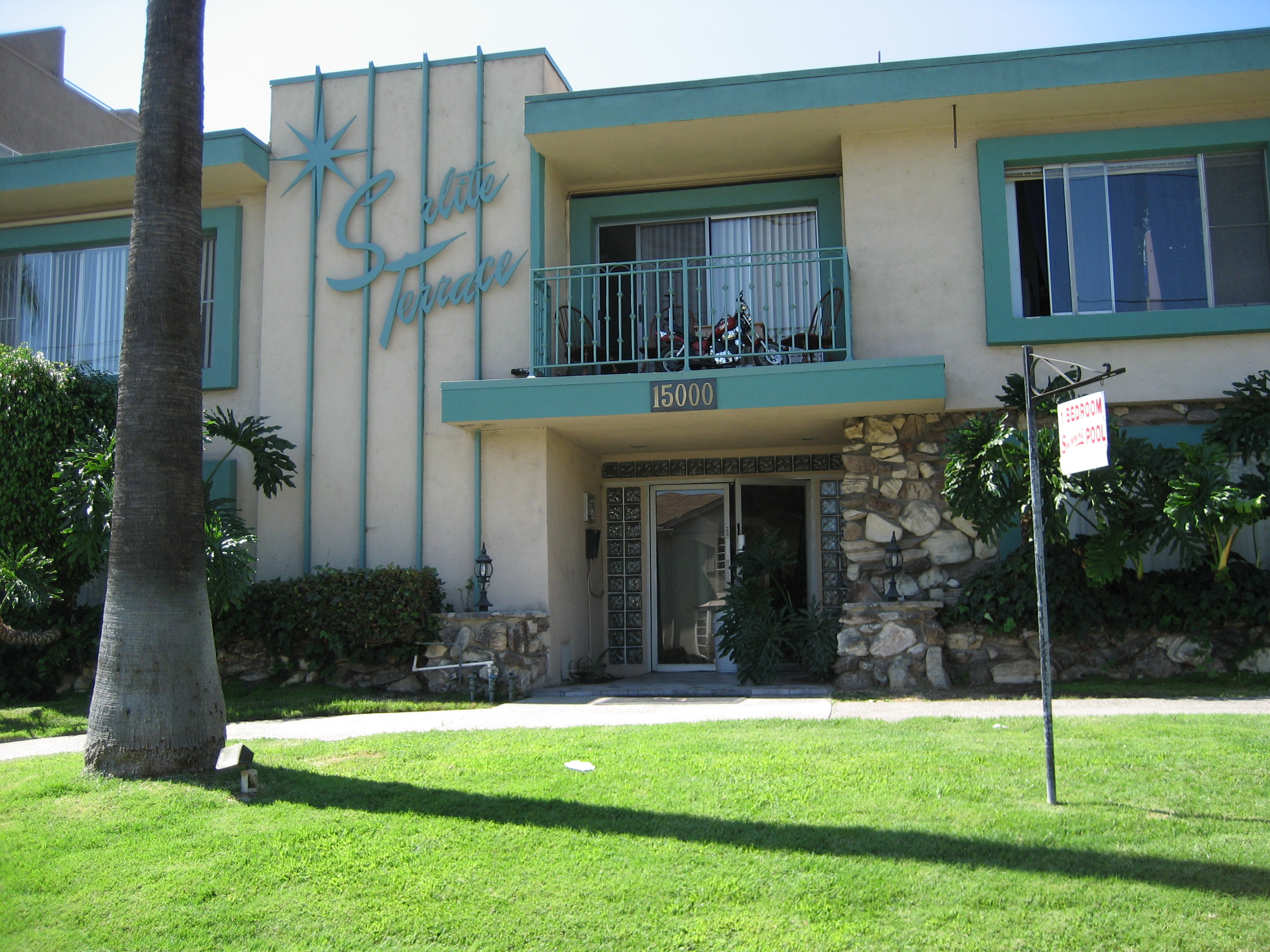
Starlite Terrace Apartments, Sherman Oaks, view from the street

Starlite Terrace is a contemporary novel in four stories about the American film milieu written by Patrick Roth, published by Seagull Books in 2012.

== Setting and structure ==
"Starlite Terrace" is the name of the Los Angeles apartment complex arranged around a swimming pool, where the plot unfolds in 2002 and 2003. Four tenants tell their Hollywood-tinged life stories to a fifth, who is also the main narrator (who remains nameless). Attracted by the glamour of show business, Rex, Moss, Gary and June had moved to the movie capital at a young age. In conversations with the narrator, they recount key events and turning points in their lives, great expectations and bitter disappointments. Their stories, mostly rendered as dialogues, revolve around love and guilt, death and redemption, existential themes, which find expression in archetypal images. Each narrative is based on biographical-historical facts embedded in a mythical-supra-temporal context. The author himself describes the narratives as fictionalized testimonies of people on the fringes of the American film and music industries, shaped and assembled into four "individuation stories".

The opening of the mundane everyday world into the mythical background of life gives the four stories the character of a novel. The anonymous narrator remains predominantly in the background of events in his role as an objective observer. Interspersed references to his person open up autobiographical references: his German origin, his extensive knowledge of film, and the narrative procedure of collecting slivers of life as material for dramatic stories point to an identity of author and narrator and identify Starlite Terrace as autofictional prose. "The Starlite Terrace narratives are part of Roth's own life story, a condensation of his forty-year experience with the film city Los Angeles, where he arrived in 1975 to study filmmaking at the University of Southern California (USC)."

The volume, which does not bear a genre designation, presents itself as a four-part narrative cycle that depicts a development in four stages or four narratives. The basic theme of transformation is already alluded to in the title. "Starlite Terrace" refers to an actual apartment building in Los Angeles and, at the same time, to the stepwise ascent to knowledge and a new consciousness. The four narratives that constitute the novel are linked by a variety of structural parallelisms and recurring motifs. Also it contains numerous direct and hidden references to film, the Bible, pop music and literature. The continuity of the overarching narrator figure, the central theme of film and movie stars, and the overall unity of place, time, and action weave the individual narratives into an organic body of work imbued with diagnostic power for the times.

== Plot ==
=== 1. The Man at Noah's Window ===
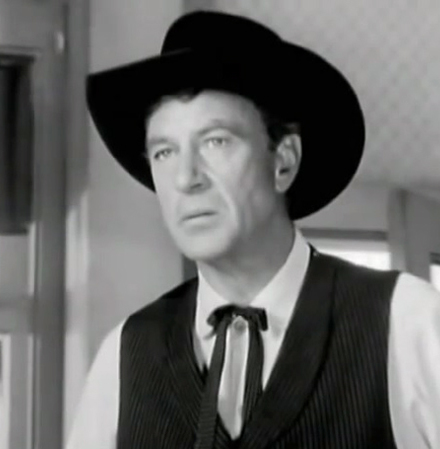
Rex adores Gary Cooper, seen here in "High Noon" (1952)

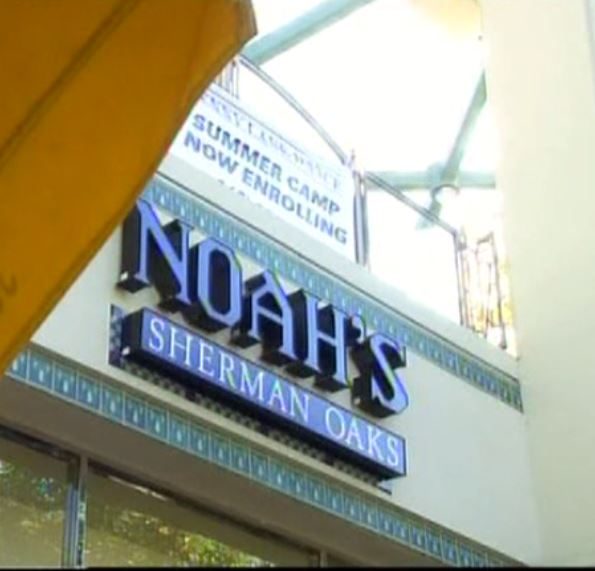
Noah's Deli in Sherman Oaks, the location where the story takes place

The first story revolves around the dying of old Rex. Over breakfast at "Noah's Deli", the former movie extra, who grew up without parents, reminisces about his childhood and youth, years that were illuminated only by the movies. Rex recounts that his father, a small shoe salesman with ostensibly beautiful hands, doubled Gary Cooper's hands during the filming of the western classic High Noon. As a young man, Rex had once stalked the star in the streets of Beverly Hills. Vainly, he attempted to shake the star's hand. The existential abandonment of the "man at Noah's window" becomes palpable in his nickname, "Rex Iudaeroum" (King of the Jews). This teasingly bestowed biblical title alludes to both demise and resurrection: Like Jesus on the cross, Rex, the "old king", dies a lonely, godforsaken death at the end of the narrative. Much like his idol Gary Cooper, he is dying of cancer. The narrator reproaches himself for not recognizing the signs of the approaching end:

And who, by the way, was Rex? What was he to me that I had listened to him for so long, had wanted to find the scenes containing the hands? [...] And what if I had listened to Rex that time at Noah's because I had a premonition that he was on the edge of the abyss? Not only that, but listened so closely, listened to Rex so breathlessly because I knew he was speaking of both himself and me. That it was my destiny being announced.

A dream by the narrator links the external events surrounding Rex to internal, biblical images. A "thrasing wind from the north" breaks into the window of the breakfast deli and tears the "man at Noah's window" with it, while the narrator seeks shelter in the adjacent room. Crouching on the floor in the darkness, he encounters the numinous figure of a "Überschreiter" (transcender), a "captive liberator" who strides over him into the open and rides away, whereupon the destructive storm subsides and calm returns. At last, the narrator steps out into the night, "into the wind, back to the Starlite Terrace."

=== 2. Solar Eclipse ===
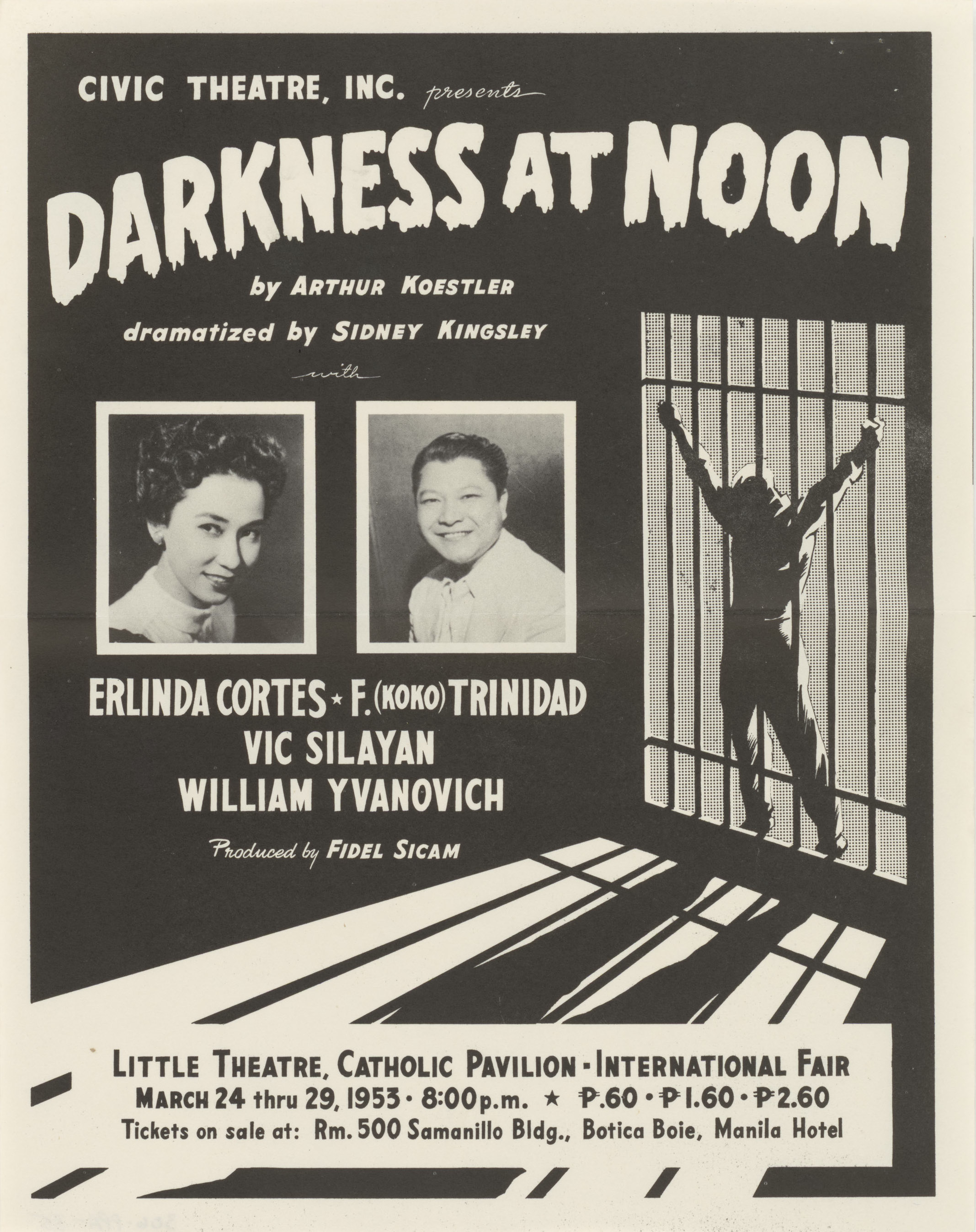
Moss acted as Rubashov, a victim of Stalin's secret police, in "Darkness at Noon", a stage adaptation of Arthur Koestler's famous novel (1940).

The second narrative focuses on the troubled life of Moss McCloud. A former actor and casting agent from New York, he struggles with the loss of his relationship to his only daughter, whose visit he expects any day now. The drama of the 40-year separation becomes acute again when he loses the manuscript of his life's story. The narrator accompanies his distraught neighbor as he searches for the lost script. In dialogue, Moss recalls scenes of his marriage from the first kiss at a stage rehearsal of Thornton Wilders play Our Town to the abrupt end three years later. The gamut of conflicting emotions of love and hate, anger and revenge, insight and abandonment is reflected in a breathlessly associative monologue. Narratively, Moss gathers together the fragments of the relationship, becoming aware of the larger factor behind his life. At the height of the conflict, this Other had appeared to him as a vision in the reflecting window of a bank building, ready to pour out his "vessel of anger". By the end of his wanderings, his search for the manuscript, Moss finds what he had lost on another plane:

By now it was completely dark. Moss and I were standing in the unlit alley behind the shops on Ventura Boulevard. We had long since given up the search. But Moss had dragged me along, drawing me deeper into his story with every word, holding me captive. He had spoken to me as if every word were testimony. And now — I could see it as he finished speaking — they were standing before him, the woman and his daughter. He had them back.

Solar Eclipse is designed as a frame story. The first-person narrator functions in the role of mediator and therapist, guiding the cognitive process through presence and empathy. At the end, the narrative levels intertwine in a metafictional gesture when Moss places his story in the hands of the narrator and instructs him to pass it on to posterity as his personal legacy.

=== 3. Rider on the Storm ===
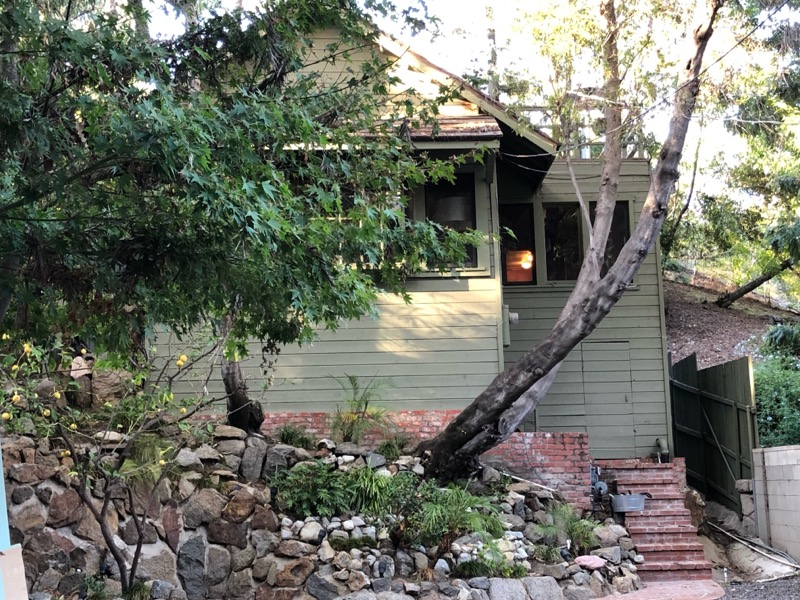
Laurel Canyon, 8217 Lookout Mountain Avenue, Joni Mitchell's home from 1969 to 1974

The Iraq War forms the contemporary historical background of the third story. It depicts Gary, an unsuccessful drummer and member of the Christian fundamentalist community "Keepers of the Flame". Influenced by the drug and hippie culture of the 1960s, he wants to rebuild his guilt-ridden life and seeks forgiveness from a young actress with whom he has newly fallen in love. He conquers his fractious temper with marijuana, his tendency to violent outbursts with a gun he secretly carries in his pocket. With his stories about the music scene of the sixties, he lures the narrator on a car trip to Laurel Canyon. As they drive by the homes of legends like Joni Mitchell, Frank Zappa and John Mayall, Gary describes episodes from his life. The bright beginning as drummer with The Turtles and the marriage with a Beatles groupie were followed by his exit from the band shortly before their hit Happy Together, his divorce and a steady descent into depression:

"Forty days of flood — that's what your Armenian buddy was describing. You know, sometimes I have the feeling I've been up to my neck in water for forty years. Always close to drowning. Never having firm ground under my feet... I'm fifty years old, man! And what do I have to show for it? Zilch."

With the narrator as listener, Gary confesses his misconduct and transgressions with women and family. The destination of the car ride turns out to be a party in the Hollywood Hills, where he expects to join up with the woman he longs to start over with. The narrator witnesses Gary mingling with the guests, wandering through the backyard in the pouring rain, a gun at the ready. The final image shows him at the bottom of a gazebo, drawn to an open fire, reaching into it with his hands. The motif of hand-clasped burning logs alludes to the beginning of the narrative, when the Armenian Ara recalls his first film experience among friends: a 50s low budget swords-and-sandals movie, centered around the biblical Flood, tells of a man, Ur, a contemporary of Noah's, and his love for his wife. After an encounter with a magician, Ur's wife is transformed and smuggled into the saving ark. During the ordeal in the fiery floods, Ur clings to the exterior planks of the ark. Through a crevice, the couple is able to hold contact, never taking their eyes off one another.

=== 4. The Woman in the Sea of Stars ===
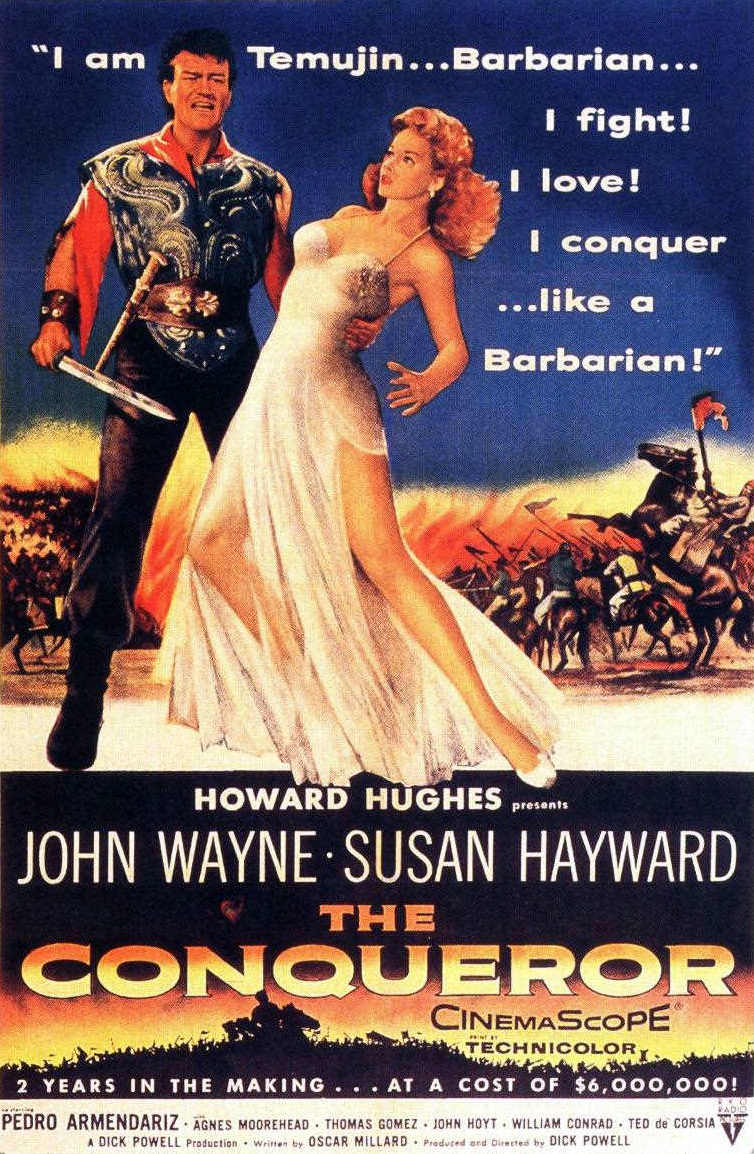
"The Conqueror", (1956); the exterior shooting took place near the Nevada Test Site about 65 miles (105 km) northwest of the city of Las Vegas.

The fourth story and final narrative step, The Woman in the Sea of Stars, shows the narrator alone among women. The narrator's opening dream — about an unknown woman lying poolside as she sketches a section of the cosmos into a black book — has the effect of freeing him from a fever. June, the long-divorced manager of the "Starlite Terrace" is of German descent and the only female heroine in the book. Her niece Jennifer, a storyboard artist, is visiting with her. The three of them sit together in the courtyard of the "Starlite" while The Conqueror, a 1950s movie starring John Wayne, plays on a TV monitor in the background.

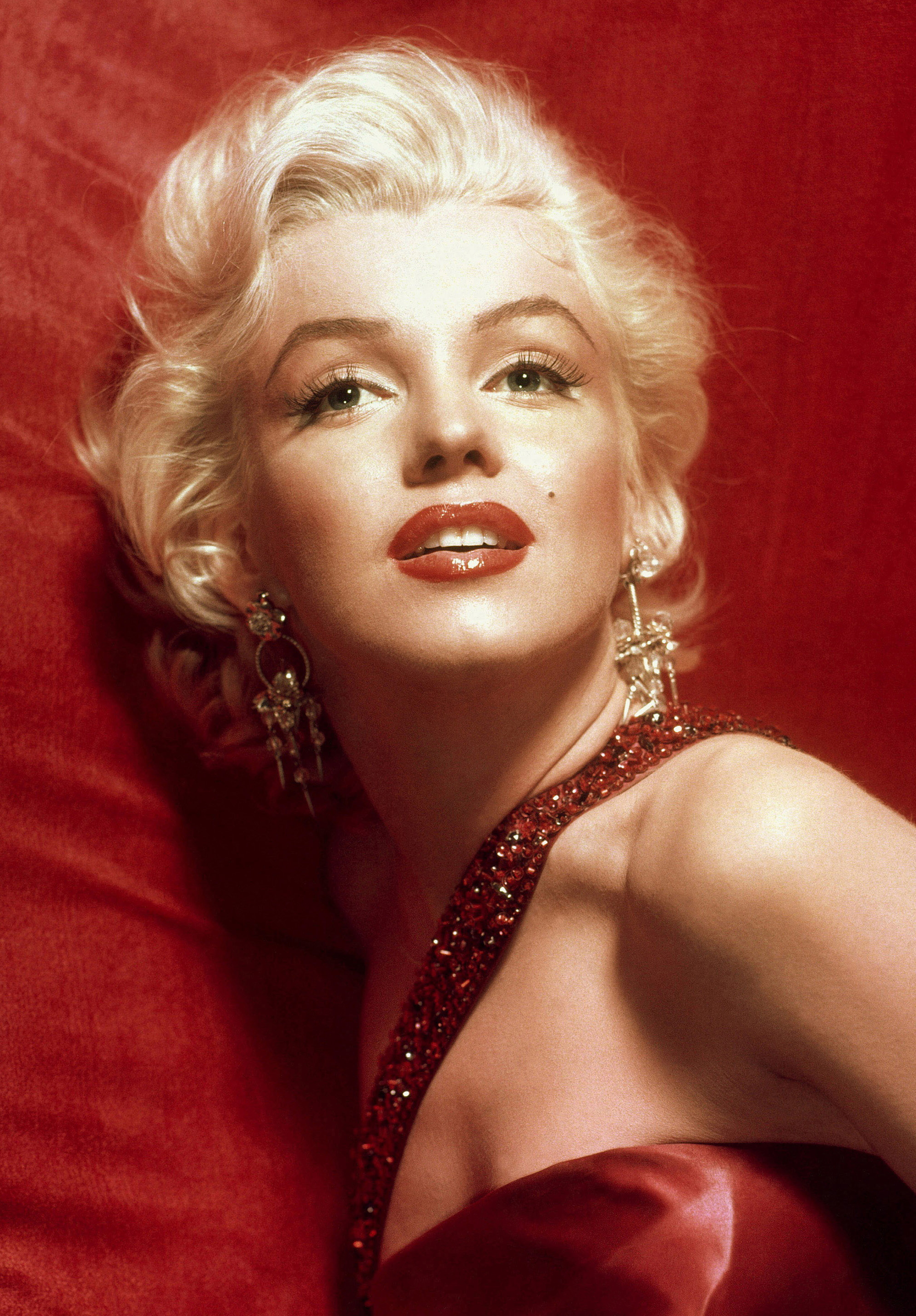
Marilyn Monroe 1953; June knows all the stories about her.

June, who shares her birthday and ex-husband with Marilyn Monroe, talks about her time as a secretary at Disney and 20th Century Fox. The glamorous names of studio bosses and movie gods are associated not only with abuse of power and sexual coercion, but also with death and crime. Whether it's the radioactively contaminated filming location in the Nevada desert, which also became Wayne's undoing, the Mafia execution of Las Vegas founder and godfather Bugsy Siegel through the window of a Beverly Hills mansion, or the alleged suicide of Marilyn Monroe involving the Kennedy brothers - June is aware of the dark underbelly of the dream factory. She herself is completely absorbed in the lives of those in the spotlight:

She fell silent for a moment. Maybe she realized she was going around in circles. That Marilyn's name and all the names and happenings of which she was speaking, as though they were timeless — for that was the undertone whenever June talked about the stars — were forcing her into a fateful circle, never letting her reach the center.

Only the memory of her encounter with the holocaust brings June back to herself. At Columbia, she had the task of logging film footage, of translating images into words. What was revealed "shot by shot" was the horror of extermination captured on camera by the liberators of the concentration camps in the spring of 1945. June then tells of her father, who had been abandoned as a child by his father, an immigrant German Jew.

At the end of the evening, coinciding with her 77th birthday, June symbolically reunites the torn family ties in the courtyard of the "Starlite Terrace". She pours the ashes of her unknown grandfather into the pool and jumps in. The narrator, who witnesses the spontaneous ritual from the pool's edge, poetically renders the union taking place within the ancestral ashes in the cosmic imagery of a marriage: "With three or four powerful kicks June reached the bottom [of the pool] and groped along, more slowly now, through the sparkling threads of ash as they drifted apart. She dove upward, as if under the billowing hem of bridal gown, into the midst of the drifting figure, into the center of the light-pierced dancing cloud."

== Critical reception ==
Literary scholars regard Starlite Terrace as an exemplary example of the current trend of postsecular fiction in the wake of Charles Taylor's study A Secular Age (2007), which is characterized by a new interest in spiritual content and existential experiences. Accordingly, the four narratives illustrate religiously alienated life in the radically secularized society of the film city Los Angeles; at the same time, they reveal the search movements of the four protagonists for the transcendent center of life. Starlite Terrace in this sense documents the disappearance of religious practice and religious knowledge in Western societies and at the same time reveals the tendency to search for the lost center of meaning in the substitute world of film and its deified stars: "The stories in Starlite Terrace impressively illustrate the transformations of the religious sphere in Western societies under the conditions of what Charles Taylor has described as the secular age. [...] Religion is individual, unfinishable search for meaning."

This constellation is reflected in the narrative method. Due to its metafictional structure, Roth's neorealistic narrative exhibits postmodern experimental traits; it resorts to cinematic methods in order to intensify the impact of certain effects and to open up mythical depth dimensions. The narrative structure is reminiscent of a layered model: "The world projected in Starlite Terrace rests on a double foundation, insofar as the archetypal world of the psyche appears beneath the external Los Angeles culture, communicating itself in [...] interwoven dreams - as a compensatory supplement, conveyed in timelessly mythical images, to the superficially trivial everyday reality, which is thus seen from a larger, transpersonal point of view." What characterizes post-secular literature are religious experiences in the form of "ontological openings" - sudden intrusions of another, larger world in the form of archetypal dreams and visions. Basically, the novel-like narrative cycle is distinguished by the postmodern interweaving of topoi from Judeo-Christian symbolism (e.g., the motif of the Flood, the Messiah as Redeemer, the Apocalypse, and the death on the cross as images of the end and renewal) with film images and film figures from Hollywood cinema.

Starlite Terrace has been described as highly self-reflexive prose in which storytelling as a medium is critically scrutinized. In reflecting on the stories he gathers, the narrator himself is subjected to a transformation that extends beyond the boundaries of the text. The poetological intention is "to unleash in the literary demonstration of the creation of reality through storytelling a dialectical countermovement to the aesthetic freezing of communication in the writtenness of the text, a countermovement which ultimately - in the act of reading and rereading the work - also takes hold of the relationship between author and audience."

== Editions ==
- Patrick Roth: Starlite Terrace, Frankfurt a. M.: Suhrkamp, 2004. ISBN 978-3-518-41662-4
- Patrick Roth: Starlite Terrace, London: Seagull Books, 2012. Translated by Krishna Winston. ISBN 978-0-85742-082-4
- Patrick Roth: Starlite Terrace, Paris: Le Bruit du Temps, 2016. Translated by Olivier Le Lay. ISBN 978-2-35873-094-5
