= Literaturpreis der Konrad-Adenauer-Stiftung =

German literary award

Literaturpreis der Konrad-Adenauer-Stiftung is a literary prize of Germany. The prize money is €20,000 and the prize ceremony takes place in Weimar. The first winner was Sarah Kirsch. The prize is awarded "to authors who give freedom their word". The Konrad Adenauer Foundation has been awarding the prize since 1993.

== Recipients ==
- 1993 Sarah Kirsch
- 1994 Walter Kempowski
- 1995 Hilde Domin
- 1996 Günter de Bruyn
- 1997 Thomas Hürlimann
- 1998 Hartmut Lange
- 1999 Burkhard Spinnen
- 2000 Louis Begley
- 2001 Norbert Gstrein
- 2002 Adam Zagajewski
- 2003 Patrick Roth
- 2004 Herta Müller
- 2005 Wulf Kirsten
- 2006 Daniel Kehlmann
- 2007 Petra Morsbach
- 2008 Ralf Rothmann
- 2009 Uwe Tellkamp
- 2010 Cees Nooteboom
- 2011 Arno Geiger
- 2012 Tuvia Rübner
- 2013 Martin Mosebach
- 2014 Rüdiger Safranski
- 2015 Marica Bodrožić
- 2016 Michael Kleeberg
- 2017 Michael Köhlmeier
- 2018 Mathias Énard
- 2019 Husch Josten
- 2020 Hans Pleschinski
- 2021 not awarded
- 2022 Barbara Honigmann
- 2023 Lutz Seiler
- 2024 Ulrike Draesner
- 2025 Iris Wolff
- 2026 Daniela Danz
