= Patrick Roth =

German writer (born 1953)

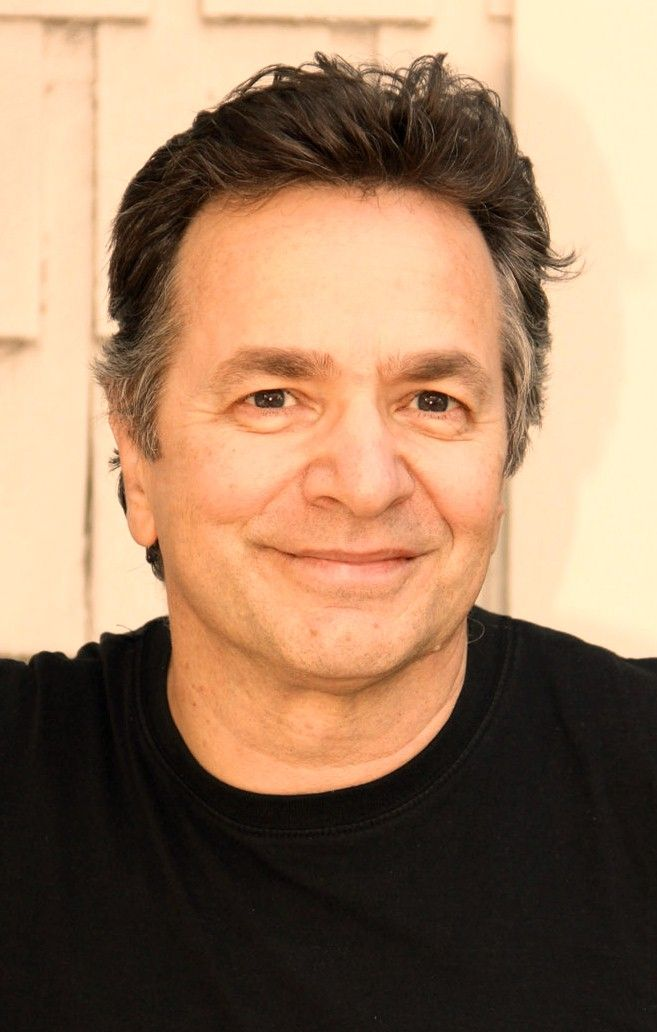

Patrick Roth (born June 25, 1953 in Freiburg/Breisgau) is a German writer. He moved to the USA in his early twenties and lived there for many years. The author of more than a dozen books, he has won a number of literary prizes including the Rauris Literature Prize, the Hugo-Ball-Preis and the Literaturpreis der Konrad-Adenauer-Stiftung. His book Starlite Terrace was translated into English by Krishna Winston.

== Books ==
- Roth, Patrick (2004). Starlite Terrace. Frankfurt am Main: Suhrkamp. ISBN 3-518-41662-6. OCLC 56198303.
  - Roth, Patrick; Winston, Krishna (2012). Starlite Terrace. London: Seagull Books. ISBN 978-0-85742-082-4. OCLC 788273963.
