= Zeitraumexit =

Artist center in Mannheim, Germany

Coordinates: 49.4951707°N 8.4552147°E

Zeitraumexit is an arts centre in Mannheim, Germany, established in 2000 as a result of a merger between Zeitraum für Büro und Kunst and EX!T Ausgangspunkt Theater. It is an independent non-profit association which organizes, curates and co-produces exhibitions, performances, theatre, video art and installations.

== History ==
The founding members of Zeitraumexit were artists Gabriele Osswald (performance, visual arts), Wolfgang Sautermeister (performance, visual arts), Elke Schmid (director) and Tilo Schwarz (drawing, set & lighting design), as well as the executive board of Manfred Ziegler, Peter Empl and Gerhard Schöneberger. Elke Schmid left zeitraumexit in 2009 to pursue her work in Berlin.

From May 2000 to May 2007, zeitraumexit was based in the Mannheim district of Neckarstadt-Ost. In 2007, zeitraumexit moved into the Kaufmannmühle, a former corn mill and protected monument in the Jungbusch district.

In 2008, the artistic direction of zeitraumexit received the Baerwind prize from the Rudi-Baerwind foundation, which described the centre as "a meeting point for artists and people interested in art beyond established cultural institutions".
