= Ken Kupsch =

Australian rules footballer

Personal information
- Full name: Ken Kupsch
- Born: 28 October 1938
- Original team: Edithvale
- Height: 175 cm (5 ft 9 in)
- Weight: 78 kg (172 lb)

Playing career^{1}
Years	Club	Games (Goals)
1959	St Kilda	1 (0)
- ^{1} Playing statistics correct to the end of 1959.

Ken Kupsch (born 28 October 1938) is a former Australian rules footballer who played with St Kilda in the Victorian Football League (VFL).

== Notes ==
Friend and mentor to Bill Mcilroy
