= Gisela Kraft =

German author and poet

- Born: 28 June 1936; Berlin, Germany
- Died: 5 January 2010 (aged 73); Bad Berka, Thuringia, Germany
- Education: Free University of [West] Berlin
- Occupations: author poet translator

Gisela Kraft (28 June 1936 - 5 January 2010) was a German author and poet. She also undertook extensive work as a literary translator from Turkish to German.

Gisela Kraft formed her own judgements and lived by them. One adjective that repeatedly appears in sources describing her is "idiosyncratic".

== Life ==
Gisela Kraft was born in Berlin, where she grew up during the war years. Between 1956 and 1959 she undertook a training in Theatre and Eurythmy in Berlin, Stuttgart and Dornach. Between 1960 and 1972 she engaged in a succession of theatre jobs. An abrupt change came in 1972 when she enrolled at the Free University in West Berlin and embarked on a degree course in Islamic studies. Six years later, in 1978, she received her doctorate with a dissertation (subsequently published) on the Turkish poet Fazıl Hüsnü Dağlarca. She stayed on at the Free University as an academic researcher at the Institute for Islamic studies from 1978 till 1983.

During the early 1980s Kraft was chair of the "Neue Gesellschaft für Literatur" ("New Society for Literature") in West Berlin which she co-founded. She was also actively involved, within the wider Peace movement, in the "Artists for Peace" ("Künstler für den Frieden") initiative. A committed socialist, in November 1984 Kraft relocated from the west to East Berlin. In the west she had found herself under attack from Turkish leftwing intellectuals because she had dared to translate Nâzım Hikmet's Bedreddin Epic. In the east she was offered a permanent translating job with a major publisher. It was unusual for West Germans to emigrate permanently to East Germany at this time: in a posthumously published memoir entitled "Mein Land, ein anderes" (loosely "My country, a different way") Kraft would recall in comic detail the difficulty the East German frontier official checking her papers had in accepting that she had no plans to "return home" to the west.

She lived, sometimes critical but generally happily in the German Democratic Republic (East Germany) for the next six years. In the east she was able to support herself as a poet in a way that would have been more difficult or impossible in the west, and she quickly developed a network of close friends, although perhaps her most constant companion during this period was her overindulged cat, Sofia ("Söfchen"), a present from the poet Hinnerk Einhorn after the death of her "western" cat, Leila, shortly after the crossing to the east : one of the most important services a friend could provide was to look after the cat when Kraft had to be away from home overnight for a poetry reading. She also developed a deep affection for and knowledge of Sorbian language and literary culture. Some years after the changes which led to reunification, she relocated to Weimar which she had known when she was a child because it was where her grandmother lived, and where from 1997 she lived out the rest of her life.

At the end Gisela Kraft fell ill with cancer. She refused conventional medical treatment and suffered a long decline, dying in the arms of her favourite sister, Reinhild, at a clinic in Bad Berka, near her Weimar home.

== Works ==
In her poetry and in her prose works Gisela Kraft treated her impression of her travels in the Near East and her scholarly research of Turkish culture. From this she emerged as a literary translator from Turkish. She received the Weimar Prize for this in 2006. In 2009 she was awarded the Christoph Martin Wieland Translator Prize for her epilogue to Nâzım Hikmet's "Die Namen der Sehnsucht" ("The Names of Yearning").

=== Published output (selection) ===
- Die Überfahrt des Franziskus, Spieltext, Bärenreiter Verlag, Kassel 1977
- Fazil Hüsnü Dağlarca – Weltschöpfung und Tiersymbolik, Dissertation, Klaus Schwarz Verlag, Freiburg im Breisgau 1978
- Eines Nachts in der Zeit, Gedichte, Edition der 2, Berlin 1979
- Die Schlange Gedächtnis, Märchen, Harran Verlag, Berlin 1980
- Wovon lebt der Mensch, (nach Lew Tolstoi). Spieltext, Bärenreiter Verlag, Kassel 1980
- Istanbuler Miniaturen, Gedichte, Verlag Eremiten-Presse, Düsseldorf 1981
- Aus dem Mauer-Diwan, Gedichte, Verlag Eremiten-Presse, Düsseldorf 1983
- Schwarzwild, Geschichten, LCB-Editionen 73, Berlin 1983
- Müllname oder Vom Abschied der Gegenstände, Erzählung, Verlag Eremiten-Presse, Düsseldorf 1984
- An den zeitlosen Geliebten, Gedichte, Verlag Eremiten-Presse, Düsseldorf 1985
- Katze und Derwisch, Gedichte, Aufbau Verlag, Berlin & Weimar 1985, erweiterte Ausgabe 1989
- Sintflut, Märchen und Träume, Mitteldeutscher Verlag, Halle/Saale 1990
- Prolog zu Novalis, Roman, Aufbau Verlag, Berlin & Weimar 1990
- West-östliche Couch – Zweierlei Leidensweisen der Deutschen, Noten und Abhandlungen, Aufbau Taschenbuch Verlag, Berlin 1991
- Keilschrift, Gedichte, Aufbau Verlag, Berlin & Weimar 1992
- Zu machtschlafener Zeit, Postpolitisches Fragment, Dietz Verlag, Berlin 1994
- Madonnensuite, Romantiker-Roman, Verlag Faber & Faber, Leipzig 1998
- Prinz und Python, Erzählung, Verlag Eremiten-Presse, Düsseldorf 2000
- Schwarz wie die Nacht ist mein Fell, Katzenverse & Collagen, quartus Verlag, Bucha bei Jena 2001
- Rundgesang am Neujahrsmorgen, Eine Familienchronik, Edition Muschelkalk, Wartburg Verlag, Weimar 2001
- Matrix, Gedichte, Eremiten-Presse, Düsseldorf 2003
- Planet Novalis, Roman in 7 Stationen, Verlag Faber & Faber, Leipzig 2006
- Aus Mutter Tonantzins Kochbuch, 33 Gedichte, quartus-verlag, Bucha bei Jena 2006
- Weimarer Störung: Gedichte aus dem Nachlass, Edition Muschelkalk, Bd. 33, hrsg. von Kai Agthe, Wartburg Verlag, Weimar 2010
- Mein Land, ein anderes – Deutsch-deutsche Erinnerungen, Edition Azur, Dresden 2013

=== Translations (selection) ===
- Fazıl Hüsnü Dağlarca: Brot und Taube, Berlin 1984
- Fazıl Hüsnü Dağlarca: Komm endlich her nach Anatolien, Berlin 1981
- Yunus Emre & Pir Sultan Abdal: Mit Bergen mit Steinen, Gedichte –Dağlar ile taşlar ile, Harran Verlag, Berlin 1981
- Nâzim Hikmet: Bleib dran, Löwe!, Berlin 1984 (übersetzt zusammen mit H. Wilfrid Brands)
- Nâzim Hikmet: Die Liebe ein Märchen, Berlin 1987
- Nâzim Hikmet: Schakale, Frankfurt am Main 1981
- Nâzim Hikmet: Unterwegs, Frankfurt am Main 1981
- Nâzim Hikmet: Die Namen der Sehnsucht, Zürich 2008
- Marja Krawcec: Ralbitzer Sonntag, Düsseldorf 1993
- Aziz Nesin: Surnâme, Düsseldorf 1988
- Vasif Öngören: Die Küche der Reichen, Berlin 1980
- Aras Ören: Deutschland, ein türkisches Märchen, Düsseldorf 1978
- Aras Ören: Die Fremde ist auch ein Haus, Berlin 1980
- Aras Ören: Mitten in der Odyssee, Düsseldorf 1980
- Aras Ören: Privatexil, Berlin 1977
- Bekir Yıldız: Südostverlies, Berlin 1987
- Bekir Yıldız: Topkapi-Harran einfach, Berlin 1983
