= Adelheid Duvanel =

Swiss writer

- Born: Adelheid Feigenwinter; 23 April 1936; Pratteln, Switzerland
- Died: 8 July 1996; Arisdorf, Switzerland
- Occupation: Writer of "prose miniatures"
- Spouse: Joseph Edward Duvanel
- Children: Adelheid Duvanel (1964–2005)
- Parent(s): Georg Feigenwinter (1904–1997); Elisabeth Lichtenhahn
- Writing career
- Pen name: Judith, Judith January

Adelheid Duvanel (born Adelheid Feigenwinter: 23 April 1936 – 8 July 1996) was a Swiss writer. Her earlier work appeared under one of two simple pseudonyms, "Judith" or "Judith January".

== Life ==
=== Provenance and troubled childhood ===
Adelheid Feigenwinter, the oldest of her parents' four children, was born in Pratteln. There had been five children, but her brother Stefan died in infancy. She grew up initially in Pratteln, where her parents rented a large rambling house with a child-friendly garden, and then when her father got a full-time job at the district court there, to a modern easy-to-manage family apartment in Liestal. These are small towns to the east and south of Basel along the old road towards Olten, but still within the Canton of Basel-Landschaft, and thereby culturally and linguistically Germanic. Her father, Georg Feigenwinter, was a lawyer and court official who rose through the ranks to become, in 1959, president of the cantonal criminal and youth court. Slightly unusually, the religious differences that had been a feature of the region for centuries were reflected in the family home. Georg Feigenwinter was a deeply committed Catholic while Adelheid's mother, born Elisabeth Lichtenhahn, had been born a city girl and grown up as a Protestant. Both her parents could trace their Swiss ancestry back to the renaissance period, but her mother's family had originally come from Leipzig, obtaining Swiss citizenship rights as recently as 1524. The child's own intellectual capacities were unmissable from an early stage: both at junior school and within the family they spoke of her as something of a "Wunderkind". Later during her young life the situation at home darkened. She would recall that she found her parents stern, "repressive" and remote. There were hospital visits and psychotherapy sessions. At one stage, as an adolescent, she stopped talking and refused to leave her room for days on end. She drew ceaselessly and insisted that she needed a training at an art college, but was instead enrolled at a Catholic boarding school. According to one source she was subjected to Electroconvulsive therapy and insulin therapy, two subsequently discredited treatments for what had been diagnosed by physicians assigned to Adelheid Feigenwinter's as "Aphasia".

Towards the end of the 1950s she enrolled at an Applied Arts College ("Kunstgewerbeschule"). At around the same time she also commenced (but never completed) a course in textiles design.

=== Writer ===
Adelheid Feigenwinter started writing short stories when she was 7. The drawing and painting came only a few years later. When she was married she broke of the painting. Her husband, also a painter, was an insecure man and, by all accounts, a brutish marriage partner. But the short stories – identified by admirers as "Prosaminiaturen" ("prose miniatures"), continued to flow. Her first published work, entitled "In the Shadow of the Madhouse", appeared when she was 19. A year later, in 1976, the first collected volume of her works appeared. Many of the stories in it had been published in newspapers during the preceding months, especially at that time the Sunday supplement of the Basler Nachrichten. More volumes of "Prosaminiaturen" followed. Critics and scholars were impressed: "Open a page at random, and [wherever you land] Adelheid Duvanel's dense sentences will drive you breathlessly to read on. Expressionistic imagery blends with laconic intimate social realism ..... Precisely targeted whips land right at the beginning in Duvanel's exceptionally thick prose." Or again: "evocative, stripped-down, spare and metaphor-rich and can be savoured line by line, like poetry. Sullen, sardonic, simultaneously wistful and gloomy, [her] prose miniatures are twisted fairy tales featuring pixie depressives nurturing secret griefs". Prizes followed. One of her greatest fans was the professor and literature polymath Peter von Matt, who contributed lengthy elucidatory epilogues for two of her volumes.

After concluding her artistic training Adelheid Feigenwinter supplemented her income with a series of office jobs. At one stage she was employed by an opinion research organisation. Adelheid Feigenwinter married the painter Joseph Edward Duvanel in 1962. Throughout their marriage, which lasted till 1981, they lived together in Basel, albeit with one lengthy exception, during 1969/69, when they took an extended trip to the little island of Formentera (directly to the south of Ibiza). By that time the couple's daughter Adelheid had been born, in 1964. By this time she had also, for the first time, published one of her prose miniatures, "Aus dem Leben einer Buckligen" ("From the life of a hunchback"), under the name by which, subsequently, she has come to be remembered: "Adelheid Duvanel".

=== A bad marriage ===
According to a later narrative that she produced, Adelheid and her future husband were drawn together by the deep love of Chopin which they shared. Their first meeting took place at her parents' house: her younger brother Felix and brought his friend Joe home with the very best of intentions, because he thought that contact between Adelheid and, another talented young artist with a temperament to match, might help draw Adelheid out of the isolation into which she had sunk, still living with her deeply conservative parents, and two younger siblings with effortlessly conformist instincts, at the age of 19. At the time of that first meeting both Adelheid and Joe became "totally drunk". Joseph Duvanel, aged just 15 at the time, played a Chopin waltz on her parents' old piano, and Adelheid found him "so sensitive, so strange, so refined, so filled with controlled power" (Note: "...so sinnlich, so fremd, so verfeinert, so voll verhaltener Kraft...") that she found she had fallen in love. After several years of happy marriage, Joseph Duvanel proved to have become exceptionally domineering husband, living out through his marriage ideas about "a woman's place" which were already wholly out of fashion, even in conservative Switzerland. His Anglo-Indian mother had come from England and never mastered very much of the Swiss German language: his father came originally from Francophone Neuchâtel and spoke the Basel language only as a second tongue. For his own reasons Joseph Duvanel, like his wife, had grown up to accept endlessly the role of an outsider. Nevertheless, Joe was the more sociable of the couple. During the early years of their marriage, when their apartment was something of a meeting point for Basel's young Bohemians, the painter Joseph Duvanel was the focus of attention, while his wife typically remained isolated in a corner.

Having forbidden Adelheid to produce her paintings, he drove home the injunction by finding artworks that she had produced which he found. During their stay on Formentera Joseph moved across to the other side of the little island and teamed up with another woman, whom he started introducing as his wife. Adelheid returned to Basel with her daughter and lived temporarily with her aging parents, while her brother Felix arranged for her prose miniatures to be published in newspapers to provide her with a necessary income. When Joe and his new friend returned to Basel he succeeded in negotiation a shared domestic arrangement which amounted to living as a threesome. From time to time other friends came and went. The family structure that Duvanel imposed on his growing family involved him taking the role of the family painter and "Wife two" (Ferenc Jánossy) going out to supplement the family income through paid work. Adelheid, as "Wife one" was expected to stay home, clean the house, cook the meals, and look after the child. It seemed that accepted the arrangement because, in the context of her financial and emotional dependency, she knew of no alternative. Following the birth of Joseph, the child of "Wife two", there were two children for her to look after. In 1979, by which time Adelheid's fifteen year old daughter – also, at Joseph's insistencen, named Adelheid – had become a drug addict and thereby an AIDS victim, the child was driven from the family home by her father. Although Adelheid the child's mother was by this time leading her life in a submissive haze, the expulsion of her daughter from the family apartment caused her a level of upset which led to her being sent away to another clinic. When she came out to give a public reading of her work she would explain without elaboration that she had "come from the clinic". When the reading was concluded she would return there. None of this made for marital harmony, nor for happiness among the participants. Sources differ when it comes to the timeline whereby the marriage ended. The later years of her time with Duvanel involved frequent visits to the clinic for Adelaide. It was probably during 1981 that they separated, and then during or soon after 1982 that they divorced. While continuing to publish her short stories in the Basel newspapers, Adelheid Duvanel now returned als to her painting. While her "prose miniatures", notwithstanding their frequently grim dénouements, retained a certain cool detachment throughout her personal difficulties, there are commentators who identify something curiously autobiographical in the unhappiness communicated by many of her art works.

=== Later years ===
For the rest of her life, from approximately 1980, Adelheid Duvanel was subjected to repeated bouts of psychiatric treatment, although she became progressively more distrustful of the practitioners providing it. The divorce left her chronically short of money. She lived with her terminally ill daughter and her daughter's toddler under conditions of significant penury. Her compelling short stories continued to appear in newspaper columns and from time to time there were also further volumes containing compilations of her prose miniatures published. She continued to win plaudits from scholars and critics for her "prose miniatures", but her talent was little acknowledged by any wider readership during her lifetime. At the end of 1986 news came through that her former husband had committed suicide. Towards the end she suffered a protracted episode of memory loss and disorientation, and was advised by one of the professionals whom she consulted to expect such incidents to recur and become progressively more frequent. That would have put an end to her writing, and left her in a situation of abject dependency.

=== Death ===
On the first day of Christmas in 1956 two farm workers found the body of Robert Walser, frozen to death in the snow in the hills near Herisau. In July 1996 a rider in the forested countryside to the south of Basel in Arisdorf found the body of Adelheid Duvanel, also apparently dead through Hypothermia: despite the season, it was a freakishly cold July. It seemed as though she had simply lain down to rest and not woken up. It soon emerged that she had also taken an overdose of sleeping pills. Her body was found to contain, in addition, the various prescription drugs with which, by this time, she lived. It has remained unclear ever since whether her death should be viewed as an accident, a suicide, or some indeterminate combination of the two.

Commentators quickly identified a long list of parallels between the lives, the output, and the deaths of Walser and Duvanel, two brilliant writers who had both, during their final decades, increasingly fallen under the supervision of psychiatrists, but Walser had lived slightly longer and, it seemed, achieved a slightly more broadly based level of recognition with readers during his lifetime. In a piece written after her death, Peter Hamm offered the possible explanation that "perhaps Adelheid Duvanel's literary accomplishments were only possible at the price of being misunderstood". (Note: "Aber vielleicht ist das, was Adelheid Duvanel literarisch leistete, nur um den Preis des Verkanntseins zu haben.")

== Recognition (selection) ==
- 1981 Kleiner Basler Kunstpreis
- 1984 Kranichsteiner Literature Prize
- 1987 Literature Prize from the City of Basel
- 1988 Prize for the author's overall output from the Swiss Schiller Foundation
- 1995 Guest prize from the Canton of Bern

== Published output (selection) ==
- Merkwürdige Geschichten aus Basel. (with Felix Feigenwinter and Gunild Regine Winter). Mond-Buch, Basel 1978.
- Wände, dünn wie Haut. in the "Gute Schriften" series (GS 453), Basel 1979.
- Windgeschichten. Luchterhand, Darmstadt 1980.
- Das Brillenmuseum. Erzählungen. Luchterhand, Darmstadt 1982.
- Anna und ich. Erzählungen. Luchterhand, Darmstadt 1985.
- Das verschwundene Haus. Erzählungen. Luchterhand, Darmstadt 1988.
- Gnadenfrist. Erzählungen. Luchterhand, Frankfurt am Main 1991.
- Die Brieffreundin. Erzählungen. Luchterhand, München 1995.
- Der letzte Frühlingstag. Erzählungen, hrsg. v. Klaus Siblewski. Nachwort von Peter von Matt. Luchterhand, München 1997.
- Beim Hute meiner Mutter. Erzählungen. Nachwort von Peter von Matt. Nagel & Kimche, Zürich 2004.
- Fern von hier. Gesammelte Erzählungen. Hrsg. Elsbeth Dangel-Pelloquin und Friederike Kretzen. Limmat, Zürich 2021, ISBN 978-3-03926-013-3
