= Hans-Karl von Kupsch =

German jurist (1937–2020)

- Hans-Karl von Kupsch, c. 2010
- Born: 7 March 1937; Luckau
- Died: 26 April 2020 (aged 83)
- Occupation: Jurist
- Organizations: Börsenverein des Deutschen Buchhandels
- Awards: Order of Merit of the Federal Republic of Germany

Hans-Karl von Kupsch (7 March 1937 – 26 April 2020) was a German jurist, who served from 1974 to 2000 as managing director of the Börsenverein des Deutschen Buchhandels. He led the booksellers' association during times of changes, especially in information technology and due to the German reunification. He also ran, together with his wife Hilde, a gallery of contemporary art, Galerie von Kupsch.

== Life ==
Born in Luckau the son of a jurist (Amtsgerichtsrat), Kupsch studied law, gaining a doctorate. He worked for the Börsenverein des Deutschen Buchhandels for 35 years, as managing director of its Verleger-Ausschuss from 1966 to 1973, and then as its managing director (erster Hauptgeschäftsführer) until 2000. During his tenure, the association successfully coped with changes in economy, politics and society, integrating information technology in the bookselling trade.

Dealing with the German reunification, the Buchhändlertage convention met in Leipzig the spring of 1990, which decided that the organisation would unify with its Leipzig counterpart. It also paved the way for the German National Library in Berlin, merging the library in Leipzig (Deutsche Bibliothek Leipzig), founded in 1912, and in Frankfurt (Deutsche Bibliothek Frankfurt), founded in 1946. Kupsch was described as mastering the challenges of these processes, which required legal and intellectual expertise as well as taking the human factor into account, with "cool planning, elegant demeanor and prudent action" ("der kühl planende, elegant auftretende und umsichtig agierende ...").

Even in retirement, he kept supporting Leipzig as the German center of books: the Haus des Buches, the Leipzig Book Fair, and the Leipzig Book Award for European Understanding. He initiated an office at the Berlin Schiffbauerdamm, as a meeting place for intellectuals, book makers, politicians and artists. He was awarded the Order of Merit of the Federal Republic of Germany in 1997, and a plaque "Dem Förderer des deutschen Buches" (To the Patron of the German Book) in 2001.

Kupsch was married to Hilde, née Seifert; the couple had three children. They ran a private gallery of contemporary art in Langen, Galerie von Kupsch, until 2004, where they invited artists to the vernissages. He died on 26 April 2020 after a long illness of the lungs.
