= Ilse Konell =

German female literary patron

Ilse Konell (5 November 1919 as Ilse Helene Schmeißer – 17 September 2012) was a German literature patron of the arts.

== Life ==
Born in Oederan, Konell lived together with her husband, the poet George Konell, in Wiesbaden since 1955, and later also in Wyk on the North Sea island Föhr and in the North Frisian Niebüll. After the death of her husband, she decided to promote literature in Wiesbaden as a patron and publisher. In this way she wanted to keep her husband's work alive in the public consciousness and at the same time support the work of freelance writers, whose existential needs she knew from her own experience.

Konell maintained numerous contacts with other German cultural figures throughout his life, including the writer Johannes Mario Simmel and the actor Klaus Maria Brandauer. She died in 2012 at the age of 92 in Mölln, the residence of her final years.

Konell is buried next to her husband in Wiesbaden's Südfriedhof cemetery.

== Prize foundations ==
In memory of her husband's literary work, Konell has donated several literary prizes in cooperation with the state capital Wiesbaden.

=== George-Konell-Prize and George-Konell-Förderpreis ===
The George-Konell-Preis of the state capital Wiesbaden is awarded every two years for a literary complete work or a literary first publication of an author. The artists must have their permanent residence in Hessen. The prize is endowed with a prize money of 5,000 euros. The prize winners are selected by a jury, which is appointed for two award ceremonies each.

The €500 George Konnell Prize is awarded every two years to a student for a prose text. The work is expected to demonstrate a confident, sensitive and creative use of the German language. There are no specifications as to the content. A jury decides on the awarding of the prize every two years.

=== Wiesbadener Lyrikpreis Orphil and Orphil Debut Prize ===
The Wiesbadener Lyrikpreis Orphil, endowed with 10,000 euros, was awarded for the first time on the occasion of the poet's 100th birthday in 2012 and will in future be presented every two years by the state capital Wiesbaden in cooperation with hr2-Kultur. George Konell called the iron cocks on the town halls of France, which for him embodied the song of the singer Orpheus as well as the ideals of the French Revolution, Orphil. The literary prize is awarded to poets whose works take a stand and know how to resist political and stylistic fashions. An independent jury, consisting of the critic and editor Michael Brown, the literary critic Alf Mentzer of the Hessischer Rundfunk and the writer Silke Scheuermann, selects the winners.

The jury will also award the Orphil Debut Prize worth 2,500 euros.

== Acting as a publisher ==
To ensure the publication of George Konell's works after his death in 1991, Konell founded the Orphil-Verlag in Niebüll in 1999, which continued until her death in 2012. As the executor of her husband's estate, she edited all publications of the publishing house herself. In 2011, she published her autobiography Die Frau des Dichters: Memoiren einer Rothaarigen.

== Publications ==
- George Konell: Janin. Gedicht-Zyklus. Euro-Verlag Schweiz, Thun 1998 / Orphil, Niebüll 1999.
- George Konell: Aschermittwoch. 2. Teil: Charon - Des Fährmanns Nein. Orphil, Niebüll 2000.
- George Konell: Tehura. Poetische Impressionen. Orphil, Niebüll 2001.
- Ilse Konell (ed.): Jules Siber: Paganinis Wiederkehr. Ein Leben für die Kunst. Orphil, Niebüll 2003.
- George Konell: Das Amselnest. Orphil, Niebüll 2004.
- George Konell: Requiem. Trauerspiel um Mozarts Tod. Orphil, Niebüll 2006.
- Ilse Konell: Die Frau des Dichters: Memoiren einer Rothaarigen. Aufzeichnungen. Orphil, Niebüll 2011.
