= 2027 German presidential election =

18th German federal presidential election

- 30 January 2027
Incumbent President
Frank-Walter Steinmeier
SPD

The 2027 German presidential election, officially the 18th Federal Convention, will be held on 30 January 2027, (Note: Technically speaking, the 18th Federal Convention merely has to convene on that day; there is no time limit for the election to be successfully held. Should a successful election not take place by the end of the incumbent's term of office (in this case, by 18 March 2027), the President of the Bundesrat, as the President's constitutional deputy, would temporarily assume the duties of office. To date, however, every Federal Convention has managed to complete the election process on the very day it convened.) before the end of the term of office of the current German president, Frank-Walter Steinmeier. As Steinmeier has already served two consecutive terms of office (2017–2022 and 2022–2027), he is subject to the term limit under Article 54(2) of the Basic Law and cannot stand for re-election. (Note: According to the prevailing view, the term-limit provision in Article 54 (2) of the Basic Law applies only to consecutive terms of office, meaning that Steinmeier’s election for further terms following an interruption would, in theory, be in accordance with the Constitution.)

== Voting procedure ==
The German president is elected by the Federal Convention, a non-permanent constitutional body whose sole function is to carry out this task. According to paragraph 3 of Article 54 of the Basic Law, the Federal Convention is composed of all the members of the Bundestag (the federal parliament) and an equal number of state electors who are elected by the state parliaments based on the principle of proportional representation. Under the current electoral system introduced in 2023, the number of Bundestag members is fixed at 630, leading to a Federal Convention of 1,260 members.

The Federal Convention must convene no later than 30 days before the end of the incumbent's term of office or – in the event of a premature termination of office – no later than 30 days after the vacancy arises. Steinmeier's term expires on 19 March 2027, setting a deadline of 17 February for the convention to meet.

Voting in the Federal Convention is by secret ballot and without debate. In the first two rounds of voting, a majority of all members of the Convention (i.e., 631 votes) is required for a successful election. If no candidate receives such a majority in two rounds of voting, on further ballots a plurality of votes cast is sufficient.

== Date and composition of the 18th Federal Convention ==
On 26 February 2026, Julia Klöckner, the President of the Bundestag, ordered that the 18th Federal Convention be convened on 30 January 2027. According to the Federal Government's announcement of 16 September 2026, the 630 state electors are distributed among the sixteen states as follows:

State	Electors
North Rhine-Westphalia	134
Bavaria	99
Baden-Württemberg	82
Lower Saxony	63
Hesse	45
Saxony	33
Rhineland-Palatinate	31
Berlin	26
Schleswig-Holstein	21
Brandenburg	21
Saxony-Anhalt	17
Thuringia	17
Hamburg	13
Mecklenburg-Vorpommern	13
Saarland	8
Bremen	5

No further elections are scheduled at either the federal or state level before the 18th Federal Convention convenes. Assuming there are no snap elections, and assuming that all state legislatures elect delegations that exactly reflect their compositions, the following distribution of seats, as calculated by Wahlrecht.de, is expected:

Party	Bundestag members	State electors	Total electors
CDU/CSU (Note: As is customary in the Bundestag, the CDU and its Bavarian sister party, the CSU, sit together in the Federal Convention. Of the CDU/CSU electors, 86 are expected to be members of the CSU (44 of whom are members of the Bundestag and 42 state electors for Bavaria).)	208	223–224	431–432
AfD	150	110–112	260–262
SPD	120	131–133	251–253
Alliance '90/The Greens	85	108–112	193–197
The Left	64	14–16	78–80
Free Voters	0	18	18
FDP	0	11	11
BSW	0	7	7
SSW	1	1	2
Thüringen.Gerecht	0	2	2
Non-inscrits/Independents	2	0	2
Total	630	630	1260

Ranges (e.g., 0–1) indicate cases in which multiple parties would have an equal mathematical claim to the last seat in a state delegation, provided all members of the respective state parliament take part in the election and vote for their own party's list of candidates; if necessary, the decision is made by drawing lots.

=== Notable electors from outside politics ===
Though state delegations typically consist of businesspeople, current and former politicians, and trade association leaders, it is not uncommon for parties with large delegations to fill them out with celebrities and notable figures from other fields. The following have been publicly disclosed as being named an elector:

- Tim Borowski, former professional footballer (CDU, Bremen)
- Cacau, former professional footballer (CDU, Baden-Württemberg)
- Hartmut Engler, lead singer of Pur (Greens, Baden-Württemberg)
- Dörte Hansen, journalist and novelist (SPD, Schleswig-Holstein)
- Klaas Heufer-Umlauf, actor and television host (SPD, Lower Saxony)
- Günther Jauch, host of Wer wird Millionär? (CDU, North Rhine-Westphalia)
- Mickie Krause, Schlager singer (SPD, North Rhine-Westphalia)
- Meron Mendel, social scientist and director of the Anne Frank Educational Centre (SPD, Hesse)
- Christiane Nüsslein-Volhard, biologist and co-winner of the 1995 Nobel Prize in Physiology or Medicine (Greens, Baden-Württemberg)
- Hans-Christoph Rademann, choral conductor (Greens, Baden-Württemberg)
- Katja Riemann, actress (SPD, Bremen)
- Johannes Strate, lead singer of Revolverheld (SPD, Lower Saxony)
- Caroline Wahl, novelist (Greens, Schleswig-Holstein)
- Patrick Wiencek, professional handballer (CDU, Schleswig-Holstein)

== Candidates ==
Candidates must be nominated by a member of the Federal Convention and must consent to that nomination. Only German citizens eligible to be elected to the Bundestag who are at least 40 years old on the day of the election are eligible to run. An incumbent may be re-elected to a consecutive term only once; therefore, Frank-Walter Steinmeier is ineligible for this election, while all other living former presidents (Christian Wulff and Joachim Gauck) are eligible.

=== Social discussion in advance ===
As in past elections, there are calls in the run-up to the election for a woman to be elected. To date, all German presidents have been male. In August 2025, chancellor and CDU leader Friedrich Merz said that he could "very well imagine" supporting the election of a first female German president.

In early November 2026, shortly before the CDU was due to select its nominee, Merz publicly committed to nominating a female candidate from the political center who could achieve a majority on the first ballot. Several prominent political leaders pre-empted Merz and endorsed a candidacy by the CSU's Ilse Aigner, the president of the Landtag of Bavaria, including the Minister-Presidents of Brandenburg (Dietmar Woidke), Thuringia (Mario Voigt), Saxony (Michael Kretschmer) and Saxony-Anhalt (Sven Schulze). Aigner was ultimately designated the CDU nominee with support from the SPD.

=== Declared candidates ===
The following individuals have been proposed as candidates for the office of president:

Portrait	Name	Party	Office(s) held	Home state	Profession(s)	Endorsements (Note: This column lists the parties represented at or individual members of the Federal Convention who have announced their nomination of or support for the candidate in question.)	Ref.
Ilse Aigner	Ilse Aigner (born 1964)	CSU	President of the Landtag of Bavaria (2018–present) Other offices: Member of the Landtag of Bavaria (1994–1998, 2013–present); Acting Minister-President of Bavaria (2018); Deputy Minister-President of Bavaria (2013–2018); Member of the Bundestag (1998–2013); Federal Minister for Agriculture, Food and Consumer Protection (2008–2013)	Bavaria	Engineer	CDU/CSU; SPD; Greens	
Thomas Berthold	Thomas Berthold (born 1964)	Independent	None	Lives abroad (Switzerland)	Footballer; Manager	AfD	
Gabriele Krone-Schmalz	Gabriele Krone-Schmalz (born 1949)	Independent	None	North Rhine-Westphalia	Journalist	BSW	

=== Possible candidates ===
The following individuals have been mentioned as potential candidates in political or media discussions and have not yet ruled out running for the office of president:

==== Independent ====
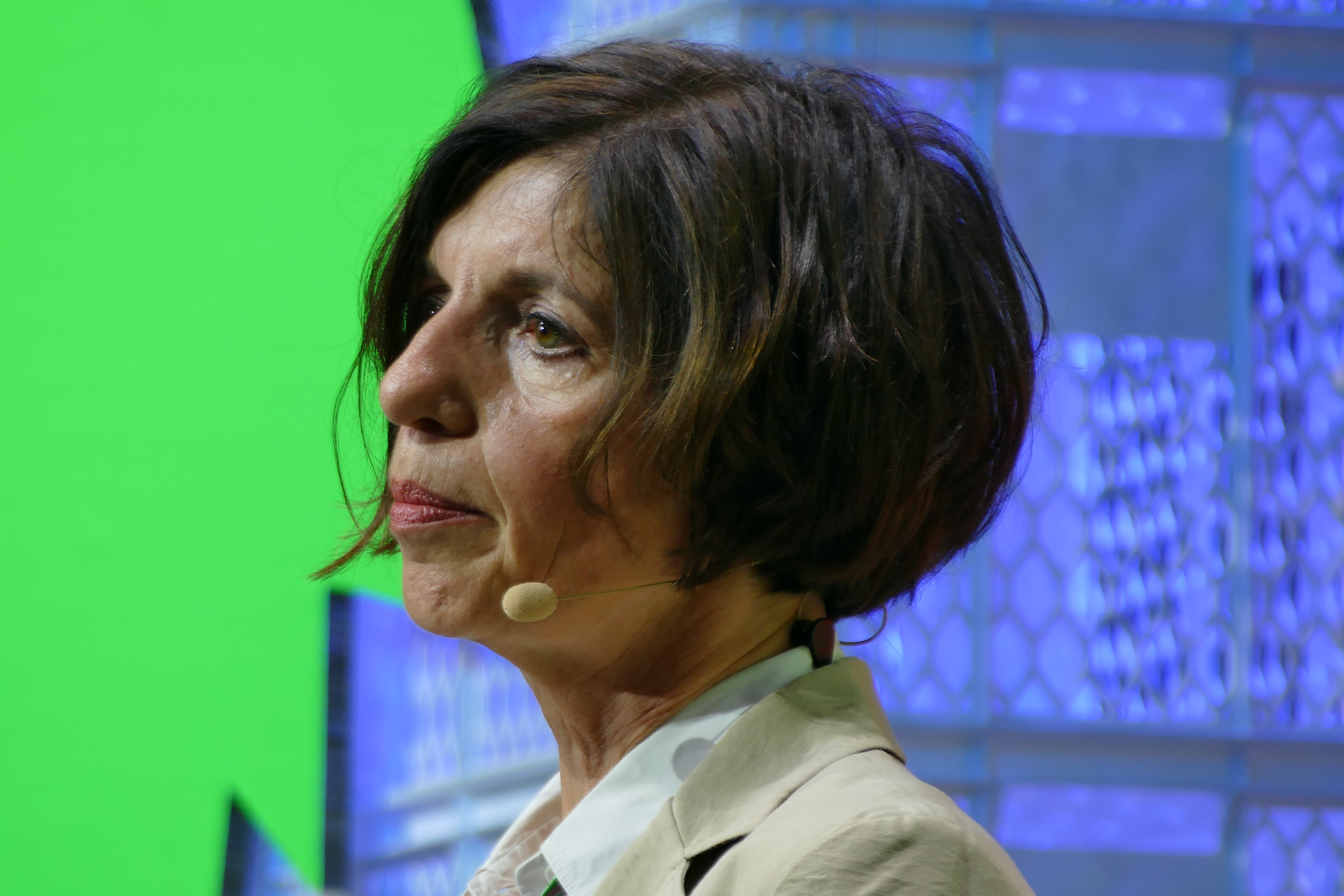
Jutta Allmendinger
Sociologist
Professor of educational sociology and labor market research at Humboldt University
(2007–)

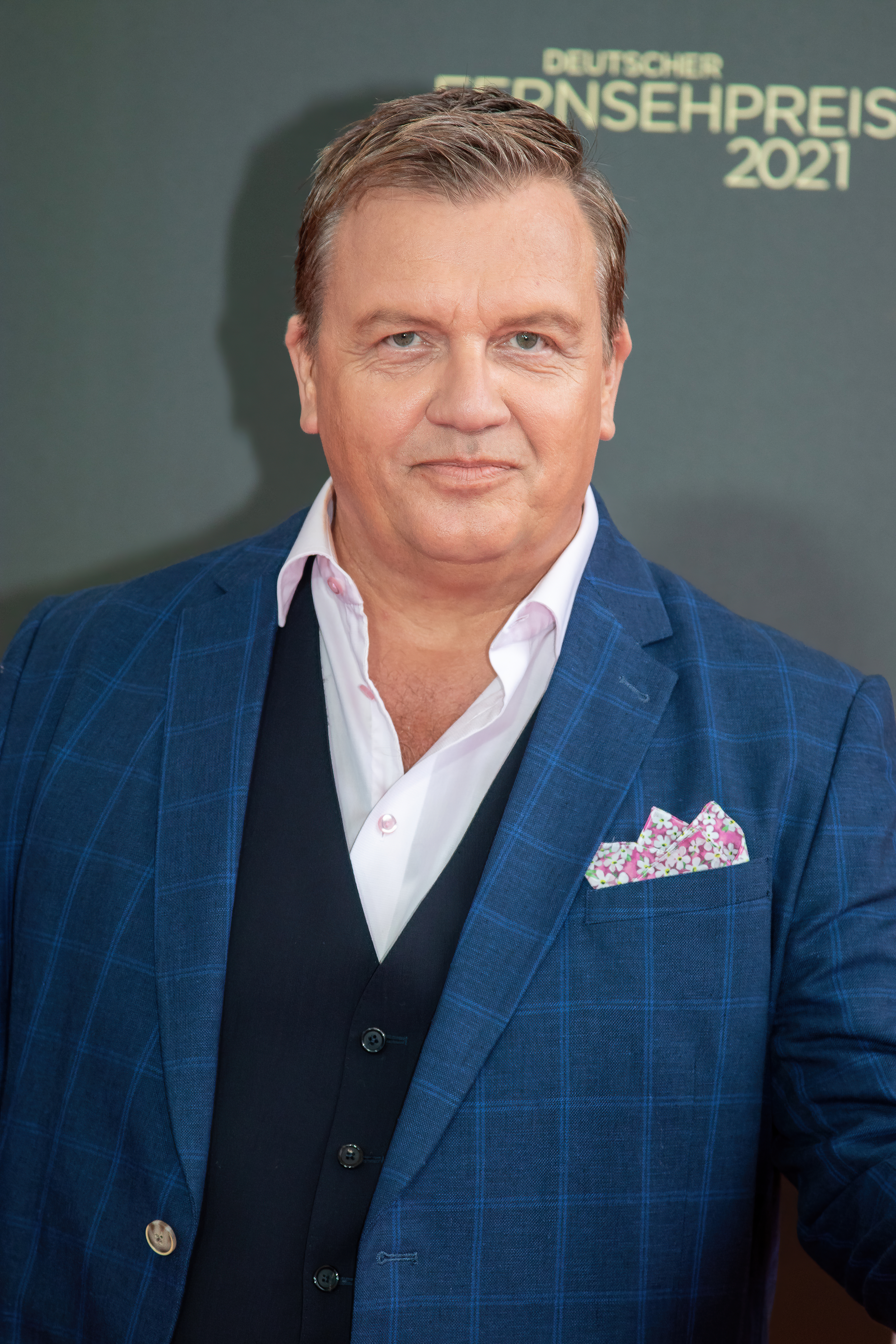
Hape Kerkeling
Comedian and actor

=== Declined or not considered candidates ===
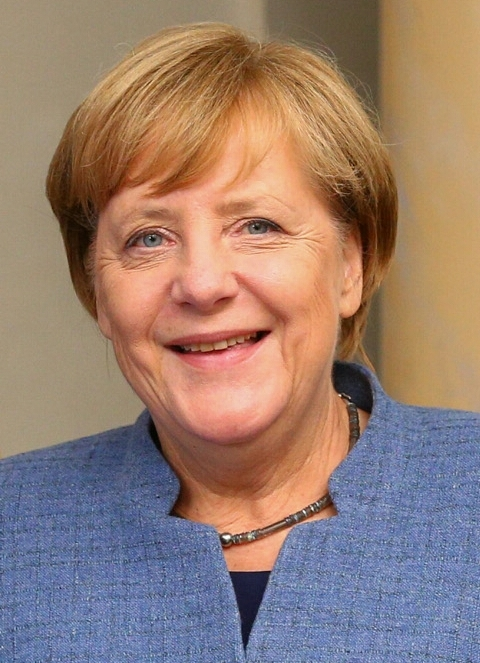
Former Chancellor Angela Merkel declined to seek the presidency in 2027.

The following individuals have been mentioned as potential candidates in political or media discussions, but have ruled out running for the office of president or have ultimately not been nominated:

- CDU/CSU
  - Ines Claus, Member of the Hesse state parliament (2018–)
  - Monika Grütters, Former Minister of State to the Chancellor; Federal Government Commissioner for Culture and Media (2013–2021)
  - Julia Klöckner, President of the Bundestag (2025–), Former Federal Minister for Food and Agriculture (2018–2021)
  - Annegret Kramp-Karrenbauer, Former Federal Minister for Defence (2019–2021), Former Minister-President of Saarland (2013–2018)
  - Ursula von der Leyen, President of the European Commission (2019–), Former Federal Minister for Defence (2013–2019), Former Federal Minister for Labour and Social Affairs (2009–2013), Former Federal Minister for Family Affairs, Senior Citizens, Women and Youth (2005–2009), Former Lower Saxony State Minister for Social Affairs, Women, Family and Health (2003–2005)
  - Angela Merkel, former Chancellor of Germany (2005–2021), former Federal Minister for the Environment, Nature Conservation, and Nuclear Safety (1994–1998), former Federal Minister for Women and Youth (1991–1994)
  - Karin Prien, Federal Minister for Education, Family Affairs, Senior Citizens, Women and Youth (2025–), Former Schleswig-Holstein State Minister for Education, Science and Culture (2017–2025)
  - Boris Rhein, Minister-President of Hesse (2022–), former President of the Hesse state parliament (2019–2022), former Hesse state minister for science and the arts (2014–2019), former Hesse state minister for the interior (2010–2014)
- SPD
  - Juli Zeh, judge and writer, Honorary judge at the State Constitutional Court of Brandenburg (2018–2026)
- Independent
  - Udo di Fabio, Former Justice at the Federal Constitutional Court (1999–2011)

== Transition ==
The President-elect is expected to take office at midnight on 19 March 2027, as the term of office of the current incumbent, Frank-Walter Steinmeier, expires on 18 March 2027. In due course, the swearing-in ceremony will take place before a joint session of the Bundestag and the Bundesrat (in accordance with Article 56 of the Basic Law).
