= Jynge =

Jynge is a surname. Notable people with the surname include:

- Andreas Jynge (1870–1955), Norwegian civil servant and writer
- Fatma Jynge (1945–2019), Afro-Norwegian architect and politician
- Gerhard Jynge (1877–1945), Norwegian newspaper editor

== See also ==
- Junge (surname)
