= Junge (surname) =

Junge is a surname. Notable people with the surname include:

- Alexa Junge, American television writer, producer and screenwriter
- Alfred Junge (1886–1964), German-British production designer
- Daniel Junge, American filmmaker
- Ekaterina Junge (1843–1913), Russian painter
- Ember Reichgott Junge (born 1953), American politician and attorney
- Eric Junge (born 1977), American baseball player
- Frank Junge (born 1967), German politician
- Franziska Junge (born 1981), German actress
- George Junge (1905–1962), Dutch ornithologist
- Hans Hermann Junge (1914–1944), SS-officer, valet to Adolf Hitler, husband of Traudl Junge
- Johan Boye Junge (1735–1807), Danish carpenter
- Kelly Junge Jr. (born 1950), American child actor
- Klaus Junge (1924–1945), Chilean–German chess master
- Otto Junge (1887–1978), Chilean–German chess master
- Ricarda Junge (born 1979), German writer
- Ryan Junge (born 1984), American soccer player
- Sofie Junge Pedersen (born 1992), Danish soccer player
- Traudl Junge (1920–2002), German private secretary to Adolf Hitler
- Wolf Junge (1903–1964), German naval officer
