= Georg-Christoph-Lichtenberg-Preis =

German art award

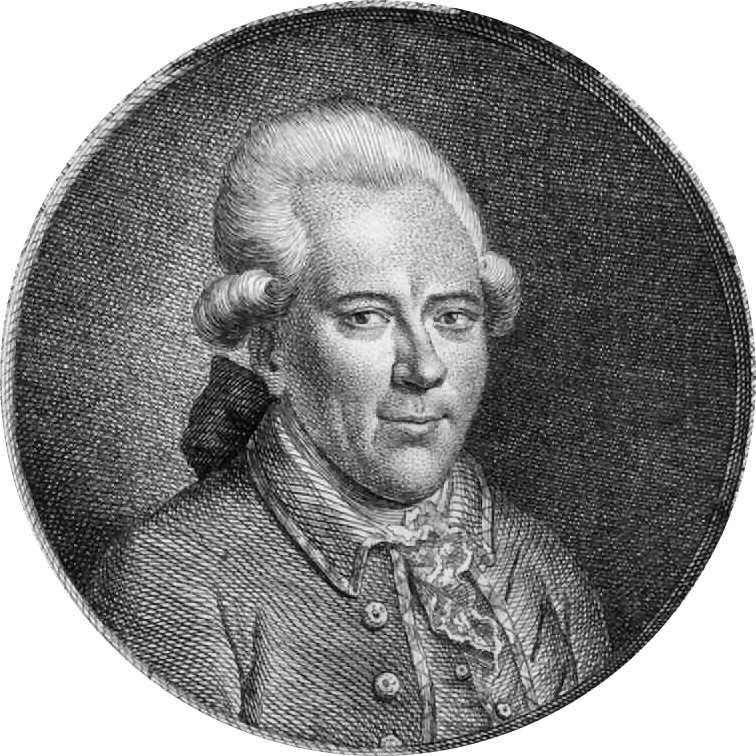
Portrait of Georg Christoph Lichtenberg

The Georg-Christoph-Lichtenberg-Preis is an arts prize of Hesse. It is awarded biannually for literature (since 1987) and the visual arts (since 1979) on a rotating basis by the district of Darmstadt-Dieburg. The winner receives a certificate as well as a donation of 10,000 euros, though it is possible for the prize money to be split evenly between two winners. A committee of fourteen jurors evaluates qualified submissions; all themes or literary genres are accepted.

The prize is named after Georg Christoph Lichtenberg, the Enlightenment physics professor and writer who was born in Ober-Ramstadt.

== Past Recipients (visual arts) ==
- Esteban Fekete (1979)
- Ernst Schonnefeld (1980)
- Leo Leonhard (1982)
- Bruno Müller-Linow (1984)
- Rainer Lind (1986)
- Barbara Breisinghoff (1988)
- Arno Jung (1990)
- Detlef Kraft (1992)
- Horst Evers alias Gerd Winter (1994)
- Matthias Will (1996)
- Helga Griffths (1998)
- Andrea Neumann (2001)
- Klaus Lomnitzer (2005)
- Martin Konietschke (2009)
- Kurt Wilhelm Hoffmann (2013)
- Joachim Kuhlmann (2018)
- Sieglinde Gros (2022)

== Past Recipients (literature) ==
- Ursula Teicher-Maier (1987)
- Mechthild Curtius (1989)
- Iris Anna Otto (1991)
- Susanne Eva Mischke (1995)
- Rainer Wieczorek (1997)
- Silke Andrea Schuemmer (1999)
- Philip Meinhold (2003)
- Peter Kurzeck (2007)
- Andreas Maier (2011)
- Silke Scheuermann (2017)
- Kurt Drawert (2020)
