= Katja Behrens =

German author (1942–2021)

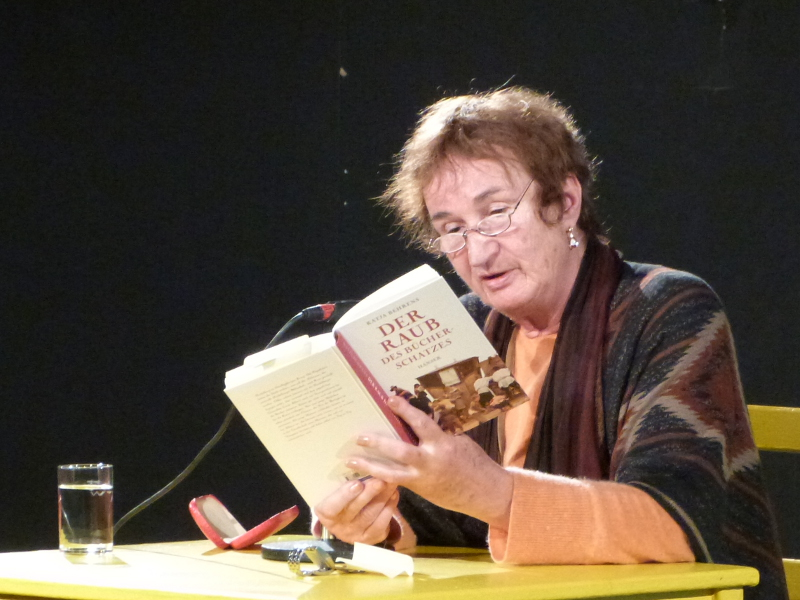
- Born: 18 December 1942 Berlin, Brandenburg, Prussia, Germany
- Died: 6 March 2021 (aged 78) Darmstadt, Hesse, Germany
- Genre: novel, short story, translator

Katja Behrens (born Katja Oswald; 18 December 1942 – 6 March 2021) was a German author and translator of Jewish descent.

== Biography ==
Behrens was the daughter of Josef Oswald, a photographer, and Leni Oswald, an author and journalist. With her mother and grandmother, she went into hiding in the home of a Catholic priest in Austria during World War II and returned to Germany after the war. Behrens began working as a translator in 1960, translating works by authors such as William S. Burroughs, Henry Miller and Kenneth Patchen into German. She lived in Israel from 1968 to 1970. From 1973 to 1978, she was a reader for publisher Luchterhand Literaturverlag, moving to Darmstadt. Behrens has travelled to India, north Africa, the United States and South America. She was a member of the PEN Centre Germany and of the German authors' association Verband deutscher Schriftsteller.

Behrens has been a visiting professor at Washington University in St. Louis and at Dartmouth College.

She has been awarded the Förderpreis by the Festival of German-Language Literature, the Märkisches Stipendium für Literatur, the Thaddäus-Troll-Preis, the stipend from the Villa Massimo, the Mainzer Stadtschreiber by the ZDF and the city of Mainz, the George-Konell-Preis and recognition by the Deutsche Schillerstiftung.

In her writings, she explores the limitations imposed on Jewish women in Germany while accepting that life elsewhere might not be any better. While her literary universe is centred on Germany, she extends her observations to the world at large. Her work also draws on her own experiences to explore the relationships between women of different generations.

She married Peter Behrens in 1960. The couple had a daughter(Toshka) and later divorced in 1971.

== Selected works ==
- Chilenische Erzählungen ("Chilean Stories"), as editor (1977)
- Die weiße Frau ("The White Woman"), short stories (1978)
- Frauenbriefe der Romantik ("Letters by Women of the Romantic Period"), as editor (1981)
- Die dreizehnte Fee ("The Thirteenth Fairy"), novel (1983)
- Abschiedsbriefe ("Farewell Letters"), as editor (1987)
- Im Wasser tanzen, novel (1990)
- Salomo und die anderen—Jüdische Geschichten ("Salomo and the Others—Jewish Stories") (1993)
- Zorro—Im Jahr des Pferdes ("Zorro––In the Year of the Horse"), children's story (1999)
