= Jagoda Marinić =

German journalist, author, TV host and podcaster

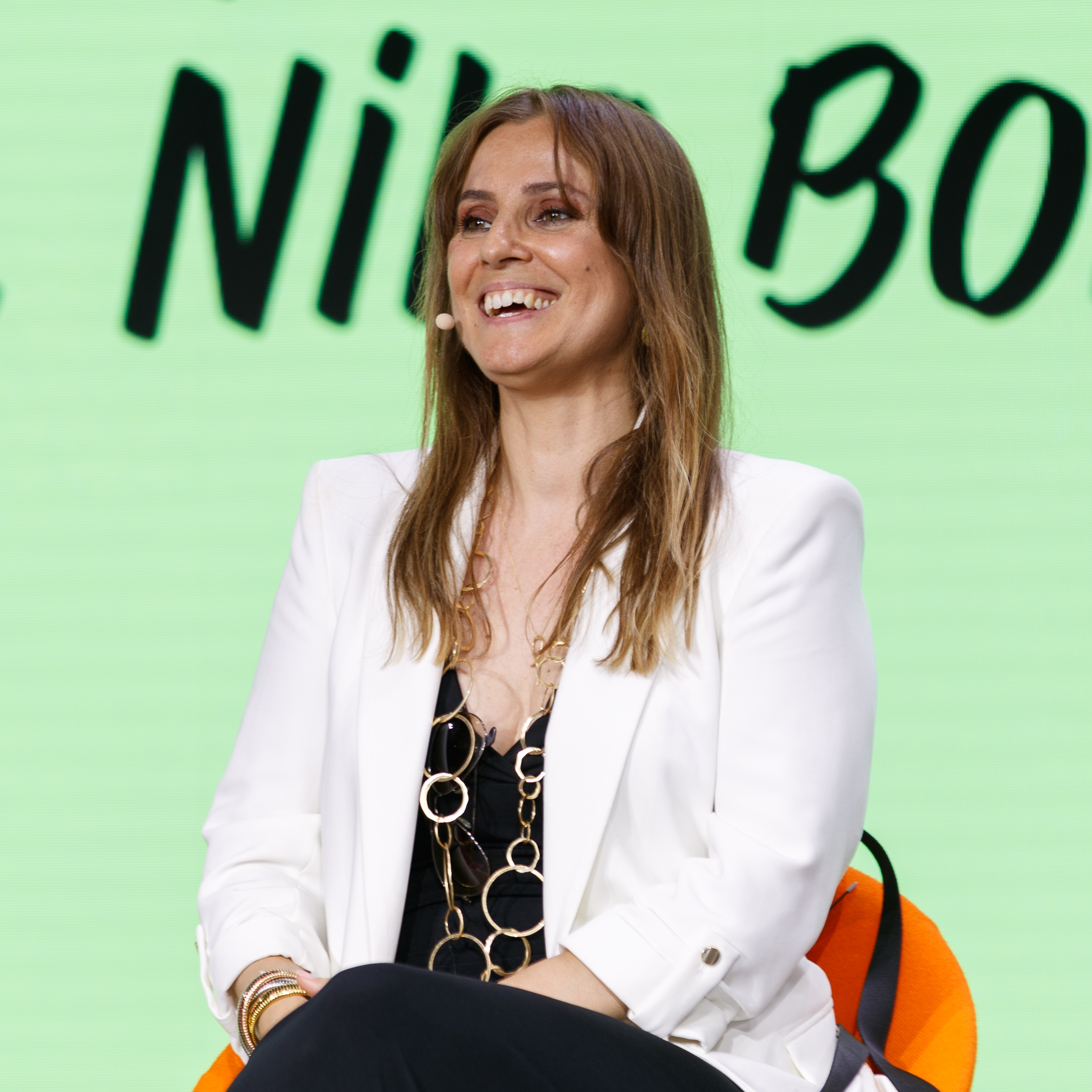
Marinić in 2023

Jagoda Marinić (born September 20, 1977 in Waiblingen) is a novelist, TV host, essayist, journalist, and podcaster from Germany. She speaks and writes in prominent venues about identity, migration, citizenship, and integration. She was named "journalist of the year 2022" in the category "culture" by medium magazin. She was also nominated for the Grimme Prize for her presentation of the arte talk show Das Buch meines Lebens.

== Early life and education ==
Her parents emigrated from Dalmatia in Croatia, SFR Yugoslavia to Germany in the 1970s. She herself was born in Germany, became a German citizen living in Heidelberg. Marinić studied American literature, German literature, and political science at Heidelberg University. Marinić rejects the term migration background.

== Career ==
Marinić's first book of stories, Eigentlich ein Heiratsantrag, [Actually a Marriage Proposal] was published in 2001 and she received the Grimmelshausen-Preis for her 2005 story collection Russische Bücher [Russian Books]. Both collections appeared with Suhrkamp. She published her first novel, Die Namenlose [The No-Name] in 2006. Her second novel, Restaurant Dalmatia was published in 2013 by Hoffmann und Campe and has been widely reviewed. It is set in Toronto, Berlin, and Croatia, and explores the self-awareness and homecomings of uprooted, displaced characters as they gain a sense of identity in a fractured world.

In addition to her fiction writing, she publishes theater reviews and writes op-eds for the Frankfurter Rundschau. Her recent political essays begin as formal lectures. She presented Was ist Deutsch in Deutschland [What is German in Germany], for example, at the 3rd Nürnberg Conference on Integration in 2013. Rassimus sichtbar machen [Making Racism Visible] (2012) addresses the NSU murders, and Wir können alles außer leben [We Can Do Everything But Live] argues for political suffrage for all residents of Germany, especially for those immigrants who helped reconstruct the German economy during the "economic miracle."

In June 2007 Marinić was one of 18 participants in the 31st Festival of German-Language Literature (Ingeborg-Bachmann-Prize) competition in Klagenfurt where she read her story Netzhaut [Retina].

On the occasion of German Unity Day 2026, Marinić was awarded the Federal Order of Merit by Head of State Frank-Walter Steinmeier. In its citation, the Office of the Federal President emphasizes that Marinić succeeds in “[…] creating spaces in which cultural education, dialogue, and democratic coexistence are lived. Through her broad civic engagement, Jagoda Marinić has earned distinction for fostering cohesion in her hometown and far beyond.”

== Other activities ==
Marinić has been a member of the PEN Centre Germany since 2012. She regularly leads writing workshops for children and students. In 2012 she became founding director of the "Interkulturelles Zentrum in Gründung" in Heidelberg. Marinić is a member of the Interkulturellen Rat in Deutschland e. V. She is on the board and serves as speaker for the Stiftung Internationale Wochen gegen Rassismus. She serves UNESCO by working on the Intangible Cultural Heritage project for Germany and with the UNESCO City of Literature project for Heidelberg. She is also a member of the jury for the Stuttgart Intercultural Culture Project. In fall 2015 she accepted a week-long position as Writer-in-Residence at Davidson College, supported by the German Embassy in Washington, D.C. In this context she held a speech at Davidson College, called "What we talk about when we talk about us. How the American Dream turned German - A lecture on Refugees, Migration, Integration and Citizenship in Germany on the occasion of 25 Years of German Unity".

== Works ==
- Eigentlich ein Heiratsantrag. Geschichten, Suhrkamp, Frankfurt am Main 2001, ISBN 3-518-45516-8
- Russische Bücher. Erzählungen, Suhrkamp, Frankfurt am Main 2005, ISBN 3-518-41696-0
- Die Namenlose. Roman, Nagel & Kimche, Zürich 2007, ISBN 9783312003983
- Alles macht mich aus. Interview. In: BELLA triste Nr. 19, Hildesheim 2007
- Gebrauchsanweisung für Kroatien, Piper, München 2013, ISBN 9783492276290
- Restaurant Dalmatia. Roman, Hoffmann und Campe, Hamburg 2013, ISBN 978-3-455-40457-9
- Made in Germany: Was ist deutsch in Deutschland Hoffmann und Campe, Hamburg 2016, ISBN 978-3-455-50402-6
- Sheroes. Neue Held*innen braucht das Land. S. Fischer, Frankfurt am Main 2019, ISBN 978-3-10-397453-9
- Sanfte Radikalität. Zwischen Hoffnung und Wandel. S. Fischer, Frankfurt am Main 2024, ISBN 978-3-10-397674-8

== Recognition ==
Marinić received the Hermann-Lenz-Stipendium scholarship in 1999 and Kunststiftung Baden-Württemberg prize for young authors (Förderpreis) in 2003. Her play Zalina was recognized with the award for excellence for the "best program of the year for the cultural capital Hermannstadt" in 2007. 2008 she was Scout for Heidelberger Stückemarkt, host state was Croatia. Her play Wer war Kitty Genovese? [Who Was Kitty Genovese?] was nominated for the Leonhard Frank Prize in 2011. She was named "journalist of the year 2022" in the category "culture" by medium magazin . She was also nominated for the Grimme Prize for her presentation of the arte talk show Das Buch meines Lebens.
