= Grimmelshausen Prize =

German literary award

- Native name: Grimmelshausen-Preis
- Country: Germany
- Hosted by: Hesse, Baden-Württemberg; Renchen, Gelnhausen
- Reward: €10,000
- First award: 1993
- Website: renchen.de (in German)

Grimmelshausen Prize (German: Grimmelshausen-Preis) is a literary prize in Germany, which is awarded since 1993 on every two years. The prize is named after Hans Jakob Christoffel von Grimmelshausen, author of Simplicius Simplicissimus, a famous German book. The prize money is €10,000, the prize cannot be split.

The award is given to authors who, "in the previous six years, have made a remarkable contribution to the artistic examination of contemporary history through a narrative work".

== Structures ==
The founders are the cities of Gelnhausen and Renchen and the federal states of Baden-Württemberg and Hesse. It is not possible to apply for the prize. A three-member jury of experts, each elected for a term of six years, decides on the award.

It is presented annually, alternating between Gelnhausen and Renchen, by the mayor of the respective city at a public ceremony, which was first held in Renchen in 1993. The costs incurred are covered by the city in which the prize is awarded. Since 2003, the Grimmelshausen Prize has also been awarded to authors who are not yet established.

== Laureates ==
- 1993: Ruth Klüger – weiter leben
- 1995: Alban Nikolai Herbst – Wolpertinger oder Das Blau
- 1997: Michael Köhlmeier – Telemach
- 1999: Robert Menasse – Schubumkehr
- 2001: Adolf Muschg – Sutters Glück
- 2003: Brigitte Kronauer – Teufelsbrück; sponsorship award: Ricarda Junge – Silberfaden
- 2005: Dieter Forte – Auf der anderen Seite der Welt; sponsorship award: Jagoda Marinić – Russische Bücher
- 2007: Feridun Zaimoğlu – Leyla; sponsorship award: Silke Scheuermann – Die Stunde zwischen Hund und Wolf
- 2009: Reinhard Jirgl – Die Stille; sponsorship award: Claudia Gabler – Die kleinen Raubtiere unter ihrem Pelz
- 2011: Peter Kurzeck – Vorabend; Förderpreis: Annika Scheffel – Ben
- 2013: Ulrike Edschmid – Das Verschwinden des Philip S.; sponsorship award: Marie T. Martin – Luftpost
- 2015: Robert Seethaler – Ein ganzes Leben; sponsorship award: Verena Boos – Blutorangen
- 2017: Christoph Hein – Glückskind mit Vater; sponsorship award: Sophie Passmann – Monologe angehender Psychopathen
- 2019: Dörte Hansen – Mittagsstunde; sponsorship award: Nele Pollatschek – Das Unglück anderer Leute
- 2021: Christoph Nußbaumeder – Die Unverhofften; sponsorship award: Sheree Domingo – Ferngespräch
- 2023: Frank P. Meyer – Vom Ende der Bundeskegelbahn; sponsorship award: Caroline Wahl – 22 Bahnen
- 2025: Jakob Hein – Wie Grischa mit einer verwegenen Idee beinahe den Weltfrieden auslöste; sponsorship award: Charlotte Gneuß – Gittersee
