= Hölty Prize =

German literary award

The Hölty Prize (German: Hölty-Preis), established in 2007, is a lifetime achievement award given every two years to honor a German-language poet. The full name of the prize is the Hölty-Preis für Lyrik der Landeshauptstadt und der Sparkasse Hannover (Hölty Poetry Prize of the State Capital and the Savings Bank of Hanover). With a purse of €20,000, it is one of the most generous literary prizes in Germany. The prize is named for Ludwig Christoph Heinrich Hölty (1748–1776), a German poet closely associated with the region of Hanover.

== Recipients ==
- 2008: Thomas Rosenlöcher
- 2010: Paulus Böhmer
- 2012: Christian Lehnert
- 2014: Silke Scheuermann
- 2016: Christoph Meckel
- 2018: Norbert Hummelt
- 2020: Marion Poschmann
- 2022: Ulrich Koch
- 2024: Alexandru Bulucz
