= Peter Kurzeck =

German author

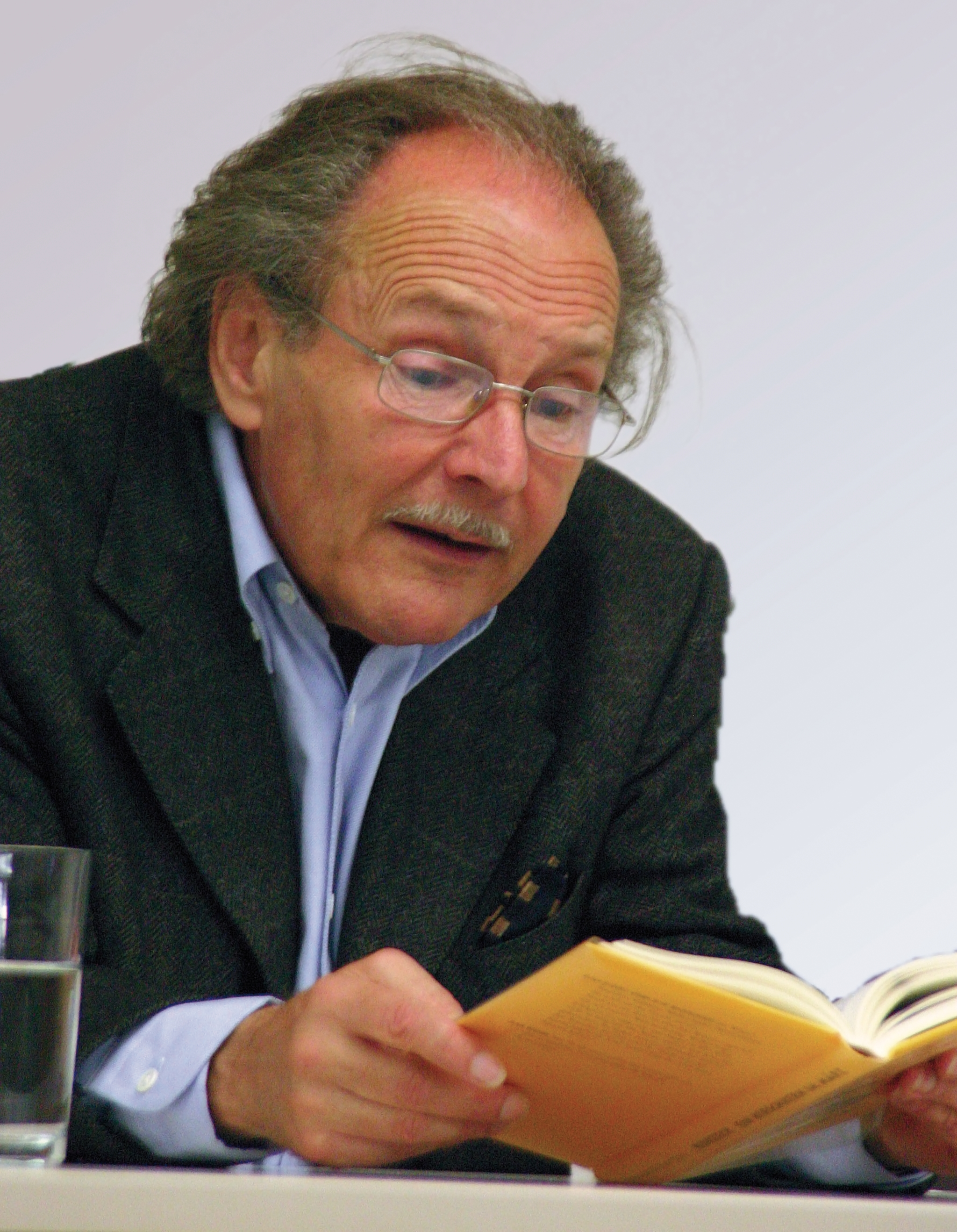
- Kurzeck at a reading in 2005
- Born: 10 June 1943; Tachau, Reichsgau Sudetenland, Nazi Germany
- Died: 25 November 2013 (aged 70); Frankfurt am Main, Hesse, Germany
- Occupation: Writer
- Children: At least 1; Carina
- Awards: See Awards

Signature
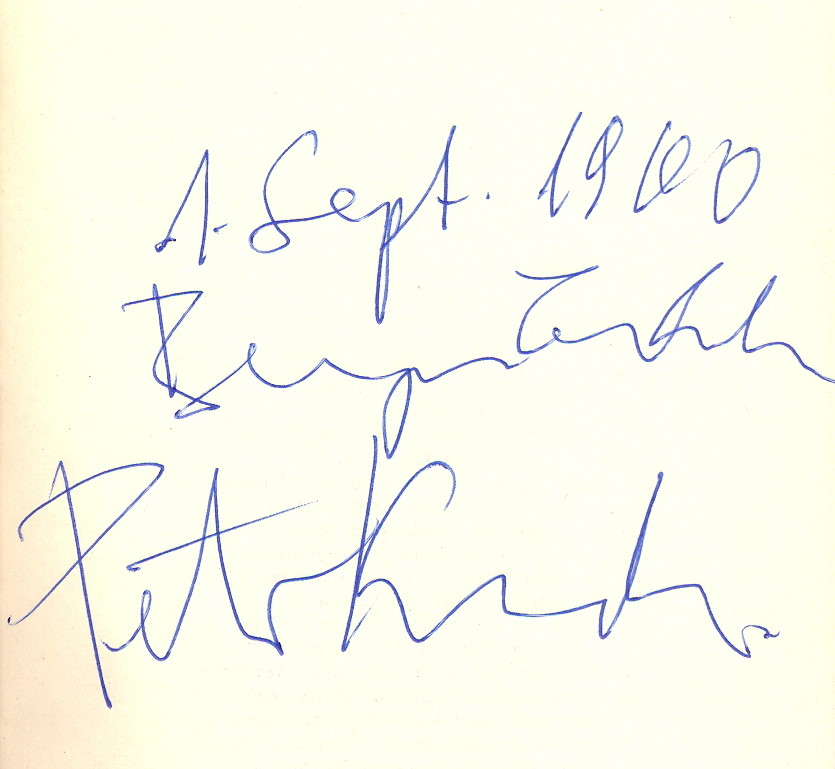

Peter Kurzeck (10 June 1943 – 25 November 2013) was a German writer.

== Life ==
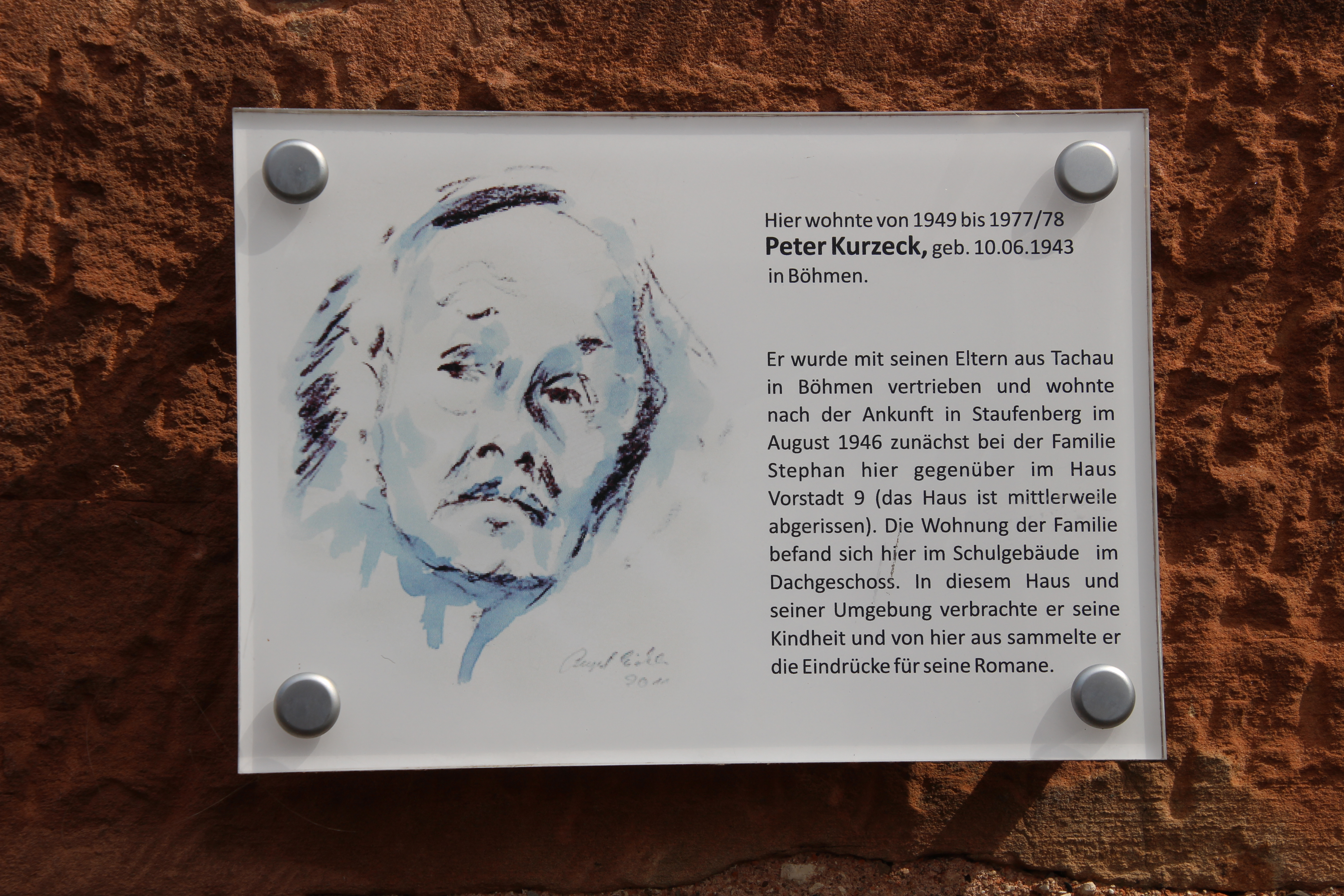
Notice board at the former house of Kurzeck in Staufenberg diagonally across from Peter-Kurzeck-Platz

Peter Kurzeck was born on 10 June 1943, in Tachau, Reichsgau Sudetenland, Nazi Germany. In 1946, his family moved to Germany and Kurzeck was raised in Staufenberg near Giessen, Hesse. As a young man, he wrote for local newspapers and magazines. In 1977, he moved to Frankfurt am Main, Hesse, Germany. Since the mid-1990s, Kurzeck has been working on a multi-volume autobiographical novel project entitled Das alte Jahrhundert (The Old Century) which, according to its narrative framework, is based in Frankfurt am Main in 1984.

He died on 25 November 2013, in Frankfurt am Main.

=== Legacy ===
Kurzeck's daughter Carina inherited the rights to his work. While most of his books were previously published by Stroemfeld Verlag, in December 2018 a change of publisher to Verlag Schöffling & Co. was announced, which is to bring out four more estate volumes.

== Works ==
- Der Nußbaum gegenüber vom Laden, in dem du dein Brot kaufst. Stroemfeld/Roter Stern, Basel/Frankfurt am Main 1979, ISBN 3-87877-127-4.
- Das schwarze Buch. Stroemfeld/Roter Stern, Basel/Frankfurt am Main 1982, ISBN 3-87877-171-1.
- Kein Frühling. Stroemfeld/Roter Stern, Basel/Frankfurt am Main 1987, ISBN 3-87877-274-2. Erweiterte Neuauflage 2007, ISBN 978-3-87877-857-8.
- Keiner stirbt. Stroemfeld/Roter Stern, Basel/Frankfurt am Main 1990, ISBN 3-87877-324-2.
- Mein Bahnhofsviertel. Stroemfeld/Roter Stern, Basel/Frankfurt am Main 1991, ISBN 3-87877-385-4.
- Vor den Abendnachrichten. Wunderhorn, Heidelberg 1996, ISBN 3-88423-108-1.
- Übers Eis. Stroemfeld/Roter Stern, Basel/Frankfurt am Main 1997, ISBN 3-87877-580-6.
- Als Gast. Stroemfeld/Roter Stern, Basel/Frankfurt am Main 2003, ISBN 3-87877-825-2.
- Ein Kirschkern im März. Stroemfeld/Roter Stern, Frankfurt am Main/Basel 2004, ISBN 3-87877-935-6.
- Oktober und wer wir selbst sind. Stroemfeld/Roter Stern, Frankfurt am Main/Basel 2007, ISBN 978-3-87877-053-4.
- Vorabend. Stroemfeld/Roter Stern, Frankfurt am Main/Basel 2011, ISBN 978-3-86600-079-7.
- Bis er kommt. Stroemfeld/Roter Stern, Frankfurt am Main/Basel 2015, ISBN 978-386600-090-2.
- Der vorige Sommer und der Sommer davor. Schöffling & Co., Frankfurt am Main 2019, ISBN 978-3-89561-692-1.
- Kommt kein Zirkus ins Dorf? (Hörspiel, HR 1987), Edition Literarischer Salon im Focus Verlag, Gießen 1987.
- Der Sonntagsspaziergang. (Hörspiel, HR 1992).
- Stuhl, Tisch, Lampe. supposé, Köln 2004. (Hörbuch-CD).
- Ein Sommer, der bleibt. Peter Kurzeck erzählt das Dorf seiner Kindheit. Konzeption und Regie: Klaus Sander. Erzähler: Peter Kurzeck. supposé, Berlin 2007. (4-CD-Box).
- Peter Kurzeck liest aus „Kein Frühling“. Stroemfeld Verlag, Frankfurt am Main 2007. (Hörbuch, 4 CDs).
- Peter Kurzeck liest „Oktober und wer wir selbst sind“. Stroemfeld Verlag, Frankfurt am Main 2008. (Hörbuch, 7 CDs).
- Da fährt mein Zug. Peter Kurzeck erzählt. Konzeption und Regie: Klaus Sander. Erzähler: Peter Kurzeck. supposé, Berlin 2010, ISBN 978-3-932513-92-3. (Audio-CD).
- Mein wildes Herz. Peter Kurzeck erzählt. Konzeption und Regie: Klaus Sander. Erzähler: Peter Kurzeck. supposé, Berlin 2011, ISBN 978-3-932513-98-5. (2 Audio-CDs).
- „Unerwartet Marseille.“ Peter Kurzeck erzählt. Stroemfeld Verlag, Frankfurt am Main 2012. (Hörbuch, 2 CDs).
- Für immer. Peter Kurzeck erzählt sein Schreiben. Konzeption und Regie: Klaus Sander. Erzähler: Peter Kurzeck. supposé, Berlin 2016, ISBN 978-3-86385-014-2. (Audio-CD).
- Ralph Schock, „Wenn ich schreibe, kann mir nichts passieren.“ Gespräch mit Peter Kurzeck. In: Sinn und Form, 5/2011, S. 624–633.

== Awards ==
- 1988: Literaturpreis des Landkreises Gießen
- 1989: Stipendium Künstlerhaus Edenkoben
- 1989: Kunstpreis der Stadt Cloppenburg
- 1991: Alfred-Döblin-Preis
- 1992: Stipendium Künstlerhof Schreyahn
- 1994: Joseph-Breitbach-Preis
- 1995: Kester-Haeusler-Ehrengabe der Deutschen Schillerstiftung
- 1999: Großer Literaturpreis der Bayerischen Akademie der Schönen Künste
- 2000: Hans-Erich-Nossack-Preis
- 2000/2001: Stadtschreiber von Bergen
- 2004: Preis der Literaturhäuser
- 2004: Kranichsteiner Literaturpreis
- 2006: George-Konell-Preis der Landeshauptstadt Wiesbaden
- 2007: Georg-Christoph-Lichtenberg-Preis
- 2007: Calwer Hermann-Hesse-Stipendium
- 2008: Goetheplakette der Stadt Frankfurt am Main
- 2008: Moldaustipendium
- 2009: "Hörbuch des Jahres 2008" of the hr2-Hörbuchbestenliste for Ein Sommer, der bleibt – Peter Kurzeck erzählt das Dorf seiner Kindheit
- 2010: Robert-Gernhardt-Förderpreis for the novel Vorabend, the fifth volume of his autobiographical chronicle Das alte Jahrhundert
- 2011: Honorary citizen of the City of Staufenberg
- 2011: Grimmelshausen-Preis
- 2011: Werner-Bergengruen-Preis
- 2013: Großer Sudetendeutscher Kulturpreis
- 2014: Place of the former Schule von Staufenberg (school of Staufenberg) was named to Peter-Kurzeck-Platz.

== Literature ==
- Mechthild Curtius: Peter Kurzeck „Zwangsvorstellung: Dass ich nichts vergessen darf!“ Interview, in: Dies. (Hrsg.): Autorengespräche. Verwandlung der Wirklichkeit. Fischer, Frankfurt am Main 1991, ISBN 978-3-596-10256-3. S. 155–168.
- Jörg Magenau: Die Suche nach der verlorenen Zeit. Peter Kurzecks Romane „Kein Frühling“ und „Keiner stirbt“. In: Walter Delabar, Erhard Schütz (Hrsg.): Deutschsprachige Literatur der 70er und 80er Jahre. Darmstadt 1997, S. 236–253.
- Sabine Sistig: Wandel der Ich-Identität in der Postmoderne? Zeit und Erzählen in Wolfgang Hilbigs „Ich“ und Peter Kurzecks „Keiner stirbt“. Königshausen u. Neumann, Würzburg 2003, ISBN 3-8260-2361-7 (= Epistemata/Reihe Literaturwissenschaft, 407.).
- Beate Tröger: Gehen, um zu schreiben. Peter Kurzecks autobiographisches Romanprojekt. In: Hans Richard Brittnacher, Magnus Klaue (Hrsg.): Unterwegs. Zur Poetik des Vagabundentums im 20. Jahrhundert. Böhlau, Köln/Weimar/Wien 2008. S. 261–276.
- „Sowieso verlauf ich mich gern!“ Gehen, Fehl-Gehen und Umwege als strukturgebendes Element bei Peter Kurzeck. In: Matthias Däumer, Maren Lickhardt, Christian Riedel, Christine Waldschmidt (Hg.): Irrwege. Zu Ästhetik und Hermeneutik des Fehlgehens. Winter, Heidelberg 2010, S. 233–249 (= Studien zur historischen Poetik, 5).
- Maria Kuwilsky: Autopoietiken im Medium Literatur als Gedächtnis von Gegenwart und Zeit. Beobachtungen von Arno Schmidt, Uwe Johnson, Walter Kempowski und Peter Kurzeck. Egon Verlag, Würzburg 2013, ISBN 978-3-89913-986-0.
- Christian Riedel / Matthias Bauer (Hrsg.): Text + Kritik 199. Peter Kurzeck. edition text + kritik, München 2013. ISBN 978-3-86916-256-0.
- Christian Riedel: Peter Kurzecks Erzählkosmos. Idylle – Romantik – Blues. Aisthesis, Bielefeld 2016, ISBN 978-3-8498-1162-4 (= Philologie und Kulturgeschichte, Bd. 3).
