= Mainzer Stadtschreiber =

German literary award

The Mainzer Stadtschreiber (City clerk in Mainz) is an annual German literature award. It is awarded by ZDF, 3sat and the city of Mainz and was founded in 1984. The award is endowed with €12,500. Additionally the laureate receives the right to live in the town clerk's domicile in the Gutenberg Museum in Mainz for one year. Together with ZDF, the recipient is able to produce a documentary based on a free choice of topic.

== Recipients ==
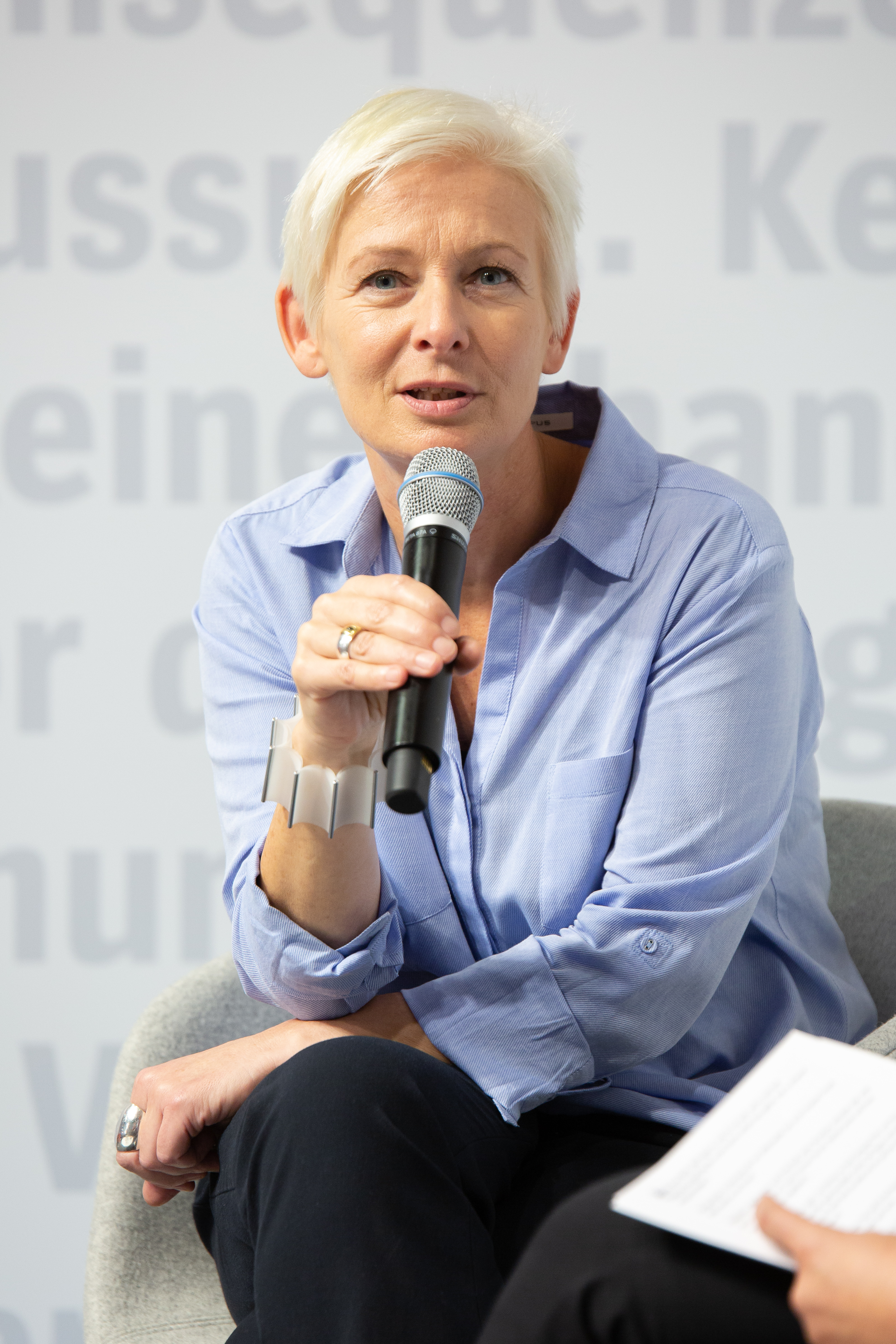
Dörte Hansen (Stadtschreiberin 2022)

- 1985 Gabriele Wohmann
- 1986 H. C. Artmann
- 1987 Ludwig Harig
- 1988 Sarah Kirsch
- 1989 Horst Bienek
- 1990 Günter Kunert
- 1991 Helga Schütz
- 1992 Katja Behrens
- 1993 Dieter Kühn
- 1994 Libuše Moníková
- 1995 Peter Härtling
- 1996 Peter Bichsel
- 1997 Friedrich Christian Delius
- 1998 Erich Loest
- 1999 Tilman Spengler
- 2000/2001 Hanns-Josef Ortheil
- 2002 Katja Lange-Müller
- 2003 Urs Widmer
- 2004 Raoul Schrott
- 2005 Sten Nadolny
- 2006 Patrick Roth
- 2007 Ilija Trojanow
- 2008 Michael Kleeberg
- 2009 Monika Maron
- 2010 Josef Haslinger
- 2011 Ingo Schulze
- 2012 Kathrin Röggla
- 2013 Peter Stamm
- 2014 Judith Schalansky
- 2015 Feridun Zaimoğlu
- 2016 Clemens Meyer
- 2017 Abbas Khider
- 2018 Anna Katharina Hahn
- 2019 Eva Menasse
- 2020/2021 Eugen Ruge
- 2022 Dörte Hansen
- 2023 Alois Hotschnig
- 2024 Julia Schoch
- 2025 Annett Gröschner
- 2026 Sven Regener
