= Hörbuchbestenliste =

Literary award

Hörbuchbestenliste (Audiobook Bestseller List) is a literary prize of Germany, in collaboration with hr2 and Börsenblatt.

The audiobook bestseller lists are compiled by two independent juries: one for adult audiobooks and one for children's and young adult audiobooks. Once a month, the juries select five productions for adults and three productions for children and young adults from among the new releases that they consider particularly worth listening to. All jury members receive a copy of each production, which they can rate on a scale of 0 to 10 points (or 0 to 6 points for audiobooks for children and young adults). Titles with the highest scores then appear on the monthly list. In addition, on a rotating monthly basis, one of the jury members submits a "personal recommendation," which is also included in the list. Based on the 12 monthly rankings, two audiobooks are selected as "Audiobook of the Year" each time — one for adults and, since 1998, one for children and young adults.

The "Audiobook of the Year" award comes with a prize of 3,333 euros and is currently (as of 2026) presented in October during the "hr2 Audiobook Night" in the broadcast hall of Hessischer Rundfunk in Frankfurt am Main. The award ceremony for the "Children's and Young Adult Audiobook of the Year" takes place every January at the conclusion of the hr2 Audio Festival in Wiesbaden as part of a children's audio gala at the Hessisches Staatstheater Wiesbaden. The prize, known as the "KiWi – Children's and Young Adult Audiobook Prize of the State Capital Wiesbaden," comes with a cash award of 10,000 euros.

== Hörbücher des Jahres – Audiobooks of the Year ==
- 1997: Zeugnis ablegen. Die Tagebücher des Victor Klemperer 1933–1945. ca. 5 h 30 min., Der Audio Verlag, Berlin/DeutschlandRadio
- 1998: Bertolt Brecht: Werke – Eine Auswahl. ca. 18 Std., BMG/ARIS
- 1999: Michail Bulgakow: Der Meister und Margarita. ca. 12 h 30 min., Der Hörverlag/mdr
- 2000: Hans Magnus Enzensberger: Das Wasserzeichen der Poesie. ca. 140 min., Eichborn Verlag/hr2
- 2001: The Spoken Arts Treasury. ca. 890 Min., Der Hörverlag
- 2002: Vladimir Nabokov: Pnin. ca. 420 Min., Der Audio Verlag/SFB
- 2003: Kinski spricht Werke der Weltliteratur. Sprecher: Klaus Kinski. 20 CDs, Deutsche Grammophon/Klaus Kinski Productions
- 2004: Gottfried Benn: Das Hörwerk 1928–1956. ca. 11 h, Zweitausendeins/BR, DLR, DRS, hr, NDR, radiobremen, rbb, SWR, WDR
- 2005: Rolf Dieter Brinkmann: Wörter Sex Schnitt. 5 CDs, Intermedium Records/BR
- 2006: Ror Wolf: Gesammelte Fußballhörspiele. 4 CDs, Intermedium Records/Strunz!, BR, SWR, hr2, WDR
- 2007: Peter Weiss: Die Ästhetik des Widerstands. 12 CDs, Der Hörverlag/BR, WDR
- 2008: Peter Kurzeck: Ein Sommer, der bleibt – Peter Kurzeck erzählt das Dorf seiner Kindheit. 4 CDs, Verlag supposé
- 2009: Christiane Collorio, Peter Hamm, Harald Hartung, Michael Krüger (Hrsg.): Lyrikstimmen – Die Bibliothek der Poeten. 9 CDs, Der Hörverlag
- 2010: Marcel Proust: Auf der Suche nach der verlorenen Zeit (Gesamtausgabe). Sprecher: Peter Matić. 17 MP3-CDs. ca. 156 Std. Der Hörverlag
- 2011: Josef Bierbichler: Mittelreich. Sprecher: Josef Bierbichler. 10 CDs. 12 h 7 min. DAV/Bayern2.
- 2012: James Joyce: Ulysses. Hörverlag/SWR, DLF, Regie: Klaus Buhlert, Dramaturgie: Manfred Hess, 23 CDs
- 2013: Paul Plamper: Der Kauf. WDR/BR/DLF/Schauspiel, Köln, 1 CD (68 min.), ISBN 978-3-941998-62-9
- 2014: Dieter Wellershoff: Ans Ende kommen – Dieter Wellershoff erzählt über Altern und Sterben. supposé, 1 CD (66 min.), ISBN 978-3-86385-009-8
- 2015: Ulrike Janssen, Norbert Wehr (Hrsg.): Thomas Kling – Die gebrannte Performance. Schriftenreihe der Kunststiftung NRW im Lilienfeld Verlag, 4 CDs (4 h 20 min.), ISBN 978-3-940357-49-6
- 2016: John Dos Passos: Manhattan Transfer. SWR2/DLF, Hörbuch Hamburg
- 2017: Friederike Mayröcker (Text) und Lesch Schmidt (Musik): Requiem für Ernst Jandl.(requiem for Ernst Jandl) speak low
- 2018: Wolfgang Herrndorf: Bilder deiner großen Liebe, 1 CD (1 h 11 min.)
- 2019: Annie Ernaux: Die Jahre (The Years), DAV/hr2-kultur, 1 CD.
- 2020: Thomas Pynchon: Die Enden der Parabel, SWR2, 13 CDs.
- 2021: Saal 101 – Das Dokumentarhörspiel zum NSU-Prozess. BR2/ARD; der Hörverlag, 12 CDs.
- 2022: Robert Musil: Nachlass zu Lebzeiten.
- 2023: Kai Grehn: Mögen Sie Emily Dickinson?
- 2024: Uwe Johnson: Jahrestage – Aus dem Leben von Gesine Cresspahl. Der Audio Verlag (73 h 53 min)
- 2025: Thomas Brasch: Das Unvereinbare in ein Gedicht. Interpretiert von Lars Eidinger, musikalisch begleitet von George Kranz. Kulturmanufaktur / Dussmann das Kulturkaufhaus (1 h 23 min.)
- 2026: Joachim Meyerhoff: Man kann auch in die Höhe fallen. argon Verlag (12 h 43 min.)

== Audiobooks for Children and Youth ==
- 1998: A. A. Milne: Pu der Bär – Teil 1 bis 6. ca. 380 Min., Kein&Aber Records
- 1999: Marjaleena Lembcke: Als die Steine noch Vögel waren. ca. 100 Min., Uccello Verlag
- 2000: J. K. Rowling: Harry Potter, 3 volumes Der Hörverlag
- 2001: Frantz Wittkamp: Du bist da, und ich bin hier. ca. 37 Min., Hörcompany
- 2002: Mirjam Pressler: Malka Mai. ca. 210 Min., Der Hörverlag
- 2003: Paul Maar: Lippels Traum. 4 CDs, Deutsche Grammophon
- 2004: Kate DiCamillo: Despereaux. Von einem der auszog das Fürchten zu verlernen. 3 CDs, Hörcompany
- 2005: Kate DiCamillo: Winn-Dixie. 2 CDs, Hörcompany
- 2006: Dolf Verroen: Wie schön weiß ich bin. 1 CD, Hörcompany
- 2007: Guus Kuijer: Das Buch von allen Dingen. 2 CDs, Oetinger Audio
- 2008: Andreas Steinhöfel: Rico, Oskar und die Tieferschatten. Sprecher: Andreas Steinhöfel. 4 CDs, Hörbuch Hamburg/Silberfisch
- 2009: Marie-Aude Murail: Simpel. Sprecher: Martin Baltscheit. 4 CDs, Hörcompany
- 2010: Bibi Dumon Tak: Kuckuck, Krake, Kakerlake: das etwas andere Tierhörbuch. Sprecher: Andreas Fröhlich, Leslie Malton, Felix von Manteuffel, Patrick Bach, Oliver Rohrbeck, Anne Helm u. a., 1 CD, Oetinger Media
- 2011: Salah Naoura: Matti und Sami und die drei größten Fehler des Universums Sprecher: Martin Baltscheit. 2 CDs (ca. 140 Min.), Hörcompany
- 2012: John Green: Das Schicksal ist ein mieser Verräter. wefwe, 5 CDs, Hörbuch Hamburg, Silberfisch
- 2013: Annette Pehnt: Der Bärbeiß. Hörbuch Hamburg, Silberfisch, gesprochen von Katharina Thalbach, 1 CD (87 Min.), ISBN 978-3-86742-709-8
- 2014: Martin Baltscheit: Nur 1 Tag. Oetinger audio, 1 CD (41 Min.), ISBN 978-3-8373-0764-1
- 2015: Ulf Nilsson: Kommissar Gordon – Der erste Fall. (Detective Gordon: The First Case) Headroom, 1 CD (60 Min.), ISBN 978-3-942175-46-3
- 2016: Torben Kuhlmann: Lindbergh – Die abenteuerliche Geschichte einer fliegenden Maus. hr2-kultur, Der Hörverlag
- 2017: Kai Pannen: Mach die Biege, Fliege! headroom
- 2018: Martin Muser: Kannawoniwasein! Manchmal muss man einfach verduften. 2 CDs (2 h 19 min)
- 2019: Lois Lowry: Die schreckliche Geschichte der abscheulichen Familie Willoughby. 2 CDs.
- 2020: Onjali Q. Raúf: Der Junge aus der letzten Reihe,(The Boy at the Back of the Class) 4 CDs.
- 2021: Michael Gerard Bauer: Dinge, die so nicht bleiben können. Hörcompany
- 2022: Alan Gratz: Vor uns das Meer.
- 2023: Varsha Shah: Ajay und die Tintenhelden.
- 2024: Kimberly Brubaker Bradley: Gras unter meinen Füßen
- 2025: Tom Percival: Der Junge in den falschen Schuhen. Argon Verlag / Sauerländer Audio (5 h 5 min.)
- 2026: Anna Dimitrova: Kanak Kids – Halb angepasst und voll dazwischen. argon Verlag (10 h 4 min.)
