= Christoph Meckel =

German artist and writer (1935–2020)

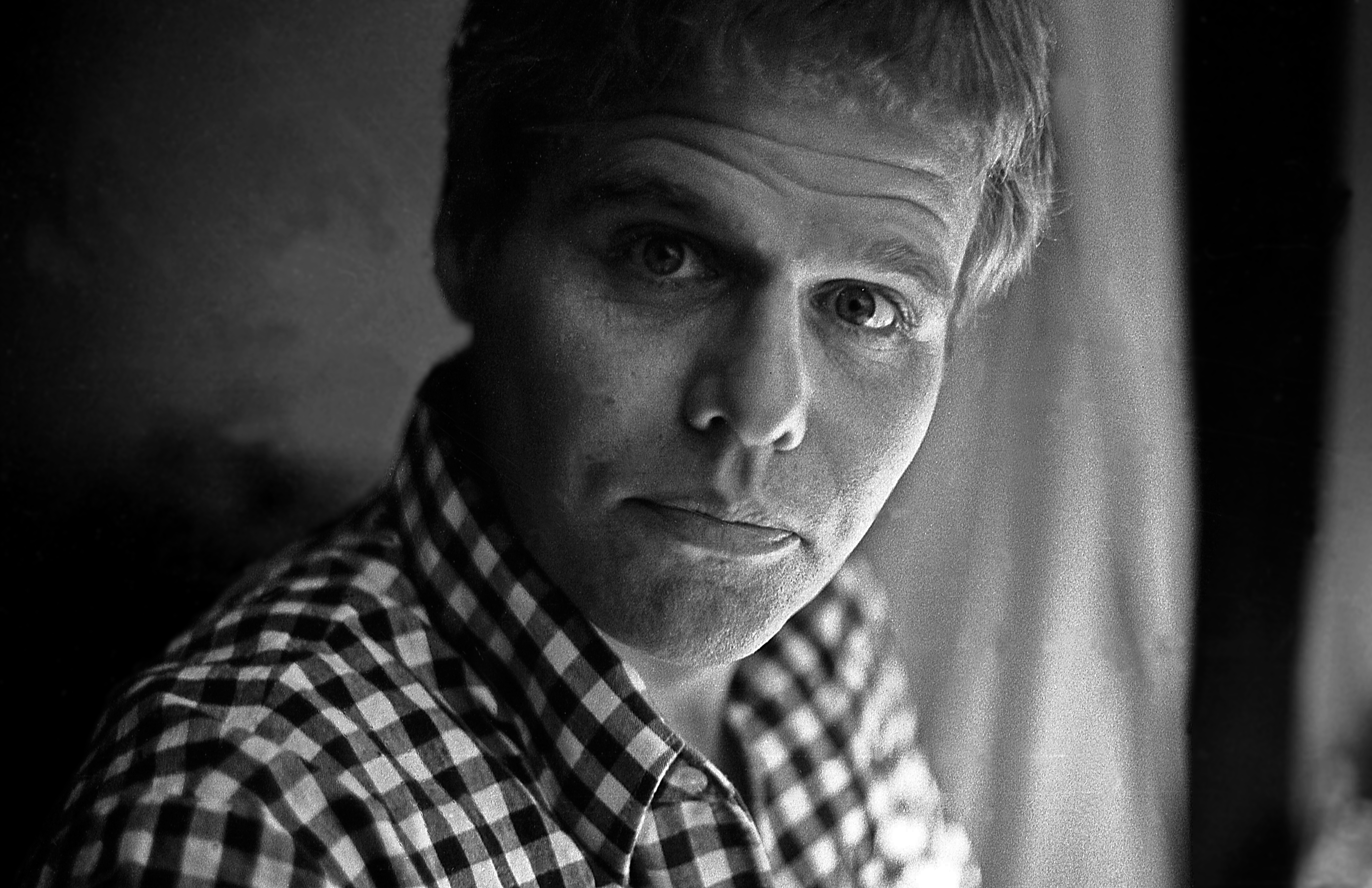
- Meckel in 1974
- Born: 12 June 1935; Berlin, Nazi Germany
- Died: 29 January 2020 (aged 84); Freiburg im Breisgau, Baden-Württemberg, Germany
- Occupations: Writer; Poet; Graphic artist
- Awards: Kasseler Literaturpreis; Josef Breitbach Prize; Hölty Prize; Antiquaria Prize

Christoph Meckel (12 June 1935 – 29 January 2020) was a German author and graphic artist. He received awards for his works which connect illustrations with the written text, sometimes texts by others.

== Life ==
Born in Berlin, Meckel spent his youth there, in Erfurt and in Freiburg im Breisgau, where he attended Gymnasium. In 1954/55 he studied graphic art at the Academy of Art in Freiburg im Breisgau, and in 1956 at the Academy of Art in Munich. Since 1956 he worked as both an author and graphic artist. His first poem appeared that year. He traveled extensively through Europe, Africa, and America and lived in Oetingen in Markgräflerland, in Berlin, in southern France, and in Tuscany.

His graphic work has appeared in numerous exhibitions. Until his withdrawal in 1997, Meckel was a member of the PEN Center of the Federal Republic of Germany. He was a member of the Akademie der Wissenschaften und der Literatur in Mainz and the Deutschen Akademie für Sprache und Dichtung in Darmstadt.

In her book "For Your Own Good: Hidden Cruelty in Childrearing and the Roots of Violence" Alice Miller provides quotes of Meckel on his childhood: Punishment followed on a grand scale. For ten days, an unconscionable length of time, my father blessed the palms of his child's outstretched four-year-old hands with a sharp twitch. Seven strokes a day on each hand: that makes one hundred and forty strokes and then some. This put an end to the child's innocence. Whatever it was that happened in Paradise involving Adam, Eve, Lilith, the serpent, and the apple, the well-deserved Biblical thunderbolt of prehistoric times, the roar of the Almighty and His pointed finger signifying expulsion – I know nothing about all that. It was my father who drove me out of paradise.

Meckel died in Freiburg im Breisgau on 29 January 2020, aged 84.

== Awards ==
Meckel received numerous literary prizes, including:

- 1959 Immermann Prize
- 1966 Preis Junge Generation of the Berliner Kunstpreis
- 1974 Reinhold-Schneider-Preis
- 1978 Rainer-Maria-Rilke-Preis für Lyrik
- 1981 Literaturpreis der Stadt Bremen, Ernst-Meister-Preis für Lyrik
- 1982 Georg Trakl Prize
- 1993 Kasseler Literaturpreis
- 2003 Joseph-Breitbach-Preis
- 2005 Schiller Ring of the Deutsche Schillerstiftung, Weimar
- 2006 International Literary Award Novi Sad (Serbia)
- 2016 Hölty Prize, Hanover
- 2018 Johann-Peter-Hebel-Preis
- 2020 Antiquaria Prize

== Works ==
- Tarnkappe, Munich 1956
- Hotel für Schlafwandler, Stierstadt im Taunus 1958
- Moël, Hamburg [u.a.] 1959
- Nebelhörner, Stuttgart 1959
- Der Krieg, Hamburg [u.a.] 1960
- Manifest der Toten, Stierstadt im Taunus 1960
- Die Stadt, Hamburg [u.a.] 1960
- Welttheater, Hamburg [u.a.] 1960
- Im Land der Umbramauten, Stuttgart 1961
- Der Turm, Hamburg [u.a.] 1961
- Wildnisse, Frankfurt 1962
- Dunkler Sommer und Musikantenknochen, Berlin 1964
- Gedichtbilderbuch, Stierstadt im Taunus 1964
- Gwili und Punk, Groningen 1965
- Lyrik, Prosa, Graphik aus zehn Jahren, Munich 1965
- Das Meer, Munich 1965
- Tullipan, Berlin 1965
- Die Savannen, Bonn 1966
- Die Noticen des Feuerwerkers Christopher Magalan, Berlin 1966
- Bei Lebzeiten zu singen, Berlin 1967
- Die Dummheit liefert uns ans Messer, Berlin 1967 (zusammen mit Volker von Törne)
- Der glückliche Magier, Baden-Baden 1967
- Der Wind, der dich weckt, der Wind im Garten, Neuwied [u.a.] 1967
- In der Tinte, Berlin 1968
- Amüsierpapiere oder Bilder aus Phantasus' Bauchladen, Munich 1969
- Die Balladen des Thomas Balkan, Berlin 1969
- Bilderbotschaften, Munich 1969
- Gedichte aus Biafra, Berlin [u.a.] 1969
- Jasnados Nachtlied, Freiburg im Breisgau 1969
- Eine Seite aus dem Paradiesbuch, Berlin 1969
- You're welcome, Berlin 1969
- Kraut und Gehilfe, Berlin-Friedenau 1970
- Zettelphilipp, Berlin 1970
- Die Geschichte der Geschichten, Munich 1971
- Werkauswahl, Munich 1971
- Lieder aus dem Dreckloch, Stierstadt (im Taunus) 1972
- Verschiedene Tätigkeiten, Stuttgart 1972
- Bockshorn, Munich 1973
- Kranich, Düsseldorf 1973
- Wen es angeht, Düsseldorf 1974
- Wer viel fragt, kriegt viel gesagt, Munich 1974 (together with Alfons Schweiggert)
- Flaschenpost für eine Sintflut, Berlin 1975
- Die Gestalt am Ende des Grundstücks, Düsseldorf 1975
- Nachtessen, Berlin 1975
- Der Strom, Leverkusen 1976
- Liebesgedichte, Berlin 1977
- Erinnerung an Johannes Bobrowski, Düsseldorf 1978
- Licht, Munich 1978
- Über das Fragmentarische, Mainz 1978
- Ausgewählte Gedichte, Königstein im Taunus 1979
- Hab aufgelesen meine Spuren, Berlin 1979
- Säure, Düsseldorf 1979
- Das Dings da, Düsseldorf 1980
- Die Sachen der Liebe, Berlin [u.a.] 1980
- Suchbild: über meinen Vater, Düsseldorf 1980
- Tunifers Erinnerungen und andere Erzählungen, Frankfurt 1980
- Das bucklicht Männlein, Frankfurt 1981
- Jedes Wort hat die Chance einen Anfang zu machen, Munich 1981
- Nachricht für Baratynski, Munich [u.a.] 1981
- Anabasis, Munich [u.a.] 1982
- Der wahre Muftoni, Munich [u.a.] 1982
- Ein roter Faden, Munich [u.a.] 1983
- Sein Herz ist sein Rücken, Karlsruhe 1983
- Zeichnungen und Bilder, Berlin 1983
- Jahreszeiten, Berlin 1984
- Souterrain, Munich [u.a.] 1984
- Bericht zur Entstehung einer Weltkomödie, Munich [u.a.] 1985
- Plunder, Munich [u.a.] 1986
- Sieben Blätter für Monsieur Bernstein, Stuttgart 1986
- Anzahlung auf ein Glas Wasser, Munich [u.a.] 1987
- Berliner Doodles, Berlin 1987
- Das Buch Jubal, Düsseldorf 1987
- Christoph Meckel, Remagen-Rolandseck 1987
- Limbo, Mainz 1987
- Hundert Gedichte, Munich [u.a.] 1988
- Die Kirschbäume, Warmbronn 1988
- Pferdefuß, Ravensburg 1988
- Das Buch Shiralee, Düsseldorf 1989
- Von den Luftgeschäften der Poesie, Frankfurt 1989
- Weltwundertüte voll Stückwerk, Lichtenfels 1989
- Vakuum, Warmbronn 1990
- Container, Berlin 1991
- Hans im Glück, Cologne 1991
- Jemel, Leipzig 1991
- Die Messingstadt, Munich [u.a.] 1991
- Shalamuns Papiere, Munich [u.a.] 1992
- Votiv, Warmbronn 1992
- Schlammfang, Düsseldorf 1993
- Stein, Frauenfeld 1993
- Archipel, Düsseldorf 1994
- Sidus scalae, Warmbronn 1995
- Gesang vom unterbrochenen Satz, Munich [u.a.] 1995
- Eine Hängematte voll Schnee, Berlin 1995
- Immer wieder träume ich Bücher, Warmbronn 1995
- Nachtmantel, Düsseldorf 1996
- Merkmalminiaturen, Stuttgart 1997
- Trümmer des Schmetterlings, Ostfildern vor Stuttgart 1997
- Ein unbekannter Mensch, Munich [u.a.] 1997
- Dichter und andere Gesellen, Munich [u.a.] 1998
- Jul Miller, Gifkendorf 1998
- Komm in das Haus, Munich [u.a.] 1998
- Fontany im Sande, Warmbronn 1999
- Die Ruine des Präsidentenpalastes, Düsseldorf 2000
- Schöllkopf, Warmbronn 2000
- Zähne, Munich [u.a.] 2000
- Blut im Schuh, Lüneburg 2001
- Nacht bleibt draußen und trinkt Regen, Passau 2002
- Suchbild: meine Mutter, Munich [u.a.] 2002
- Ungefähr ohne Tod im Schatten der Bäume, Munich [u.a.] 2003

== Exhibition catalogues ==
- Christoph Meckel, Radierungen, Holzschnitte, Zeichnungen, Graphik-Zyklen, Bücher, Munich 1965
- Christoph Meckel, Handzeichnungen, Radierungen, Bücher, Munich 1971
- The graphic work of Christoph Meckel, Austin, Texas 1973
- Christoph Meckel, Bilder, Graphik, Hamburg 1976
- Christoph Meckel & Christopher Middleton, Bilderbücher 1968/1978, Berlin 1979
- Christoph Meckel, Zeichnungen, Radierungen, Reutlingen 1984
- Christoph Meckel, Bilder, Bücher, Bilderbücher, Bamberg 1986
- Christoph Meckel, Zeichnungen, Bilder, Radierungen, Freiburg im Breisgau 1987
- Christoph Meckel, Zeichnungen und Graphik, Bergisch Gladbach 1987
- Christoph Meckel, Frankfurt, 1988
- Christoph Meckel, Radierungen, Freiburg im Breisgau 1990
- Christoph Meckel, Manuskriptbilder 1962 - 1992, Freiburg im Breisgau 1992
- Christoph Meckel, Neue Zeichnungen und Grafik, Saarbrücken 1997
- Christoph Meckel, Beginn eines Sommers, Troisdorf 2001

== Publications ==
- Alles andere steht geschrieben, Kiel 1993
- Georg Heym: Gedichte, Frankfurt 1968
- Vier Tage im Mai, Waldkirch 1989
- Der Vogel fährt empor als kleiner Rauch, Göttingen 1995
- Das zahnlos geschlagene Wort, Düsseldorf 1980

== Translations ==
- Avraham Ben-Yitzhak: Es entfernten sich die Dinge, Munich [u.a.] 1994
- Asher Reich: Arbeiten auf Papier, Reinbek 1992
- Tuvia Rübner: Wüstenginster, Munich [u.a.] 1990

== Illustrated works ==
- Allgemeine Erklärung der Menschenrechte, Frankfurt 1974
- Erich Arendt: Reise in die Provence, Darmstadt 1983
- Walter Aue: Worte, Cologne 1963
- Thomas Böhme: Die Zöglinge des Herrn Glasenapp, Düsseldorf 1996
- Bertolt Brecht: Bertolt Brechts Hauspostille, Frankfurt 1966
- Wolfgang Dick: Nachtstücke - versetzbar, Stierstadt im Taunus 1965
- Uwe-Michael Gutzschhahn: Fahrradklingel, Berlin 1979
- Gerd Henniger: Träume, Warmbronn 1987
- Christopher Middleton: Wie wir Großmutter zum Markt bringen, Stierstadt i. Ts. 1970
- Zvonko Plepelic: Du kommen um sieben, Berlin 1980
- Poetische Grabschriften, Frankfurt 1987
- Die Rechte des Kindes, Ravensburg 1994
- Ruth Reichstein: Lichterloh, Frauenfeld 1988
- Christa Reinig: Die Ballade vom blutigen Bomme, Düsseldorf 1972
- Voltaire: Candide oder der Optimismus; Zadig oder das Schicksal; Der weiße Stier, Cologne 1964
