= Dörte Hansen =

German writer (born 1964)

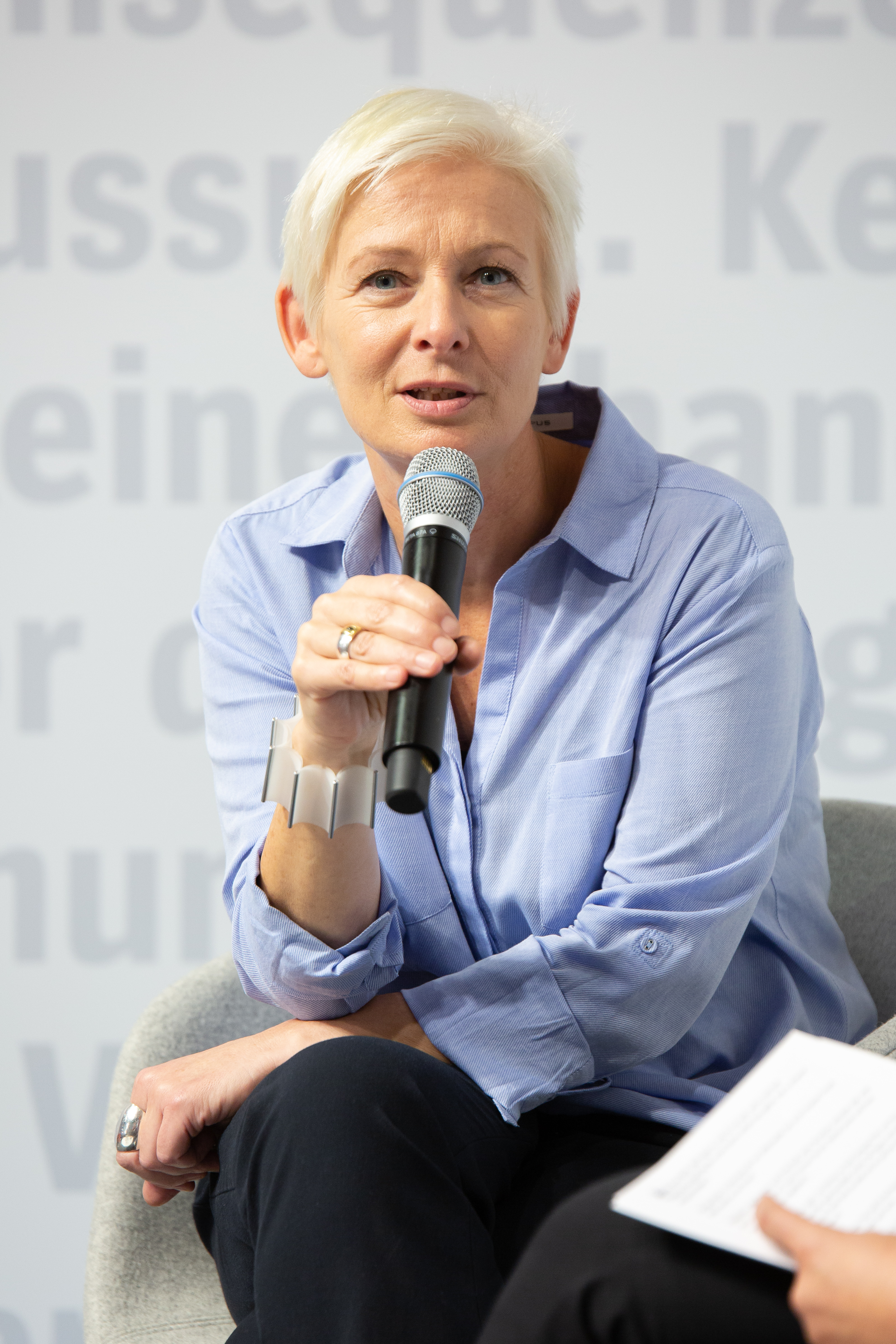
- Hansen at the Frankfurt Book Fair 2018
- Born: 1964 (age 61–62) Husum, West Germany
- Occupation: Writer, journalist
- Language: Low German; German
- Notable awards: Grimmelshausen-Preis (2019); Rheingau Literatur Preis (2019); Mainzer Stadtschreiber (2022)

Dörte Hansen (also known as Dörte Hansen-Jaax, born 1964 in Husum, West Germany) is a German linguist, journalist and writer.

== Life ==
Hansen grew up in Högel in Nordfriesland; her family spoke Low German at home. She learned her "first foreign language," Standard German, in elementary school.

After graduating high school (Abitur) in 1984, she studied sociolinguistics, English studies, Romance studies and Frisian studies at the Christian Albrechts University Kiel. In 1994, Hansen received her doctorate at the University of Hamburg with a sociolinguistic thesis on a special form of bilingualism.

Hansen is married to documentary filmmaker Sven Jaax and has a daughter. From 2005 to 2016, she lived with her family in Steinkirchen, Lower Saxony and now lives in Husum.

== Work ==
After an internship at the magazine Merian she worked until 2008 as a journalist for several radio stations (NDR, WDR, SWR, hr, DLF) and various magazines, until 2012 then as a permanent cultural editor at NDR Info. Since then, she has worked as a freelance author.

In her first novel, Altes Land (2015), Hansen worked critically on the subject of homeland: many city dwellers discovered the countryside as a place of longing for themselves and moved to a village. In Hansen's opinion, however, they were subject to a mistake because they only played country life and made "peasant theater". Hansen connects this topic with the fate of the female protagonist as a homeless postwar refugee from East Prussia in the Altes Land. The book was a bestseller and received praise from most critics.

Her second novel Mittagsstunde (2018) explores German village life. The cultural and interpersonal change in the fictional North Frisian village "Brinkebüll" is portrayed from the 1960s to the present day. The author tells the story without idealizing country life and draws in laconic language often bizarre characters with a lot of empathy.

== Memberships ==
- PEN Centre Germany

== Awards ==
- 2006: Media Prize of the foundation "Children's Rights in the One World" in the radio category for her NDR reportage Der Hamburger Kompass – Hilfe für Kinder alkoholkranker Eltern.
- 2015: Lieblingsbuch des Jahres des unabhängigen Buchhandels for Altes Land.
- 2016: Usedomer Literaturpreis for Altes Land
- 2019: Rheingau Literatur Preis for Mittagsstunde
- 2019: Niederdeutscher Literaturpreis der Stadt Kappeln
- 2019: Grimmelshausen Literaturpreis for Mittagsstunde
- 2022: Mainzer Stadtschreiber
- 2022: Kunstpreis des Landes Schleswig-Holstein

== Publications ==
- Århammar, Nils; Tadsen, Christina; Wilts, Ommo (1993). Skriiw fresk; Schriw frasch; Skriiv friisk : teksten tu a fresk literatüürweedstridj 1989/90 (in Western Frisian). Bräist/Bredstedt, NF: Nordfriisk Instituut. ISBN 3-88007-205-1. OCLC 28586962.
- Hansen-Jaax, Dörte (1995). Transfer bei Diglossie : synchrone Sprachkontaktphänomene im Niederdeutschen (in German). Hamburg: Kovač. ISBN 3-86064-292-8. OCLC 36252582.
- Fürchte dich nicht vor dem Familienberater. Reportage. In: Chrismon, December 2009.
- Hansen, Dörte (2015). Altes Land Roman. München. ISBN 978-3-8135-0647-1. OCLC 897545345. (Der Spiegel Bestseller list number 1)
- Hansen, Dörte (2018). Mittagsstunde Roman (in German). München. ISBN 978-3-328-60003-9. OCLC 1034623603. (Der Spiegel Bestseller list number 1)
- Hansen, Dörte; Greibich, Bernd; Rauda (2019). Chronik der Gemeinde Rauda 1219–2019 (in German). Rauda: Gemeinde Rauda. OCLC 1162615623.
- Hansen, Dörte (2022). Zur See : Roman (in German). München. ISBN 978-3-328-60222-4. OCLC 1309075300. (Der Spiegel Bestseller list number 2)

=== Translations ===
- Hansen, Dörte; Stokes, Anne Marie (2016). This house is mine. New York. ISBN 978-1-250-10085-6. OCLC 952567164.
- Hansen, Dörte; Hanišová, Viktorie (2016). Starý kraj [Altes Land] (in Czech). Brno. ISBN 978-80-7491-588-8. OCLC 950621108.
- Hansen, Dörte; Hanišová, Viktorie (2019). Polední hodina [Mittagsstunde] (in Czech). Brno. ISBN 978-80-7491-283-2. OCLC 1130266843.
- Hansen, Dörte; Pruijs, Lucienne (2016). Het oude land [Altes Land] (in Dutch). [Amsterdam]. ISBN 978-94-027-1330-5. OCLC 955350043.

=== Audio books ===
- Hoger, Hannelore; Stockmann, Wolfgang (2015), Altes Land (audio book) (in German), Munich, ISBN 978-3-8371-3089-8, OCLC 950477703
- Hoger, Hannelore (2018), Mittagsstunde (audio book) (in German), Munich, ISBN 978-3-8371-4278-5, OCLC 1073860798
- Hoss, Nina (2022), Zur See (audio book) (in German), Munich, ISBN 978-3-8371-6068-0, OCLC 1344386020

=== Film versions ===
- 2020: Altes Land, director: Sherry Hormann
- 2022: Mittagsstunde, director: Lars Jessen
