= Ricarda Junge =

German writer (born 1979)

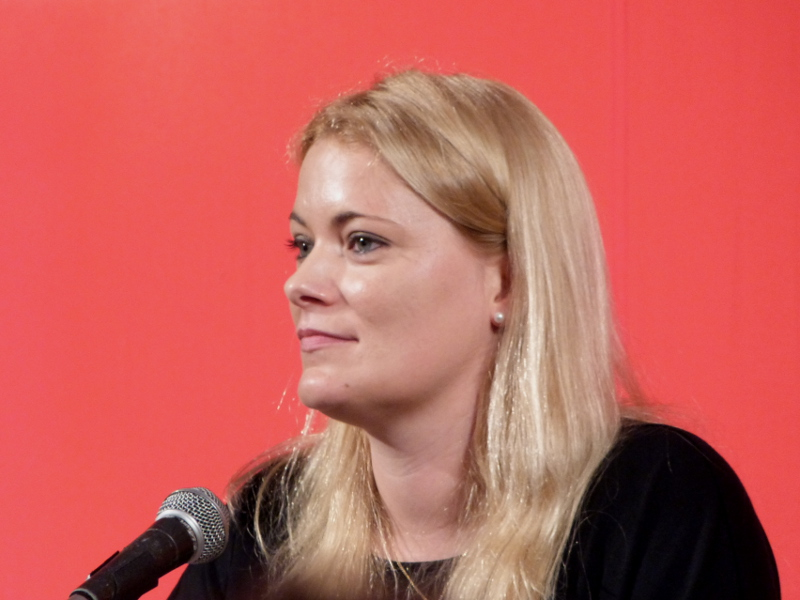
Image of Ricarda Junge

Ricarda Junge (born 1979 in Wiesbaden) is a German writer.

== Life ==
Ricarda Junge was born in Wiesbaden in 1979. After a longer stay in the US, she first studied law and then at the Deutsches Literaturinstitut Leipzig. After graduating, she studied Protestant theology in Frankfurt am Main. For her debut Silberfaden she was awarded the Grimmelshausen-Förderpreis in 2003. Her novel Kein fremdes Land was published in 2005. This was followed by the novels Eine schöne Geschichte (2008) and Die komische Frau (2010). Her latest novel The Last Warm Days was published in August 2014. For her work, she received the Deutscher Literaturfonds e. V. working grant and was a fellow of the Literarisches Colloquium Berlin and the Künstlerdorf Schöppingen. Since 2018 she has worked as a teacher in Berlin. There she taught German, mathematics, general studies and social studies and regularly took on special educational tasks. In 2020, she completed a Master of Education for elementary school teaching at Humboldt-Universität zu Berlin. She wrote her master's thesis as a joint research project with the teacher Karina Fuchs in the Department of Mathematics on the linguistic potential of arithmetic stories. After her teacher traineeship at an elementary school in Pankow, she successfully passed the second state examination in summer 2021 and was taken on as a teacher in Berlin. In spring 2022, she resigned from her permanent position. She then moved to Kassel with her family. She has been working there as an author and teacher since May 2022. Ricarda Junge has two daughters.

Ricarda Junge is a co-founder of PEN Berlin.

== Works ==
- Die letzten warmen Tage. Novel. Frankfurt am Main: S. Fischer, 2014 ISBN 978-3-10-002218-9.
- Die komische Frau. Novel. Frankfurt am Main: S. Fischer, 2010 ISBN 978-3-10-039329-6
- Eine schöne Geschichte. Novel. Frankfurt/M.: S. Fischer, 2008. ISBN 978-3-10-039328-9
- Kein fremdes Land. Novel. Frankfurt am Main: S. Fischer, 2005. ISBN 3-10-039325-2
- Silberfaden. Stories. Frankfurt am Main: S. Fischer, 2002. ISBN 3-596-15476-6

== Publications ==
- Zorn – Spielarten eines großen Gefühls. Texts from Homer to Thomas Mann. Edited by Ricarda Junge, S. Fischer, Frankfurt a. M., 2014
- Zwischen Kassel und Kurpark. In: Durchgefressen und Durchgehauen. Edited by Joachim Helfer and Klaus Wettig, Steidl Verlag, Göttingen 2013
- Drei Grafen. In: Ein extraherrlicher Meersommerabend. Edited by Jan Christophersen, mareverlag, Hamburg 2013
- Stalinhusen. Ricarda Junge, Thoren & Lindskog, Malmö 2011
- Inselträume. In: News from the homeland. Edited by Petra Gropp, Jürgen Hosemann, Oliver Vogel, Günther Opitz. S. Fischer, Frankfurt 2004
- Barenberg. In: 20 under 30. Young German authors. Edited by Martin Brinkmann and Werner Löcher-Lawrence, DVA, Stuttgart/Munich 2002
- Interview: Mit Fragen beginnen. In: Bella triste Nr. 14, Hildesheim 2006

== Awards ==
- 1999: Förderpreis des Jungen Literaturforum Hessen-Thüringen
- 2003: Förderpreis des Grimmelshausen-Preises für Silberfaden
- 2004: George-Konell-Preis of the state capital Wiesbaden
- 2005: Residency scholarship at the Literarisches Colloquium Berlin
- 2006: Scholarship of the German Literature Fund
- 2008: Working scholarship of the Stiftung Preußische Seehandlung Berlin
- 2010: Stipendium Künstlerdorf Schöppingen
- 2011: Stipendium Chateau d'Orion, France
- 2013: Robert-Gernhardt-Preis with Paulus Böhmer
