= Caroline Wahl =

German novelist (born 1995)

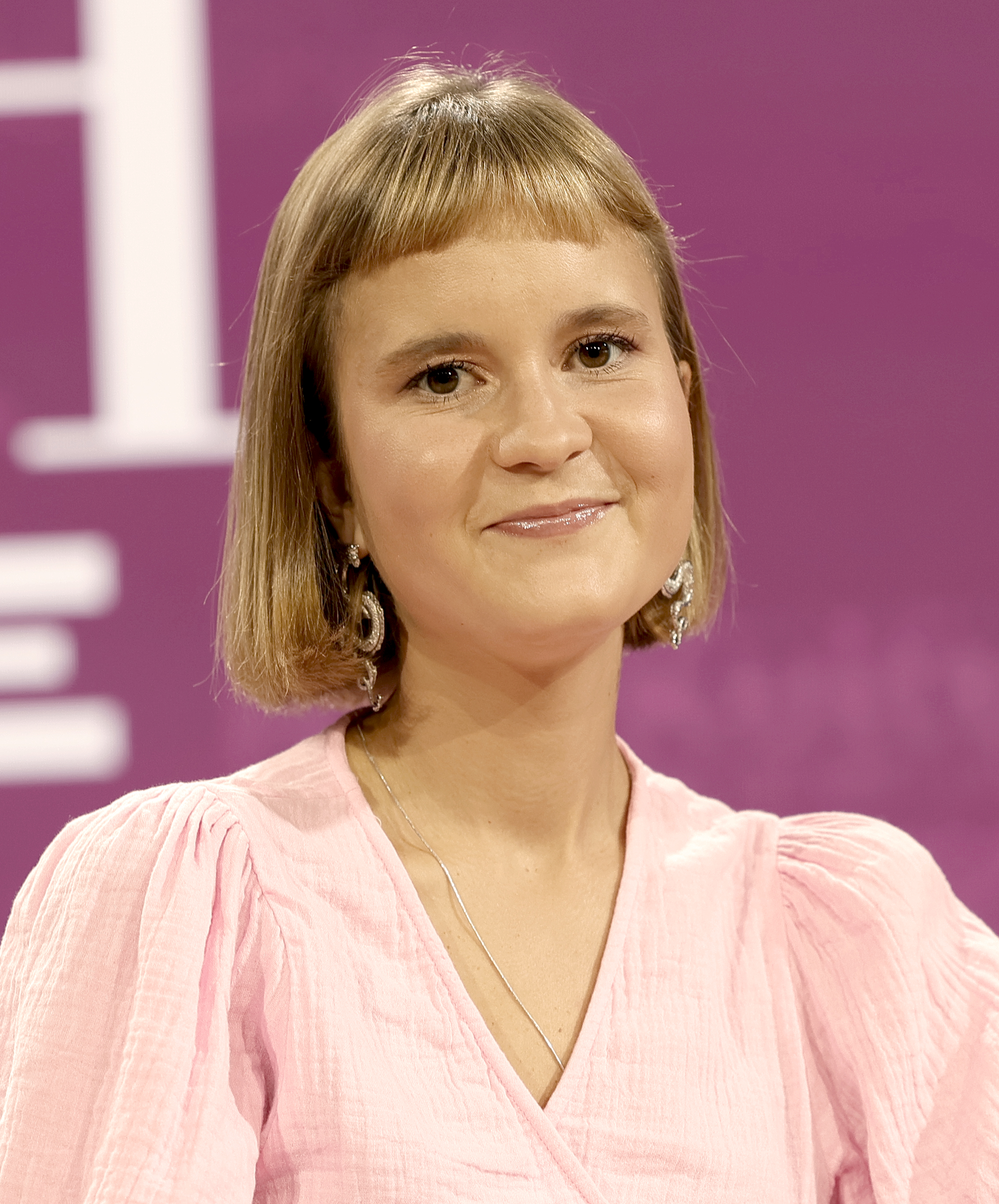
Wahl at the Frankfurt Book Fair in 2024

Caroline Wahl (born 1995 in Mainz) is a German author. She has written four novels. Her debut novel, 22 Bahnen, was published in April 2023 by DuMont Buchverlag. Written from a first-person perspective, it explores the life of Tilda, a student struggling to study mathematics while also caring for her 11-year-old half-sister.

== Biography ==
Caroline Wahl grew up with three siblings near Heidelberg and Stuttgart. After completing her schooling, she studied German studies and German literature in Tübingen and Berlin. Subsequently, she worked as a publishing assistant at Diogenes Verlag in Zürich. During this time, Wahl wrote her first novel, 22 Bahnen, in just three months. Her love of the sea led her to Northern Germany in 2022, where she worked for a communications agency in Rostock. Since the success of her debut novel, she has lived as an independent author in the Hanseatic city.

== Literary works ==
Her debut novel, 22 Bahnen, was published in April 2023 by the Cologne-based DuMont Buchverlag after interest from a total of seven publishers. The author describes the everyday and family life of the student Tilda from a first-person perspective. Amidst this, she cannot focus entirely on her demanding mathematics studies. Due to her mother’s alcoholism and their father’s departure, she also has to look after her 11-year-old half-sister, Ida.

Reviewers of the novel, such as Elke Heidenreich, Christine Westermann, and Denis Scheck, affirm that the author has developed a poignant writing style, in which the fate of both sisters is authentically conveyed to the reader, without addressing the reasons for the mother’s alcoholism. The writer herself has no personal experience with addiction problems within her family but has spoken with professionals who work in addiction wards to portray the subject realistically.

Wahl has always wanted to write a novel about a strong, self-willed, yet sensible young woman. Novels such as Alina Bronsky's Scherbenpark, Angelika Klüssendorf's Das Mädchen, and Juli Zeh’s Spieltrieb served as role models for her. The novel’s style and subject especially appeal to young readers, and 22 Bahnen was discussed on the social network BookTok soon after its publication. In May 2023, the German radio and television broadcasting corporation Norddeutscher Rundfunk selected the novel as its Book of the Month. The novel reached the top 20 on Spiegel's bestseller list for the calendar year 2023 and has sold more than 100,000 copies in the same year.

In its year of publication, the story received the book prize from Stiftung Ravensburger Verlag, as well as the German literature prizes Ulla-Hahn-Autorenpreis and Grimmelshausen-Förderpreis. It was also selected as the favorite novel of independent bookstores.

The author's second novel, Windstärke 17, is set on the island of Rügen and explores the future life of Ida, a character introduced in the first novel. Her third novel is Die Assistentin ("The Assistant") and the fourth 1999 Meter über dem Meer (1999 Meters Above Sea) is set in St Moritz where a young woman assumes a false identity to become part of high society.

=== List of works ===
- 22 Bahnen, novel. DuMont-Buchverlag, Köln 2023, ISBN 978-3-8321-6045-6.
- Windstärke 17, novel. DuMont-Buchverlag, Köln 2024, ISBN 978-3-8321-6841-4.
- Die Assistentin, novel. Rowohlt, 2025, ISBN 978-3-498-00770-6
- 1999 Meter über dem Meer, novel. Rowohlt, 2026 ISBN 978-3498007713
