= Silke Scheuermann =

German poet and novelist

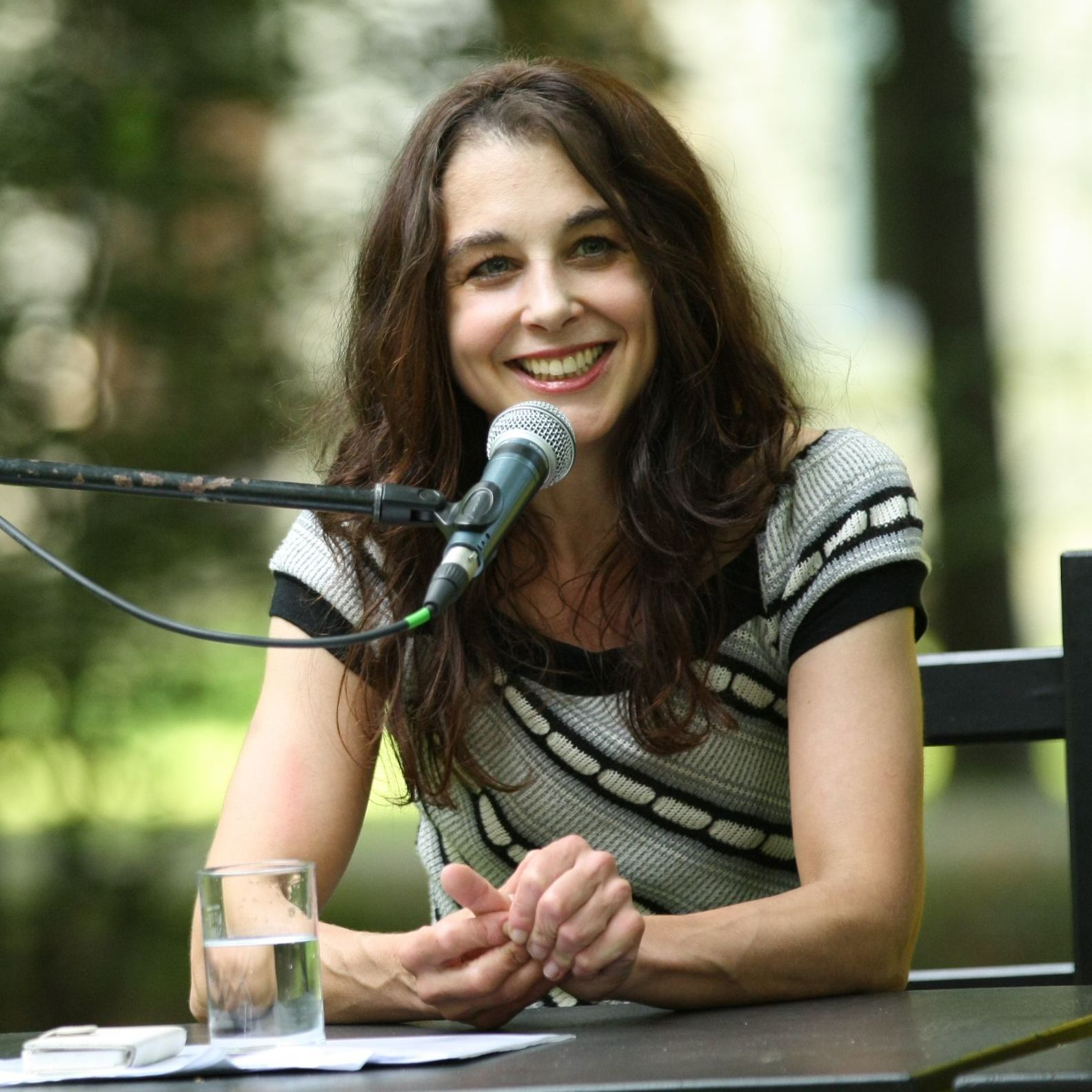
- Silke Scheuermann reading at the Erlanger Poetenfest 2014
- Born: 15 June 1973 (age 53); Karlsruhe
- Occupations: Author, Poet
- Writing career
- Genres: Fiction, Poetry
- Notable works: The Hour Between Dog and Wolf (novel)

Silke Scheuermann (born 15 June 1973 in Karlsruhe) is a German poet and novelist. She was educated in Frankfurt, Leipzig, and Paris. She is best known for her debut novel Die Stunde zwischen Hund und Wolf (The Hour Between Dog and Wolf), which has been translated into ten languages including English. She has won numerous German and European literary prizes and fellowships, including the Georg-Christoph-Lichtenberg-Preis, the Leonce-und-Lena-Preis, the Hölty Prize, the Bertolt-Brecht-Literaturpreis, and a Villa Massimo fellowship.

== Works ==
- Scheuermann, Silke (2016). Wovon wir lebten : Roman (in German). Frankfurt am Main. ISBN 978-3-89561-378-4. OCLC 958394594.
- —— (2015). Und ich fragte den Vogel : lyrische Momente (in German). Frankfurt am Main: Schöffling & Co. ISBN 978-3-89561-377-7. OCLC 923731647.
- —— (2014). Skizze vom Gras Gedichte (in German). Frankfurt, M. ISBN 978-3-89561-376-0. OCLC 879876499.
- —— (2014). Die Häuser der anderen Roman (in German). Frankfurt, M. ISBN 978-3-596-03089-7. OCLC 880387387.
- —— (2011). Shanghai Performance Roman. Frankfurt, M. ISBN 978-3-89561-373-9. OCLC 706969509.
- ——; Harvey, Franziska (2012). Emma James und die Zukunft der Schmetterlinge (in German). Frankfurt, M. ISBN 978-3-596-80954-7. OCLC 813413592.
- —— (2007). Die Stunde zwischen Hund und Wolf : Roman (in German). Frankfurt am Main: Schöffling. ISBN 978-3-89561-371-5. OCLC 79447617.
- —— (2005). Reiche Mädchen : Erzählungen (in German). Frankfurt am Main: Schöffling. ISBN 3-89561-370-3. OCLC 57730196.
- —— (2004). Der zärtlichste Punkt im All : Gedichte (in German). Frankfurt am Main: Suhrkamp. ISBN 3-518-41593-X. OCLC 54778074.
- —— (2001). Der Tag an dem die Möwen zweistimmig sangen : Gedichte (in German). Frankfurt am Main: Suhrkamp. ISBN 3-518-12239-8. OCLC 48112041.

=== English translations ===
- Scheuermann, Silke; Jones, Lucy Renner (2018). The hour between dog and wolf. London. ISBN 978-0-85742-473-0. OCLC 1026486618.

== Awards ==
- 2001 Leonce-und-Lena-Preis, Darmstadt
- 2003 Literaturstipendium Lana
- 2003 Stipendium Künstlerdorf Schöppingen
- 2004 Stadtschreiberin in Beirut
- 2004 Advancement award at the Merano Poetry Prize
- 2004 Literaturstipendium Villa Aurora, Los Angeles
- 2004 Stipendium der Kunststiftung Baden-Württemberg
- 2005 Dresdner Stadtschreiberin
- 2005 Förderpreis zum Hermann-Hesse-Preis
- 2006 Studienaufenthalt in der Casa Baldi in Olevano Romano bei Rom
- 2006 Stipendium Künstlerdorf Schreyahn
- 2006 New York-Stipendium Deutscher Literaturfonds
- 2007 Förderpreis zum Grimmelshausen-Preis
- 2008 George-Konell-Preis
- 2009 Stipendium Villa Massimo
- 2009 Förderpreis zum Droste-Preis
- 2012 Stipendium Goethe-Institut Villa Kamogawa, Kyoto
- 2012 Poetikdozentur: junge Autoren der Hochschule RheinMain, WS 2012/13
- 2013/2014 Stipendium des Internationalen Künstlerhauses Villa Concordia in Bamberg
- 2014 Hölty-Preis
- 2014 Stipendium im Rahmen des Hausacher Leselenz
- 2016 Bertolt-Brecht-Literaturpreis
- 2016 Robert-Gernhardt-Preis für das Lyrikprojekt Zweites Buch der Unruhe
- 2017 Georg-Christoph-Lichtenberg-Preis, für ihr literarisches Gesamtwerk unter besonderer Berücksichtigung ihres Romans Wovon wir lebten
- 2019 Goethe Plaque of the City of Frankfurt
