= Kelly Junge Jr. =

Kellogg Junge Jr.
- Born: March 13, 1950 (age 76)
- Occupation: Child actor
- Years active: 1958

Kelly Junge Jr. (born March 13, 1950) is an American former child actor.

== Career ==
He is best remembered for his role as Timmy Martin's friend, Scott Richards, in the long- running television series, Lassie. Junge appeared in thirteen episodes during the troubled last half of the fourth season (1957–1958). The character was created to give Timmy a companion his own age, but "Scott" was canceled at the end of the season.

Junge played Tommy Reed in the 1958 Perry Mason episode "The Case of the Deadly Double.
