= George-Konell-Preis =

Literary prize of Hesse

George-Konell-Preis was a literary prize of Hesse.

== Winners ==
- 1998: Gudrun Pausewang
- 2000: Stephan Kaluza
- 2002: Katja Behrens
- 2004: Ricarda Junge
- 2006: Peter Kurzeck
- 2008: Silke Scheuermann
- 2010: Michael Schneider
- 2012: Alissa Walser
- 2014: Stephan Thome
- 2016: Saskia Hennig von Lange
- 2018: Eva Demski
