= Schubart-Literaturpreis =

German literacy prize

Christian Friedrich Daniel Schubart

The Schubart-Literaturpreis is a Germany literary prize donated by the city of Aalen since 1956 in honor of the 18th-century poet Christian Friedrich Daniel Schubart. It is one of the oldest literary awards of Baden-Württemberg.

The main prize, which is 15,000 euros as of 2015 (As of 2025: €20,000), is presented every two years on Schubart's birthday to German-language writers whose literary or journalistic achievement "is in the tradition of the liberal and enlightened thought of Daniel Schubart." A runner-up prize (called Förderpreis) of 5,000 euros (As of 2021: €7,000) has also been presented since 2011.

== Past winners ==
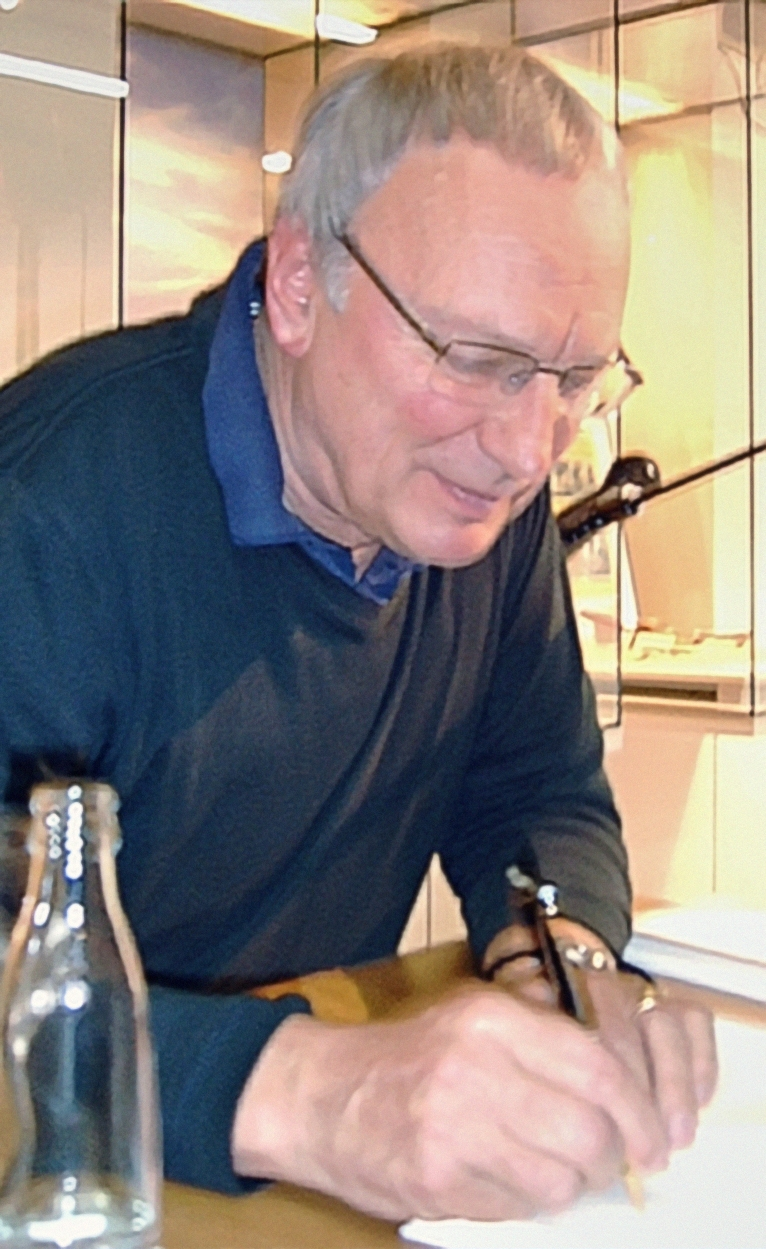
Uwe Timm who won the 2003 Schubart-Literaturpreis for his novel Rot

- 1956: Hugo Theurer, Eduard Thom
- 1958: no award
- 1960: Paul Wanner, Ernst Häußinger, Bernhard Hildebrand
- 1962: no award
- 1964: Heinz Rainer Reinhardt, Konrad Winkler, Wilhelm Koch, Kurt Hermann Seidel
- 1966: no award
- 1968: Michael Mann, Hartmann Ulmschneider
- 1970: no award
- 1972: Peter Lahnstein, Josef W. Janker
- 1974: Peter Härtling, Ernst R. Hauschka, Rolf Hellmut Foerster
- 1976: Dieter Narr, Margarete Hannsmann
- 1978: Richard Schmid, Horst Brandstätter, Georg Holzwarth
- 1980: Reinhard Siegert, Werner Dürrson, Roland Lang
- 1982: Otto Borst, Hartmut Müller, Peter Spranger
- 1984: Gerhard Storz, Walther Dürr, Dieter Wieland
- 1986: Kurt Honolka, Hartmut Geerken
- 1989: Eveline Hasler, Dieter Schlesak, Jürgen Walter
- 1991: Hermann Glaser, Karlheinz Bauer, Helmut Pfisterer
- 1993: Thomas Rosenlöcher, Henrike Leonhardt, Axel Kuhn
- 1995: Ralph Giordano, Hermann Baumhauer
- 1997: Alice Schwarzer
- 1999: Gabriele Goettle, Hellmut G. Haasis
- 2001: Robert Gernhardt, Hartmut Schick
- 2003: Uwe Timm
- 2005: Henryk M. Broder
- 2007: Friedrich Christian Delius
- 2009: Peter Schneider
- 2011: Hans Christoph Buch, Förderpreis: Timo Brunke, Sonderpreis: Bernd Jürgen Warneken
- 2013: Jenny Erpenbeck, Förderpreis: Patricia Görg
- 2015: Katja Petrowskaja, Förderpreis: Karen Köhler
- 2017: Saša Stanišić, Förderpreis: Isabelle Lehn
- 2019: Daniel Kehlmann for Tyll, Förderpreis: Nora Krug for Heimat: Ein deutsches Familienalbum
- 2021: Monika Helfer for Die Bagage, Förderpreis: Verena Güntner for Power
- 2023: Julia Schoch for Das Vorkommnis, Förderpreis: Slata Roschal for 153 Formen des Nichtseins
- 2025: Christoph Peters for Innerstädtischer Tod, Förderpreis: Grit Krüger for Tunnel
