= Ulrike Draesner =

German author

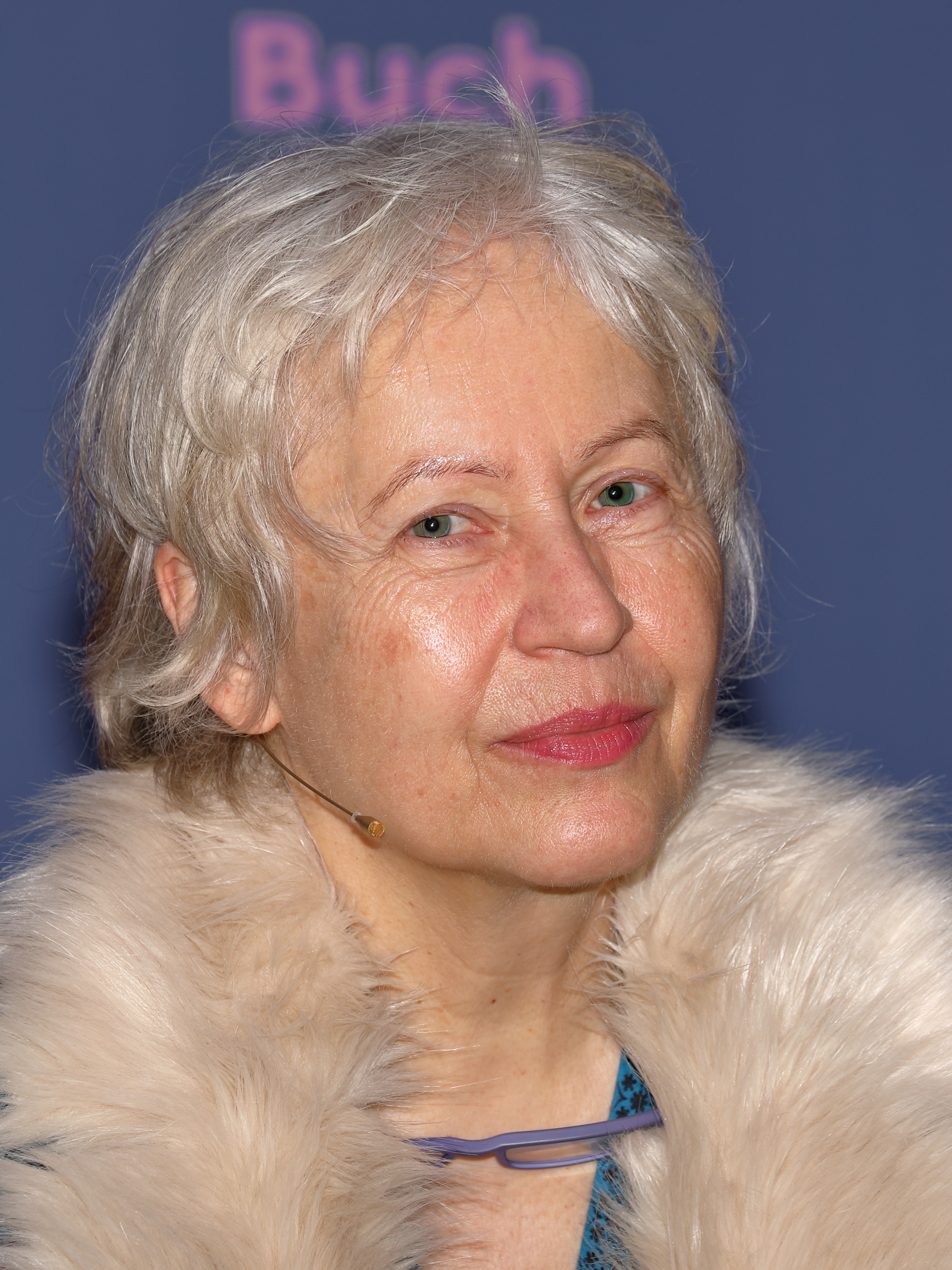
- Draesner in 2025
- Born: 20 January 1962 (age 64)

Ulrike Draesner (born 20 January 1962 in Munich) is a German author. She was awarded the 2016 Nicolas Born Prize.

== Life and work ==
The daughter of an architect, Draesner grew up in Munich, Germany. She received a Bavarian State scholarship for the best performing student at Gymnasium (Sixth Form) from the Stiftung Maximilianeum. She read Law, English and German literature as well as Philosophy in Munich, Salamanca, and Oxford. She worked as a lecturer at the Institute for German Philology from 1989 to 1993. In 1992, she received her doctorate for a dissertation on the Middle High German romance Parzival.

In 1993, Draesner quit her academic career in order to work as a full-time author. She has lived in Berlin since 1994, writing both poetry and prose. Her novel Vorliebe (2010) is a romance novel. In 2014, her groundbreaking novel Sieben Sprünge vom Rand der Welt was published and a celebrated success. Draesner frequently collaborates in cross-media projects with other artists and merges literature with sculpting, performing arts, and music. She became a member of the PEN Centre Germany in 1999. In 2010, she was elected to a Fellowship at the North Rhine-Westphalian Academy of Sciences, Humanities and the Arts. She is a regular guest at international literary festivals, and currently (2018) serves on the prize jury at the Irseer Pegasus. Her work has been translated into numerous languages.

During the academic year 2015/16, Draesner was a visiting fellow at New College, Oxford, working with Karen Leeder, leader of the Mediating Modernity project, on topics of bilingualism, poetry translation and negotiating identity as a Writer in residence at the Faculty for Medieval and Modern Languages at the University of Oxford.

== Publications ==
Single author titles

- Wege durch erzählte Welten. Intertextuelle Verweise als Mittel der Bedeutungskonstitution in Wolframs Parzival, dissertation, Frankfurt am Main [u.a.] 1993.
- Gedächtnisschleifen, poetry, Frankfurt am Main 1995, revised edition Munich 2008.
- Anis-o-trop, poetry, Hamburg 1997.
- Lichtpause, novel, poetry 1998.
- Reisen unter den Augenlidern, short stories, Klagenfurt 1999.
- für die nacht geheuerte zellen, poetry, München 2001.
- Bläuliche Sphinx, Berlin 2002 (with Lothar Seruset).
- Mitgift, novel, Munich 2002.
- Hot Dogs, short stories, Munich 2004.
- kugelblitz, poetry, Munich 2005.
- Spiele, novel, Munich 2005.
- Schöne Frauen lesen, essays, Luchterhand, Munich 2007, ISBN 978-3-630-62121-0.
- berührte orte, poetry, Luchterhand, Munich 2008, ISBN 978-3-630-87268-1.
- Vorliebe, novel, Luchterhand, Munich 2010, ISBN 978-3-630-87294-0.
- Richtig liegen. Geschichten in Paaren, short stories, Luchterhand, Munich 2011, ISBN 978-3-630-87324-4.
- Heimliche Helden. Über Heinrich von Kleist, James Joyce, Thomas Mann, Gottfried Benn, Karl Valentin u.v.a., Luchterhand, Munich 2013, ISBN 978-3-630-87373-2.
- Sieben Sprünge vom Rand der Welt, novel, Luchterhand, Munich 2014, ISBN 978-3-630-87372-5.

Editor

- Verführung – Novellen von Goethe bis Musil, Munich 1994

Literary translations

- Louise Glück: Wilde Iris, Munich 2008.
- Louise Glück: Averno, Munich 2007.
- Charles Simmons: Belles Lettres, Munich 2003 (translated with Klaus Modick).
- William Shakespeare: Twin spin, Göttingen 2000.
- Gertrude Stein: The first reader, Klagenfurt 2001.

== Awards (selection) ==
- 1994 Literary Scholararship awarded by the City of Munich
- 1995 Advancement award: Leonce-und-Lena-Preis
- 1997 Foglio-Preis für Junge Literatur
- 1997 Bayerischer Staatsförderpreis für Literatur
- 2001 Award Künstlerhaus Edenkoben
- 2001 Advancement award: Friedrich-Hölderlin-Preis of the City of Bad Homburg
- 2002 Preis der Literaturhäuser
- 2006 Droste-Preis der Stadt Meersburg
- 2006 Professor of Poetry at the University of Bamberg
- 2010 Solothurner Literaturpreis
- 2012 Grenzgänger-Recherchestipendium der Robert Bosch Stiftung für Sieben Sprünge vom Rand der Welt
- 2013 Roswitha-Preis
- 2014 Joachim-Ringelnatz-Preis
- 2014 Longlist beim Deutschen Buchpreis mit Sieben Sprünge vom Rand der Welt
- 2016 Nicolas Born Prize
- 2020 Bayerischer Buchpreis – belles-lettres, for Schwitters
- 2021 Großer Preis des Deutschen Literaturfonds
- 2024 Georg Dehio Book Prize
- 2025 Christine Lavant Preis
