= Karen Köhler =

German writer, playwright and actor (born 1974)

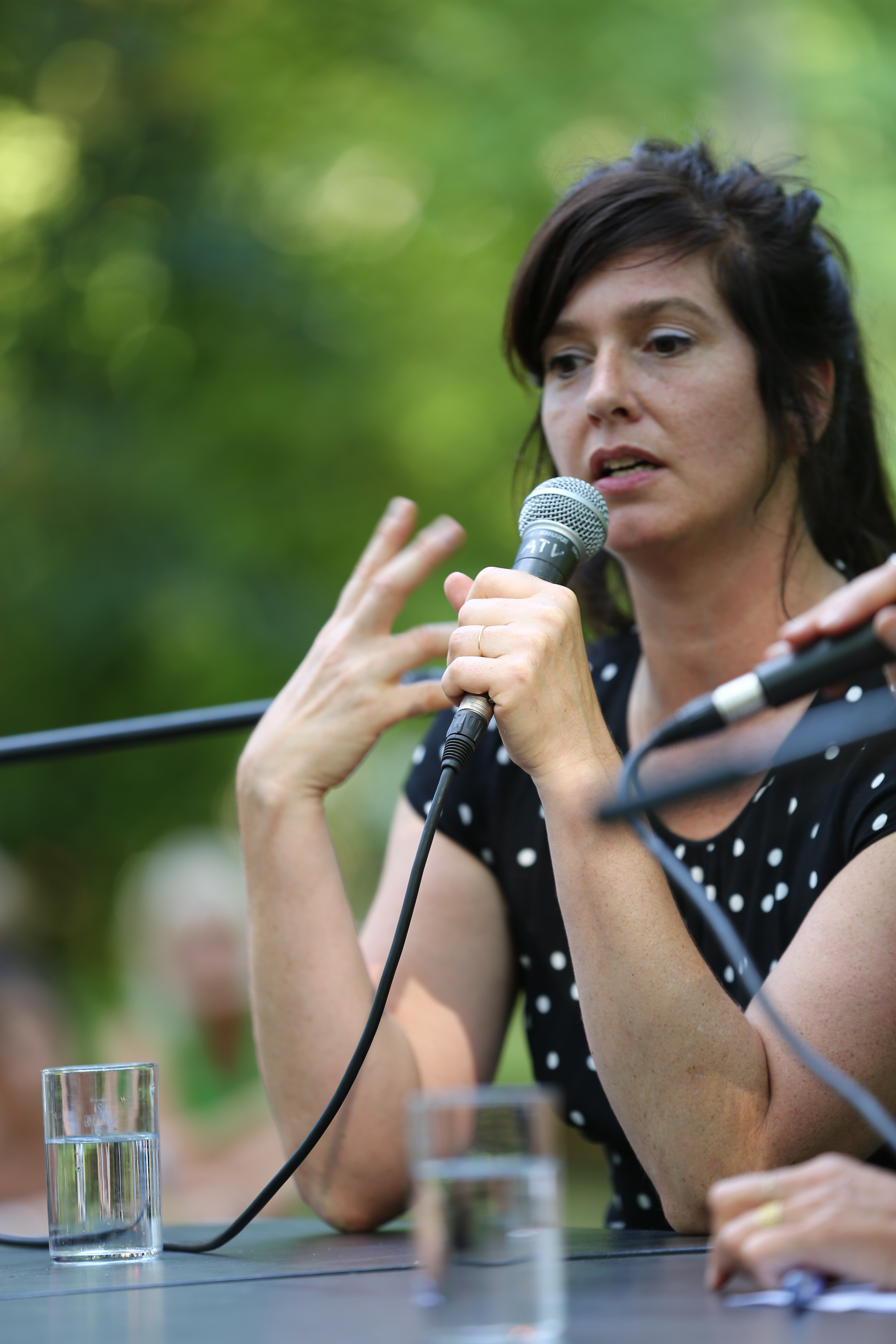
- Karen Köhler (2019)
- Born: 1974 (age 51–52) Barmbek, Hamburg, Germany
- Education: Hochschule der Künste Bern
- Notable awards: Deutscher Jugendliteraturpreis(German Youth Literature Award 2025)

Website
- Official website

Karen Köhler (born 1974 in Hamburg) is a German writer, playwright and actor. In 2025, she was awarded the Deutscher Jugendliteraturpreis (German Youth Literature Award) for her children's book Himmelwärts (Heavenwards).

== Life ==
Karen Köhler was born in the Barmbek district of Hamburg. She is the daughter of a firefighter and a care home assistant. After graduating from school, she studied acting at the Academy of Music and Theater in Bern. She worked as an actor until 2014, first in permanent positions and then as a freelancer. In 2008, she began working as an author (drama and prose) and illustrator.

In 2010 she became a member of the Hamburg Authors Forum and in 2011 she received the Hamburg Literature Prize. She was invited to give a reading at the Ingeborg Bachmann Prize ceremony in 2014 and received special attention as she was not allowed to attend the event because she had chickenpox. Out of solidarity with her, there was a spontaneous, unofficial reading of Karen Köhler's text Il Comandante at Klagenfurt Lendhafen, which was broadcast on the Internet via livestream. This text is part of her collection of stories Wir haben Raketen geangelt (We Fished for Rockets). After its publication in the summer of 2014, it reached position 36 on the bestseller list for hardcover fiction, was nominated for the Aspects Literature Prize and was translated into several languages. Subsequently, Köhler won various scholarships and artist residencies.

From 2013 to 2015, she wrote a series of plays (a hero trilogy) dealing with the topic of right-wing extremism for the DNT Weimar, which have since been performed in theatres throughout Germany.

In 2019, Köhler was nominated for the German Screenplay Award, which was awarded at the 2019 Berlin International Film Festival, for Cowboy & Indianer (Cowboys & Indians).

She has received several scholarships, including a one-year scholarship from the German Literature Fund for her debut novel Miroloi. Miroloi was published in 2019 by Carl Hanser Verlag and was on the long list for the 2019 German Book Prize.

Karen Köhler lives in Hamburg.

== Works ==
=== Prose ===
- Wir haben Raketen geangelt (We've been fishing Fireworks). Stories. Carl Hanser Verlag, Munich 2014, ISBN 978-3-446-24602-7. Translated into French, Dutch, Turkish, Albanian.
- Miroloi. Novel. Carl Hanser Verlag, Munich 2019, ISBN 978-3-446-26171-6. Translated into Italian, Greek, Chinese.
- Himmelwärts (Heavenwards). Novel for children. Carl Hanser Verlag, Munich 2024, ISBN 978-3-446-27922-3. Translated into Italian, Dutch, Russian, Chinese, Korean.
- Spielen (Play). Essay, Verlag Hanser Berlin, Berlin 2025, ISBN 978-3-446-28413-5.

=== Audio books ===
- Wir haben Raketen geangelt (We've been fishing Fireworks). Stories. Read by Sandra Hüller and Karen Köhler. Roof Music/Tacheles! Bochum 2015, ISBN 978-3-86484-279-5.
- Miroloi. Novel. Read by Karen Köhler. Roof Music/Tacheles! Bochum 2019, ISBN 978-3-86484-595-6.
- Himmelwärts (Heavenwards). Novel for children. Der Diwan Hörbuchverlag, Winterbach 2024, ISBN 978-3-949840-33-3.
- Spielen (Play). Essay, Verlag Hanser Berlin, Berlin 2025, ISBN 978-3-86484-856-8.

=== Translations ===
- Nick Drnaso, Sabrina. Graphic Novel. Translated by Karen Köhler and Daniel Beskos. Blumenbar Verlag, Berlin 2019, ISBN 978-3-351-05071-9.
- Steven Withrow, Abzählreim (Counting Rhyme) (Poem), translated by Karen Köhler. In Kenn Nesbitt: Jetzt noch ein Gedicht und dann aus das Licht! (English language version: One Minute Until Bedtime), Hanser Verlag, Munich 2019, ISBN 978-3-446-26438-0.
- Nick Drnaso, Acting Class. Graphic Novel. Übersetzt von Karen Köhler und Daniel Beskos. Blumenbar / Aufbau Verlag, Graphic Novel. Translated by Karen Köhler and Daniel Beskos. Blumenbar Verlag, Berlin 2022 ISBN 978-3-351-05102-0.

=== Theatre ===
- Pornorama. Ein Männermärchen (Pornorama. A Man Tale). Premiered in 2010.
- Wie ich unter einer Platane eine Erleuchtung hatte, warum sterben uncool ist und das Brot meiner Oma glücklich macht (How I Reached Enlightenment under a Plane Tree, Why Dying Is Uncool and Why My Grandma's Bread Makes You Happy). Premiered in 2012.
- Ramayana. Ein Heldenversuch (Ramayana. A Heroic Attempt). Premiered at the Baden State Theatre in 2013.
- Deine Helden – Meine Träume (Your Heroes – My Dreams). Premiered at DNT Weimar in 2013.
- Helden! Oder: Warum ich einen grünen Umhang trage und gegen die Beschissenheit der Welt ankämpfe (Heroes! Or: Why I Wear a Green Cape and Fight the Shittiness of the World). Premiered at the DNT Weimar in 2014.
- III Helden: Stadt. Land. Traum. (III Heroes: City. Country. Dream.) Premiered at the DNT Weimar in 2015.
- ER. SIE. ES. (HE. SHE. IT.) Premiered at the Baden State Theatre in 2016.
- Himmelwärts (Heavenwards), Premiered at the Theater Ingolstadt in 2022.
- Sieres – Fragmente einer scheinbaren Aporie Scenic reading at Berliner Ensemble 2022.

=== Publishing ===
- Akzente 3 / 2019 – Briefe an den Täter (Akzente 3 / 2019 – Letters to the Perpetrator). Magazine series by Akzente. Carl Hanser Verlag, Munich 2019, ISBN 978-3-446-26329-1.

=== Awards ===
- 2011: Hamburg Literature Prize
- 2011: Prize from the Austrian Federal Ministry for Education, Art and Culture.
- 2013: Otfried Preußler Theatre for Children Prize
- 2015: Rauris Literature Prize from the Salzburg state government
- 2015: Advancement award at the Schubart Literature Prize
- 2015: Writer in residence for the Goethe Institute in Reykjavík
- 2015: Scholar of the German Embassy in Tirana
- 2016: Scholar of the Dutch Foundation for Literature in Amsterdam
- 2017: Boarder crosser scholarship from the Robert Bosch Foundation
- 2017: Laudinella scholarship in St. Moritz from the Hamburg Ministry of Culture and Media
- 2018: Scholarship from the German Literature fund
- 2019: Work scholarship from the Goethe Institute in Marseille
- 2019: Nomination for the German Screenplay Prize for Cowboy & Indianer (Cowboys & Indians)
- 2019: Nomination for the German Book Prize for Miroloi
- 2020: Ten-week London scholarship from the German Literature Fund, as Writer-in-Residence at Queen Mary University of London (spring 2020)
- 2025: Katholischer Kinder- und Jugendbuchpreis for Himmelwärts (Köhler's first children's book)

=== Literature ===
- Theo Breuer: Zwanzig Tage – Zwanzig Romane: Ein Buchspiel (Twenty Days – Twenty Novels: A Book Game). In: Matrix. Zeitschrift für Literatur und Kunst (Magazine for Literature and Art), Edition 58., Pop Verlag, Ludwigsburg 2019, pp. 7–167.
