= Klaus Modick =

German author and literary translator (born 1951)

Klaus Modick (born 3 May 1951) is a German author and literary translator.

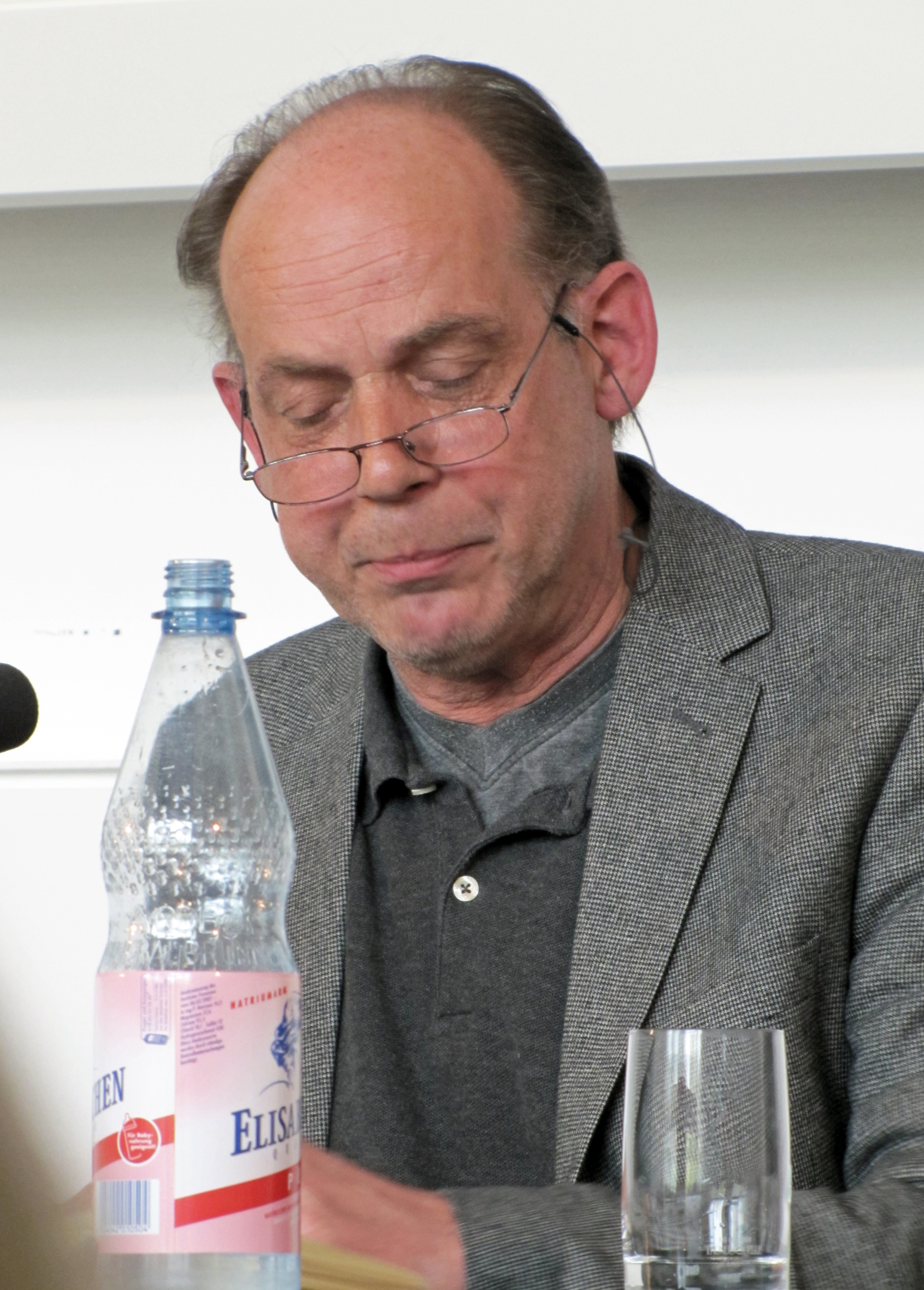
Klaus Modick in 2011

== Education and early career ==
Klaus Modick was born in Oldenburg and completed his secondary education at the Altes Gymnasium there in 1971. He then attended Hamburg University, where he read German, History and Educational Theory, completing his teaching qualification in 1977. Modick then took a doctorate in 1980, with a thesis on the German-Jewish novelist and playwright Lion Feuchtwanger.

Modick spent five years as an advertising copywriter and worked as a part-time lecturer in German literature in the higher education sector before becoming a freelance writer and translator in 1984.

In 1984 he married an American citizen he met during one of his frequent visits to Crete and they have two daughters. Modick has said that he feels a special affinity with Crete and its people and in 2003 he published the novel Der kretische Gast, set in 1943 during the German occupation of Crete.

== Established writer ==
From 1986 to 1992 Modick wrote a monthly column on paperbacks for Die Zeit and from 1997 to 2002 for Die Tageszeitung. He has held a number of guest lectureships in Germany, the US and Japan (see below). He is a member of PEN Centre Germany and has received numerous awards.

Modick returned to live in Oldenburg in 2000 after spending several years abroad, including a year in Rome and another in Paris and 'three to four years' in the USA.

From 2000 to 2003 he was a member of the literary commission of the Lower Saxony Ministry for Science and the Arts, having previously received a number of awards from this body.

Modick is also an essayist and literary critic and has published several volumes of non-fiction writings including Das Stellen der Schrift, Milder Rausch and Ein Bild und tausend Worte.

== United States themes ==
Many of Modick's novels are concerned with German–American themes, for example, Die Schatten der Ideen, which tells the story of a German historian who emigrates to the US in 1935 and later finds himself swept up in the witch-hunts of the McCarthy Era. Other exile-themed novels include Sunset, which tells of the friendship between Bertolt Brecht and Lion Feuchtwanger whilst in Los Angeles in the early 1940s. Sunset was nominated in 2011 for the German Book Prize and the Wilhelm Raabe Literature Prize.

== Work as a translator ==
As a literary translator Modick has translated numerous English-language works into German including works by Aravind Adiga, Sebastian Faulks, William Gaddis, William Goldman, Sudhir Kakar, Victor LaValle, Andrew Motion, Jeffrey Moore, John O'Hara, Robert Olmstead, Matt Beynon Rees, Charles Simmons, Robert Louis Stevenson and Nathanael West.

Despite his high reputation in the German-speaking world and prolific output, Modick was not translated into English until 2020, when his novella Moos, translated by David Herman, was published under the title Moss by Bellevue Literary Press, New York, NY. A number of his works have English titles, reflecting the time Modick spent in the US.

== Bestseller ==
Modick's 2015 novel Konzert ohne Dichter, which tells of the difficult relationship between artist Heinrich Vogeler and poet Rainer Maria Rilke in 1905, became an almost immediate bestseller on publication.

Modick has enjoyed great critical acclaim in the German-speaking world.

== Selected works ==
- Moos (novella). Haffmans, Zürich 1984 ISBN 978-3-251-00034-0
- Moss (A novel). Translated by David Herman. Bellevue Literaray Press. New York. NY 2020 ISBN 978-1-942658-72-6
- Ins Blaue (novel). Machwerk, Siegen 1985 ISBN 978-3-499-15871-1
- Das Grau der Karolinen (novel). Rowohlt, Reinbek bei Hamburg 1986 ISBN 978-3-498-04295-0
- Weg war weg: Romanverschnitt (novel). Rowohlt, Reinbek bei Hamburg, 1988, ISBN 978-3-89598-518-8
- Das Stellen der Schrift (essays). Affholderbach & Strohmann, Siegen 1988 ISBN 978-3-922524-64-9
- Die Schrift vom Speicher (novel). Frankfurter Verlagsanstalt, Frankfurt am Main 1991 ISBN 978-3-627-10120-6
- Der Schatten, den die Hand wirft (sonnets). Frankfurter Verlagsanstalt, Frankfurt am Main 1991 ISBN 978-3-627-10121-3
- Das Licht in den Steinen (novel). Frankfurter Verlagsanstalt, Frankfurt am Main 1992 ISBN 978-3-596-11760-4
- Der Flügel (novel). Schöffling & Co, Frankfurt am Main 1994, ISBN 978-3-596-12969-0
- Das Kliff (novel). Schöffling & Co, Frankfurt am Main 1995 ISBN 3-89561-021-6
- Der Mann im Mast (novel). Schöffling & Co, Frankfurt am Main 1997, ISBN 978-3-492-24757-3
- Erste Lieben & andere Peinlichkeiten: Oldenburger Geschichten (short stories). Isensee Verlag, Oldenburg 1997, ISBN 978-3-89598-438-9
- Milder Rausch (essays and portraits). Eichborn, Frankfurt am Main 1999 ISBN 978-3-8218-0841-3
- Vierundzwanzig Türen (novel). Eichborn, Frankfurt am Main 2000 ISBN 978-3-423-20573-3
- September Song (novel). Eichborn, Frankfurt am Main 2002 ISBN 978-3-7632-5383-8
- Der kretische Gast (novel). Eichborn, Frankfurt am Main 2003, ISBN 978-3-492-24206-6
- Vatertagebuch, Eichborn, Frankfurt am Main 2005, ISBN 978-3-423-20573-3
- Bestseller (novel). Eichborn, Frankfurt am Main 2006, ISBN 978-3-492-25218-8
- Die Schatten der Ideen (novel). Eichborn, Frankfurt am Main 2008, ISBN 978-3-492-25443-4
- Krumme Touren (short stories). Eichborn, Frankfurt am Main 2010 ISBN 978-3-8218-0880-2
- Sunset (novel). Eichborn, Frankfurt am Main 2011, ISBN 978-3-8218-6117-3
- Klack (novel). Kiepenheuer & Witsch, Köln 2013, ISBN 978-3-462-04515-4
- Konzert ohne Dichter (novel). Kiepenheuer & Witsch, Köln 2015, ISBN 978-3-462-04741-7
- Ein Bild und tausend Worte. Die Entstehungsgeschichte von "Konzert ohne Dichter" und andere Essays, Kiepenheuer & Witsch, Köln 2016, ISBN 978-3-462-04926-8
- Keyserlings Geheimnis (novel). Kiepenheuer & Witsch, Köln 2018, ISBN 978-3-462-05156-8
- Leonard Cohen (novella). KIWI Musikbibliothek Band 5. Kiepenheuer & Witsch, Köln 2020. ISBN 978-3-462-05380-7.
- Fahrtwind (novel). Kiepenheuer & Witsch, Köln 2021. ISBN 978-3-462-00130-3.
- Nachlese. Hundert Bücher – Ein Jahrhundert. (literary criticism) Onomato. . Düsseldorf 2024. ISBN 978-3-949899-22-5.

== Awards ==
- 1986 Hamburger Literaturförderpreis
- 1989 Art Prize (Literature) Lower Saxony
- 1990/91 Stipendium of the Villa Massimo, Rom
- 1993/94 Stipendium of the Cité internationale des arts, Paris
- 1994 Bettina-von-Arnim-Preis
- 1996 Writer in Residence, University of Poitiers
- 1998 Annual Stipendium in Literature, Lower Saxony
- 2000 Märkischer Autorenpreis
- 2005 Nicolas Born Prize
- 2006 Elba-Stipendium Thyll-Dürr-Stiftung
- 2007/08 Stipendium Deutscher Literaturfonds
- 2009 Stipendium Villa Aurora / Los Angeles
- 2012 Writer in residence, Heinrich-Böll-Cottage, Achill Island, Ireland
- 2013 Stipendium Deutscher Literaturfonds
- 2015 Rheingau Literatur Preis for Konzert ohne Dichter
- 2015 Poet in residence, University of Duisburg-Essen
- 2020 Hannelore Greve Literature Prize

== Guest lectureships ==
- 1992 Writer in Residence, Keio-University, Tokyo
- 1994 to 2005 Guest professor, Middlebury College, Vermont/US
- 1995 Guest professor, Dartmouth College, New Hampshire/US
- 1996 to 2002 Lecturer in Poetry, Creative Writing, University of Bielefeld
- 1996 Writer in Residence, Allegheny College, Pennsylvania/US
- 1998 to 1999 Guest professor, German Literature Institute Leipzig

== Works about Modick (in German) ==
- David-Christopher Assmann & Eva Geulen: Zur gesellschaftlichen Lage der Literatur (mit einer Fallstudie zu Klaus Modick), in: WestEnd. Neue Zeitschrift für Sozialforschung 9 (2012), Vol. 2, pp. 18–46.
- Dirk Frank: Narrative Gedankenspiele. Der metafiktionale Roman zwischen Modernismus und Postmodernismus. Wiesbaden 2001.
- Sabine Jambon: Moos, Störfall und abruptes Ende, Düsseldorf 1999
- Von Lust und Last literarischen Schreibens. Ein Blick in die Werkstatt deutscher Scriftsteller. Klaus Modick and Helmut Mörchen, Eichborn 2001 ISBN 978-3-8218-0888-8
- Helmut Mörchen: Klaus Modick – ein Gegenwartsautor, den man kennen sollte. Neue Gesellschaft/Frankfurter Volume 5/2011.
- Josua Novak: Der postmoderne komische Roman. Marburg 2009.
- Harry Nutt: Tiefbohrungen ins Blaue. Über den Schriftsteller Klaus Modick. Merkur 11/1988.
- Janina Richts: Inszenierungen von Autor-Kritiker-Verhältnissen in der deutschsprachigen Gegenwartsliteratur. München 2009.
- Ralf Schnell: Geschichte der deutschsprachigen Literatur seit 1945. Stuttgart 2005.
- Bernd Stenzig: Rilke und Vogeler: Irreführungen in Klaus Modicks "Konzert ohne Dichter". Karl-Robert Schütze, Berlin 2015, ISBN 978-3-928589-31-4
- Hubert Winkels: Postmoderne leicht gemacht – Klaus Modick und die Rückkehr der Familie. In: Hubert Winkels: Kann man Bücher lieben? Köln 2010.
- Dieter Wrobel: Postmodernes Chaos – Chaotische Postmoderne. Eine Studie zu Analogien zwischen Chaostheorie und deutschsprachiger Prosa der Postmoderne. Bielefeld 1998.
