= Margarete Hannsmann =

German writer

Margarete Dorothea Hannsmann (née Wurster; February 10, 1921 – March 29, 2007) was a German writer, best remembered for her numerous volumes of poetry, prose, travelogues, and radio plays. She was awarded the Schubart-Literaturpreis in 1976, the Johann-Friedrich-von-Cotta-Literatur- und Übersetzerpreis der Landeshauptstadt Stuttgart in 1980, and the Order of Merit of the Federal Republic of Germany in 1982. She also wrote under the pseudonym Sancho Pansa.
