= María Cecilia Barbetta =

Argentinean writer

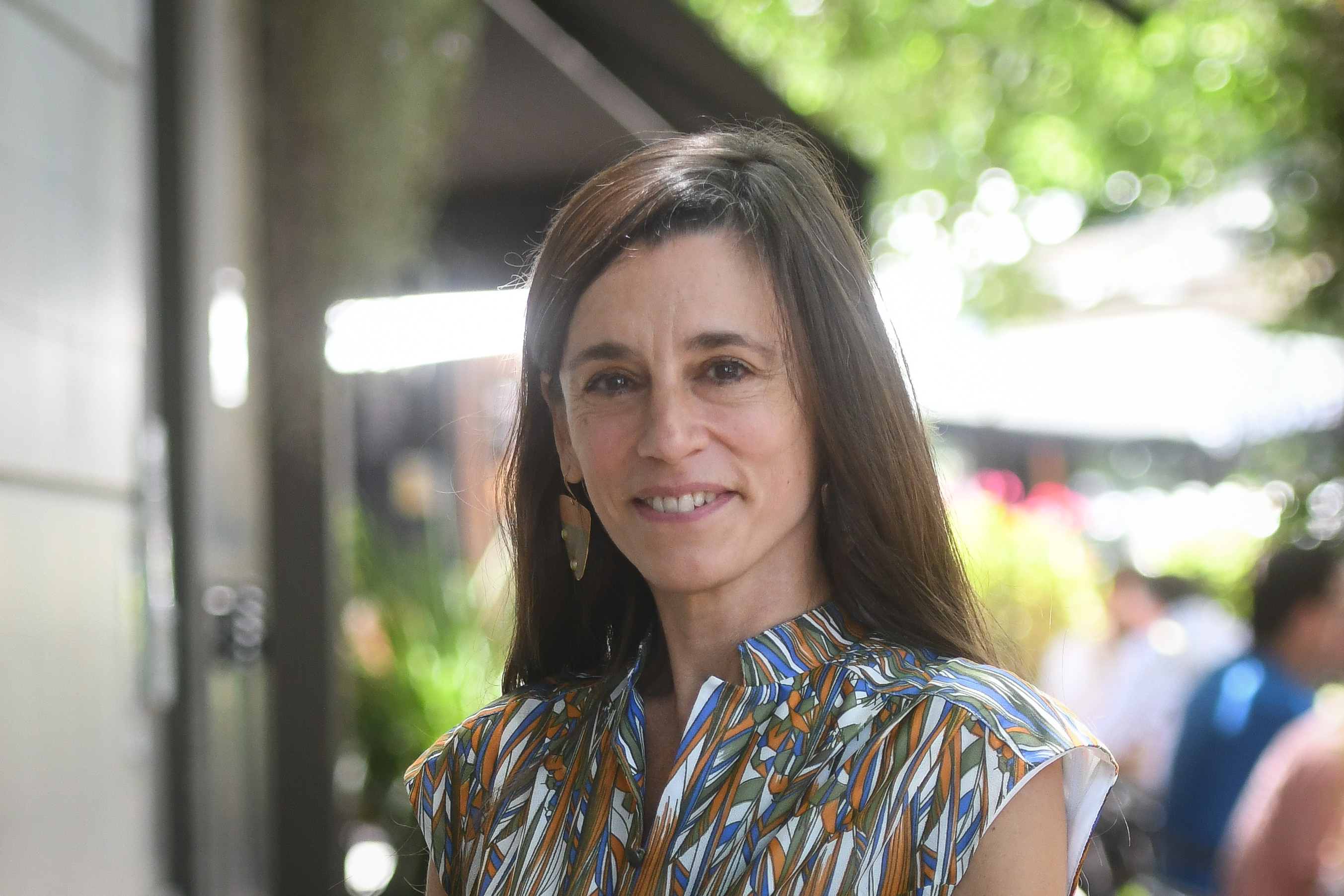
Maria Cecilia Barbetta, Buenos Aires, November 2023

María Cecilia Barbetta (born 8 July 1972 in Buenos Aires) is a German-language writer. Since 2011 she is a member of the PEN Centre Germany. In 2008, she won the Aspekte-Literaturpreis.

== Life ==
Barbetta studied German as a foreign language in her native Argentina. She came to Berlin in 1996 with a DAAD scholarship. After completing her doctorate at the Free University of Berlin in 2000, she has been a freelance author (since 2005). In 2007 she was awarded the Alfred Döblin Fellowship by the Academy of Arts, Berlin, and participated in the author's workshop Prosa of the Literary Colloquium in Berlin. Los Milagros Tailor's Shop was her first novel. She spent the year 2013 at Villa Massimo in Rome. In 2014 she received scholarships from the Berlin Senate and the German Literature Fund Darmstadt. She writes in German and has lived in Berlin since 1996.

== Awards ==
- 2008 Aspekte-Literaturpreis
- 2009 Adelbert von Chamisso-Förderpreis
- 2017 Alfred Döblin Prize

=== Memberships ===
- 2011 PEN Centre Germany

== Works ==
- Barbetta, María Cecilia (2008). Änderungsschneiderei Los Milagros : roman (in German). Frankfurt am Main: S. Fischer. ISBN 978-3-596-18285-5. OCLC 259726437.
- Barbetta, María Cecilia (2018). Nachtleuchten Roman (in German). Frankfurt am Main: S. Fischer Verlag GmbH. ISBN 978-3-10-397289-4. OCLC 1033642805.
- Rothschild, Miguel; Barbetta, María Cecilia; Bismarck, Beatrice von; Currid, Brian (2015). Miguel Rothschild (in German). Ostfildern, Germany: Hatje Cantz. ISBN 978-3-7757-4024-1. OCLC 910103377.
