= Thomas Stangl (writer) =

Austrian writer (born 1966)

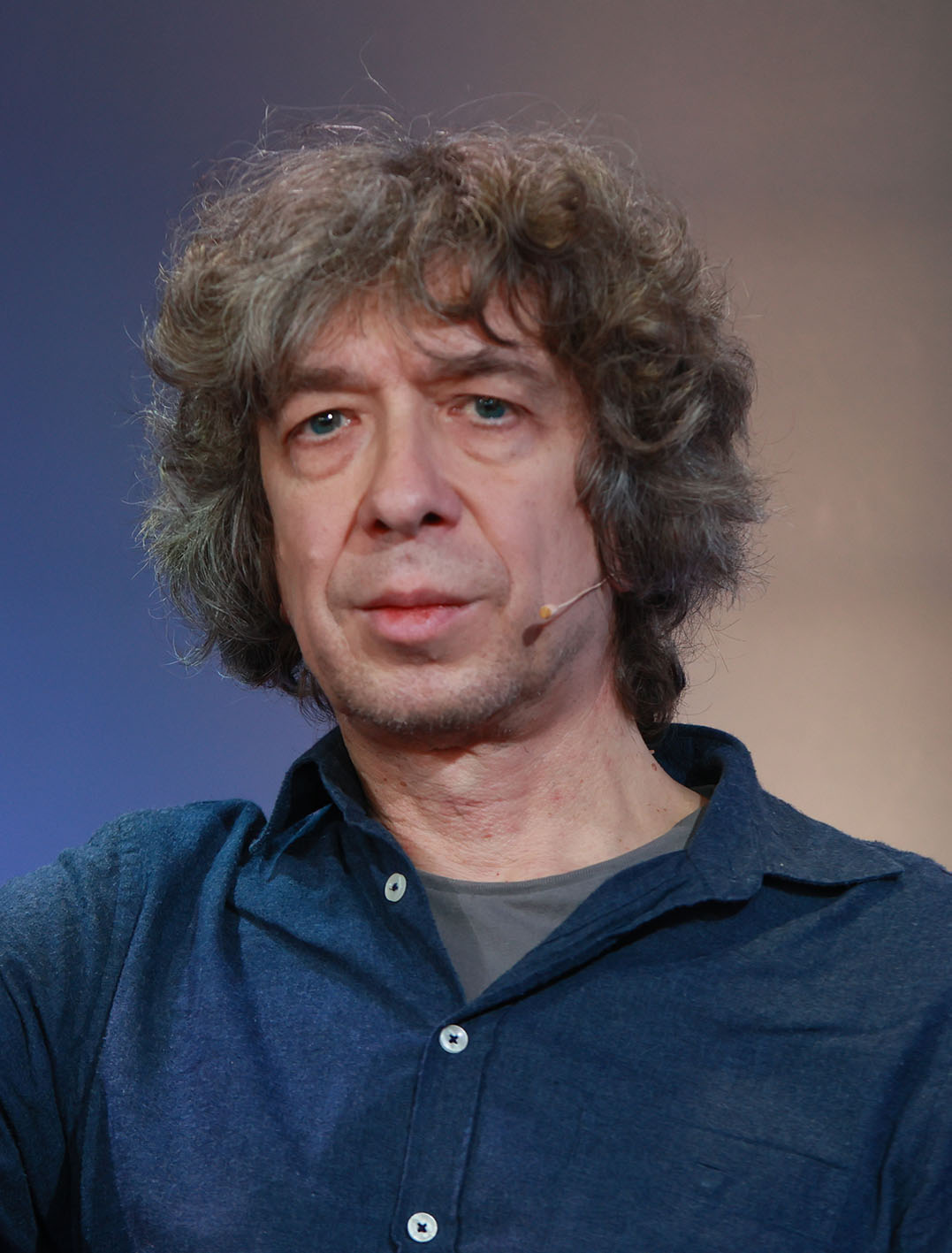
- Thomas Stangl, Frankfurt Book Fair 2022
- Born: 4 January 1966 (age 60); Vienna, Austria
- Education: University of Vienna
- Writing career
- Language: German
- Genre: Novelist

Thomas Stangl (born 4 January 1966 in Vienna) is an Austrian writer.

== Life ==
Thomas Stangl studied philosophy and Spanish at the University of Vienna and graduated in 1991 with a thesis on deconstructive literary theory. After graduation, he initially wrote essays, book reviews, and even smaller prose work for newspapers and literary journals.

Thomas Stangl lives in Vienna.

== Honours ==
For his debut novel Der einzige Ort (The only place) the author received the Aspekte-Literaturpreis in 2004, the same year a Hermann-Lenz Scholarship, and the 2005 Literature Prize of the Austrian Federal Chancellery. In June 2007, he received the Telekom Austria Prize at the Ingeborg Bachmann competition; in October 2007, the Literature Prize of the Cultural Committee of German Economy, 2009, a grant from the Heinrich-Heine-house of the city of Lüneburg, 2010 Literature Prize Alpha and the 2011 Erich Fried Prize. In 2020, he received the Johann-Friedrich-von-Cotta-Literatur- und Übersetzerpreis der Landeshauptstadt Stuttgart.

== Works ==
- Der einzige Ort. Novel, Droschl, Graz 2004, ISBN 978-3-85420-649-1.
- Ihre Musik. Novel, Droschl, Graz 2006, ISBN 978-3-85420-709-2.
- Was kommt. Novel, Droschl, Graz 2009, ISBN 978-3-85420-752-8.
- Reisen und Gespenster. Essays, Droschl, Graz 2012, ISBN 978-3-85420-791-7.
- Regeln des Tanzes, Novel, Droschl, Graz 2013, ISBN 978-3-85420-649-1
- Freiheit und Langweile. Essays. Droschl, Graz 2016, ISBN 978-3-85420-981-2.
- Fremde Verwandtschaften. Roman. Droschl, Graz 2018, ISBN 978-3-99059-009-6.
- Die Geschichte des Körpers. Erzählungen. Droschl, Graz 2019, ISBN 978-3-99059-037-9.
- Quecksilberlicht. Roman. Matthes & Seitz, Berlin 2022, ISBN 978-3-7518-0084-6.
- Über gute und böse Literatur – Korrespondenz über das Schreiben (with Anne Weber). Matthes & Seitz, Berlin 2022, ISBN 978-3-7518-0074-7.
- Diverse Wunder. Ein paar Handvoll sehr kurzer Geschichten. Droschl, Graz 2023, ISBN 9783990591253.
