= Johann-Friedrich-von-Cotta-Literatur- und Übersetzerpreis der Landeshauptstadt Stuttgart =

Literary and translation award

The Johann-Friedrich-von-Cotta-Literatur- und Übersetzerpreis der Landeshauptstadt Stuttgart is a literary prize awarded in Baden-Württemberg, Germany, awarded every three years to writers and translators. The prize is endowed with €20,000.

== Winners ==
- 2005
  - Writer: Petra Morsbach
  - Translator: Michael Walter
- 2008
  - Writer: Egon Schwarz
  - Translator: Hartmut Köhler
- 2011
  - Writer: Günter Herburger
  - Translator: Claudia Ott
- 2014
  - Writer: Ulrike Edschmid
  - Translator: Joachim Kalka
- 2017
  - Writer: Peter Stamm
  - Translator: Petra Strien
- 2020
  - Writer: Thomas Stangl
  - Translator: Claudia Steinitz

=== Literaturpreis der Stadt Stuttgart ===
From 1978 to 2002 this prize was known as City of Stuttgart Literary Prize.

- 1978
  - Writer: Werner Dürrson
  - Writer: Roland Lang
  - Translator: Fritz Vogelgsang
- 1980
  - Writer: Irmela Brender
  - Writer: Margarete Hannsmann
  - Translator: Otto Bayer
- 1982
  - Writer: Friederike Roth
  - Writer: Franz Mechsner
  - Translator: Ragni Maria Seidl-Gschwend
- 1984
  - Writer: Otto Jägersberg
  - Writer: Jochen Kelter
  - Translator: Hans Hermann
- 1986
  - Writer: Walter Helmut Fritz
  - Writer: Christoph Lippelt
  - Translator: Elke Weh
- 1988
  - Writer: Ludwig Greve
  - Writer: Hanns-Josef Ortheil
  - Translator: Maria Csollán
- 1990
  - Writer: Zsuzsanna Gahse
  - Writer: Johannes Poethen
  - Translator: Rosemarie Tietze
- 1992
  - Writer: Tina Stroheker
  - Writer: Rolf Vollmann
  - Translator: Helga Pfetsch
- 1994
  - Writer: Albrecht Goes
  - Writer: Reinhard Gröper
  - Translator: Barbara Henninges
- 1996
  - Writer: Maria Beig
  - Translator: Willi Zurbrüggen
- 1998
  - Writer: Hermann Kinder
  - Translator: Hildegard Grosche
- 2000
  - Writer: Peter O. Chotjewitz
  - Translator: Nikolaus Stingl
- 2002
  - Writer: Jürgen Lodemann
  - Translator: Ralph Dutli
