= Timo Brunke =

German slam poet

Timo Brunke (born March 11, 1972) is a German slam poet. He won the 2011 Schubart-Literaturpreis.

== Life ==
Timo Brunke was born in Stuttgart, West Germany. During his school days he participated in literary cabaret and developed since the late 1980s, initially from there, then starting in the late 1990s as the protagonist and networker of German poetry slam scene, their own forms of play poetry, spoken word, the Slam Poetry and experimental poetry.

Brunke studied from 1994 to 1998 Protestant theology at the University of Tübingen. From 1994 to 1998, he was an active member of the group of authors timber market in Tübingen. From 1998 to 2000, he studied acting training at Frieder Nögge and took between 2002 and 2006 to Christof Stählin Mainz Academy of Poetry and Music SAGO.

In 1999, he founded the Stuttgart Poetry Slam, which he held until 2008 in the local club Rosenau. Since 2001, he is head of the Experimental Language Workshop "and word games" in the literary Stuttgart In 2006, he accompanied Bas Böttcher with the textbox project to Paris (Centre Pompidou), Beijing, Berlin (New National Gallery), Abu Dhabi and Bangkok, as well as in May 2008 to Madrid.

Brunke works and lives with his family in Stuttgart since September 2009, and writes columns for the Stuttgarter Zeitung.

== Works ==
=== Solo programs ===
- Lyrische Pfirsiche (1993)
- Mundschellen in Hülle – Ohrfeigen in Fülle (1995)
- Der Große Trinkspruch vom Ersten und vom Nächsten Schluck (1996)
- Die Weisheit der Jordanbinse (1998)
- Verselust (2000)
- per vers (2001)
- Pension Brunke (2004)
- Vom Verstand in den Mund (2006)
- All das. All diese Dinge. (2007)
- Vom Übergang des Abendlandes - Slampoesie an Musik mit Scott Roller (2011)

=== Literature ===
- Warum heißt das so? Eine Sammlung von erstaunlichen Wort-Geschichten. Klett Kinderbuch Verlag. (2009) ISBN 3-941411-07-1
- Gedichtbände Erpichte Gedichte - Lyrische Pfirsiche. Verlag Reiner Brouwer (1996). Edition Isele (2005)
- Die Läuterlabe - ein Versdramolett. Verlag Reiner Brouwer (1997)
- Lappalie Lapsus und Lapidar Läppisch in: Die Läuterlabe. Edition Isele (2005)
- Beiträge in diversen Anthologien DAS Gedicht. Nr. x hg. Von Anton G. Leitner
- Himmelhochjauchzend – zu Tode betrübt. dtv-Taschenbuch
- Slam! Poetry. Killroy Media.
- Das Heft, das seinen langen Namen ändern wollte. Sommer (2006)
- Slam Poetry. hrsg. von Petra Anders, Reclam Verlag (2008)

=== Spoken word ===
- Pastiorale – Hommage an Oskar Pastior für sieben Sprechstimmen (2007)
- Kommunikazumutung – Verzweit UA (2008)

=== Recordings ===
- Lyrik zwei (4 Audio CDs) Verlag: Dhv der Hörverlag (2002) ISBN 3-89584-987-1
- All das. All diese Dinge (Audio-CD) Verlag: Der gesunde Menschenverstand (März 2006) ISBN 3-9522993-3-2.
