= Ulla Hahn =

German poet and novelist

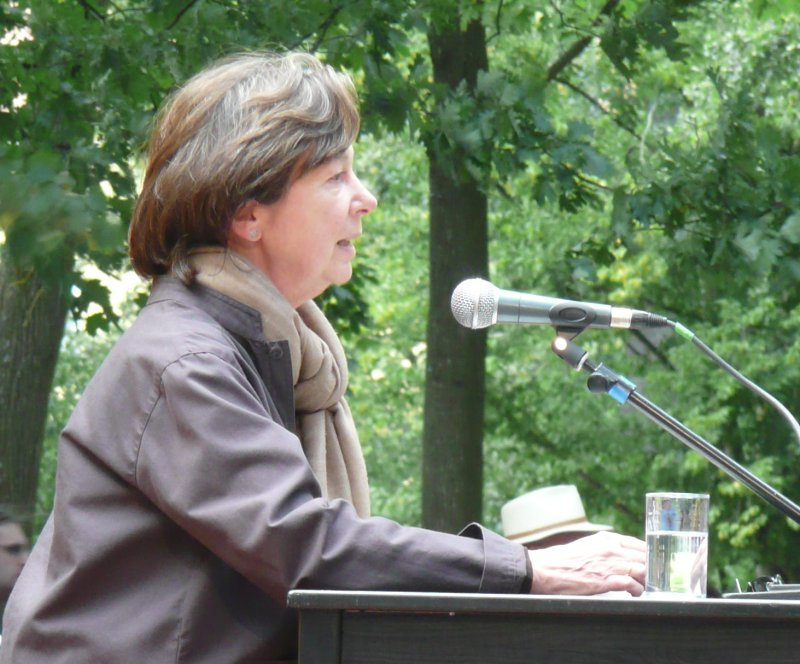
Ulla Hahn.

Ulla Hahn is a German poet and novelist.

== Partial bibliography ==
=== Poetry collections ===
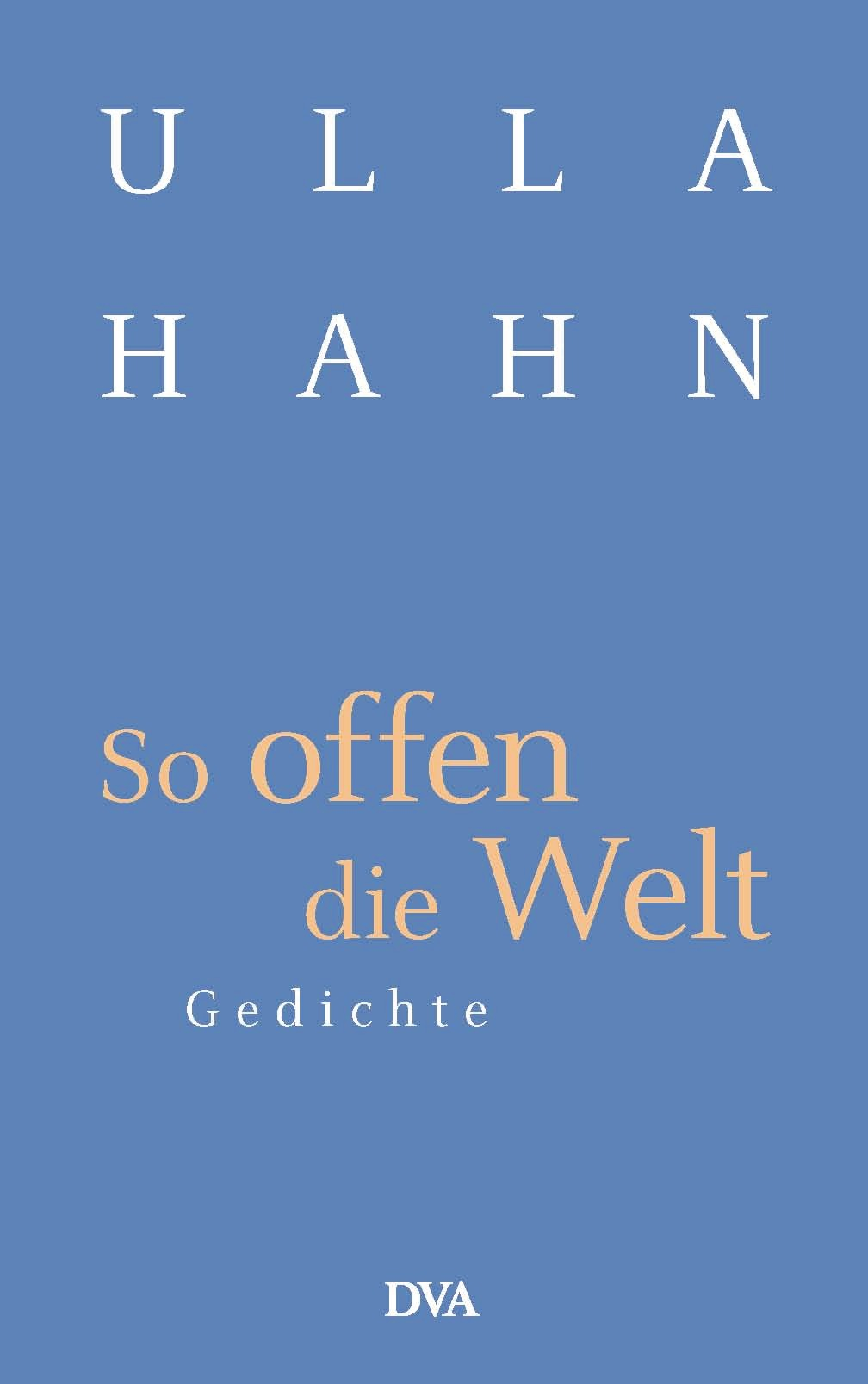
Poetry

- Herz über Kopf (1981), ISBN 3-421-06073-8
- Spielende (1983), ISBN 3-421-06155-6
- Unerhörte Nähe (1988), ISBN 3-421-06310-9
- Freudenfeuer (1989), ISBN 3-421-06277-3
- Liebesgedichte (1993), ISBN 3-421-06655-8
- Epikurs Garten (1995), ISBN 3-421-05009-0
- Galileo und zwei Frauen (1997), ISBN 3-421-05073-2
- Bildlich gesprochen (1999), ISBN 3-89584-728-3
- Süßapfel rot (2003), ISBN 3-15-018249-2
- So offen die Welt (2004), ISBN 3-421-05816-4

=== Novels ===
- Ein Mann im Haus (1991), ISBN 3-423-12745-7
- Das verborgene Wort (2001), ISBN 3-423-13089-X
- Unscharfe Bilder (2003), ISBN 3-423-13320-1

== Awards ==
- 1985 Friedrich-Hölderlin-Preis for Aufbruch
- 1986 Roswitha Prize
- 2018 Hannelore Greve Literature Prize
