= Zoë Jenny =

Swiss writer (born 1974)

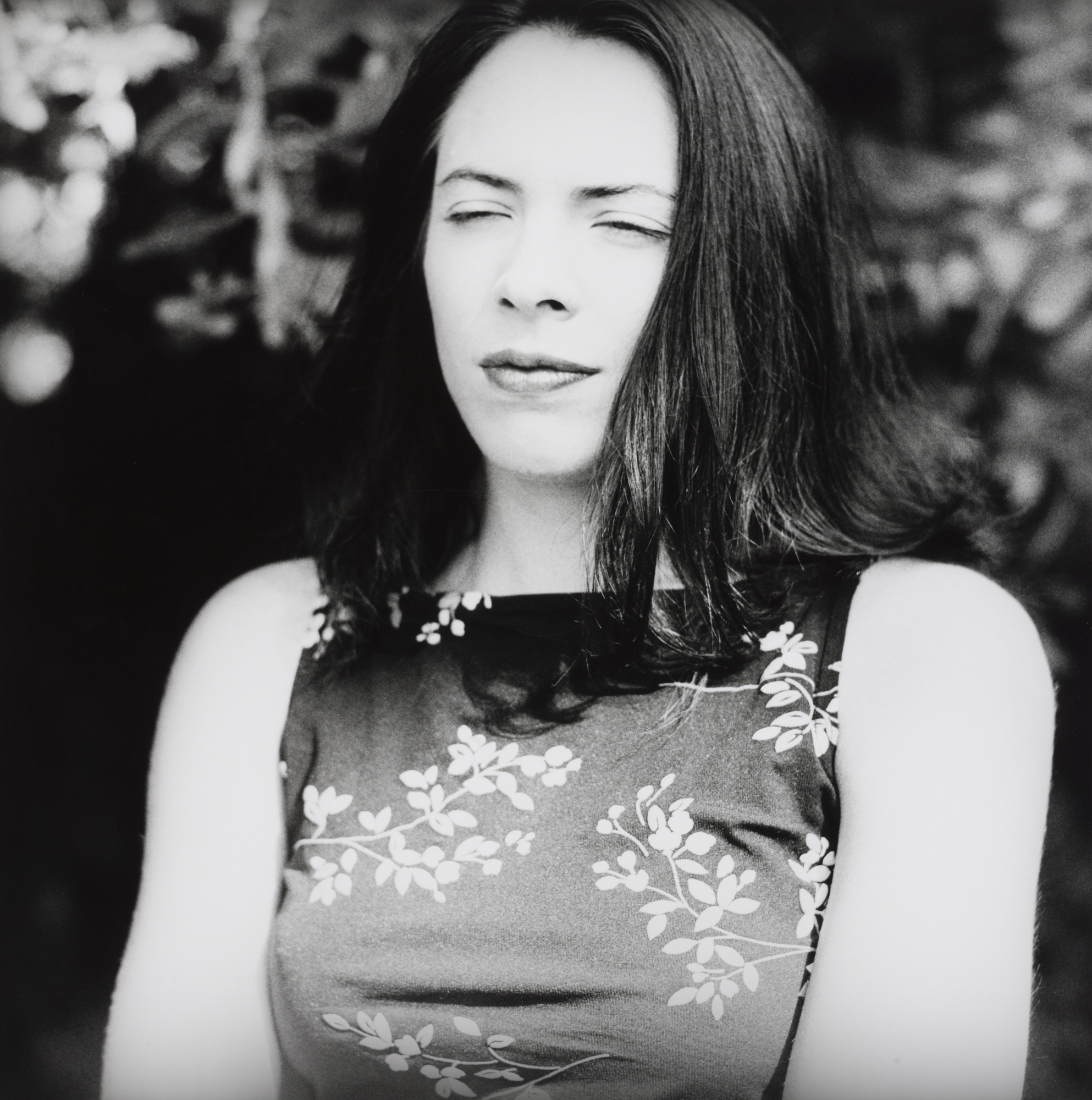
Zoë Jenny (2002)

Zoë Jenny (born 16 March 1974 in Basel, Switzerland) is a Swiss writer. Her first novel, The Pollen Room, was published in German in 1997 and has been translated into 27 languages. She was awarded the Aspekte-Literaturpreis for The Pollen Room. Her novel, The Sky is Changing, was her first written in English and was published by Legend Press in June 2010. She has since returned to writing in German, publishing several novels and a children's book.

== Life ==
Jenny was born in Basel, Switzerland, and grew up in Greece, Basel and Ticino. Her father was Matthyas Jenny, a Swiss publisher and literary activist. Her first published works were short stories, which she submitted to German-language literary magazines. Jenny's first novel, Das Blütenstaubzimmer (The Pollen Room), was published in German in 1997 and has been translated into 27 languages. She lived in London after The Pollen Room was published. In 2008, she married Matthew Homfray, a British veterinary surgeon and pharmaceuticals consultant. Her newest novel, The Sky is Changing, was her first written in English and was published by Legend Press in June 2010. She was awarded the Aspekte-Literaturpreis in 1997 for The Pollen Room. Jenny lives in Vienna and has also lived in Tuscany and Zurich. In 2024 she published a children's book, Nachts werden alle Wünsche wahr. In 2025 she revealed her next novel would involve a therapist in Vienna as the protagonist.

Jenny also wrote the script for a short film, In nuce, which she made with her brother Camper Jenny. The film was shown by two German television stations. She served on the jury for the Locarno Film Festival.

== Bibliography ==
- Jenny, Zoë (1997). Das Blütenstaubzimmer : Roman (in German). Frankfurt am Main: Frankfurter Verlagsanstalt. ISBN 3-627-00052-8. OCLC 37936491.
- —— (2000). Der Ruf des Muschelhorns Roman (in German). Frankfurt am Main: Frankfurter Verlagsanstalt. ISBN 978-3-627-00073-8. OCLC 247262987.
- —— (2002). Ein schnelles Leben : Roman (in German). Berlin: Aufbau-Verlag. ISBN 3-351-02951-9. OCLC 50569051.
- —— (2007). Das Portrait : Roman (in German). Frankfurt am Main: Frankfurter Verlagsanstalt. ISBN 978-3-627-00142-1. OCLC 173070827.
- —— (2013). Spätestens morgen : Erzählungen (in German). Frankfurt am Main: Frankfurter Verlagsanstalt. ISBN 978-3-627-00197-1. OCLC 857326925.
- —— (2022). Der verschwundene Mond Roman (in German). Frankfurt am Main: Frankfurter Verlagsanstalt. ISBN 978-3-627-00296-1. OCLC 1309099001.

=== For children ===
- Jenny, Zoë; Pfarr, Bernd (2001). Mittelpünktchens Reise um die Welt (in German). München: Hanser. ISBN 978-3-446-20006-7. OCLC 231869180.

=== Written in English ===
- Jenny, Zoë (2010). The sky is changing. London: Legend. ISBN 978-1-907756-40-5. OCLC 813959848.

=== English translations ===
- Jenny, Zoë; Gaffney, Elizabeth (1999). The pollen room : a novel. New York: Simon & Schuster. ISBN 0-684-85458-9. OCLC 40126879.
