= Jegławki =

- Village
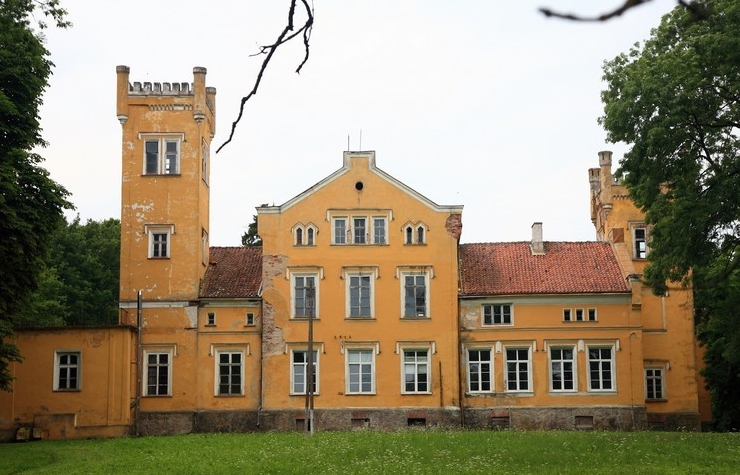
- Neo-Gothic manor house

- Location within Poland
- Coordinates: 54°14′N 21°27′E
- Country: Poland
- Voivodeship: Warmian-Masurian
- County: Kętrzyn
- Gmina: Srokowo

Jegławki [jɛˈɡwafki] is a village in the administrative district of Gmina Srokowo, within Kętrzyn County, Warmian-Masurian Voivodeship, in northern Poland, close to the border with the Kaliningrad Oblast of Russia.

== Notable residents ==
- Arno Surminski (born 1934), German writer
