= Nicolas Born Prize =

The Nicolas Born Prize, awarded by the German state of Lower Saxony, is a literary prize given since 2000 in honour of the writer Nicolas Born. It is awarded to notable German-language writers from Germany, Austria and Switzerland. The main prize is currently 20,000 Euros, and since 2015 a further 10,000 Euro prize has been awarded to a debut author.

== Winners since 2000 ==
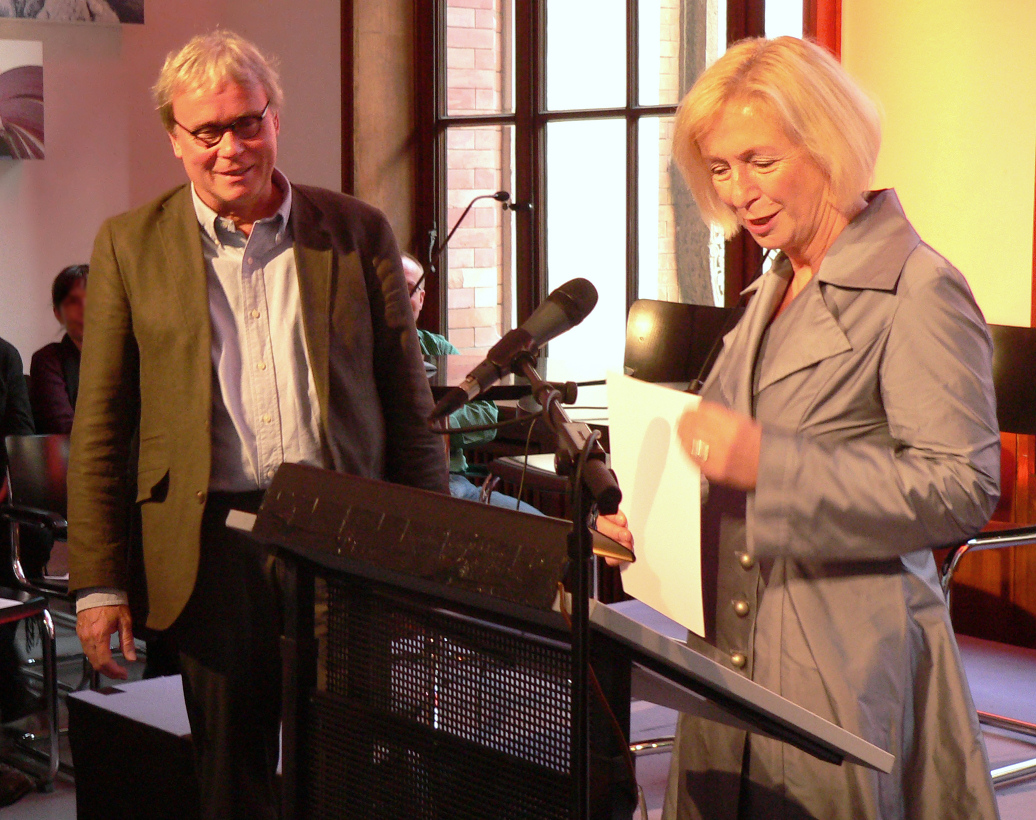
Award 2011 to Peter Waterhouse by the Lower Saxony Minister for Science and Culture Johanna Wanka in the Künstlerhaus Hannover

- 2000 Adam Seide, Debut prize, Henning Ahrens
- 2001 Jan Philipp Reemtsma, Debut prize, Frank Schulz, Kirsten John
- 2002 Walter Kempowski, Debut prize, Matthias Jendis
- 2003 Peter Rühmkorf, Debut prize, Mariana Leky
- 2004 Felicitas Hoppe, Debut prize, Franziska Gerstenberg
- 2005 Klaus Modick, Debut prize, Jörg Gronius
- 2006 John von Düffel, Debut prize, Paul Brodowsky
- 2007 Hanns-Josef Ortheil, Debut prize, Rabea Edel
- 2008 Hans Pleschinski, Debut prize, Finn Ole Heinrich
- 2009 Henning Ahrens, Debut prize, Thomas Klupp
- 2010 Gerd-Peter Eigner, Debut prize, Leif Randt
- 2011 Peter Waterhouse, Debut prize, Sabrina Janesch
- 2012 Jan Peter Bremer, Debut prize, Jan Brandt
- 2013 Gerhard Henschel, Debut prize, Florian Kessler
- 2015 Lukas Bärfuss, Debut prize, Daniela Krien
- 2016 Ulrike Draesner, Debut prize, Joachim Meyerhoff
- 2017 Franzobel, Debut prize, Julia Wolf
- 2018 Christoph Ransmayr, Debut prize, Lisa Kreißler
- 2020 Judith Schalansky, Debut prize, Thilo Krause
- 2022 Dorothee Elmiger, Debut prize, Yade Yasemin Önder
