= Friederike Roth =

German writer and playwright

Friederike Roth (born 6 April 1948) is a German writer. She is especially active as a playwright.

Roth was born in Sindelfingen. She won the City of Stuttgart Literary Prize in 1982 and the Ingeborg Bachmann Prize in 1983.
