= Arno Surminski =

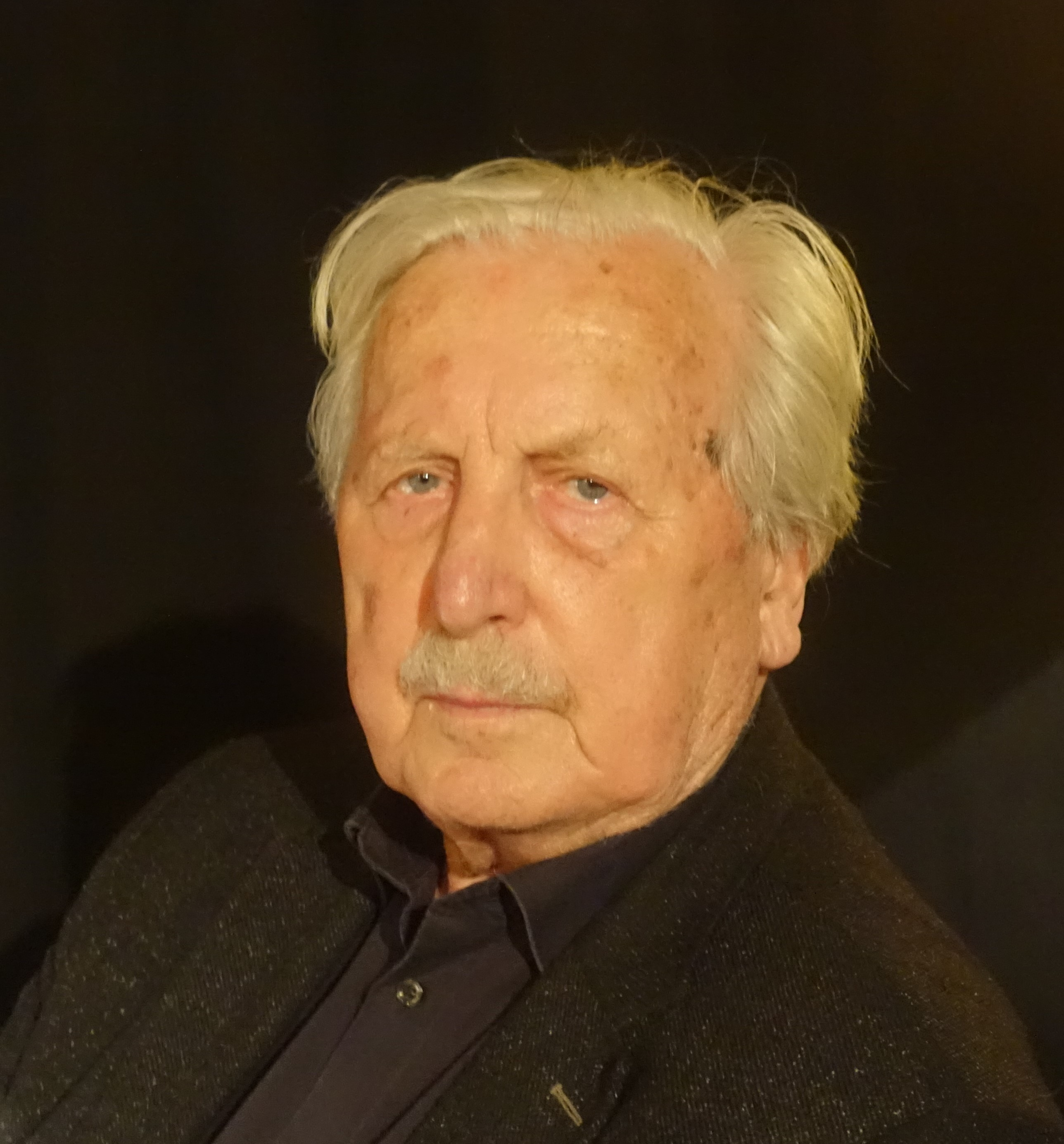
Arno Surminski (2024)

Arno Surminski (born 20 August 1934 in Jäglack, East Prussia) is a German writer, living in Hamburg, a father of three and a grandfather of 8.

After growing up in East Prussia, his parents were deported to the Soviet Union, while he was expelled to Schleswig-Holstein. Having finished his school education there, he was apprenticed to a lawyer from 1950 to 1953.

He lived in Canada from 1957 to 1960 working as a lumberjack, but then came back to Hamburg, Germany, where he worked for an insurance company from 1962 until 1972.

Since 1972, apart from writing, he has been working as a journalist, specialising in economics and insurance. His fame is mainly due to his novels, the principal themes of which are his recollections of a happy childhood and the fate of the deportees; he has no interest however in revenge, but only wants to preserve his childhood memories. Several of his books were used for TV productions.

Since 2001, he has been working as an ombudsman in the field of health insurance.

== Books by Surminski ==
- Jokehnen oder Wie lange fährt man von Ostpreußen nach Deutschland? ISBN 3-550-08328-9
- Aus dem Nest gefallen
- Kudenow oder An fremden Wassern weinen
- Fremdes Land oder Als die Freiheit noch zu haben war
- Wie Königsberg im Winter
- Polninken oder Eine deutsche Liebe
- Grunowen oder das vergangene Leben
- Gewitter im Januar
- Malojawind. Eine Liebesgeschichte
- Aus dem Leben eines Buchhändlers
- Das dunkle Ende des Regenbogens
- Damals in Poggenwalde
- Kein schöner Land
- Besuch aus Stralsund
- Sommer 44 oder Wie lange fährt man von Deutschland nach Ostpreußen?
- Die masurischen Könige
- Eine gewisse Karriere
- Die Kinder von Moorhusen
- Der Winter der Tiere
- Vaterland ohne Väter
- Gruschelke und Engelmanke
- Die Vogelwelt von Auschwitz, ISBN 978-3-7844-3126-0
- Das alte Ostpreussen

== Awards ==
- 1978 Andreas Gryphius Prize
- 1982 Kulturpreis der Landsmannschaft Ostpreußen für Literatur
- 1993 Hamburger Bürgerpreis
- 2001 Lessing-Ring zusammen mit dem Kulturpreis der deutschen Freimaurer
- 2004 Friedrich-Schiedel-Literaturpreis der Stadt Bad Wurzach; Biermann-Ratjen-Medaille der Freien und Hansestadt Hamburg
- 2008 Hannelore Greve Literature Prize
