= Zsuzsa Bánk =

German writer (born 1965)

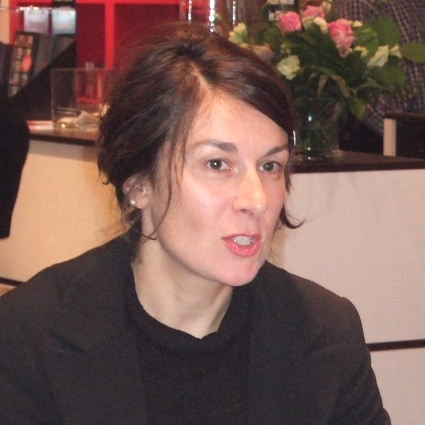
- Bánk in 2006
- Born: 24 October 1965 (age 60); Frankfurt am Main, West Germany
- Education: University of Mainz
- Occupation: Writer
- Awards: Aspekte-Literaturpreis 2002 Der Schwimmer; Adelbert von Chamisso Prize 2004

Zsuzsa Bánk (born 24 October 1965 in Frankfurt am Main) is a German writer.

== Early life and education ==
Her parents moved to Germany after the Hungarian revolution of 1956 and she studied journalism, political science and literature at the Johannes Gutenberg University Mainz and in Washington, D.C.

== Career and awards ==
She has received several literature awards, including the 2002 Aspekte-Literaturpreis given to the best debut novel written in German and the 2004 Adelbert von Chamisso Prize.

== Personal life ==
She lives in Frankfurt am Main with her husband and two children.

== Works ==
- Bánk, Zsuzsa (2002). Der Schwimmer : Roman (in German). Frankfurt am Main: Fischer Taschenbuch Verlag. ISBN 3-596-15248-8. OCLC 57362382.
- Bánk, Zsuzsa (2005). Heissester Sommer : Erzählungen (in German). Frankfurt am Main: S. Fischer. ISBN 3-10-005221-8. OCLC 61386565.
- Bánk, Zsuzsa (2011). Die hellen Tage Roman (in German). Frankfurt am Main: S. Fischer. ISBN 978-3-10-005222-3. OCLC 706878570.
