= Claudia Ott =

German scholar of Middle-Eastern languages, translator and musician, born 1968

- Born: 1978 (age 47–48); Tübingen, West Germany
- Education: University of Tübingen, Free University of Berlin (PhD)
- Occupations: Arabist, translator and musician
- Writing career
- Years active: 2003–present
- Notable works: German translation of One Thousand and One Nights, 2004
- Notable awards: Johann-Friedrich-von-Cotta Award
- Website: Official website in German

Claudia Ott (born 1968 in Tübingen) is a German scholar of Middle-Eastern languages, literary translator and musician. She is mainly known for her 2004 German translations based on the oldest existing Arabic manuscript of the One Thousand and One Nights and similar medieval works of classical Arabic literature. In her public as well as in recorded performances, Ott has presented this genre of Arabic epic literature in the tradition of an oral storyteller, accompanied by live Arabic music.

== Life and career ==
=== Academic career ===
Ott read Islamic, Arabic and other Oriental languages from 1986 to 1988 at the Hebrew University of Jerusalem and from 1988 to 1992 at the University of Tübingen. She received her PhD in Arab studies from the Free University of Berlin in 1998 with a thesis on Arabic epic poetry titled Metamorphosen des Epos. From 1993 to 1998 she was a research assistant at the School of Semitic and Arabic Studies at the Free University of Berlin. This was followed by a stay in Cairo to study Arabic music and ney, as well as to conduct musicological research.

From 2000 to 2013 she worked as research assistant at the Department of Oriental Philology at the University of Erlangen-Nuremberg. Since 2013 she has been a lecturer and associate member of the Department of Arabic and Islamic Studies at the University of Göttingen. In 2022 she was appointed honorary professor for Arabic Studies at the same university.

=== Musical career ===
In addition to her academic work, Ott has been a member of several international ensembles for Oriental music and has created her own programmes including Arabic music and Oriental literature. As a musician, translator and presenter, she has collaborated with the Nuremberg Symphony Orchestra, the Göttingen International Handel-Festival as well as with artists Mahmud Darwish, Mohamed Mounir, Abdo Dagher and Gamal al-Ghitany among others. In 2001 and 2004, she presented musical programmes for literary readings by Nobel Prize winner Günter Grass on his visits to Yemen. Further, she is a certified musician for church music and has been directing the Saint Martin's choir in the village of Beedenbostel.

=== Career as literary translator ===
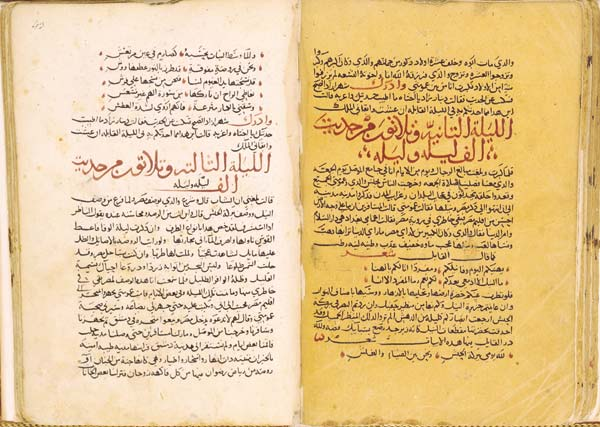
Oldest existing Arabic manuscript of The Nights, 14th century, from Syria

Since 1992, Ott has written as author and translator for various German broadcasting stations and newspapers. Starting in 2000, she began working as a freelance literary translator from Arabic into German. Based on the oldest existing Arabic manuscript of the One Thousand and One Nights in the critical edition by Muhsin Mahdi, she published her German translation consisting of 282 stories on 700 pages in 2004.

Commenting on the historical literary character of The Nights, Ott referred to their use in oral storytelling as a form of popular entertainment in traditional Oriental societies. The fictional style of the individual stories being quite different, every one of them required close scrutiny and translation into appropriate literary German style. Striving to stay as close as possible to the oldest known Arabic text before any later European additions, the stories about Ali Baba, Aladdin and Sindbad were not included in Ott's editions. As modern literary scholarship had shown, these stories had only been added to the French edition of The Tales by Antoine Galland in his own and many later versions.

Commenting on the character of Shahrazad, Ott said:

Shahrazad, the narrator of the overarching tale, is depicted as a woman who knows exactly what she is doing and who faces a life-threatening situation with shrewd intelligence and careful consideration. The real significance of the frame tale lay thus in her act of disrupting the spiral of violence, achieved not through conventional feminine traits like charm, attractiveness, and beauty, but rather through knowledge, education, and the power of literature.

— Claudia Ott, Arabic scholar and translator

In 2012, Ott published the first ever translation of an even older manuscript, titled the One Hundred and One Nights. She had discovered a manuscript of this work, dated from 1234 or 1235, in the temporary exhibition "Treasures of the Agha Khan Museum" in the Museum of Islamic Art in Berlin. This manuscript includes not more than 85 nights, with only two tales shared with the much later Galland manuscript of The Nights, and was written during Muslim-rule in medieval al-Andalus.

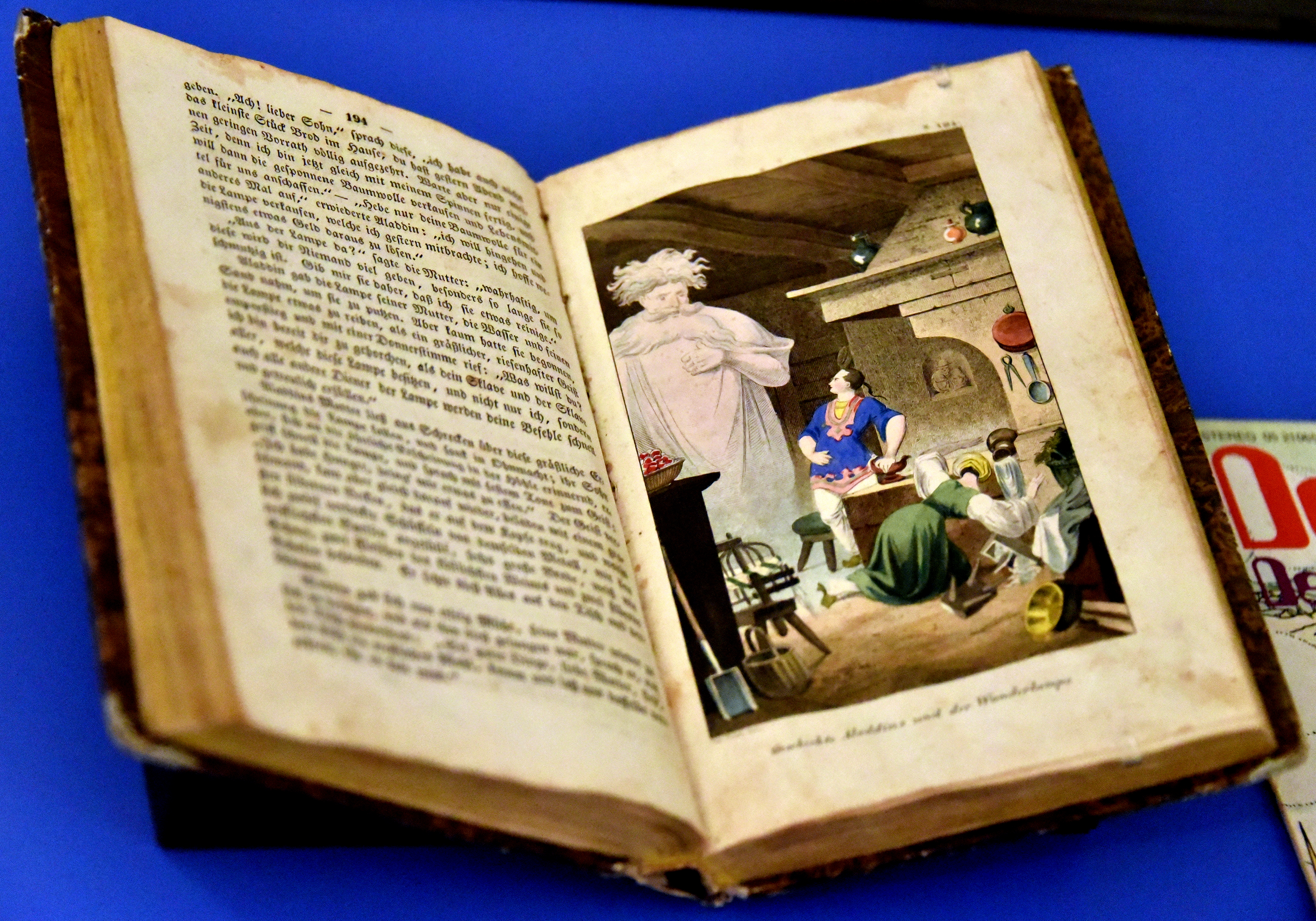
Scheherazade's Tales or One Thousand and One Nights, German translation by Karl Pfaff, 1838, with copperplate prints by Johann Voltz, Stuttgart

Following several reprints after her first translation of The Nights, Ott published more stories in separate volumes. The first of these were the tales of the nights 283 up to 542 that she had translated from a separate Arabic manuscript:The Kayseri Manuscript, the oldest one with the ending of the frame story. This sequel is titled Tausendundeine Nacht. Das glückliche Ende. (1001 Nights. The Happy Ending) and was published in 2016. In 2018, she published only the narrative frame of The Nights as Tausendundeine Nacht. Der Anfang und das glückliche Ende. This volume contains the beginning of the cycle with the story of Shahrazad and King Shahryar, followed by the "happy ending" in a single volume. The 2022 volume Tausendundeine Nacht – Das Buch der Liebe (1001 Nights – The Book of Love) contains four long love stories about King Kamarassaman and other characters of The Nights.

The title of Ott's 2008 anthology of Oriental love poems Gold auf Lapislazuli (Gold on Lapiz Lazuli) goes back to a poem from al-Andalus about the "twinkling of stars in a dark blue sky." This collection of 100 translated poems from seven different oriental languages presents works written in different historical periods and features important themes of this sub-genre.

In her public readings, Ott is usually accompanied by an Arabic musical group and reads the stories aloud, both in German and Arabic. By this, she presents her stories in the traditional way of Oriental storytelling. In printed editions, her translations have been illustrated with Arabic calligraphy.

== Reception ==
Based on her translations of the One Thousand and One Nights and other works of medieval Arabic literature, Ott has been called one of the "foremost translators from Arabic to German" and is considered an important mediator of Arabic culture in German-speaking countries.

Reviews of the translation of The Nights have been very positive, noting their contemporary language and appropriate literary style. Compared to earlier German translations, for example by Arabist Enno Littmann, who first published his version in the 1920s, reviewers welcomed Ott's choice to render erotic scenes in contemporary language rather than omitting such scenes on grounds of morality, as some earlier European and Arabic versions had done.

A review in the online magazine Qantara called Ott's style "freed from the imposed patina of the European fairytale idiom" and also remarked her translations of the original poems set between the tales. These poems had been omitted in earlier German versions, and Ott included them, using various poetic metres reflecting the original Arabic verses. A review of The Nights in the German weekly Der Spiegel compared her work to the restoration of a historical work, as she had removed the "layers" of earlier translations placed over the "magnificent painting and exposed the good, old original."

Following the first edition in 2004, Ott's Tausendundeine Nacht has been reprinted in hardcover several times, with additional paperback editions, audio books and online versions.

== Selected works and publications ==
=== Literary translations ===
- Tausendundeine Nacht. After the oldest Arabic manuscript in the edition of Muhsin Mahdi, translated into German for the first time by Claudia Ott. C.H.Beck, München 2018^{12} (2004^{1}), ISBN 978-3-406-72290-5.
- Gold auf Lapislazuli. Die 100 schönsten Liebesgedichte des Orients. C.H.Beck, München 2008, ISBN 978-3-406-57669-0.
- Hundertundeine Nacht. Aus dem Arabischen erstmals ins Deutsche übertragen und umfassend kommentiert von Claudia Ott. Nach der andalusischen Handschrift des Aga Khan Museum. Mit Faksimile-Abbildungen des Originals. Manesse Verlag, Zürich 2012, ISBN 978-3-7175-9026-2.
- Tausendundeine Nacht. Das glückliche Ende. Nach der Handschrift der Raşit-Efendi-Bibliothek Kayseri erstmals ins Deutsche übertragen von Claudia Ott. C.H.Beck, München 2016, ISBN 978-3-406-68826-3.
- Tausendundeine Nacht. Der Anfang und das glückliche Ende. C. H. Beck, München 2018, ISBN 978-3-406-71404-7.
- Tausendundeine Nacht – Das Buch der Liebe. C. H. Beck, München 2022, ISBN 978-3-406-79035-5.
- Alharthi, Jokha (2025). Herrinnen des Mondes. Zürich: Dörlemann. ISBN 978-3-03820-152-6.

=== Academic studies ===
- Metamorphosen des Epos. Sīrat al-Muǧāhidīn (Sīrat al-Amīra Dāt al-Himma) zwischen Mündlichkeit und Schriftlichkeit. Research School of Asian, African, and Amerindian Studies (=CNWS publications 119), Universiteit Leiden, Leiden 2003 (Dissertation), ISBN 90-5789-081-X.
- Ott, Claudia (2003). "From the Coffeehouse into the Manuscript: the Storyteller and his Audience in the Manuscripts of an Arabic Epic". Oriente Moderno. 83 (2): 443–451. doi:10.1163/22138617-08302012. ISSN 0030-5472.
- Enno Littmann und seine Übersetzung von 1001 Nacht. In: Karlheinz Wiegmann (ed.): Hin und weg. Tübingen in aller Welt, Kulturamt, Tübingen 2007 (Tübinger Kataloge, Band 77), pp. 111–123, ISBN 978-3-910090-77-4
- Ott, Claudia (2017). "Paradise, Alexander the Great and the Arabian Nights: Some New Insights Based on an Unpublished Manuscript". In Günther, Sebastian; Lawson, Todd (eds.). Roads to Paradise: Eschatology and Concepts of the Hereafter in Islam (2 vols.). Leiden: Brill. pp. 922–930. doi:10.1163/9789004333154_044. ISBN 978-90-04-33315-4.

== Awards and distinctions ==
- 2011 Johann-Friedrich-von-Cotta Award, Stuttgart
- 2013 Nomination for the translation award of the Leipzig Book Fair Prize for Hundertundeine Nacht
- 2019 Writer-in-Residence Chretzeturm, Stein am Rhein
- 2019 Award of the cultural foundation Erlangen for her translation of Tausendundeine Nacht
- 2024 Gerda Henkel Foundation's Tandem Fellowship

== See also ==
- List of One Thousand and One Nights characters
- List of stories within One Thousand and One Nights
- Arabic literature
- Hanna Diyab
