= Felicitas Hoppe =

German writer (born 1960)

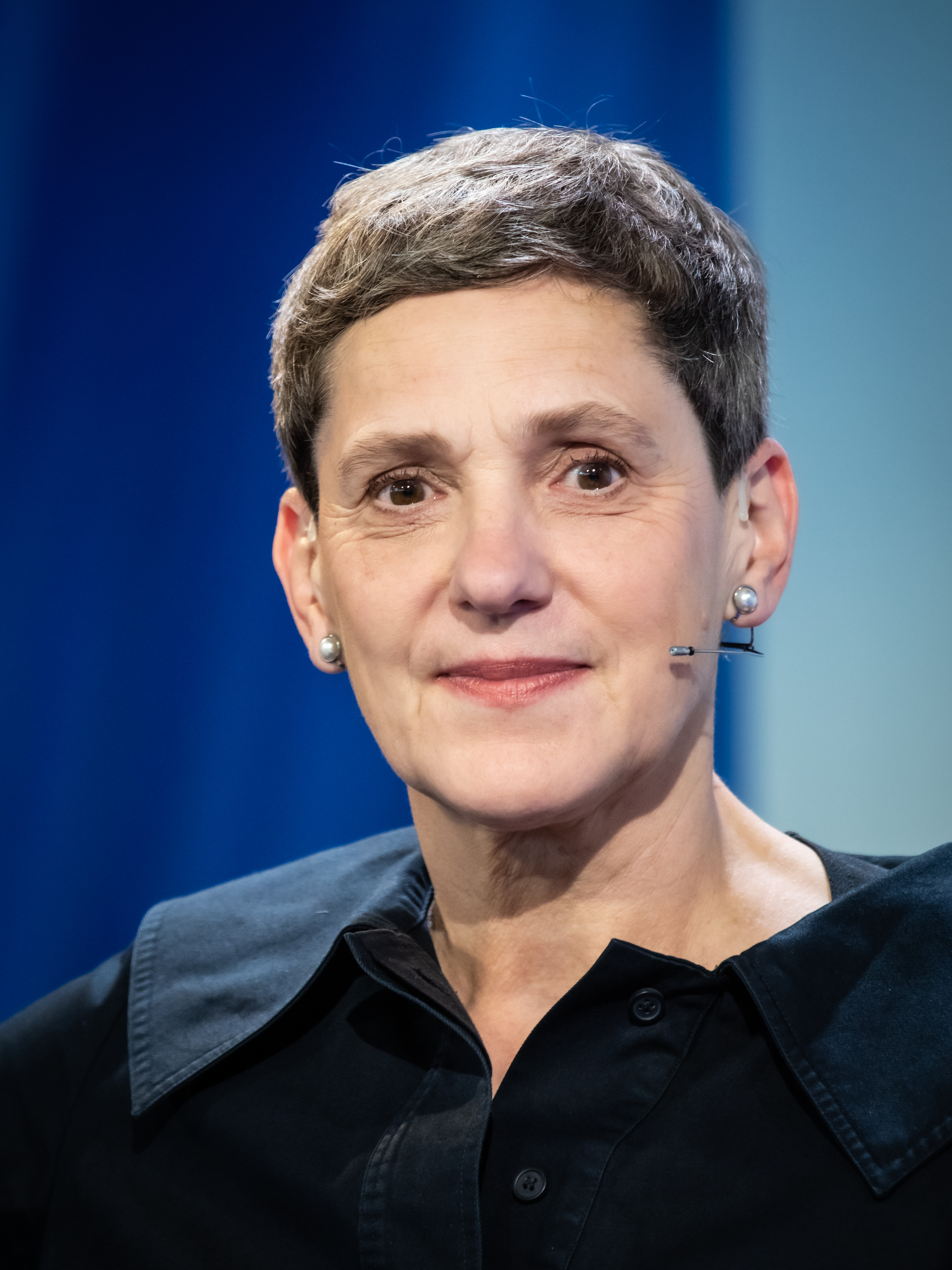
- Felicitas Hoppe 2019
- Born: 22 December 1960 (age 65); Hamelin, Lower Saxony, West Germany
- Occupation: Writer
- Writing career
- Period: late 20th – early 21st century
- Genre: Narrative

Felicitas Hoppe (born 22 December 1960) is a German writer. She received the Georg Büchner Prize in 2012.

== Biography ==
=== Early years ===
Felicitas Hoppe was born in Hamelin, Lower Saxony, and grew up there. After her Abitur she studied literature, rhetorics and theology: from 1982 to 1984 at the Eberhard Karls Universität in Tübingen, from 1984 to 1986 at the University of Oregon and from 1987 to 1990 at the Freien Universität Berlin. In 2006 she was a visiting scholar at Dartmouth College. She worked as a dramaturge and journalist. Since 1996 she has been a freelance writer living in Berlin.

=== Career ===
Her work often deals with transitory themes, as in "Picknick der Friseure", in a comical, but nevertheless thrilling way, which make her stories seem to be absurd. She also uses the technique of quotation for her novels, as in "Johanna", where she reconstructs the story of Joan of Arc using official case records. As a relatively young, successful and female writer, she belongs to a group of writers which literary criticism calls the "Fräuleinwunder". She also writes children's books.

For her work as a writer she received the following awards: in 1994 Alfred-Döblin-Stipendium (a scholarship), in 1996 Aspekte-Literaturpreis and the Ernst-Willner-Preis at the Festival of German-Language Literature in Klagenfurt, in 1997 the Rauris Literature Prize, in 2004 the Nicolas Born Prize, the Heimito von Doderer-Literaturpreis and the Spycher: Literaturpreis Leuk, in 2005 the Brothers Grimm Prize of the City of Hanau. In 2005 she also held the Poetikdozentur: junge Autoren der Fachhochschule Wiesbaden. In 2007 she received Literaturpreis der Stadt Bremen and the Roswitha-Preis. In 2008 Hoppe held the Bert Brecht Gastprofessur at the University of Augsburg.

In 2012, Hoppe was awarded the most prestigious literary prize in German literature, the Georg Büchner Prize. In 2020, she was awarded the first Großer Preis des Deutschen Literaturfonds.

== Works ==
- Unglückselige Begebenheiten, Eppelheim 1991 ISBN 978-3-928459-00-6
- Picknick der Friseure, Rowohlt Verlag, Reinbek bei Hamburg 1996 ISBN 978-3-498-02928-9
- Das Richtfest, Berlin 1997
- Drei Kapitäne, Berlin 1998
- Pigafetta, Reinbek bei Hamburg 1999 ISBN 978-3-499-22761-5
- Vom Bäcker und seiner Frau, Berlin 1999
- Die Torte, Berlin 2000
- Fakire und Flötisten, Berlin 2001
- Paradiese, Übersee, Reinbek bei Hamburg 2003, Fischer Verlag, Frankfurt am Main 2006 ISBN 978-3-596-17127-9
- Die Reise nach Java, Berlin 2003
- Verbrecher und Versager, Hamburg 2004 ISBN 978-3-936384-12-3
- Ausgerutscht, Mathegeschichte
- Johanna, Fischer Verlag, Frankfurt am Main 2006 ISBN 978-3-596-16743-2
- Iwein Löwenritter, Frankfurt am Main 2008 ISBN 978-3-596-85259-8
- Sieben Schätze. Augsburger Vorlesungen, Frankfurt am Main 2009 ISBN 978-3-10-032455-9
- Der beste Platz der Welt, Dörlemann Verlag, Zürich 2009 ISBN 978-3-908777-51-9
- Abenteuer – was ist das?, Wallstein Verlag, Göttingen 2010, ISBN 978-3-8353-0739-1
- Hoppe, Fischer Verlag, Frankfurt am Main 2012, ISBN 978-3-10-032451-1
- Kröne dich selbst – sonst krönt dich keiner., Universitätsverlag Winter, Heidelberg 2018, ISBN 978-3-8253-6755-8
- Prawda. Eine amerikanische Reise. Fischer Verlag, Frankfurt am Main 2018, ISBN 978-3-10-032457-3
- The Making of Prawda., Distanz Verlag, Berlin 2019, ISBN 978-3-95476-282-8
- Grimms Märchen für Heldinnen von heute und morgen., Editor: Felicitas Hoppe, Reclam, Ditzingen 2019, ISBN 978-3-15011213-7
