= One Hundred and One Nights (book) =

Cycle of Arabic stories

One Hundred and One Nights (Arabic: كتاب فيه حديث مائة ليلة وليلة, romanized: Kitâb Fîhi Hadîth Mi'a Layla wa-Layla) is a book of Arabic literature consisting of twenty stories, which presents many similarities to the more famous One Thousand and One Nights.

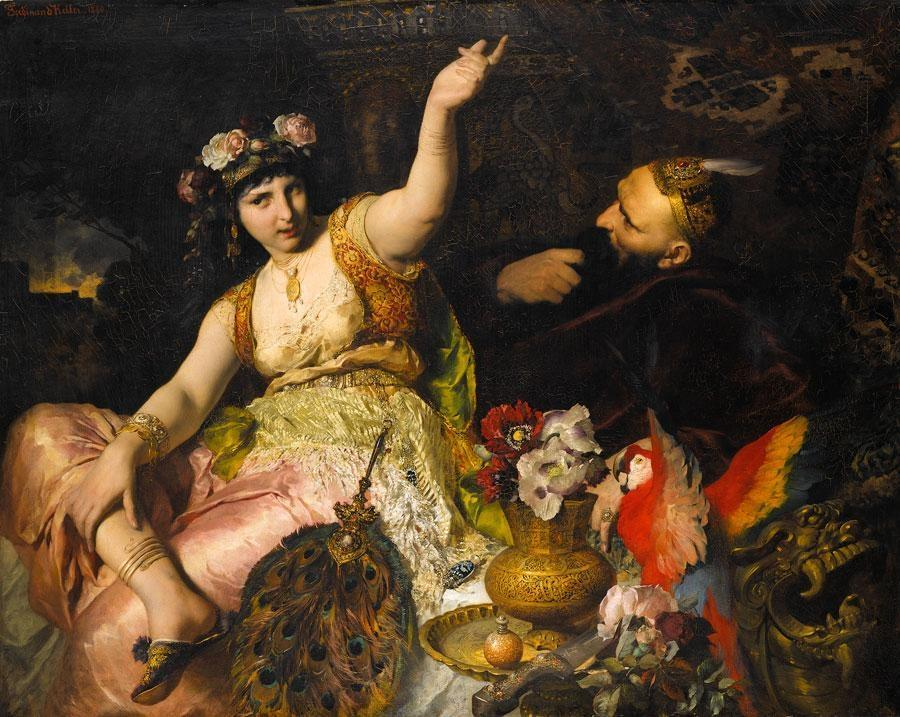
Scheherazade and Shahryar by Ferdinand Keller, 1880

The origin of the work is a mystery. Although some suggest the possibility that the stories have their origin in Persia or India, they come from the Maghreb (Northwestern Africa), which in turn, according to other authors, were originated in al-Andalus (Islamic Iberia).

In 2010, the Orientalist Claudia Ott discovered the oldest known manuscript of the text, dated from 1234 or '35, which includes 85 nights.

== Comparison with One Thousand and One Nights ==
With the exception of the frame story of Scheherazade and the tales of "The Ebony Horse" and the "Seven Viziers", which are present in both One Thousand and One Nights and One Hundred and One Nights, the stories are different in the two works. However, their themes and narrative structure are very similar. Both have as their setting the immense Muslim world, and both sets of stories tell about intrepid travelers, epic and romantic adventures, and enigmas, desires, and wonders. Scholars consider that the two story collections complement one other, and reading both allows a more complete appreciation of medieval Arabian folk literature.

One Thousand and One Nights takes place primarily in the Eastern Arab world, while One Hundred and One Nights takes place in the Western Arab world. Umayyad caliphs are repeatedly referenced throughout the collection. In fact, caliph Abd al-Malik ibn Marwan and his three sons enjoy a similar status in the One Hundred and One Nights to that of the Abbasid caliph Harun al-Rashid in the One Thousand and One Nights. According to Claudia Ott, this is due to the historical role played by the Umayyads on the history of Andalusia, and the Emirate of Córdoba being considered the successor dynasty of the fallen caliphate of the Umayyads in Damascus.

Of the two, One Hundred and One Nights is thought to be older although both of the texts have complicated histories and it is difficult to say for certain.

== Translations ==
Bruce Fudge's translation of the work into English

The book first emerged in the West in 1911, when the French Arabist Maurice Gaudefroy-Demombynes (1862–1957) published a French translation of four Maghrebi manuscripts.

A translation of Ott's older manuscript into German was published in 2012. The manuscript itself, as well as an English translation by Bruce Fudge, was published by the Library of Arabic Literature in 2016.

== List of stories ==
The following list of stories is from the Fudge's English translation (2016):

- The Story of a Hundred and One Nights (Frame story)
  - The Story of the Young Merchant
  - The Story of Najm al-Ḍiyāʾ ibn Mudīr al-Mulk
  - The Story of Camphor Island
  - The Story of Ẓāfir ibn Lāḥiq
  - The Story of the Vizier and his Son
  - The Story of King Sulaymān ibn ʿAbd al-Malik
  - The Story of Maslamah ibn ʿAbd al-Malik ibn Marwān
  - The Story of Gharībat al-Ḥusn and the Young Egyptian
  - The Story of the Young Egyptian and his Wife
  - The Story of the King and his Three Sons
  - The Story of the Young Man and the Necklaces
  - The Story of the Four Companions
  - The Story of the Prince and the Seven Viziers
    - An Elephant’s Education
    - Lion Tracks
    - The Husband and the Parrot
    - The Fuller and his Son
    - The Loaves of Bread
    - The Lady and Her Two Lovers
    - The Prince and the Ogress
    - The Drop of Honey
    - The Woman Who Made Her Husband Sift Dirt
    - The Enchanted Spring
    - The Prince and the Bath-Keeper’s Wife
    - The Tears of a Dog
    - The Boar and the Monkey
    - The Dog and the Viper
    - The Wiles of the Old Woman
    - The Lion and the Thief
    - The King and the Fisherman
    - The Elephant
    - The Three Wishes
    - The Man Who Investigated the Wiles of Women
  - The Story of the King and the Serpent
  - The Tale of the Ebony Horse
  - The Story of the King and the Gazelle
  - The Story of the Vizier Ibn Abī l-Qamar and ʿAbd al-Malik ibn Marwān
