= Mirko Bonné =

German writer and translator

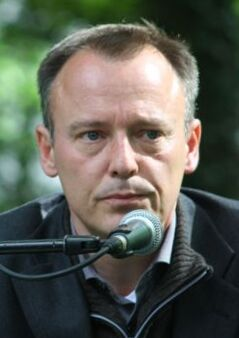
Bonné, 2013

Mirko Bonné (born 9 June 1965) is a German writer and translator.

Bonné was born in Tegernsee, Bavaria. In 1975 his family moved to Hamburg, where he attended the Hansa Gymnasium. He graduated from the Otto Hahn Gymnasium in Geesthacht in 1986 and worked as a bookshop assistant, taxi driver and nurse. His writing career began in the early 1990s with journalism, moving on to lyric poetry and translations.

In his poetry, influenced by Keats, Trakl and Eich, he treats the themes of landscape, life, and memory, while his prose, which includes novels about Shackleton and Camus, concerns itself with the mechanisms of oppression. He has published travel writing about South America, Russia, China, the United States, Iran, and Antarctica, and translated Anderson, Dickinson, Keats, Cummings, Creeley, Yeats, and Gherasim Luca. He was a member of PEN Germany and lives in Hamburg.

== Original works ==
- Roberta von Ampel. Radio play, Radio Bremen 1992
- Langrenus. Gedichte. Rospo, Hamburg 1994, ISBN 978-3-930325-02-3.
- Gelenkiges Geschöpf. Poems. Rospo, Hamburg 1996, ISBN 978-3-930325-13-9.
- Der junge Fordt. Novel. DuMont, Köln 1999, ISBN 978-3-7701-4960-5.
- Ein langsamer Sturz. Novel. DuMont, Köln 2002, ISBN 978-3-8321-6000-5.
- Hibiskus Code. Poems. DuMont, Köln 2003, ISBN 978-3-8321-6001-2.
- Der eiskalte Himmel. Novel. Schöffling, Frankfurt am Main 2006, ISBN 978-3-89561-401-9.
- Die Republik der Silberfische. Poems. Schöffling, Frankfurt am Main 2008, ISBN 978-3-89561-402-6.
- Wie wir verschwinden. Novel. Schöffling, Frankfurt am Main 2009, ISBN 978-3-89561-403-3.
- Ausflug mit dem Zerberus. Schöffling, Frankfurt am Main 2010, ISBN 978-3-89561-404-0.
- Der Eichelhäher. Short story. Literatur-Quickie, Hamburg 2010, ISBN 978-3-942212-16-8.

== Translations ==
- John Keats: Werke und Briefe. Phillip Reclam jun., Stuttgart 1995.
- E. E. Cummings: 39 Alphabetisch. Gedichte. Urs Engeler Editor, Weil am Rhein 2001.
- Terry McDonagh: Kiltimagh. Ausgewählte Gedichte. Blaupause Books, Hamburg 2001.
- Ghérasim Luca: Das Körperecho. Gedichte. Urs Engeler Editor, Weil am Rhein 2004.
- William Butler Yeats: Die Gedichte (mit M. Beyer, G. Falkner, N. Hummelt (Hrsg.), C. Schuenke). Luchterhand, München 2005.
- Samuel Beckett: Six Poèmes / Sechs Gedichte. Wolfenbütteler Übersetzergespräche, Wolfenbüttel 2006.
- Robert Creeley: Alles, was es für immer bedeutet. Gedichte. Jung und Jung, Salzburg und Wien 2006.
- Rutger Kopland: Dank sei den Dingen. Ausgewählte Gedichte 1966 – 2006 (mit Hendrik Rost), Carl Hanser, München 2008.
- Emma Lew: Nesselgesang. Gedichte. Yedermann, München 2008.
- Sherwood Anderson: Winesburg, Ohio. Schöffling & Co., Frankfurt am Main 2012, ISBN 978-3-89561-232-9.

== Essays in literary journals ==
- Dunkle Deutung des Vogelflugs. Essay. Bella triste No. 24, 2009.
- Das verwundete Herz. Essay. Quart Heft für Kultur Tirol No. 18, 2011.

== Prizes ==
- 2001 Wolfgang-Weyrauch-Förderpreis for the "Literarischer März" competition
- 2002 Ernst-Willner-Preis at Klagenfurt
- 2004 Berliner Kunstpreis Förderpreis
- 2007 Deutscher Literaturfonds award
- 2008 Prix Relay du Roman d'Evasion
- 2008 Ernst-Meister-Preis für Lyrik Förderpreis
- 2010 Marie-Luise-Kaschnitz-Preis
- 2010 Writer in Residence Rio de Janeiro
- 2012 Writer in Residence Shanghai
- 2014 Rainer-Malkowski-Preis
- 2024 Hubert-Fichte-Preis
- 2025 Hannelore Greve Literature Prize
