= Christoph Peters =

German writer

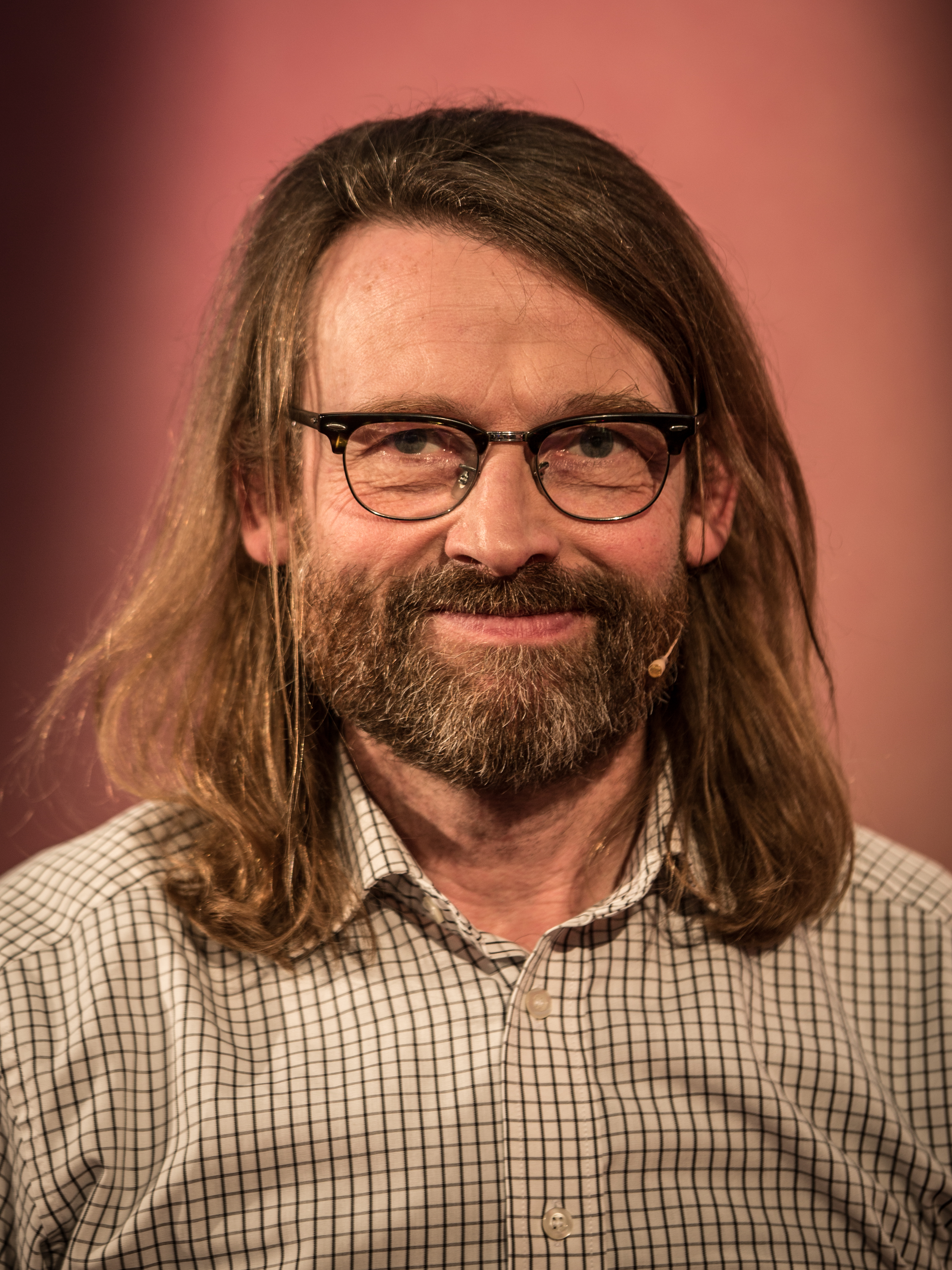
Christoph Peters (2017)

Christoph Peters (born 11 October 1966 in Kalkar) is a German author of novels and short stories. His debut novel, Stadt Land Fluss was published in 1999, and won the Aspekte-Literaturpreis for the best German literary debut. It was followed by a collection of short stories in 2001, and, in 2007, his first novel to be published in English, The Fabric of Night (Random House). Peters lives in Berlin. He received the Rheingau Literatur Preis in 2009 and the Friedrich-Hölderlin-Preis in 2016. In 2025 he was awarded the Schubart-Literaturpreis for his novel Innerstädtischer Tod.

== Works ==
=== Novels ===
- Peters, Christoph (1999). Stadt, Land, Fluß Roman (in German). Frankfurt am Main: Frankfurter Verl.-Anstalt. ISBN 978-3-627-00066-0. OCLC 237351917.
- —— (2009). Mitsukos Restaurant : Roman. München: Luchterhand. ISBN 978-3-630-87273-5. OCLC 301547191.
- —— (2003). Das Tuch aus Nacht : Roman (in German). München: Btb. ISBN 3-442-75090-3. OCLC 52944284.
- —— (2012). Wir in Kahlenbeck : Roman (in German). München: Luchterhand. ISBN 978-3-630-87321-3. OCLC 809030361.
- —— (2022). Der Sandkasten Roman (in German). München: Luchterhand Literaturverlag GmbH. ISBN 978-3-630-87477-7. OCLC 1309072620.

=== Short stories ===
- Peters, Christoph (2001). Kommen und gehen, manchmal bleiben : 14 Geschichten (in German). Frankfurt am Main: Frankfurter Verlagsanstalt. ISBN 3-627-00085-4. OCLC 49750574.

=== English translations ===
- Peters, Christoph; Cullen, John (2008). The fabric of night. New York: Anchor Books. ISBN 978-1-4000-7947-6. OCLC 176918550.
