= Hanns-Josef Ortheil =

German author (born 1951)

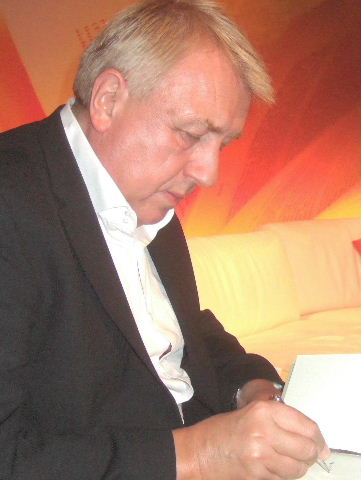
Hanns-Josef Ortheil in 2009

Hanns-Josef Ortheil (born 5 November 1951, in Cologne) is a German author, scholar of German literature, and pianist. He has written many autobiographical and historical novels, some of which have been translated into 11 languages, according to WorldCat: French, Dutch, Modern Greek, Spanish, Chinese, Lithuanian, Japanese, Slovenian, and Russian.

== Biography ==
He was born the fifth son in an educated family; his mother, Mary Catherine Ortheil, was a librarian and his father a railroad surveyor and director. As a child, he did not speak, because his mother had temporarily lost her speech, following the loss of four sons during the Second World War. When Ortheil learned to play the piano, this was for him the first time he could express himself and communicate with the world around him. He at first wanted to be a pianist, and studied for a period at the Rome Conservatory.

In Germany he attended the Mainz Rabanus-Maurus-Gymnasium, and then the Universities of Mainz, Göttingen, Paris and Rome. His subjects were musicology, philosophy, Germanic, and comparative literature. During this time, he worked as a film and music journalist for the Mainz Allgemeine Zeitung. In 1976 he wrote his doctoral dissertation on the theory of the novel in the era of the French Revolution at the German Institute of the University of Mainz.

== Career ==
Among his published works is a travel narrative (Die Moselreise) he had already written as a boy of eleven, when his father took him on a tour of the Moselle. Ortheil was a feature writer and literary critic for the Frankfurter Allgemeine Zeitung, TIME, The World, Der Spiegel and the Neue Zürcher Zeitung. He is professor for creative writing and cultural journalism at the University of Hildesheim. In 2006 he was appointed as honorary professor at the University of Heidelberg. Since 2009, he is director of the newly established Institute for Literary Writing and Literary Studies at the Hildesheim Foundation University.

== Publications ==
=== Non-fiction ===
- Wilhelm Klemm – Ein Lyriker der "Menschheitsdämmerung", Stuttgart 1979
- Der poetische Widerstand im Roman, Königstein/Taunus 1980
- Mozart im Innern seiner Sprachen, Frankfurt/Main 1982
- Jean Paul, Reinbek bei Hamburg 1984
- Köder, Beute und Schatten. Suchbewegungen, Essays. Frankfurt/Main 1985
- Schauprozesse. Beiträge zur Kultur der 80er Jahre, Essays, München 1990
- Das Glück der Musik – Vom Vergnügen Mozart zu hören, München 2006
- Wie Romane entstehen, München 2008, with Klaus Siblewski
- Lesehunger. Ein Bücher-Menu in 12 Gängen, München 2009
- Was ich liebe – und was nicht, München 2016

=== Fiction and historical fiction ===
- Schwerenöter, München 1987
- Faustinas Küsse, München 1998
- Im Licht der Lagune, München 1999
- Die Nacht des Don Juan, München 2000
- Die Erfindung des Lebens, München 2009

== Awards ==
- 1979 Aspekte-Literaturpreis
- 1981 Förderpreis des Landes Nordrhein-Westfalen für Literatur
- 1982 Sonderpreis der Lektoren beim Ingeborg-Bachmann-Wettbewerb
- 1988 Literaturpreis der Stadt Stuttgart
- 1991 Villa Massimo Stipendium
- 2000 Brandenburgischer Literaturpreis
- 2000/2001 Mainzer Stadtschreiber
- 2001 Verdienstmedaille des Landes Baden-Württemberg
- 2002 Thomas Mann Prize of the City of Lübeck
- 2004 Georg-K.-Glaser-Preis
- 2005 Honorary literary citizen of the city of Venice
- 2006 Koblenzer Literaturpreis
- 2007 Nicolas Born Prize
- 2009 Elisabeth-Langgässer-Literaturpreis
- 2016 Hannelore Greve Literature Prize

=== Lectureships in poetics ===
- WS 1993/1994 Lectureship in poetics at the University of Paderborn
- WS 1994/1995 Lectureship in poetics at Bielefeld University
- WS 1998/1999 Poetics lectureship at the University of Heidelberg
- WS 2005/2006 Poetics lectureship at the University of Zürich
- SS 2007 Professorship in poetry at the University of Bamberg
