= Fritz Vogelgsang =

German translator, essayist and editor (1930-2009)

Fritz Vogelgsang (1 March 1930 in Stuttgart – 22 October 2009 in Chiva de Morella) was a German translator, essayist and editor.

He translated into German the work of various important Spanish-language writers: Rafael Alberti, Ramón del Valle Inclán, Antonio Machado, Octavio Paz, Pablo Neruda, Juan Ramón Jiménez, Miguel Ángel Asturias, etc.

== Honors ==
- Literaturpreis der Stadt Stuttgart (1978)
- Christoph-Martin-Wieland-Übersetzerpreis (1979)
- Premio Nacional de Formento de la Traducción de Autores Espanoles (1984)
- Premi de Literatura Catalana (1985)
- Johann-Heinrich-Voß-Preis für Übersetzung (1991)
- Wilhelm-Merton-Preis für europäische Übersetzungen (2001)
- Preis der Leipziger Buchmesse (2008)
