= The Pollen Room =

Book by Zoë Jenny

The Pollen Room (German: Das Blütenstaubzimmer) is the debut novel by Swiss author Zoë Jenny. Published in 1997, the book was a literary and commercial success in Switzerland and across Europe.

The novel was published in Germany by Frankfurter Verlagsanstalt, with an advance of less than 10,000 marks. After publication, the novel reached #2 on Switzerland's best sellers list and won several literary prizes in Austria and Germany.

The Pollen Room contains some autobiographical elements. In the novel, Jo's parents separate when she is a child, and she lives with her father (a publisher) until she decides to search for her mother.
