= Monika Helfer =

Austrian writer (1947–2026)

Helfer in 1974

Monika Helfer (18 October 1947 – 2 August 2026) was an Austrian writer.

== Life and career ==
Monika Helfer was born in Au on 18 October 1947. She was invested with the Austrian Decoration for Science and Art in 2016. She was the recipient of the Solothurner Literaturpreis in 2020, and the Schubart-Literaturpreis in 2021. She was nominated twice for the German Book Prize in 2017 and 2021.

Helfer died on 2 August 2026, at the age of 78, as the result of a fall.
