= Hannelore Greve Literature Prize =

German literary award

Hannelore Greve Literature Prize German: Hannelore-Greve-Literaturpreis
- Country: Germany
- Hosted by: Hamburg Authors' Association
- Reward: €25,000
- First award: 2004
- Website: hh-av.de (in German)

The Hannelore Greve Literature Prize honors outstanding achievements in the field of German-language literature. The Hamburg Authors' Association has been awarding the Hannelore Greve Literature Prize every two years since 2004, alternating annually with the Walter Kempowski Literature Prize. The award, endowed with 25,000 euros, was donated by Hamburg's honorary citizens Hannelore and Helmut Greve.

== Recipients ==
- 2004: Siegfried Lenz
- 2006: Hans Pleschinski
- 2008: Arno Surminski
- 2010: Eva Gesine Baur aka Lea Singer
- 2012: Gerhard Henschel
- 2014: Herta Müller
- 2016: Hanns-Josef Ortheil
- 2018: Ulla Hahn
- 2020: Klaus Modick
- 2023: Juli Zeh
- 2025: Mirko Bonné
