= Aspekte-Literaturpreis =

German literary award

The Aspekte-Literaturpreis (Aspekte Literature Prize) is awarded annually for the best debut novel written in German, as judged by a panel of writers, critics, and scholars. The prize is sponsored by the ZDF television network through its arts program, Aspekte. It is valued at 10,000 Euros. Past recipients include Georg Büchner Prize-winner Felicitas Hoppe and Nobel Prize-winner Herta Müller. The award was established in 1979.

== Winners ==
- 1979 Hanns-Josef Ortheil for Fermer
- 1980 Michael Schneider for Das Spiegelkabinett
- 1981 Thomas Hürlimann for Die Tessinerin
- 1982 Inge Merkel for Das andere Gesicht
- 1983 Zsuzsanna Gahse for Zero
- 1983 Beat Sterchi for Blösch
- 1984 Herta Müller for Niederungen
- 1985 Jochen Beyse for Der Aufklärungsmacher
- 1986 Barbara Honigmann for Roman von einem Kinde
- 1987 Erich Hackl for Auroras Anlaß
- 1988 Christa Moog for Aus tausend grünen Spiegeln
- 1989 Irina Liebmann for Mitten im Krieg
- 1990 Ulrich Woelk for Freigang
- 1991 Burkhard Spinnen for Dicker Mann im Meer
- 1992 Dagmar Leupold for Edmond
- 1993 Manfred Rumpl for Koordinaten der Liebe
- 1994 Radek Knapp for Franio
- 1995 Ingo Schulze for 33 Augenblicke des Glücks
- 1996 Felicitas Hoppe for Picknick der Friseure
- 1997 Zoë Jenny for Das Blütenstaubzimmer
- 1998 John von Düffel for Vom Wasser
- 1999 Christoph Peters for Stadt Land Fluß
- 2000 Andreas Maier for Wäldchestag
- 2001 Sherko Fatah for Im Grenzland
- 2002 Zsuzsa Bánk for Der Schwimmer
- 2003 Roswitha Haring for Ein Bett aus Schnee
- 2004 Thomas Stangl for Der einzige Ort
- 2005 Jens Petersen for Die Haushälterin
- 2006 Paul Ingendaay for Warum Du mich verlassen hast
- 2007 Thomas von Steinaecker for Wallner beginnt zu fliegen
- 2008 María Cecilia Barbetta for Änderungsschneiderei Los Milagros
- 2009 Stephan Thome for Grenzgang
- 2010 Dorothee Elmiger for Einladung an die Waghalsigen
- 2011 Eugen Ruge for In Times of Fading Light
- 2012 Teresa Präauer for Für den Herrscher aus Übersee
- 2013 Eberhard Rathgeb for Kein Paar wie wir
- 2014 Katja Petrowskaja for Vielleicht Esther
- 2015 Kat Kaufmann for Superposition
- 2016 Philipp Winkler for Hool
- 2017 Juliana Kálnay for Eine kurze Chronik des allmählichen Verschwindens
- 2018 Bettina Wilpert for nichts, was uns passiert
- 2019 Miku Sophie Kühmel for Kintsugi
- 2020 Deniz Ohde for Streulicht
- 2021 Ariane Koch for Die Aufdrängung
- 2022 Sven Pfizenmaier for Draußen feiern die Leute
- 2023 Charlotte Gneuß for Gittersee
- 2024 Julja Linhof for Krummes Holz
- 2025 Ozan Zakariya Keskinkılıç for Hundesohn
