= Katja Petrowskaja =

German writer and journalist

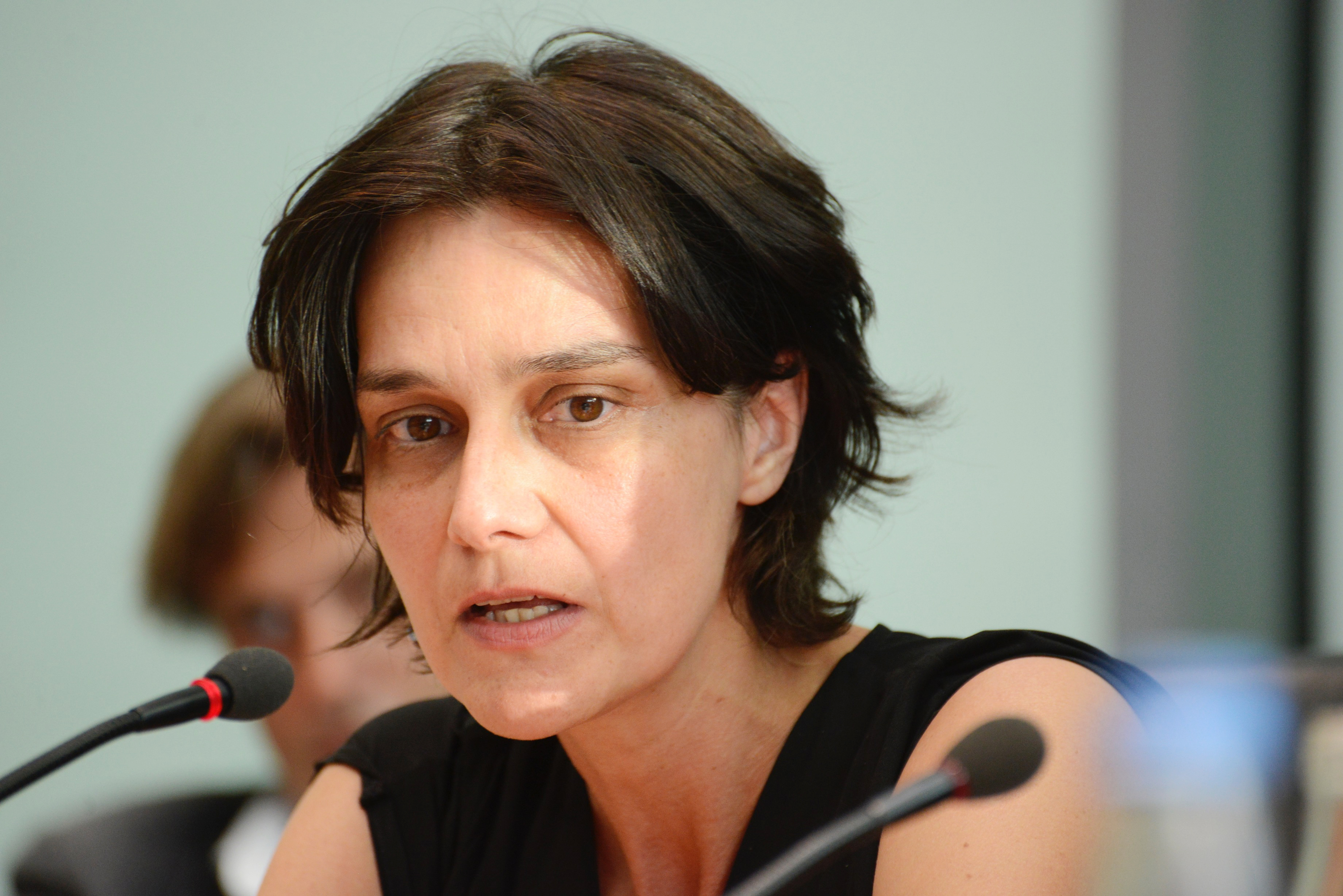
- Born: 3 February 1970 (age 56); Kyiv, Ukrainian SSR
- Occupations: novelist, journalist
- Writing career
- Genre: German literature
- Notable work: Maybe Esther (2014)

Katja Petrowskaja (Russian: Екатерина Мироновна Петровская, Ukrainian: Катерина Миронівна Петровська; born 3 February 1970) is a Ukrainian-born German prose writer and journalist.

== Biography ==
She grew up as Kateryna in Kyiv and, after the Chernobyl disaster, in Moscow as the younger daughter of professor of literature Miron Petrovsky and the teacher Svetlana. Her brother is the historian Yohanan Petrovsky-Shtern.

She studied literature and Slavic studies at the University of Tartu, where she was particularly influenced by the semiotician Juri Lotman. In 1994–1995 she studied with a scholarship offered by the American Council of Teachers of Russian (ACTR) at Stanford University and Columbia University. In 1998 she defended her dissertation The poetical prose of Vladislav Khodasevich at the Russian State University for the Humanities in Moscow. In 1999 she moved to Germany where she lives with her husband and two daughters in Berlin.

== Literary work ==
After writing for Russian newspapers, she started to publish in the German language newspapers Neue Zürcher Zeitung, and Frankfurter Allgemeine Zeitung. In 2010 she received a Robert Bosch fellowship for work towards publishing them as a book, with the working title Maybe Esther. In 2013 she received the Ingeborg-Bachmann-Preis for excerpts of chapter 5 of the book. Maybe Esther, finally published in 2014, tells the story of the genocide of the Jewish population of Kyiv, culminating in the massacre of Babi Yar on 29–30 September, through the account by Esther, who resembles her great-grandmother Esther, killed during the massacre. The book has been translated into more than 20 languages. Petrowskaja's major works are:

- Die Auserwählten. Ein Sommer im Ferienlager in Orlionok. Bildreportage von Anita Back mit einem Essay von Katja Petrowskaja und einem Vorwort von Joachim Jäger. Braus, Berlin, 2012.
- Vielleicht Esther. Suhrkamp, Berlin, 2014.
  - Maybe Esther: A Family Story. Translated from the German by Shelley Frisch. Harper, New York, 2018.

== Awards ==
- Ingeborg-Bachmann-Preis at the Festival of German-Language Literature (2014)
- Aspekte-Literaturpreis (2014)
