= Charles Simmons (author, born 1924) =

American writer

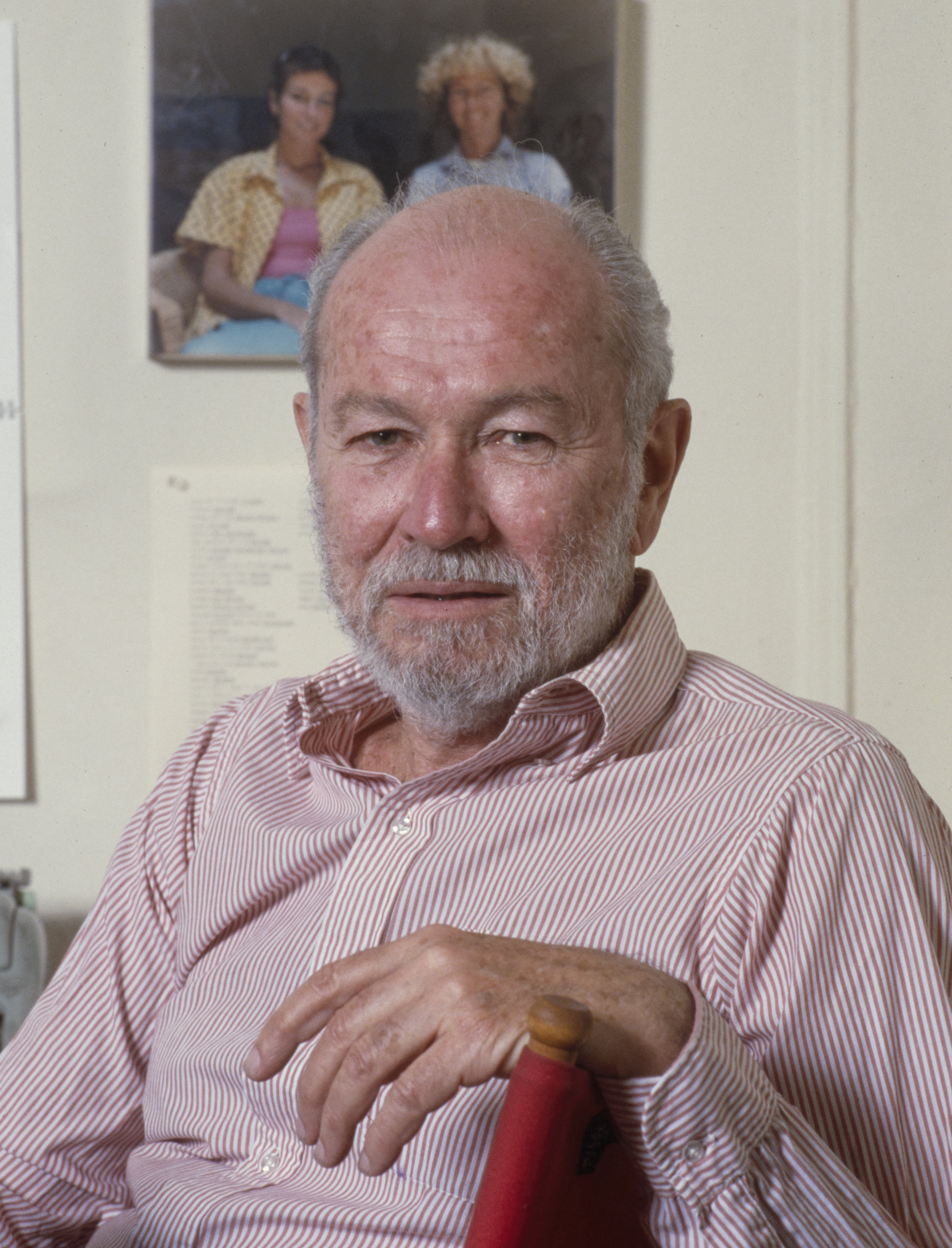
Simmons in 1987

Charles Paul Simmons (August 17, 1924 – June 1, 2017) was an American editor and novelist. His first novel, Powdered Eggs (1964), was awarded the William Faulkner Foundation Award (1965) for a notable first novel. Later works include Salt Water (1998), (Note: A retelling of Turgenev's First Love, The New York Times called Salt Water "a small masterpiece".) The Belles Lettres Papers, and Wrinkles and co-author together with Alexander Coleman of All There is to Know: Readings From the Illustrious Eleventh Edition of the Encyclopaedia Britannica.

He was formerly an editor of The New York Times Book Review. Simmons graduated from Regis High School and then Columbia University in 1948.

The Belles Lettres Papers satirized the world of book review publications; the Chicago Tribune said that, in it, Simmons "mounted .50-caliber machine guns on his wings and strafed his former colleagues at the New York Times Book Review". One plot point alluded to a 1985 news story surrounding a newly discovered sonnet that some claimed was written by Shakespeare.

== Selected works ==
- Simmons, Charles (1973). Powdered Eggs. Penguin Books. ISBN 0140032010, 9780140032017
- Simmons, Charles (1978). Wrinkles. Farrar, Straus & Giroux. ISBN 0374293333, 9780374293338
- Simmons, Charles (1987). The Belles Lettres Papers. William Morrow. ISBN 0688060498, 9780688060497
- Simmons, Charles (1988). An Old-fashioned Darling. Penguin Books. ISBN 0140111867, 9780140111866
- Coleman, Alexander (Editor); Simmons, Charles (Editor). (1994). All There Is to Know: Readings From the Illustrious Eleventh Edition of the Encyclopaedia Britannica. Simon & Schuster. ISBN 067176747X, 9780671767471
- Simmons, Charles (1999). Salt Water. Gallery Books. ISBN 0671035673, 9780671035679
