= Zschokke =

Zschokke is a Swiss-German surname. Notable people with the surname include:

- Friedrich Zschokke (1860–1936), Swiss zoologist and parasitologist
- Heinrich Zschokke (1771–1848), German/Swiss author, historian, and social reformer
- Matthias Zschokke (born 1954), Swiss writer and filmmaker
