= Italo-Svevo-Preis =

German literary prize

The Italo-Svevo-Preis is a German literary prize which has been awarded to outstanding German-language authors since 2001. The prize, named after Italo Svevo, is endowed with 15,000 euros and is made possible by the Hamburg issuing house Nordcapital. Until 2007 it was awarded by Blue Capital and until 2004 in cooperation with the Freie Akademie der Künste zu Leipzig. Until 2011, a juror appointed by the board of trustees alone decided who would be honoured with the prize. Since 2013, a three-member jury with a changing composition has awarded the prize.

The Italo Svevo Prize honours "literary varieties of aesthetic obstinacy", according to the prize donor. The prize promotes and honours the work of a German-language author, which has become visible in at least three independent publications and which, in the opinion of the juror, still lacks due public recognition and broad attention. The award is given for achievements in the field of prose: novel, essay, literary reportage or experimental forms of storytelling.

Since 2005, the award ceremony has taken place in the Literaturhaus Hamburg.

== Award winners ==
- 2001: Kathrin Röggla
- 2002: Alois Hotschnig
- 2003: Hartmut Lange
- 2004: Eckhard Henscheid
- 2005: Jürg Laederach
- 2006: Rosa Pock
- 2007: Gerd Fuchs
- 2008: Marie-Luise Scherer
- 2009: Annette Pehnt
- 2011: Volker H. Altwasser
- 2013: Giwi Margwelaschwili
- 2014: Jochen Missfeldt.
- 2015: Nina Jäckle
- 2016: Sabine Peters
- 2017: Zsuzsanna Gahse
- 2018: Jan Faktor
- 2019: Patricia Görg

== See also ==
- List of literary awards
