= Jäckle =

Surname

Jäckle is a surname. Notable people with the surname include:

- Nina Jäckle (born 1966), German writer and filmmaker
- Olivier Jäckle (born 1993), Swiss footballer
