= Klüssendorf =

Klüssendorf is a German surname. Notable people with the surname include:

- Angelika Klüssendorf (born 1958), German writer
- Tim Klüssendorf (born 1991), German politician
