= Thaddäus-Troll-Preis =

German literary award

Thaddäus-Troll-Preis is a literary prize awarded by the Förderkreis deutscher Schriftsteller in Baden-Württemberg, an organization that supports and sponsors writers in the German state of Baden-Württemberg. The prize is awarded annually to German-language writers resident in the state and is named in honor of Thaddäus Troll, one of the founders of the organization. The prize money is €10,000. In 2023, the prize was renamed the Anna Haag Prize.

== Winners ==
- 1981 Manfred Esser
- 1982 Katja Behrens
- 1983 Michael Spohn
- 1984 Rainer Wochele
- 1985 Gerhard Raff
- 1986 Rafik Schami
- 1987 Ernst Köhler (writer)
- 1988 Carmen Kotarski
- 1989 Eva Christina Zeller
- 1990 Hellmut G. Haasis
- 1991 Urs M. Fiechtner
- 1992 Thommie Bayer
- 1993 Harald Hurst
- 1994 Walle Sayer
- 1995 Michael Buselmeier
- 1996 Arnold Stadler
- 1997 Marcus Hammerschmitt
- 1998 Markus R. Weber
- 1999 Karl-Heinz Ott
- 2000 Joachim Zelter
- 2001 Anna Breitenbach
- 2003 Martin Gülich
- 2005 Angelika Overath
- 2007 Susanne Stephan
- 2008 Annette Pehnt
- 2009 José F. A. Oliver
- 2010 Martin von Arndt
- 2011 Lisa-Marie Dickreiter
- 2012 Sandra Hoffmann
- 2013 Matthias Kehle
- 2014 Katrin Zipse
- 2015 Carolin Callies
- 2016 Felicitas Andresen
- 2017 Manuela Fuelle
- 2018 Kai Wieland
- 2019 Iris Wolff
- 2020 Kai Weyand
- 2021 Christian Schulteisz
- 2022 Cihan Acar
