= Anna Breitenbach =

German author and performance artist

Anna Breitenbach (born 1952) is a German author and performance artist.

She was born in Hessen. She studied German and political science in Göttingen and Tübingen and attended the Deutsche Journalistenschule in Munich. She worked as a radio reporter for Süddeutscher Rundfunk and published her poetry and prose in various literary journals. In 2000, she published her first novel Fremde Leute; in 2003, she published her first book of poetry Feuer.Land. In 2012, she produced the film Guerrilla Gardening with Werner Reichelt. Breitenbach has been living and working in Esslingen and Elmo in Italy.

In 2001, she was awarded the Thaddäus-Troll-Preis for her novel Fremde Leute. In 2005, she was one of the winners in the poetry competition sponsored by C.H. Beck.
