= Hyperion (Hölderlin novel) =

1797–1799 novel by Friedrich Hölderlin

- First English Edition Cover
- Author: Friedrich Hölderlin
- Original title: Hyperion; oder, Der Eremit in Griechenland
- Translator: Willard R. Trask
- Language: German
- Genre: Epistolary novel
- Publication date: 1797 (volume 1), 1799 (volume 2)
- Publication place: Germany
- English publication date: 1965
- Media type: Print
- Pages: 169

Hyperion is an epistolary novel by German poet Friedrich Hölderlin. Originally published in two volumes in 1797 (Volume 1) and 1799 (Volume 2), respectively, the full title is Hyperion; or, The Hermit in Greece (German: "Hyperion; oder, Der Eremit in Griechenland"). Each volume is divided into two books. The work is told in the form of letters from the protagonist, Hyperion, to his German friend Bellarmin, alongside a few letters between Hyperion and his love Diotima in the second volume of the novel, and is noted for its philosophical classicism and expressive imagery.

== Origin ==
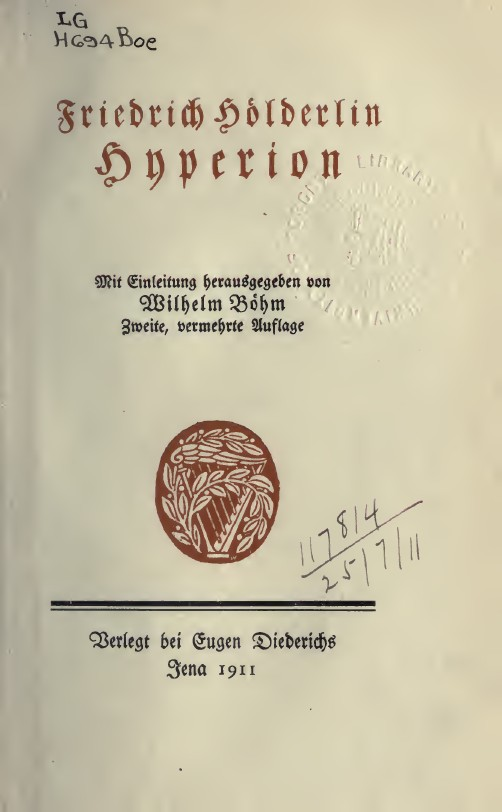
1911 German edition

Hölderlin began working on Hyperion in 1792, as a 22-year-old student at the Tübinger Stift. He further developed it while serving as a Hofmeister on the estate of Charlotte von Kalb, and put finishing touches to the novel while receiving lectures from Johann Gottlieb Fichte at the University of Jena.

== Plot ==
Hyperion is set in Greece and deals with invisible forces, conflicts, beauty, and hope. It recounts Hyperion's attempts to overthrow the Turkish rule in Greece (in one of the footnotes Hölderlin specifically ties events in the novel with the Russians "bringing a fleet into the Archipelago" in 1770, framing the novel's events into the Orlov Revolt), his disillusionment with the rebellion, survival in the deadly Battle of Chesma, his devastation when Diotima dies of a broken heart before they can be reunited and his subsequent life as a hermit in the Greek wilderness, where he embraces the beauty of nature and overcomes the tragedy of his solitude. In the same time Hyperion after all these losses understands the limits of his idealized concept of Greece. An impossibility to travel becomes the essence of his travel.

== Legacy ==
The work contains Hyperions Schicksalslied ("Hyperion's Song of Fate"), an interpolated poem on which Johannes Brahms composed the Schicksalslied, Op. 54 between 1869 and 1871.

In Arnold Fanck's 1926 film Der Heilige Berg, Leni Riefenstahl's character Diotima is named after Hyperion's love.

Between 1960 and 1969 the Italian composer and conductor Bruno Maderna composed the opera Hyperion after Hölderlin's novel.

The Italian composer Luigi Nono included passages from Hyperion in his work Fragmente-Stille, an Diotima for string quartet as part of the score to be "sung" silently by the performers while playing the piece.

In 1983, the German sculptor Angela Laich created a sculpture named Hyperion, after the main character of the Hölderlin novel.

Hyperion is included in the 2006 literary reference book 1001 Books You Must Read Before You Die.

== English translations of Hyperion ==
- Hyperion or The Hermit in Greece translated by Willard R. Trask (Frederick Ungar Publishing Co., 1965)
- Hyperion translated by Ross Benjamin (Archipelago Books, 2008) ISBN 978-0-9793330-2-6
- Hyperion or the Hermit in Greece translated by India Russell (Melrose Books, 2016) ISBN 978-1-9112803-2-3
- Hyperion or the Hermit in Greece translated by Howard Gaskill (Open Book Publishers, 2019) ISBN 978-1-7837465-5-2
