= Maxim Biller =

German writer and columnist

Maxim Biller (born 25 August 1960 in Prague, Czechoslovakia) is a German writer and columnist.

== Early life ==
Born in Prague to Soviet Jewish parents, Rada Biller and Semjon-Jevsej Biller. He emigrated with his parents and sister to West Germany in 1970, when he was ten years old. After living for a long time in Hamburg and Munich, he now lives in Berlin, frequently writing about issues relating to Jewish and German relations. His maternal grandfather was Armenian.

== Works ==
In 2003 his novel Esra excited attention when its sale was prohibited shortly after its release. Two persons had a provisional order obtained, because they claimed to have seen themselves reflected in characters in the book. A German court obliged their request to take the book from circulation on these grounds.

His first works translated into English (by Anthea Bell) are the collection Love Today (2008), some of which appeared in The New Yorker.

=== Beliefs ===
Biller strongly identifies as a Zionist and is very critical of antisemitism within the anti-Zionist movement.

== Controversy ==
In June 2025, Biller published a column in Die Zeit titled Morbus Israel. In it, he described the Israeli government's starvation blockade of Gaza as "strategically correct." He also made a joke about an Israeli soldier who goes to a doctor and says he no longer wants to kill Arabs, to which the doctor advises him against stopping. Biller claimed that the German public exhibits a pathological obsession with Israeli policy during the war in Israel and Gaza. He wrote that critics of Israel’s actions in Gaza — such as Tilo Jung, Ralf Stegner, or Amnesty International — were on a “pathological, likely psychologically very stressful anti-Israel horror trip.” Following criticism of the column, The piece was quietly removed by Die Zeit because it apparently “did not meet the newspaper’s editorial standards”.

== Publications ==
- Wenn ich einmal reich und tot bin: Erzählungen (Someday when I'm rich and dead: Narratives), Kiepenheuer & Witsch, Cologne 1990, ISBN 3-423-11624-2 (including the narrative Harlem Holocaust)
- Die Tempojahre: Essays und Reportagen, Deutscher Taschenbuch-Verlag, Munich 1991, ISBN 3-423-11427-4
- Aufbruch nach Deutschland: Sechzehn Foto-Essays
- Land der Väter und Verräter: Erzählungen, Kiepenheuer & Witsch, Cologne 1994, ISBN 3-423-12356-7
- Harlem Holocaust (short novel), Kiepenheuer & Witsch, Cologne 1998, ISBN 3-462-02761-1
- Die Tochter, Kiepenheuer & Witsch, Cologne 2000, ISBN 3-423-12933-6
- Kühltransport, 2001
- Deutschbuch, 2001
- Esra : Roman, 2003, ISBN 3-462-03213-5 (distribution was prohibited from publishing by court)
- Der perfekte Roman: Das Maxim-Biller-Lesebuch, 2003
- Bernsteintage: Erzählungen, 2004
- Maxim Biller Tapes (CD with songs and poems), 2004
- I Love My Leid (video), 2004
- Moralische Geschichten: Satirische Kurzgeschichten, Kiepenheuer & Witsch, Cologne 2005 ISBN 3-462-03477-4
- Adas größter Wunsch (children's book), 2005
- Menschen in falschen Zusammenhängen (comedy), 2006
- Liebe heute (short stories), 2007
- Ein verrückter Vormittag (children's book), 2008
- Der gebrauchte Jude (self-portrait), Kiepenheuer & Witsch, Cologne 2009, ISBN 978-3-462-03703-6
- Kanalratten (theater play), Fischer 2013 ISBN 978-3-596-19007-2
- Im Kopf von Bruno Schulz: Novelle, Kiepenheuer & Witsch, Cologne 2013, ISBN 978-3-462-04605-2
- Jack Happy (children's book), Atlantik, Hamburg 2014, ISBN 3-455-37008-X
- Biografie: Roman, Kiepenheuer & Witsch, Cologne 2016, ISBN 978-3-462-04898-8
- Mama Odessa: Roman, Kiepenheuer & Witsch, Cologne 2023, ISBN 978-3-462-00486-1

== Awards ==
- 1994 Toucan Prize from the city of Munich
- 1996 Preis des Europäischen Feuilletons: "Feuilleton" are the culture pages in German speaking newspaper
- 1996 Otto Stoessl Prize
- 1999 Theodor Wolff Prize
- 2008 Brothers Grimm Poetics Professorship of University of Kassel
- 2012 Würth-Literaturpreis
