= Brothers Grimm Poetics Professorship =

German visiting professorship

The Brothers Grimm Poetics Professorship is a visiting professorship established within the University of Kassel since the summer semester of 1985. The honor is given to writers and filmmakers as well as to cultural workers from the fields of theater, art and culture. The award is traditionally associated with a public poetry lecture, a public reading and a poetry seminar for Kassel students. Namesakes are the Brothers Grimm, who lived in Kassel.

== Recipients ==
- 1985 – Dieter Kühn
- 1986/87 – Tankred Dorst
- 1988 – Hans-Joachim Schädlich
- 1990 – Klaus Harpprecht
- 1991/92 – Oskar Pastior
- 1993/94 – Guntram Vesper
- 1996 – Sarah Kirsch
- 1998 – Herta Müller
- 2000 – Volker Braun
- 2001 – Ludwig Harig
- 2002 – Christoph Hein
- 2003 – Marlene Streeruwitz
- 2004 – Friedrich Christian Delius
- 2005 – Eva Demski
- 2006 – Erich Hackl
- 2007 – Birgit Vanderbeke
- 2008 – Maxim Biller
- 2009 – Ingo Schulze
- 2010 – Rafik Schami
- 2011 – Volker Schlöndorff
- 2012 – Uwe Timm
- 2013 – Sibylle Lewitscharoff
- 2014 – Ilija Trojanow
- 2015 – Paul Maar
- 2016 – Sven Regener
- 2017 – Juli Zeh
- 2018 – Klaus Hoffer
- 2019 – Felicitas Hoppe
- 2021 – Terézia Mora
- 2022 – Doris Dörrie
- 2023 – Feridun Zaimoglu
- 2024 – Johannes Schmid
- 2025 – Judith Hermann
