= Angelika Overath =

German author and journalist

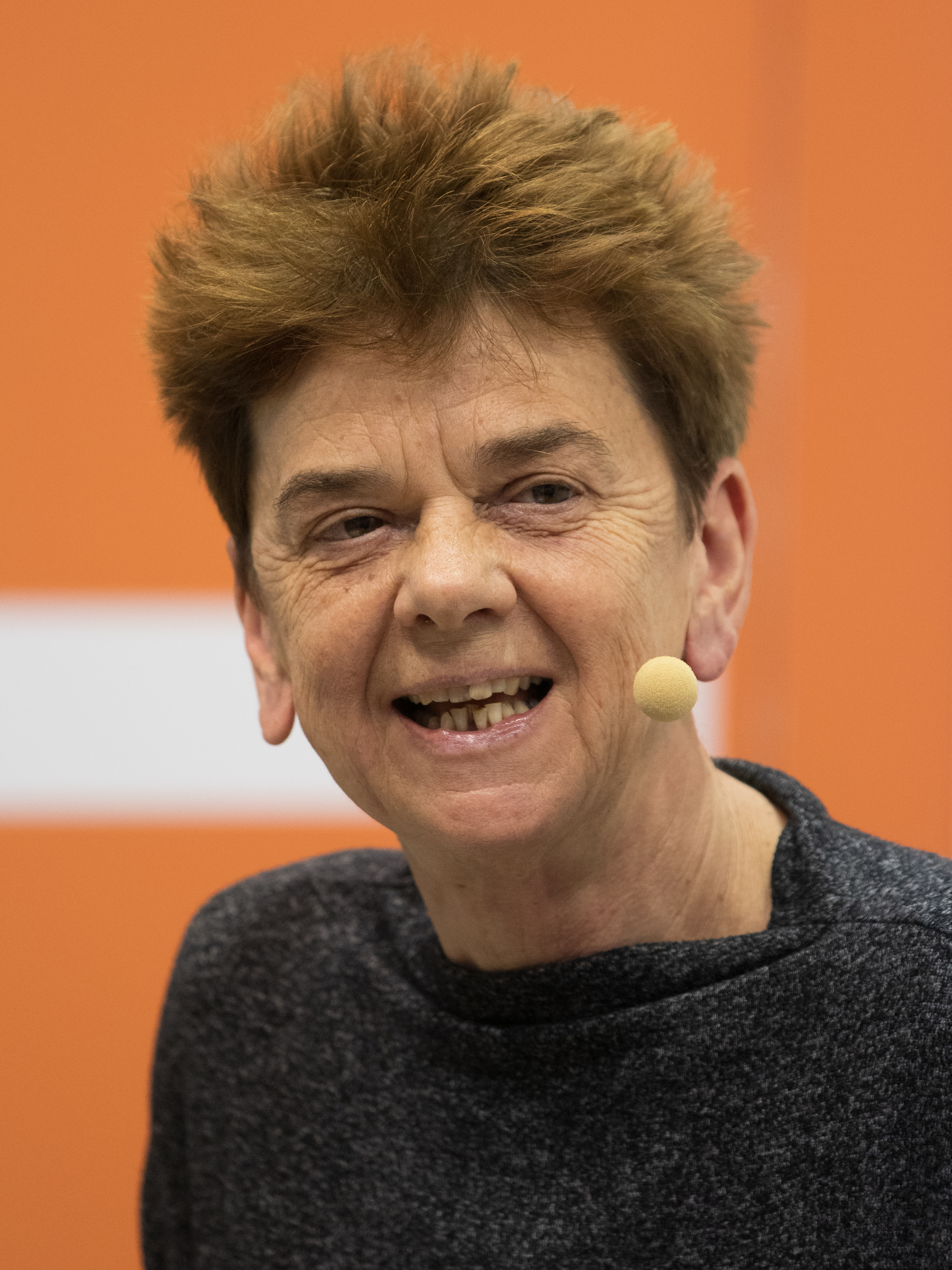
- Overath at Frankfurt Book Fair, 2018
- Born: 1957 (age 68–69); Karlsruhe, Baden-Württemberg, West Germany
- Education: University of Tübingen
- Spouse: Manfred Koch
- Children: 3
- Writing career
- Language: Romansh

Angelika Overath (born 17 July 1957 in Karlsruhe) is a German author and journalist.

Overath studied German literature, history, Italian Studies, and cultural studies at the University of Tübingen and wrote a PhD thesis in 1986 about the colour blue in modern literature.

She regularly works as Writer in Residence for the German Section in the School of Modern Languages, Newcastle University, and at Queen Mary's College, London. She also teaches creative writing for the Swiss Hyperwerk and has founded the Schreibschule Sent which offers seminars in creative writing both in German and Romansch.

== Prizes ==
- 1996 Egon-Erwin-Kisch Prize for literary reportage
- 2002/2003 One-year scholarship of the Deutscher Literaturfonds, Darmstadt
- 2005 Thaddäus-Troll Prize
- 2006 Ernst-Willner-Prize at the Ingeborg-Bachmann-Competition
- 2007: Ten-week London scholarship from the German Literature Fund, as Writer-in-Residence at Queen Mary University of London
- 2008 Swiss prize for independent journalism
- 2009 Longlist for the German Book Prize by the Börsenverein Deutscher Buchhandel
- 2009 Shortlist for the Swiss Book Prize
- 2023 Longlist German Book Prize

== Books ==
- Das andere Blau, Zur Poetik einer Farbe im modernen Gedicht. (1987) Stuttgart: Metzler.
- Händler der verlorenen Farben. (1998) Lengwil: Libelle.
- Vom Sekundenglück brennender Papierchen. (2000) Lengwil: Libelle.
- Schlimme Ehen. Ein Hochzeitsbuch, aus vielen Quellen zusammengetragen. together with Manfred Koch. (2000) Frankfurt: Eichborn.
- Spatzenweisheit. together with Horst Munzig. (2001) Freiburg: Herder.
  - Mussenpraat. Dutch translation by Annette van Schoonhoven. (2003) Amsterdam: Palet Gifts. ISBN 978-90-427-0026-0.
- Schlaflos: das Buch der hellen Nächte. together with Manfred Koch. (2002) Lengwil: Libelle.
- Die Kunst des Einfachen. together with Manfred Koch. (2000) Freiburg: Herder.
- Toleranz. together with Navid Kermani and Robert Schindel. (2003) Göttingen: Wallstein.
- Das halbe Brot der Vögel. (2004) Göttingen: Wallstein.
- Generationen-Bilder. (2005) Lengwil: Libelle.
- Nahe Tage. novel (2005) Göttingen: Wallstein. / (2008) Munich: dtv.
- Genies und ihre Geheimnisse. 100 biographische Rätsel. together with Manfred Koch and Silvia Overath (2007) Berlin: List.
- Hunde mitzubringen ist erlaubt: Ein literarischer Salon. together with Manfred Koch. (2008) Berlin: List.
- Genies und ihre Geheimnisse, Band 2. 100 neue biographische Rätsel. together with Manfred Koch and Silvia Overath. (2009) Berlin: List.
- Flughafenfische. novel. (2009) Munich: Luchterhand.
  - Short interview with the author about the genesis of the book and the difficulties translating her.
- Alle Farben des Schnees. Senter Tagebuch. (2010) Munich: Luchterhand.
  - English review in New Books in German
  - Rumantsch and German Interview in Televisiun Rumantscha
- Sie dreht sich um. Munich: Luchterhand 2014, ISBN 978-3-630-87349-7 [Excerpt http://www.randomhouse.de/leseprobe/Sie-dreht-sich-um-Roman/leseprobe_9783630873497.pdf], dedicated to Henrike Lähnemann
- Corniglias – Alpendohlen. Mit Illustrationen von Madlaina Janett. SJW Schweizerisches Jugendschriftenwerk 2017. ISBN 978-3-7269-0093-9.
- Ein Winter in Istanbul. Munich: Luchterhand 2018, translation of a short extract in the Fortnightly Review
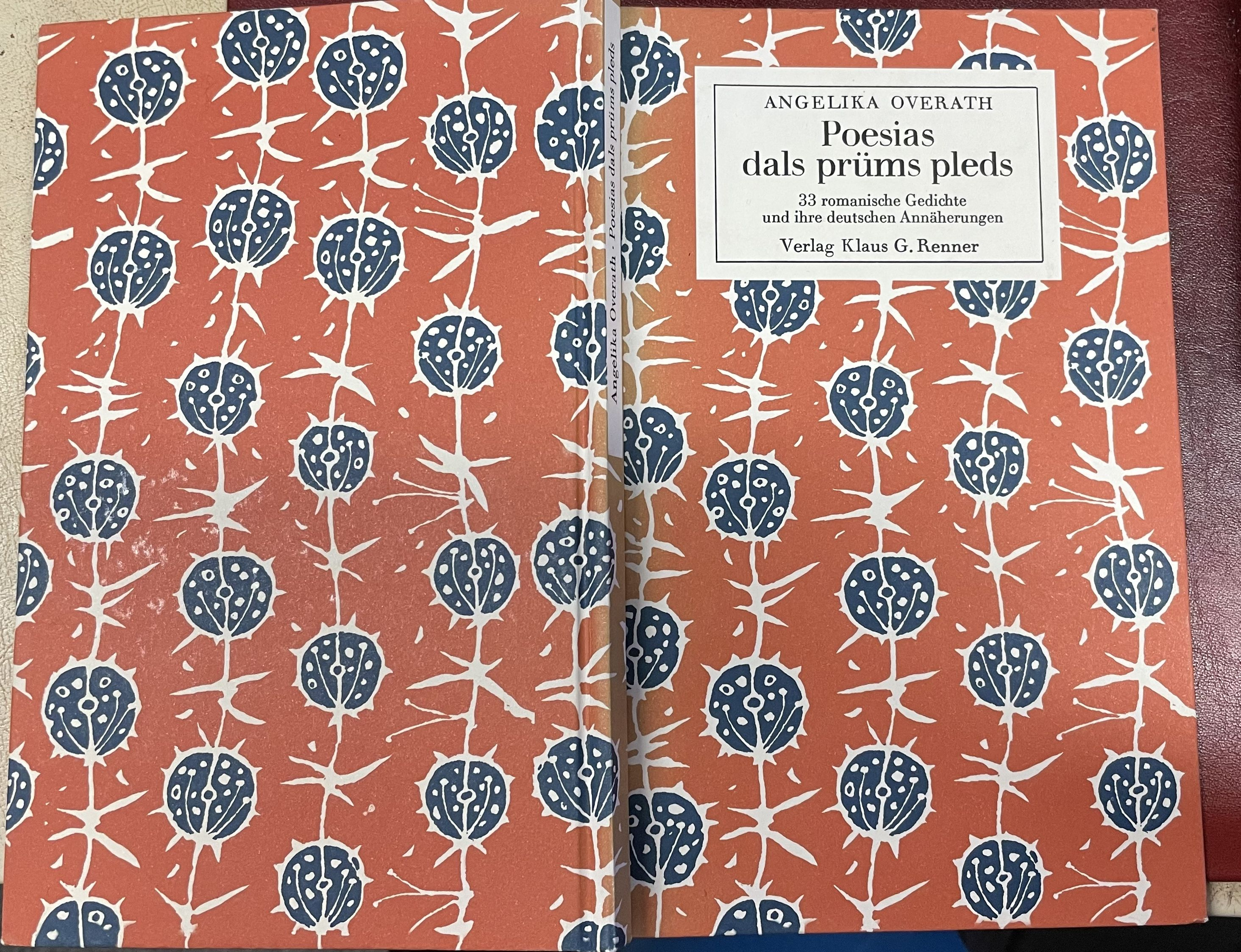
- Erstausgabe 'Poesias dals prüms pleds'
  So träume und verschwinde ich. Liebesgedichte von Edip Cansever, Cemal Süreya und Turgut Uyar. Türkisch-Deutsch, herausgegeben und übersetzt zusammen mit Nursel Gülenaz, btb München 2021, ISBN 978-3-442-71757-6.
- Krautwelten. Insel Bücherei 1504, Suhrkamp 2021, ISBN 978-3-458-19504-7.
- Schwarzhandel mit dem Himmel/ Marchà nair cul azur. Gedichte Deutsch/Vallader. Telegramme Verlag, Zürich 2022, ISBN 978-3-907198-58-2.
- Unschärfen der Liebe. Luchterhand, München 2023, ISBN 978-3-630-87634-4
- Engadinerinnen. Frauenleben in einem hohen Tal. Limmat Verlag, Zürich 2024, ISBN 978-3-03926-067-6.
- Calanda oder Alvas Antwort. Luchterhand 2026. ISBN 978-3-630-87786-0.
