= Gertrud Leutenegger =

Swiss writer (1948–2025)

- Leutenegger, c. 2008
- Born: 7 December 1948; Schwyz, Switzerland
- Died: 20 June 2025 (aged 76); Schwyz, Switzerland
- Occupations: Novelist; Poet; Playwright
- Writing career
- Notable awards: Roswitha Prize; Solothurner Literaturpreis

Gertrud Leutenegger (7 December 1948 – 20 June 2025) was a Swiss poet, novelist and playwright who wrote in German. Her first novel, Vorabend, appeared in 1975. Her last novel, the 2014 Panischer Frühling, earned her shortlisting in major German and Swiss awards and the Roswitha Prize. Her work, told in the first person, has been described as "a finely woven, quiet art with a tone all of its own, a searching, groping literature".

== Biography ==
Gertrud Leutenegger was born in Schwyz on 7 December 1948 and grew up there. Her father was a book editor. She later lived in both the Italian-speaking and French-speaking parts of Switzerland. After completing her secondary education, she initially undertook teacher training and became a kindergarten teacher. She also worked in a psychiatric clinic for a time and as a custodian at the Nietzsche House in Sils Maria.

Leutenegger's interest in theatre led to drama studies at the Zurich University of the Arts from 1976 to 1979. She worked as assistant producer to Jürgen Flimm at the Deutsches Schauspielhaus play theatre in Hamburg in 1978. The same year, she was awarded the jury prize of the Ingeborg Bachmann Prize for her early literary work. Many other prizes and distinctions followed.

After short spells in Florence and Berlin, Leutenegger lived in Japan for a long time. In her later years, she lived in Zurich. In 2010, she was elected to the German Academy for Language and Literature in Darmstadt.

Leutenegger died in Schwyz on 20 June 2025, at the age of 76.

== Work ==
Leutenegger first came to prominence as a poet, later bringing her poetic vision to her novels, the first of which, Vorabend, was published in 1975 by Suhrkamp who remained her main publisher. Reviewers noted that it combined memories of childhood, dreams, poetic descriptions of nature and a "quiet protest against the state of the world". Her work is noted for its subjective vision, use of myth and fairy tale, dreams and poetry. There is also a strong element of political engagement, for example in the 1985 novel Kontinent which deals with issues of environmental damage. She wrote fiction in the first person, less dealing with action than with the development of a person's inquiring mind. In Matutin (2008) a person climbs a tower, and in Späte Gäste (2020) she holds a vigil for a dead man in a villa, from whom she tried to escape in an earlier novel.

Leutenegger's last published work was the novel Panischer Frühling, telling the story of a woman stranded in London when the eruption of the Icelandic volcano Eyjafjallajökull in 2010 brought all air traffic to a sudden halt. A relationship develops there between her and a homeless newspaper vendor, Jonathan, whose face is disfigured by a port-wine stain; the narrator says: "The fact that a stranger lets us into his interior is exciting, of such warmth and just as incomprehensible as being killed by him." This was shortlisted for both the Swiss Book Prize and the German Book Prize in 2014 and was awarded the Roswitha Prize in the same year. Her work has been described as "a finely woven, quiet art with a tone all of its own, a searching, groping literature that finds less than it is found".

== Awards ==
- 1978 Jury prize of the Ingeborg Bachmann Prize
- 1979 Droste-Preis
- 1986 Prize of the Schweizerische Schillerstiftung
- 1999 Innerschweizer Kulturpreis
- 2009 Schiller Prize of the Zurich Cantonal Bank: for Matutin
- 2014 Shortlisted for the Swiss Book Prize: for Panischer Frühling
- 2014 Shortlisted for the German Book Prize: for Panischer Frühling
- 2014 Roswitha Prize of the town of Bad Gandersheim: for Panischer Frühling
- 2021 Kunstpreis Zollikon
- 2023 Solothurner Literaturpreis
- 2024 Kunstpreis der Stadt Zürich

== Works ==
Leutenegger's works, all in German, include:

- Leutenegger, Gertrud (1980). Vorabend : Roman (in German). Frankfurt am Main: Suhrkamp. ISBN 3-518-37142-8. OCLC 8151033. (novel)
- —— (1977). Ninive : Roman. Suhrkamp. ISBN 3-518-03536-3. OCLC 3190000. (novel)
- —— (1980). Lebewohl, gute Reise: Ein dramatisches Poem. Suhrkamp. ISBN 3-518-11001-2. OCLC 6981931. (dramatic poem)
- —— (1981). Wie in Salomons Garten: Gedichte. Düsseldorf: Eremiten-Presse. ISBN 3-87365-162-9. OCLC 7864812. (poems)
- —— (1981). Gouverneur. Suhrkamp. ISBN 3-518-03534-7. OCLC 8054393.
- —— (1989). Komm ins Schiff. Suhrkamp. ISBN 3-518-38199-7. OCLC 23749546.
- —— (1991). Kontinent (in German). Suhrkamp. ISBN 978-3-518-38369-8. OCLC 75209771.
- —— (1985). Das verlorene Monument. Suhrkamp. ISBN 3-518-11315-1. OCLC 12634105.
- —— (1988). Meduse (in German). Suhrkamp. ISBN 3-518-02273-3. OCLC 19554286.
- —— (1994). Acheron (in German). Suhrkamp. ISBN 3-518-40577-2. OCLC 30336330.
- ——; Bättig, Ester (1999). Sphärenklang: Dramatisches Poem. Eremiten-Presse. ISBN 3-87365-306-0. OCLC 47803788. (dramatic poem)
- —— (2004). Pomona : Roman. Suhrkamp. ISBN 3-518-41603-0. OCLC 54476127. (novel)
- —— (2006). Gleich nach dem Gotthard kommt der Mailänder Dom: Geschichten und andere Prosa. Suhrkamp. ISBN 3-518-41834-3. OCLC 71747465. (stories and other prose)
- —— (2008). Matutin: Roman. Suhrkamp. ISBN 978-3-518-42029-4. OCLC 254923499. (novel)
- —— (2017). Das Klavier auf dem Schillerstein: Prosa. Wädenswil am Zürichsee: Nimbus. ISBN 978-3-03850-035-3. OCLC 1005074043. (prose)
- —— (2020). Späte Gäste: Roman. Suhrkamp. (novel)
