= Angela Laich =

German artist

Angela Isabella Laich (born 24 March 1963 in Stuttgart, West Germany) is a sculptor, draughtsperson, and painter, who specialises in figurative sculpture. She was taught by Alfred Hrdlicka and has been a substantial part of significant art exhibitions throughout Germany.

== Education ==
Laich was educated at the State Academy of Fine Arts Stuttgart and completed advanced training as a Meisterschüler at Berlin University of the Arts.

During the 1980s she gained practical experiences in Austria, Italy, France and East Germany. Laich further developed her art skills on extensive creative voyages throughout England, Norway, Finland, and Russia.

== Exhibitions ==
- Permanent exhibition at the Memorial for Victims of Terror, Brandenburg-Görden Prison, Berlin, since 1993
- Temporary exhibition In Gedenken an Joseph Süß Oppenheimer [In memory of Joseph Süß Oppenheimer], Stuttgart City Hall, 1998–2000
- Permanent exhibition of the marble sculptures in Märkischer Künstlerhof, Brieselang, since 2000
- Temporary exhibitions Terra Erotika, Märkischer Künstlerhof, Brieselang, 2007, 2010

== Works ==
Laich works with marble, bronze, soapstone and other materials including wood.

"Hyperion", Krastaler marble, height 200 cm, 1987. On 9 June 1992 the statue "Hyperion" was damaged when its head was cut off and stolen by an unknown person. A police investigation did not succeed in finding the perpetrator. The creation of "Hyperion" was the result of "three summer's work, from 1985 until 1987" at the Krastal Symposium. Photographic images of the complete statue exist.

"Saint Sebastian", Krastaler marble, height 130 cm, 1993.

"Ein Justizmord in Stuttgart", Ein Triptychon [A juridical murder in Stuttgart – triptych], graphic 50x70 cm 1999.

Graphics for the historian Hellmut G. Haasis's book Joseph Süß Oppenheimer genannt Jud Süß. Finanzier, Freidenker, Justizopfer.

"Joseph Süß Oppenheimer", Ordinario marble, height 230 cm, 1997.

"The Brandenburg Gate", poliurethan, the scale of 1:25, 2004.
