= Birgit Vanderbeke =

German writer (1956–2021)

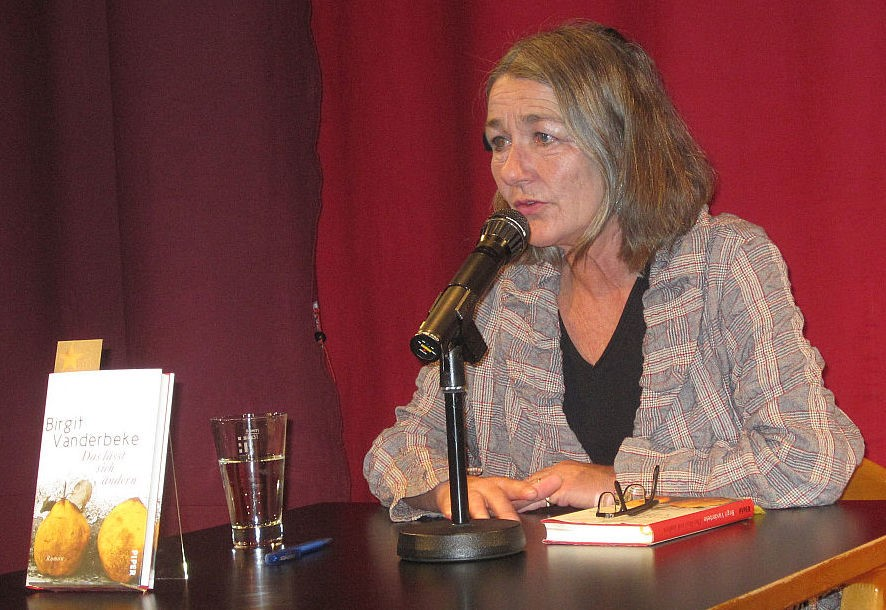
Vanderbeke, 2011 in Marburg

Birgit Vanderbeke (8 August 1956 – 24 December 2021) was a German writer.

== Biography ==
Born in Dahme, East Germany, Vanderbeke grew up in Frankfurt am Main, Hesse, after her family moved to West Germany in 1961.

Vanderbeke studied Law, Germanic and Romance languages. The English translation of her debut novel, Das Muschelessen, by Jamie Bulloch was published in 2013 by Peirene Press as The Mussel Feast. In 1993, she settled in southern France.

She died on 24 December 2021, at age of 65.

== Works ==
- Das Muschelessen, narrative. Rotbuch, Berlin 1990, ISBN 3-596-13783-7 (1993 als Rotbuch-Taschenbuch, Band 77, ISBN 3-88022-097-2 / als Fischer-TB Band 13 783, Frankfurt am Main 1997, ISBN 3-596-13783-7).
  - Translation: The Mussel Feast, translator: Jamie Bulloch, Peirene, London 2013, ISBN 978-1-908670-08-3.
- Fehlende Teile, narrative. Rotbuch, Berlin 1992, ISBN 3-596-13784-5.
- Gut genug, narrative. Rotbuch, Berlin 1993, ISBN 3-596-13785-3 (1996 als Rotbuch-Taschenbuch, Band 1030, ISBN 3-88022-398-X / als Fischer-Taschenbuch Band 13 785, Frankfurt am Main 1999, ISBN 3-596-13785-3).
- Ich will meinen Mord, Rowohlt, Berlin 1995, ISBN 3-596-15925-3.
- Friedliche Zeiten, narrative. Rotbuch, Hamburg 1996, ISBN 3-596-13786-1 (als Fischer-Taschenbuch, Band 13 786, Frankfurt am Main 2000, ISBN 3-596-13786-1).
- Alberta empfängt einen Liebhaber, narrative. Fest, Berlin 1997, ISBN 3-596-14198-2 (als Hörbuch: 2 MC bei Hörverlag München 1998, ISBN 3-89584-451-9).
- Ich sehe was, was Du nicht siehst, Fest, Berlin 1999, ISBN 3-8286-0100-6 (als Fischer-Taschenbuch, Band 15 001, Frankfurt am Main 2001, ISBN 3-596-15001-9).
- Hexenreden (mit Gisela von Wysocki und Marlene Streeruwitz). In: Göttinger Sudelblätter, Wallstein, Göttingen 1999, ISBN 3-89244-372-6.
- Ariel oder der Sturm auf die weiße Wäsche (editing and epilogue Ralph Schock). In: Rede an die Abiturienten des Jahrgangs 2000, Gollenstein, Blieskastel 2001, ISBN 3-933389-44-5.
- Abgehängt, narrative. S. Fischer, Frankfurt am Main 2001, ISBN 3-10-087020-4 (als Fischer-Taschenbuch, Band 15 622, Frankfurt am Main 2002, ISBN 3-596-15622-X).
- Gebrauchsanweisung für Südfrankreich, Piper 7515, München / Zürich 2002, ISBN 3-492-27515-X.
- Geld oder Leben, S. Fischer, Frankfurt am Main 2003, ISBN 3-10-087021-2.
- Schmeckt’s?, Cooking without taboos. S. Fischer, Frankfurt am Main 2004, ISBN 978-3-10-087025-4.
- Sweet sixteen, S. Fischer, Frankfurt am Main 2005, ISBN 3-10-087026-3.
- Die sonderbare Karriere der Frau Choi, S. Fischer, Frankfurt am Main 2007, ISBN 978-3-10-087086-5 (als Fischer-Taschenbuch Band 17 460, Frankfurt am Main 2009, ISBN 3-596-17460-0).
- Das lässt sich ändern, Piper, München / Zürich 2011, ISBN 978-3-492-05456-0.
- Die Frau mit dem Hund, Piper, München / Zürich 2012, ISBN 978-3-492-05511-6.
- Der Sommer der Wildschweine, Piper, München / Zürich 2013, ISBN 978-3-492-05622-9.
- Ich freue mich, dass ich geboren bin, Piper, München / Zürich 2016, ISBN 978-3-492-05754-7.
  - Translation: You Would Have Missed Me, translator: Jamie Bulloch, Peirene, London 2019, ISBN 978-1-908670-52-6.
- Wer dann noch lachen kann, novel. Piper, München / Zürich 2017, ISBN 978-3-492-05839-1.
- Alle, die vor uns da waren, novel. Piper, München / Zürich 2020, ISBN 978-3-492-31460-2.

== Awards and honours ==
- 1990 Ingeborg-Bachmann-Preis for Muschelessen
- 1997 Kranichsteiner Literaturpreis
- 1999 Solothurner Literaturpreis
- 1999 Roswitha Prize
- 2002 Hans Fallada Prize
- 2007 Brothers Grimm Poetics Professorship at University of Kassel
- 2014 Independent Foreign Fiction Prize shortlist for The Mussel Feast (German; trans. Jamie Bulloch)
