= Roswitha Prize =

German literary award

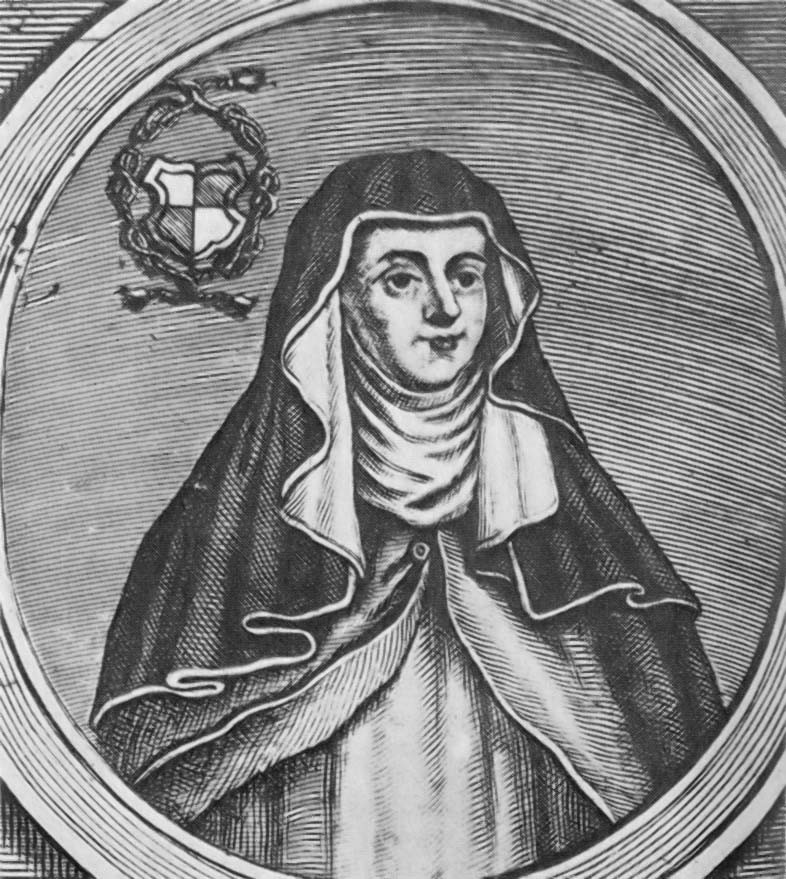
Roswitha of Gandersheim, after whom the award is named

The Roswitha Prize (German: Roswitha-Preis) is the oldest German language prize for literature that is given solely to women.

The Roswitha-Medal has been given almost yearly since 1973 by the city of Bad Gandersheim. In 1998 it received its modern designation along with an endowment of €5,500. It is named for Roswitha of Gandersheim, a 10th-century Benedictine nun who is considered the first female German playwright and author.

== Recipients ==
- 1973 Marie-Luise Kaschnitz
- 1974 Hilde Domin
- 1975 Ilse Aichinger
- 1976 Elisabeth Borchers
- 1977 Dagmar Nick
- 1978 Elfriede Jelinek
- 1979 Luise Rinser
- 1980 Rose Ausländer
- 1981 Hilde Spiel
- 1982 Friederike Mayröcker
- 1983 Sarah Kirsch
- 1984 Greta Schoon
- 1985 Irmtraud Morgner
- 1986 Ulla Hahn
- 1987 Irina Korschunow
- 1988 Gerlind Reinshagen
- 1989 Helga M. Novak
- 1990 Herta Müller
- 1991 (No award)
- 1992 Helga Königsdorf
- 1993 Christa Reinig
- 1994 Monika Maron
- 1995 Libuse Monikova
- 1996 Gisela von Wysocki
- 1997 (No award)
- 1998 Carola Stern
- 1999 Birgit Vanderbeke
- 2000 Silvia Bovenschen
- 2001 Erika Fuchs
- 2002 Katja Lange-Müller
- 2003 Antje Rávic Strubel
- 2004 Angelika Klüssendorf
- 2005 Julia Franck
- 2006 Ruth Klüger
- 2007 Felicitas Hoppe
- 2008 Cornelia Funke
- 2009 (No award)
- 2010 Anna Katharina Hahn
- 2011 Olga Martynova
- 2012 Elke Erb
- 2013 Ulrike Draesner
- 2014 Gertrud Leutenegger
- 2015 Gabriele Goettle
- 2016 Nora Bossong
- 2017 Petra Morsbach
- 2018 Terézia Mora
- 2019 Monika Rinck
- 2020 Ulrike Almut Sandig
- 2021 Emine Sevgi Özdamar
- 2022 Annegret Held
- 2023 Ulrike Edschmid
- 2024 Lucy Fricke
- 2026 Barbara Yelin

== See also ==
- German literature
- List of literary awards honoring women
- List of literary awards
- List of poetry awards
- List of years in literature
- List of years in poetry
