= Evangelischer Buchpreis =

German literary award

Evangelischer Buchpreis (English: Protestant Book Prize), is an annual literary award in Germany since 1979. The books are nominated by the public and the award is given by a jury. The prize is awarded by Evangelisches Literaturportal. The prize money was €5,000, in 2025 it was increased to €10,000. The award aims to highlight Protestant Christian Books and Authors.

== Recipients ==
Year	Genre	Author	Book Title
1979	Non-fiction	Hildegund Fischle-Carl	Sich selbst begreifen
1980	Novel	Rudolf Otto Wiemer	Mahnke. Die Geschichte eines Lückenbüßers
1981	Biography	Hiltgunt Zassenhaus	Ein Baum blüht im November
1982	Poetry	Kurt Marti	abendland
1983	Novel	Ingeborg Drewitz	Gestern war heute. Hundert Jahre Gegenwart
1984	Non-fiction	Erika Schuchardt	Warum gerade ich…? Leben lernen in Krisen
1985	Biography	Heinrich Albertz	Blumen für Stukenbrock
1986	Poetry	Rose Ausländer	Mein Atem heißt jetzt
1987	Novel	Hans Bemmann	Stein und Flöte: und das ist noch nicht alles
1988	Non-fiction	Carl Friedrich von Weizsäcker	Die Zeit drängt
1989	Biography	Sigrid Damm	Cornelia Goethe
1990	Poetry	Wulf Kirsten	Die Erde bei Meißen – Gedichte
1991	Novel	Erich Hackl	Abschied von Sidonie
1992	Non-fiction	Paul Geiersbach	Warten bis die Züge wieder fahren. Ein Türkenghetto in Deutschland
1993	Biography	Renate Wind	Dem Rad in die Speichen fallen: Die Lebensgeschichte des Dietrich Bonhoeffer
1994	Poetry	Eva Zeller	Ein Stein aus Davids Hirtentasche
1995	Novel	Monika Maron	Stille Zeile Sechs
1996	Non-fiction	Michael Bode Christian Wolf	Still- Leben mit Vater. Zur Anwesenheit von Vätern in der Familie.
1997	Biography	Sumaya Farhat-Naser	Thymian und Steine: Eine palästinensische Lebensgeschichte
1998	Children's and young adult literature	Klaus Kordon	Der erste Frühling
1999	Poetry	Ludwig Steinherr	Erste Blicke, letzte Blicke
2000	Novel	Bernhard Schlink	Der Vorleser
2001	Biography	Alois Prinz	Beruf Philosophin oder Die Liebe zur Welt
2002	Children's and young adult literature	Cornelia Funke	Herr der Diebe
2003	Prose for Adults	Ralf Rothmann	Milch und Kohle
2004	Children's and young adult literature	Helene Kynast	Sunshine
2005	Prose for Adults	Sabine Peters	Abschied
2006	Children's and young adult literature	Kirsten Boie	Die Medlevinger
2007	Prose for Adults	Jens Petersen	Die Haushälterin
2008	Children's and young adult literature	Iva Prochazkova	Wir treffen uns, wenn alle weg sind
2009	Prose for Adults	Friedrich Christian Delius	Bildnis der Mutter als junge Frau
2010	Children's and young adult literature	Marlene Röder	Zebraland
2011	Novel	Michael Kleeberg	Das amerikanische Hospital
2012	Non-fiction	Katja Thimm	Vatertage. Eine deutsche Geschichte
2013	Novel	Jenny Erpenbeck	Aller Tage Abend
2014	Young adult book	Sarah Michaela Orlovský	Tomaten mögen keinen Regen
2015	Novel	Nina Jäckle	Der lange Atem
2016	Picture book	Helga Bansch	Die Rabenrosa
2017	Young adult book	Jörn Klare	Nach Hause gehen: Eine Heimatsuche
2018	Novel	Susann Pásztor	Und dann steht einer auf und öffnet das Fenster
2019	Young adult book	Nora Krug	Heimat – Ein deutsches Familienalbum
2020	Novel	Norbert Scheuer	Winterbienen
2021	Novel	Iris Wolff	Die Unschärfe der Welt
2022	Children's book	Nikola Huppertz	Schön wie die Acht
2023	Novel	Abbas Khider	Der Erinnerungsfälscher
2024	Novel	Milena Michiko Flaša	Oben Erde, unten Himmel
2025	Young adult novel	Volker Surmann	Leon Hertz und die Sache mit der Traurigkeit
2026	Novel	Annett Gröschner	Schwebende Lasten
