= Nora Krug =

German–American author and illustrator

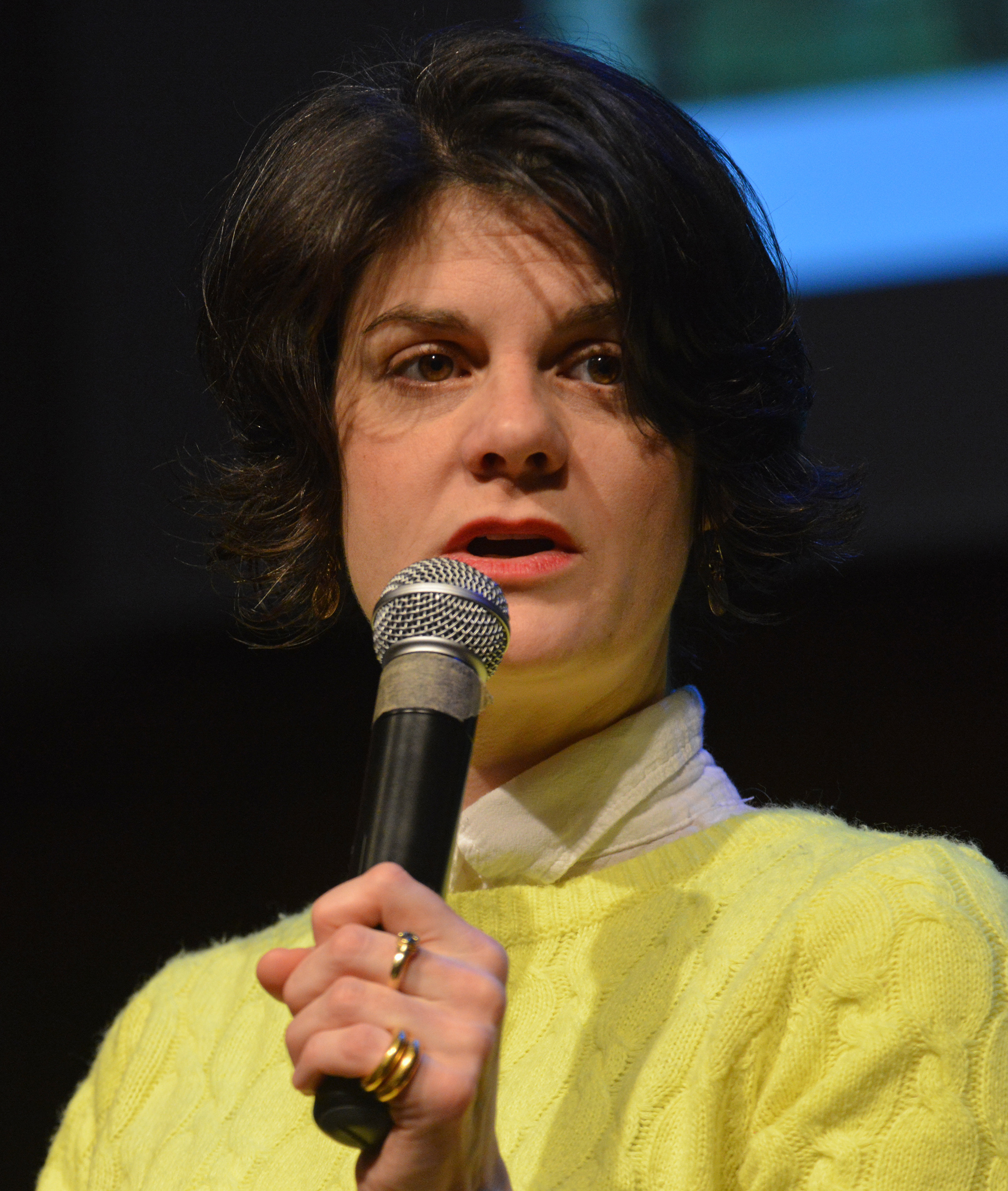
- Krug at the Angoulême International Comics Festival in 2019
- Born: 1977 (age 48–49); Karlsruhe, West Germany
- Education: Liverpool Institute for Performing Arts; Berlin University of the Arts; MFA., School of Visual Arts
- Occupation: Author
- Notable work: Belonging: A German Reckons With History and Home
- Awards: National Book Critics Circle Award in Autobiography; Schubart-Literaturpreis; Evangelischer Buchpreis
- Website: nora-krug.com

Nora Krug (born 1977) is a German–American author and illustrator. Her graphic memoir Belonging: A German Reckons With History and Home won the 2018 National Book Critics Circle Award in Autobiography, the 2019 Schubart-Literaturpreis, and the 2019 Evangelischer Buchpreis. She is also an associate professor of Illustration at the Parsons School of Design in New York City.

== Early life ==
Krug was born in 1977 in Karlsruhe, West Germany. Growing up in Karlsruhe provided what she has called "a political lession learned early", as the city is near France's Alsace region, where some towns keep old World War II tanks on display with their cannons pointed towards Germany. Seeing these displays when bicycling through Alsace as a child prompted her father to explain their historical significance to her. In her teens, she pursued interests in the violin and classical music, as well as drawing and painting.

Krug attended a specialized middle and high school for classical music but chose to pursue a career in drawing at the Liverpool Institute for Performing Arts. She returned to Germany briefly to study Visual Communication at Berlin University of the Arts but flew to North America to study in the School of Visual Arts's MFA Illustration program, majoring in Illustration as a Visual Essay. Her thesis was a reinterpretation of "Little Red Riding Hood", consisting of four mini-books, each of which focuses on a different character from that fairy tale. She graduated with her Master's of Fine Arts degree in 2004, and the book series was added to the U.S. Library of Congress. It would lead to her first professionally-published project, Red Riding Hood Redux in 2009.

While studying in New York, Krug said she began to feel ashamed of her home country because "as soon as you answer someone who asks you where you are from, the association with the Nazi period is there. You are constantly being confronted with it." Although she experienced negative stereotypes towards German cultural identity, she was simultaneously asked questions about her family history she had no knowledge of. Krug later recounted that she "felt a growing urge to tackle my country's history in a new way. I realized that to overcome the collective, abstract shame I had grown into as a German two generations after the war, I needed to go back and ask questions about my family, my hometown." Upon marrying into a Jewish family, she began to properly research and record her family's story during World War II.

== Career ==
Not long after obtaining her Master's Degree, Krug met art director Monte Beauchamp, who invited her to submit work to his annual comics anthology BLAB! (later renamed BLAB WORLD). Krug published three nonfiction comics for the publication that recounted the stories of U.S. Army Sergeant and defector Charles Robert Jenkins, Swiss explorer and writer Isabelle Eberhardt, and Swiss artist Adolf Wölfli.

In the 2000s, Krug was hired as associate professor of Illustration at the Parsons School of Design. She received a 2013 Guggenheim Fellowship and 2014 Sendak Fellowship. She also earned a gold medal from the Society of Illustrators for her book Shadow Atlas, an Encyclopedia of Ghosts.

While approaching her late 30s, Krug returned to Germany to research archives and conduct interviews with her family members on their biographies during and prior to World War II. Krug said she was deeply disturbed to find Nazi propaganda in her uncle's grade school exercise books. Upon further investigation, she also found that her maternal grandfather Willi Rock was a driving instructor in Karlsruhe who became a member of the Nazi Party in 1933. Krug combined her knowledge and research into a graphic memoir titled Belonging: A German Reckons with History and Home (German title: Heimat). She later stated she illustrated and wrote her family story as a way to counteract the negative stereotypes she encountered in New York and inform American readers.

Belonging (which, as a work of non-fiction, is not a "novel") received the 2018 National Book Critics Circle Award in Autobiography, 2019 Schubart-Literaturpreis, Evangelischer Buchpreis, Lynd Ward Graphic Novel Prize, Ludwig Marum Prize, Moira Gemmill Illustrator of the Year Award, and the British Book Design and Production Award for Graphic Novels. In March 2023, the Norman Rockwell Museum in Stockbridge, Massachusetts presented "Nora Krug: Belonging", an exhibition of visual art from the book, which would run through June.

In 2021 Krug Ten Speed Press published a graphic edition of historian Timothy Snyder's On Tyranny Graphic Edition: Twenty Lessons from the Twentieth Century, illustrated by Krug. The book, which is not told in the form of a narrative, but in a way that emphasizes ideas, afforded Krug to approach her art works more conceptually, as she explains, "attempting to add a poetic layer to Snyder's political texts."

In August 2023 Ten Speed's publication of Krug's Diaries of War: Two Visual Accounts From Ukraine And Russia [A Graphic History] was published. This was a collection of Krug's series that ran in the Los Angeles Times, El País in Spain, L'Espresso in Italy, Süddeutsche Zeitung in Germany, and De Volkskrant in Holland. Each installment of the series, which presented accounts of everyday life during wartime, was told through the eyes of two acquaintances of Krug's: a Ukrainian journalist identified as "K', and an anti-war Russian artist, identified as "D".

== Personal life ==
As of early 2023, Krug continues to live in Brooklyn, New York City.
