= Solothurner Literaturpreis =

Swiss literary award

The Solothurner Literaturpreis is a literary award for a literary achievement by a German language writer.

Awarded since 1994, the annual prize is 15,000 Swiss francs. It is named after the city of Solothurn in Switzerland.

== Winners ==
- 1994: Monika Maron
- 1995: Wilhelm Genazino
- 1996: Klaus Merz
- 1997: Christoph Ransmayr
- 1998: Thomas Hürlimann
- 1999: Birgit Vanderbeke
- 2000: Christoph Hein
- 2001: Anna Mitgutsch
- 2002: Erich Hackl
- 2003: Hanna Johansen
- 2004: Barbara Honigmann
- 2005: Kathrin Röggla
- 2006: Matthias Zschokke
- 2007: Peter Weber
- 2008: Jenny Erpenbeck
- 2009: Juli Zeh
- 2010: Ulrike Draesner
- 2011: Peter Bichsel
- 2012: Annette Pehnt
- 2013: Franz Hohler
- 2014: Lukas Bärfuss
- 2015: Thomas Hettche
- 2016: Ruth Schweikert
- 2017: Terézia Mora
- 2018: Peter Stamm
- 2019: Karen Duve
- 2020: Monika Helfer
- 2021: Iris Wolff
- 2022: not awarded
- 2023: Gertrud Leutenegger
- 2024: Anne Weber
- 2025: Alain Claude Sulzer
- 2026: Monika Rinck

== See also ==
- German literature
- List of literary awards
- List of poetry awards
- List of years in literature
- List of years in poetry
