= Michael Kleeberg =

German writer and translator (born 1959)

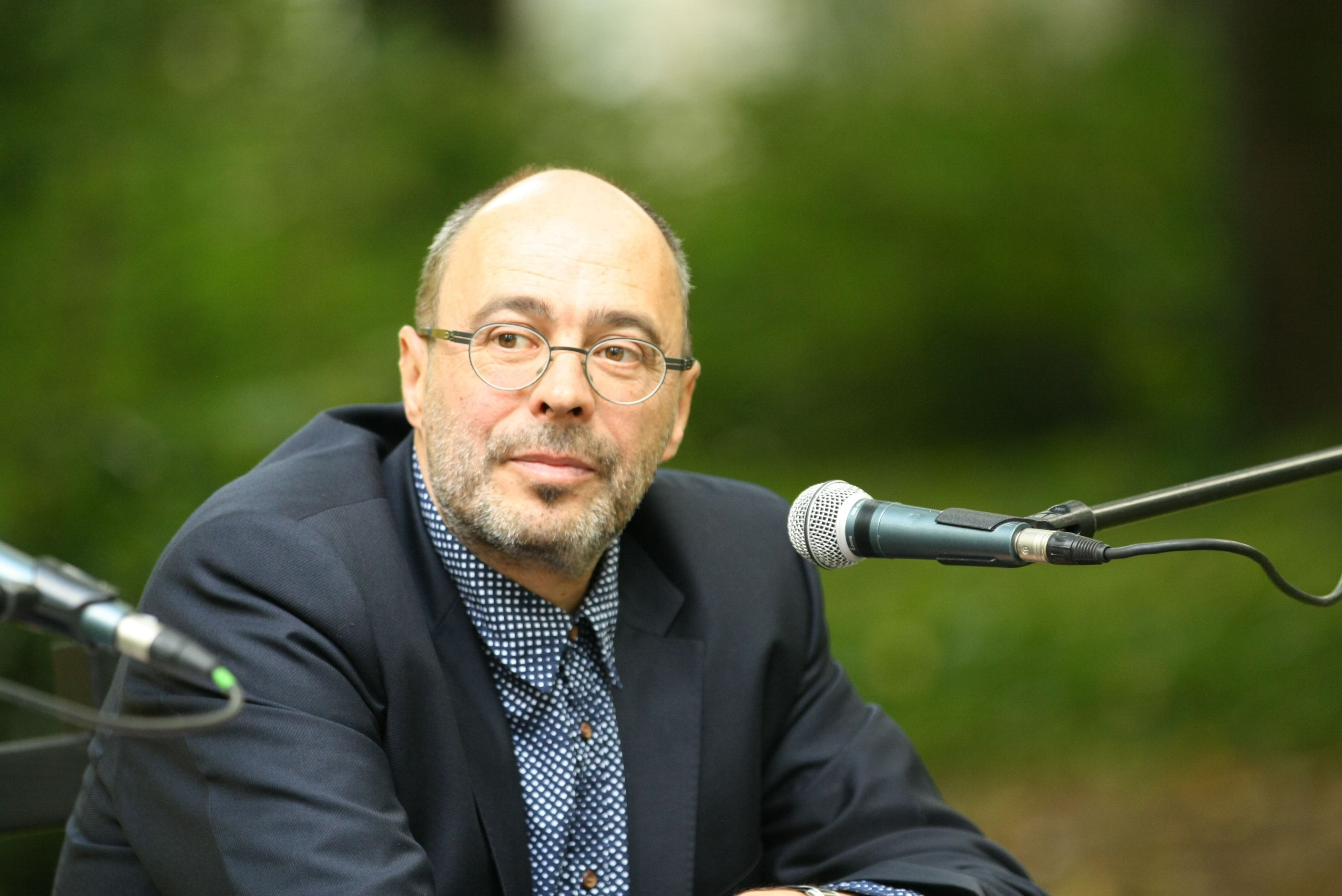
Kleeberg in 2014

Michael Kleeberg (born 24 August 1959 in Stuttgart), is a German writer and translator. He studied political science and modern history at the University of Hamburg and visual communication at the Kunsthochschule Hamburg. He lived in Rome, Berlin, Amsterdam and Paris in the 1980s and 1990s. Since 2000 he lives in Berlin as a full-time writer and translator from English and French.

== Bibliography ==
- Böblinger Brezeln. Munich 1984.
- Der saubere Tod. Munich 1987.
- Proteus der Pilger. Halle 1993.
- Barfuß. Novella. Kiepenheuer & Witsch, Cologne 1995.
- Terror in Normalien. Comedy, Hunzinger Bühnenverlag, Bad Homburg vor der Höhe 1995.
- Der Kommunist vom Montmartre und andere Geschichten. Kiepenheuer und Witsch, Cologne 1997.
- Ein Garten im Norden. Ullstein, Berlin 1998.
- The King of Corsica (Der König von Korsika). Novel. DVA, Stuttgart/ Munich 2001. In English 2007.
- Das Tier, das weint. Libanesisches Reisetagebuch. DVA, Munich 2004.
- Karlmann. btb, Munich 2007.
- Aufgehoben. Kleines Mainzer Brevier. Schmidt, Mainz 2008.
- Das Amerikanische Hospital. Novel. Deutsche Verlags-Anstalt.
- Luca Puck und der Herr der Ratten. Dressler.
- Michael Kleeberg im Gespräch. Wehrhahn, Hannover 2013.
- Vaterjahre. Novel. Deutsche Verlags-Anstalt, Munich 2014.

== Accolades ==
- 1996: Anna Seghers-Preis
- 2000: Lion-Feuchtwanger-Preis
- 2008: Mainzer Stadtschreiber
- 2008: Irmgard-Heilmann-Preis
- 2011: New-York-Stipendium des Deutschen Literaturfonds
- 2011: Evangelischer Buchpreis for Das Amerikanische Hospital
- 2013: Saarländischer Kinder- und Jugendbuchpreis 2012
- 2015: Friedrich-Hölderlin-Preis der Stadt Bad Homburg
