= Kathrin Röggla =

Austrian author and playwright (born 1971)

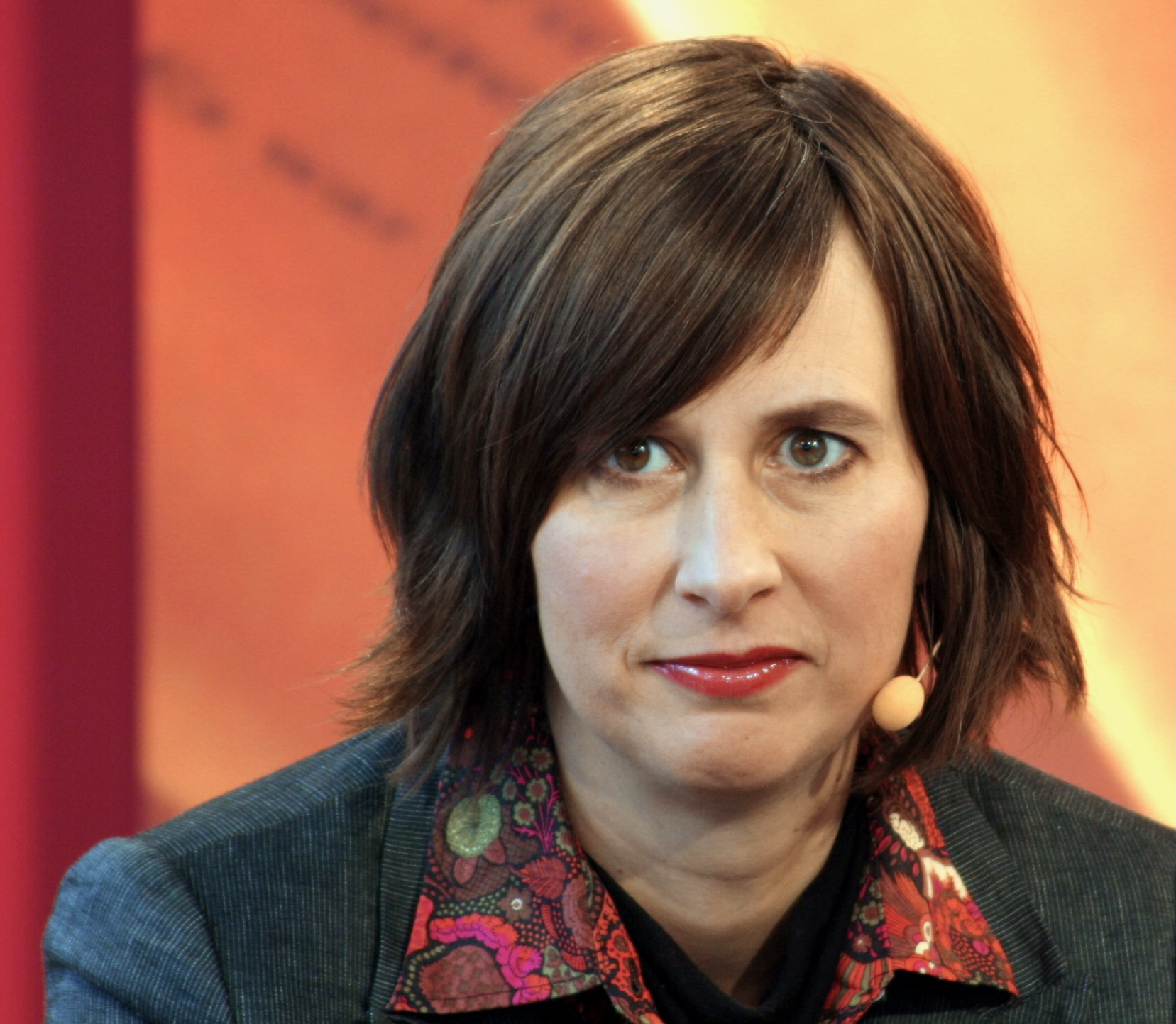
Röggla in 2010

Kathrin Röggla (born 1971) is an Austrian writer, essayist and playwright. She was born in Salzburg, Germany and lived in Berlin from 1992 until moving to Cologne in 2020. She has written numerous prose works, including essays, as well as dramas and radio plays. For her literary works, she has won a wide range of awards.

In May 2012, she was elected a member of the Academy of Arts, Berlin. In November 2015, she also was elected a member of the Deutsche Akademie für Sprache und Dichtung ('German Academy for Language and Literature') in Darmstadt. In 2020, she joined the Academy of Media Arts Cologne.

Röggla is married to the theater director, actor and translator Leopold von Verschuer, and has a son and two daughters.

== Prizes ==
- 1992: Jahresstipendium des Landes Salzburg für Literatur
- 1993: Preis des Internationalen Open-Mike-Festivals Berlin
- 1994: Nachwuchsstipendium für Literatur des Bundesministeriums für Unterricht und Kunst
- 1995: Meta-Merz-Preis
- 1995: Reinhard-Priessnitz-Preis
- 1995: Staatsstipendium des Bundesministeriums für Wissenschaft, Forschung und Kunst
- 1997/1998: Staatsstipendium für Literatur des Bundeskanzleramtes
- 2000: Stipendium Künstlerhaus Edenkoben
- 2000: kolik-Literaturpreis
- 2000: Alexander-Sacher-Masoch-Preis
- 2001: Italo-Svevo-Preis der Hamburger Blue Capital GmbH
- 2001: New York-Stipendium des Deutscher Literaturfonds
- 2004: Förderpreis zum Schiller-Gedächtnispreis und Preis der SWR-Bestenliste
- 2005: Internationale Preis für Kunst und Kultur des Kulturfonds der Stadt Salzburg
- 2005: Bruno-Kreisky-Preis für das politische Buch
- 2005: Solothurner Literaturpreis
- 2008: Anton Wildgans Prize
- 2010: Nestroy Theatre Prize Bestes Stück – Autorenpreis for worst case
- 2010: Franz-Hessel-Preis together with Maylis de Kerangal
- 2012: Mainzer Stadtschreiber
- 2012: Arthur-Schnitzler-Preis
- 2022: Else Lasker-Schüler Dramatist Prize
- 2023: Heinrich-Böll-Preis
- 2023: Großer Kunstpreis des Landes Salzburg
