= Elisabeth Borchers =

German writer and poet

- Born: 27 February 1926; Homberg
- Died: 25 September 2013 (aged 87); Frankfurt am Main

Elisabeth Borchers (27 February 1926 – 25 September 2013) was a German writer and poet.

== Life ==
Borchers was born in Homberg in 1926 and lived during World War II in Alsace. She wrote fiction and poetry and plays. She also wrote for children and translated from French.

Her novel Gedichte (Poems) won the Roswitha von Gandersheim Medal in 1976, an award made to outstanding women writers in German. She worked for publishers until 1998 where she helped the eventual Nobel laureate Wislawa Szymborska.

Borchers died in Frankfurt am Main in 2013.
