= Marie-Luise Scherer =

German writer and journalist (1938–2022)

- Born: 15 October 1938; Saarbrücken, Gau Saar-Palatinate, Germany
- Died: 17 December 2022 (aged 84)
- Occupations: Writer; Journalist

Marie-Luise Scherer (15 October 1938 – 17 December 2022) was a German writer and journalist.

== Biography ==
Scherer began her career as a reporter for the Kölner Stadt-Anzeiger and later wrote for Berliner Morgenpost and Die Zeit. She was a journalist at Der Spiegel from 1974 to 1998, where she became known for her literary reports. More recently, she wrote autobiographical pieces for Sinn und Form, a bimonthly literature journal of the Academy of Arts, Berlin.

In her writing, Scherer wrote a form she characterized as "syllable work", explaining that "two good sentences in one day is a stroke of luck". For more than 20 years, she wrote a maximum of two reports a year for Der Spiegel.

In 2012, Scherer received the Kunstpreis des Saarlandes for literature. Her works have been translated into French, Italian, and Spanish. She lived in Damnatz and died on 17 December 2022, at the age of 84.

== Awards ==
- Theodor Wolff Prize (1970)
- Egon Erwin Kisch Prize for Der Zustand, eine hilflose Person zu sein (1977)
- Egon Erwin Kisch Prize for Auf deutsch gesagt: gestrauchelt (1979)
- Siebenpfeiffer Award (1989)
- Ludwig Börne Prize (1994)
- Italo-Svevo-Preis (2008)
- Heinrich Mann Prize (2011)
- Kunstpreis des Saarlandes (2012)
- Samuel-Bogumil-Linde prize (with Stefan Chwin, 2015)
- Member of the Academy of Arts, Hanseatenweg (2015)

== Works ==
- Ungeheurer Alltag. Geschichten und Reportagen (1988)
- Der Akkordeonspieler. Wahre Geschichten aus vier Jahrzehnten (2004)
- Die Bestie von Paris und andere Geschichten (2012)
- Die Hundegrenze (2013)
- Unter jeder Lampe gab es Tanz (2014)
- Der Akkordeonspieler (2017)
