= Zsuzsanna Gahse =

German author and translator (born 1946)

- Born: Zsuzsanna Vajda; 27 June 1946 (age 80); Budapest, Hungary
- Occupations: Writer, translator
- Writing career
- Language: German
- Period: 1983–present
- Notable awards: Aspekte-Literaturpreis 1983; Adelbert von Chamisso Prize 2006
- Website: zsuzsannagahse.ch

Zsuzsanna Gahse (née Vajda; born 27 June 1946) is a Hungarian-born German-language writer and translator who lives in Switzerland.

== Life and works ==
Gahse is the daughter of Hungarian parents and Hungarian is her mother tongue. Her family fled to the West after the Hungarian Revolution of 1956 and settled in Vienna, where Gahse attended high school and learnt the German language. She began publishing literary works in 1969, and from 1978, encouraged by her mentor Helmut Heißenbüttel, translating works from Hungarian. She has published German translations of works by István Eörsi, Péter Esterházy, Péter Nádas and Zsuzsa Rakovszky, as well as producing a range of essays and fiction under her own name. From 1989 to 1993 she was a lecturer at the University of Tübingen. In 1996, she lectured in poetry at the University of Bamberg.

Today she lives mainly in Müllheim, in the Swiss Canton of Thurgau.

Zsuzsanna Gahse is a member of the PEN Centers in Germany and Switzerland, as well as the authors' association Die Kogge.

In 2019, she has been awarded this year's Swiss Grand Prix Literature for her life's work.

== Prizes and awards ==
- 1983 Aspekte-Literaturpreis
- 1990 Literaturpreis der Stadt Stuttgart
- 1993 City of Zug Prize
- 1999 Tibor-Déry-Preis
- 2004 Bodensee-Literaturpreis
- 2006 Adelbert von Chamisso Prize
- 2009 Chamisso-Poetikdozentur
- 2010 Johann-Heinrich-Voß-Preis für Übersetzung
- 2010 Thurgauer Culture Prize
- 2011 Made a member of the Deutsche Akademie für Sprache und Dichtung, Darmstadt
- 2017 Italo-Svevo-Preis
- 2019 Swiss Grand Prix Literature

== Works ==
- Zero. Munich, 1983
- Berganza. Munich, 1984
- Abendgesellschaft. Munich, 1986
- Liedrige Stücke. Warmbronn, 1987
- Stadt, Land, Fluß. Munich, 1988
- Einfach eben Edenkoben. Klagenfurt, 1990
- Hundertundein Stilleben. Klagenfurt, 1991
- Nachtarbeit. Warmbronn, 1991
- Essig und Öl. Hamburg, 1992
- Übersetzt. Berlin, 1993 (with Renate von Mangoldt)
- Laune. Stuttgart, 1993
- Passepartout. Klagenfurt, 1994
- Kellnerroman. Hamburg, 1996
- Wie geht es dem Text? Hamburg, 1997
- Calgary. Warmbronn, 1999
- Nichts ist wie oder Rosa kehrt nicht zurück. Hamburg, 1999
- Wörter, Wörter, Wörter! Göttingen, 1999 (with Stefana Sabin and Valentin Braitenberg)
- Kaktus haben. Alpnach Dorf, 2000 (with Christoph Rütimann)
- durch und durch. Vienna, 2004
- Instabile Texte. Vienna, 2005 (Volatile Texts: Us Two, translated by Chenxin Jiang, Dalkey Archive Books 2017, ISBN 9781628971361)
- Oh, Roman. Vienna, 2007
- Erzählinseln. Reden für Dresden. Dresden, 2009
- Donauwürfel. Vienna, 2010
- Das Nichts in Venedig. Alpnach Dorf, 2010
- Südsudelbuch. Vienna, 2012
- Die Erbschaft. Vienna, 2013
