= Iris Wolff =

German writer

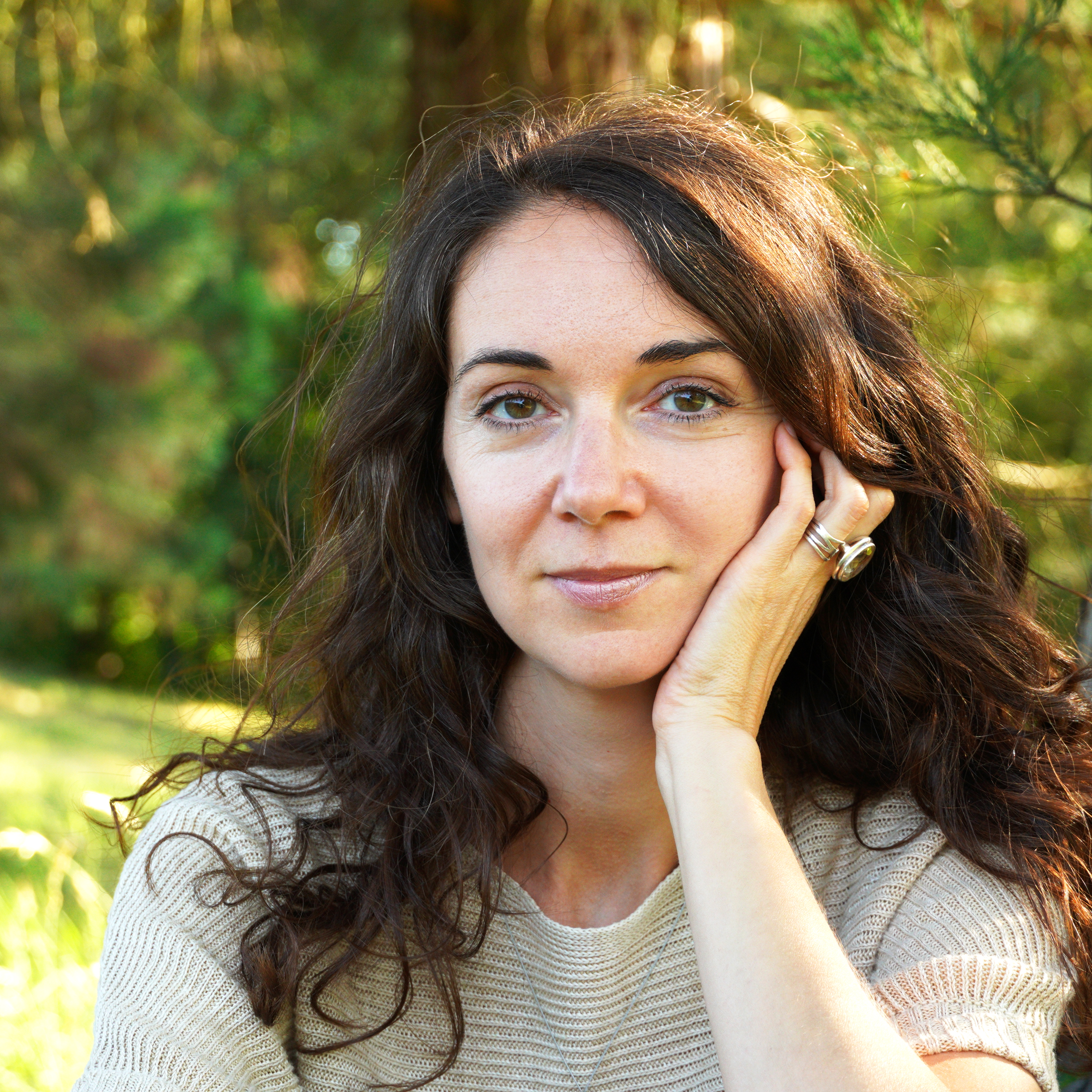
Iris Wolff (2020)

Iris Wolff (born 28 July 1977 as Martina Iris Wolff) is a German writer.

== Life ==
Wolff was born in Sibiu (Hermannstadt), a city in the Transylvania region of what was then the Socialist Republic of Romania. Part of the Transylvanian Saxon community, she is the daughter of a Lutheran pastor, and was raised in Sibiu and in Semlac in Arad County. In 1985, she emigrated with her family to Germany and graduated from secondary school in Stuttgart. Later on, she studied German studies and literature, religious studies as well as graphic arts and painting at the University of Marburg.

From 2003 to 2013, she worked at the German Literature Archive in Marbach and was a lecturer in art education. From November 2013 to March 2018, she was the coordinator of the Netzwerk Kulturelle Bildung (Cultural Education Network) in Freiburg. Since 2018, she has worked as a freelance writer.

Wolff lives with her family in Freiburg im Breisgau.

== Work ==
Wolff writes mostly novels and short stories. In 2012, she published her debut novel Halber Stein (Half a stone), followed by Die Unschärfe der Welt (Blurred [literally:The Blurriness of the World]) in 2020.

Wolff's latest novel Lichtungen (Clearings; 2024) is a love story told backwards about a boy and a girl named Lev and Kato who are living in a small Romanian village. After the end of the Warsaw Pact, Kato's and Lev's paths diverge after Kato is impelled to leave her homeland. She subsequently travels through Europe as a street painter, keeping in touch with Lev by sending him self-drawn postcards. Meanwhile, Lev is left behind, working in a sawmill in his hometown. The turning point in their relationship occurs when Lev receives a postcard asking, "When are you coming?" leading him to visit Kato and travel with her for a while. The novel sheds light on the complicated dynamics of their relationship against the backdrop of a changing Europe and Romanian history. The novel reached number 2 of the Spiegel bestseller list in February 2024 and is currently on the shortlist for the German Book Prize 2024.

== Critical reception ==
Monique Charlesworth of Moth Books states that Wolff's work "has it all. Her books travel in time and across borders, they address the complexity of history using every shade of feeling – and such exciting plots."

Alexandra Roesch finds that "'Clearings' is a beautiful work of literary fiction depicting a lifelong friendship alongside the changes wrought on Romania under Communism and after the fall of the Iron Curtain." She states that "'Clearings' tells a powerful story of enduring friendship. While the novel focuses firmly on a specific period in the history of Central and Eastern Europe, the themes that underpin it have continued relevance today: (national) identity, home and family, migration and what constitutes belonging."

Annemarie Stoltenberg writes about the novel Lichtungen: "With an extraordinary, powerful and delicate imagery, Iris Wolff tells of a childhood and youth in a dictatorship (...). Her text is a gracefully delicate, poetic act of resistance. (Mit außergewöhnlichen, starken und zarten Bildern erzählt Iris Wolff von einer Kindheit und Jugend in einer Diktatur (...). Ihr Text ist ein anmutig zarter, poetischer Widerstandsakt.)"

Cornelia Geißler states in her review: "'Clearings' is the fifth novel by Iris Wolff (...). Her first book was published in 2012, the interest of the public and critics in her writing grew steadily. The most recently published novel, 'Blurred', was celebrated for good reason: the way the author interweaves contemporary history with magical elements, the way she leads her characters across borders is of captivating eloquence. (...) Iris Wolff is also convincing in 'Clearings' due to narrative consistency and the choice of tone. The novel again shows people in European contexts, and the political aspect is even more discreetly addressed this time. ('Lichtungen' ist der fünfte Roman von Iris Wolff (...). 2012 erschien ihr erstes Buch, das Interesse von Publikum und Kritik an ihrem Schreiben wuchs stetig. Der zuletzt veröffentlichte Roman 'Die Unschärfe der Welt' wurde nicht ohne Grund gefeiert: Wie die Autorin darin Zeitgeschichte mit Magischem verwebt, wie sie ihre Figuren über die Grenzen führt, ist von berückender Sprachkraft. (...) Iris Wolff überzeugt auch in 'Lichtungen' durch erzählerische Konsequenz und die Wahl der Tonlage. Der Roman zeigt wiederum Menschen in europäischen Zusammenhängen, das Politische ist diesmal noch dezenter benannt.)"

== Publications (selection) ==
=== Independent publications ===
- Halber Stein. Roman. Otto Müller Verlag, Salzburg 2012, ISBN 978-3-7013-1197-2
- Leuchtende Schatten. Roman. Otto Müller Verlag, Salzburg 2015, ISBN 978-3-7013-1228-3
- So tun, als ob es regnet. Roman in vier Erzählungen. Otto Müller Verlag, Salzburg 2017, ISBN 978-3-7013-1250-4
- Die Unschärfe der Welt. Roman. Klett-Cotta-Verlag, Stuttgart 2020, ISBN 978-3-608-98326-5
- Lichtungen. Roman. Klett-Cotta-Verlag, Stuttgart 2024, ISBN 978-3-608-12285-5

=== Anthologies and literary magazines (selection) ===
- Auf der Breite eines Schermessers. Schillers Arbeit am Piccolomini-Manuskript. In: Unterm Parnass. Das Schiller-Nationalmuseum, Stuttgart 2009.
- Literatur berührt. Kooperationen zwischen Schule und Museum am Beispiel der Marbacher Literaturschule LINA. Lernort Literaturmuseum. Beiträge zur kulturellen Bildung, Göttingen 2011.
- Kinderszenen. Schreiben und Erinnern mit Walter Benjamin. In: Deutschunterricht. Heft 6, 65. Jahrgang 2012.
- Blätterfall. Kurzgeschichte. In: Edition ErLesen. Kunststiftung Baden-Württemberg, Stuttgart 2013.
- Haus mit Himmelsleiter. Kurzgeschichte. In: Spiegelungen. Multikulturelles Banat, Regensburg 2015.
- Langsame Tage. Kurzgeschichte. In: Spiegelungen. Literaturen in Wendezeiten, Regensburg 2015.
- Blätterfall. Kurzgeschichte. Hermannstadt. In: Fakten, Bilder, Worte. Hermannstadt 2017.
- Drachenhaus. Kurzgeschichte. In: Wohnblockblues mit Hirtenflöte. Rumänien neu erzählen. Berlin 2018.
- Ein dritter Raum. Lesereise in Rumänien. In: Literatur & Kritik. Nr. 525 / 626, 2018.
- Grashüpfer im Grenzraum. In: Marbacher Magazin 147.148 LiteraturArchivDerZukunft, Marbach 2021.
- Das Maß innerer Freiheit. In: Hermann Hesse. Eine Hommage in Geschichten, Berlin 2022.
- Fische fangen – Unterwegs in der Sprache. In: "Der Augenblick nennt seinen Namen nicht". Wartburg-Tagebücher: Texte aus dem Wartburg-Experiment, Salzburg 2022.

== Awards ==
- 2013 Scholarship granted by the Arts Foundation Baden-Württemberg
- 2014 Ernst Habermann Prize
- 2018 One-year scholarship for writers granted by the Ministry of Science, Research and Arts Baden-Württemberg
- 2018 Otto Stoessl Prize
- 2018 Alpha Literature Prize for So tun, als ob es regnet (Pretending, that it rains)
- 2019 Residency scholarship granted by the Künstlerhaus Edenkoben
- 2019 Nominated for the Alfred Döblin Prize
- 2019 Scholarship of the Förderkreis deutscher Schriftsteller in Baden-Württemberg
- 2019 Marieluise-Fleißer-Preis
- 2019 Thaddäus-Troll-Preis
- 2020 Scholarship granted by the Reinhold-Schneider-Preis
- 2020 Nominated for the German Book Prize (Longlist)
- 2020 Nominated for the Bavarian Book Prize
- 2020 Nominated for the Wilhelm Raabe Literature Prize
- 2020 Nominated for the favourite book of the independents 2020
- 2021 Marie Luise Kaschnitz Prize for her previous work, especially for Die Unschärfe der Welt
- 2021 Evangelischer Buchpreis for Die Unschärfe der Welt
- 2021 Prize of the LiteraTour Nord for her previous work and especially for the novel Die Unschärfe der Welt
- 2021 Solothurner Literaturpreis for her previous work
- 2021 Eichendorff-Literaturpreis for her previous work
- 2021 Literarischer Landgang – travel scholarship for visiting the Oldenburg Land
- 2021 Scholarship Das Wartburg Experiment
- 2022 Scholarship Zwei Raben – Literatur in Oberhessen
- 2022 Comburg scholarship of Schwäbisch Hall
- 2023 Scholarship granted by the Deutscher Literaturfonds
- 2023 Chamisso Prize/Hellerau
- 2024 Uwe Johnson Prize for Lichtungen
- 2024 Nominated for the German Book Prize (Shortlist)
