= Helga Königsdorf =

East German author and physicist

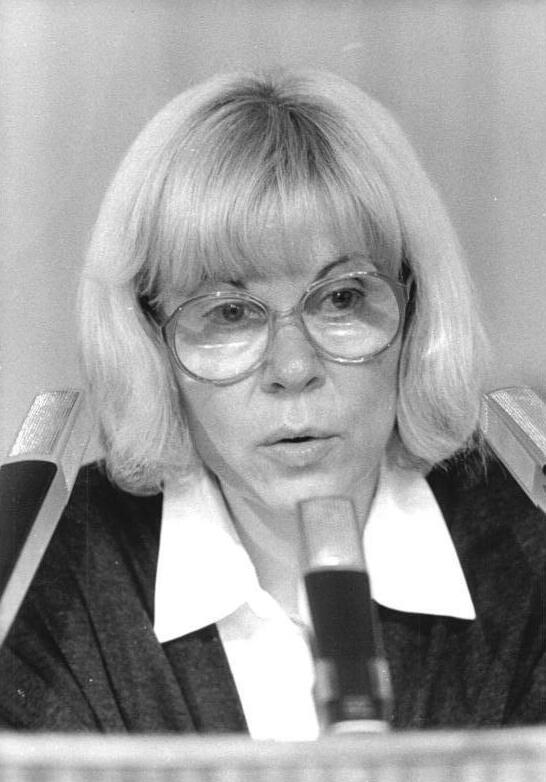
- Königsdorf in 1987
- Born: 13 July 1938; Gera, Saxony, German Reich
- Died: 4 May 2014 (aged 75); Berlin, Germany
- Occupations: Mathematician, author, educator
- Spouse: Olaf Bunke
- Writing career
- Language: German and English
- Genres: Educational, autobiographical, short story
- Subjects: Mathematics, life in the GDR
- Notable awards: Heinrich Mann Prize (1985); Roswitha Prize (1992)

Helga Königsdorf (13 July 1938 – 4 May 2014) was an East German statistician and novelist. She is notable for becoming distinguished in two distinct careers - science and literature. She wrote three books on mathematics, two co-written with her husband Olaf Bunke, who outlived her by seven years, and thirteen literary books of her own. My Indecent Dreams, her first collection of short stories, was published at the age of 40. Fission is her best-known novel. Königsdorf died of Parkinson's disease in 2014 at the age of 75.

== Early life ==
Helga Königsdorf was born a farmer's daughter in Gera, Saxony. After studying physics, she went into academia and married Olaf Bunke, mathematician and statistician of Humboldt University. They wrote several books on statistics together, published in English as part of the Wiley Series on Probability and Statistics.

== Career ==
Known as Professor Helga Bunke, she was appointed as Director of the East Berlin Academy of Sciences of the GDR from 1961 to 1990. She was involved in founding the International Summer Schools on Mathematical Statistics. From 1974, she headed the Department of Probability and Mathematical Statistics.

== Writing ==
At age 40, Königsdorf published her first short-story collection under her maiden name, titled Meine ungehörigen Träume (My Indecent Dreams).

Her writing peers included Christa Wolf, Brigitte Reimann and Maxie Wander, leading feminist writers in the GDR during the 1970s and 1980s.

Much of her writing was autobiographical. In 1990 she left science to devote herself to literature full-time and by this time she was already internationally known as a leading East German writer. Königsdorf lived with Parkinson's disease for more than 30 years.

=== Awards ===
- 1985 Heinrich Mann Prize
- 1992 Roswitha Prize

== Works ==
=== Fiction ===
- Meine ungehörigen Träume (short stories, 1978), Aufbau-Verlag
- Der Lauf der Dinge (short stories, 1982), Aufbau-Verlag
- Respektloser Umgang (short stories, 1986), Aufbau-Verlag
- Lichtverhältnisse (short stories, 1988), Aufbau-Verlag
- Ungelegener Befund (short stories, 1990), Aufbau-Verlag
- Adieu DDR (memoir, 1990)
- Gleich neben Afrika (short stories, 1992), Rowohlt Berlin Verlag
- Im Schatten des Regenbogens (novel, 1993), Aufbau-Verlag
- Über die unverzügliche Rettung der Welt (essays, 1994), Aufbau-Verlag
- Die Entsorgung der Großmutter (novel, 1997), Aufbau-Verlag
- Landschaft in wechselndem Licht (memoir, 2002), Aufbau-Verlag

=== Short stories ===
- Bolero (1978)
- Thunderstorm

=== Math ===
- Helga Bunke: Gewöhnliche Differentialgleichungen mit zufälligen Parametern. Akademie-Verlag, Berlin 1972.
- Olaf Bunke, Helga Bunke (Hrsg.): Statistical methods of model building. Berlin 1986.
- Olaf Bunke, Helga Bunke (Hrsg.): Nonlinear regression, functional relations and robust methods. 2 Bände, New York 1989.

== English translations ==
Few of her fiction works have been translated into English. Fission (Hydra in the original) was published in 2000 by Northwestern University Press, translated by Susan H. Gillespie, director of the Institute for International Liberal education at Bard College.

Three Political Essays and Two Further Essays translated by Brian Keenan in 2013 for the University of Texas at Austin.
