= Terézia Mora =

Hungarian German writer, screenwriter and translator

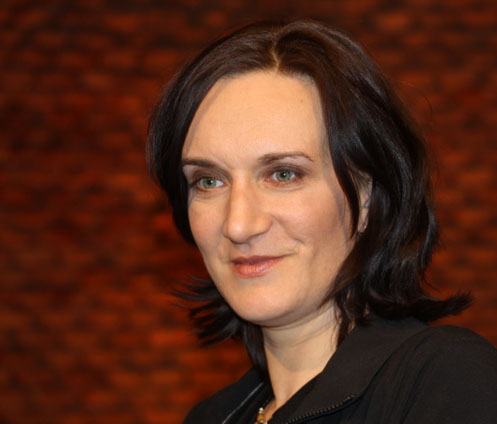
- Terézia Mora (2010)
- Born: 5 February 1971 (age 55); Sopron, Hungary
- Education: Humboldt University; Deutsche Film- und Fernsehakademie Berlin
- Occupations: Screenwriter; Translator; Writer
- Website: Official website

Terézia Mora ([ˈtɛreːziɒ ˈmorɒ]; born 5 February 1971) is a German Hungarian writer, screenwriter and translator.

== Early life and education ==
Terézia Mora was born in Sopron, Hungary, to a family with German roots and grew up bilingual. She moved to Germany after the political changes in Hungary in 1990 in order to study Hungarian studies and drama at the Humboldt University of Berlin. Subsequently, she trained as a screenwriter at the Deutsche Film- und Fernsehakademie Berlin.

== Career ==
She is a member of the German PEN Center and the Deutsche Akademie für Sprache und Dichtung, to which she was elected as a member in 2015.

Since 1990 she has lived in Berlin, working as a freelance writer, writing in German, and as a translator from Hungarian. Among her works, there is a trilogy about an IT specialist, Darius Kopp, and his existential struggle.

Mora is married and has one daughter.

== Awards and honours ==
- 1997: Würth Literature Prize for her screenplay The Ways of Water in Erzincan and the Open-Mike-Literary Prize of the Berliner LiteraturWERKstatt for the tale Durst
- 1999: Ingeborg Bachmann Prize for the narration Der Fall Ophelia (The case of Ophelia), contained in her first volume of stories Seltsame Materie (Strange Matter)
- 2000: Adelbert von Chamisso Prize (promotional prize)
- 2001: Island writer on Sylt
- 2002: Jane Scraberd Prize of the Heinrich Maria Ledig-Rowohlt Foundation for her translation of Péter Esterházy's Harmonia Caelesti
- 2004: Mara Cassens Prize, Prize for the Art Prize of the Academy of Arts (Berlin), Prize of the Leipzig Book Fair for her novel Alle Tage (Category: Fiction)
- 2005: Prize of LiteraTour Nord
- 2005: Ten-week London scholarship from the German Literature Fund, as Writer-in-Residence at Queen Mary University of London
- 2006: Villa Massimo scholarship
- 2006/2007: Tübingen Poetry Lecturer together with Péter Esterházy
- 2007: Franz Nabl Prize
- 2010: Adelbert von Chamisso Prize, Erich Fried Prize
- 2011: Translation Prize of the Kunststiftung NRW for her translation by Péter Esterházy's A production novel (two production novels) from the Hungarian and at the same time for her life's work [5]
- 2011: "Grenzgänger-Scholarship" by the Robert Bosch Foundation for research on The Monster2013: German Book Prize for The Monster
- October 2013: German Book Prize for her novel Das Ungeheuer
- 2013/2014: Frankfurt Poetics Lecturer
- 2017: Bremen Literature Prize for Love Among Aliens
- 2017: Preis der Literaturhäuser
- 2017: Solothurner Literaturpreis
- 2018: Roswitha Prize
- 2018: Georg Büchner Prize, announced on 3 July 2018 by the German Academy for Language and Literature; it's one of Germany's highest literary honors and comes with an award of 50,000 euros.
- 2021: Cross of the Order of Merit of the Federal Republic of Germany
- 2021: Brothers Grimm Poetics Professorship

== Works ==
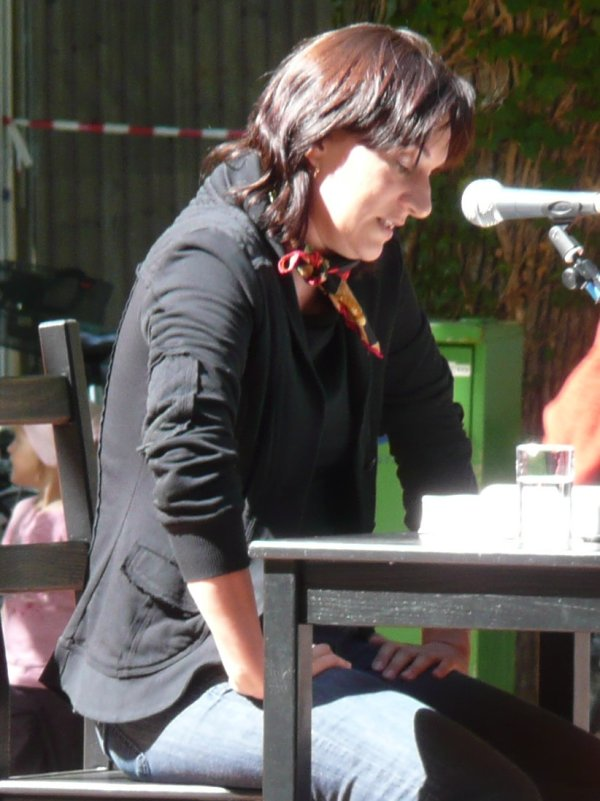
Terézia Mora in 2009.

=== Prose ===
- Strange matter, Rowohlt Verlag, Reinbek 1999, ISBN 978-3-498-04471-8
- Alle Tage, Luchterhand Literaturverlag, Munich 2004, ISBN 978-3-630-87185-1
- The only man on the continent, Luchterhand Literaturverlag, Munich 2009, ISBN 978-3-630-87271-1
- The monster, Luchterhand Literaturverlag, Munich 2013, ISBN 978-3-630-87365-7
- Love among aliens, narratives. Luchterhand Literaturverlag, Munich 2016, ISBN 978-3-630-87319-0
- On the rope (Auf dem Seil), Luchterhand, Munich 2019, ISBN 978-3-630-87497-5
- Fleckenverlauf. Ein Tage- und Arbeitsbuch. Luchterhand, Munich 2021, ISBN 978-3-630-87669-6
- Muna, or Half a Life (Muna oder Die Hälfte des Lebens). Luchterhand, Munich 2023, ISBN 978-3-630-87496-8

=== Poetry lectures ===
- Do not die, Luchterhand Literaturverlag, Munich 2015, ISBN 978-3-630-87451-7
- The secret text. Salzburger Stefan branch Poetikvorlesung, special number publishing house, Vienna 2016, ISBN 978-3-85449-451-5

=== Screenplays ===
- The Ways of Water in Erzincan, feature film, 30 min. (1998)
- Boomtown / End of the City, feature film, 30 min. (1999)
- The Alibi, screenplay for a thriller shown in German TV, 90 min. (2000)

=== Plays ===
- Something like that (2003)

=== Audiobooks ===
- Miss June Ruby (2005)

=== Essays ===
- About the drastic, in: BELLA triste No. 16 (2006)

=== Translations ===
- Als nur die Tiere lebten (2014), translation of Amikor még csak az állatok éltek, (2012), by Zsófia Bán.
- Abendschule – Ein Fibel für Erwachsene (2012), translation of Esti iskola – Olvasókönyv felnőtteknek, (2007), by Zsófia Bán
