= Annette Pehnt =

German writer and literary critic

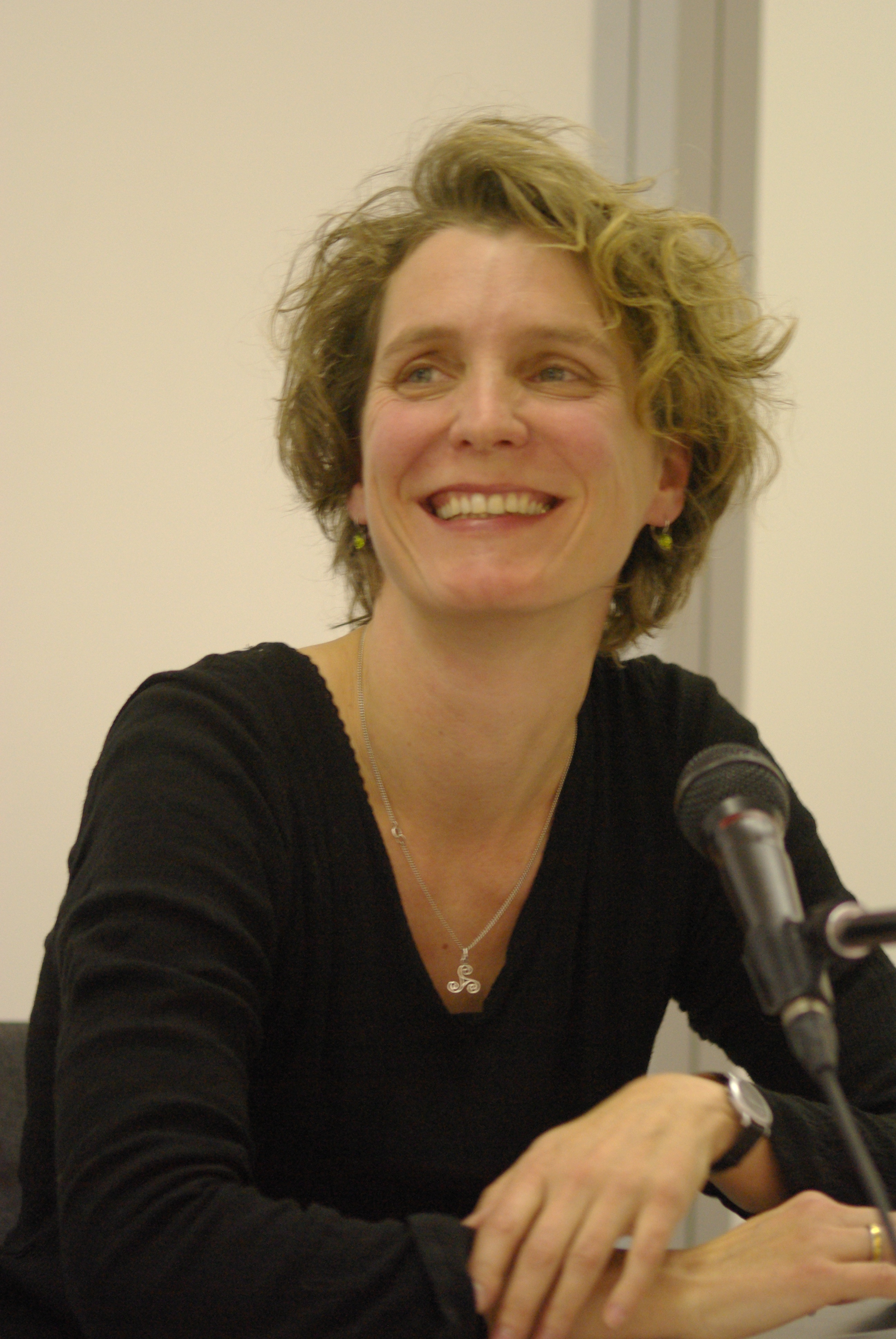
- Annette Pehnt at the 12 Moscow International Fair of Intellectual Books, Non-Fiction 2010
- Born: 1967 (age 58–59); Cologne, Germany
- Occupations: Writer, literary critic
- Writing career
- Language: German
- Notable awards: Thaddäus-Troll-Preis; Italo-Svevo-Preis; Solothurner Literaturpreis; Hermann-Hesse-Preis; Rheingau Literatur Preis

Annette Pehnt (born 1967 in Cologne) is a German writer and literary critic. She lives in Freiburg in Baden-Württemberg.

After graduating from school in 1986 Pehnt performed voluntary social work in Belfast. After a year living in Scotland, she studied English, Celtic studies and German language and literature at the University of Cologne, University of Galway, University of California, Berkeley and University of Freiburg. After her master's degree and the first national examination in 1994, graduation followed in 1997 at the University of Freiburg with a work on Irish literature.

Since 1992 Pehnt, married and mother of three children, has lived as a literature critic and self-employed author in Freiburg and teaches at the University of Hildesheim, where she leads the Institut für Literarisches Schreiben & Literaturwissenschaft.

== Awards ==
- 2001 Mara-Cassens-Preis
- 2002 Preis der Jury des Ingeborg-Bachmann-Wettbewerbs
- 2004 Großes Stipendium des Darmstädter Literaturfonds
- 2008 Thaddäus-Troll-Preis
- 2009 Italo-Svevo-Preis
- 2012 Solothurner Literaturpreis
- 2012 Hermann-Hesse-Preis
- 2017 Kulturpreis Baden-Württemberg
- 2020 Rheingau Literatur Preis
- 2023 Großer Preis des Deutschen Literaturfonds

=== Memberships ===
- PEN Centre Germany

== Works ==
=== Novels ===
- Pehnt, Annette (2020). Alles was Sie sehen ist neu : Roman (in German). München: Piper. ISBN 978-3-492-07010-2. OCLC 1144181087.
- —— (2017). Lexikon der Liebe (in German). München: Piper. ISBN 978-3-492-05720-2. OCLC 1005665529.
- —— (2015). Briefe an Charley : Roman. München: Piper. ISBN 978-3-492-05728-8. OCLC 921884092.
- —— (2012). Chronik der Nähe : Roman (in German). München: Piper. ISBN 978-3-492-05506-2. OCLC 783458557.
- —— (2012). Hier kommt Michelle : ein Campusroman (in German). München: Piper. ISBN 978-3-492-30082-7. OCLC 798986954.
- Pehnt, Annette (2007). Mobbing : Roman (in German). München: Piper. ISBN 978-3-492-05070-8. OCLC 173070866.
- —— (2006). Haus der Schildkröten : Roman (in German). München: Piper. ISBN 3-492-04938-9. OCLC 71336384.
- —— (2004). Insel 34 Roman. München: Piper. ISBN 978-3-492-24336-0. OCLC 231996320.
- —— (2003). Ich muß los : Roman (in German). München: Piper. ISBN 3-492-23609-X. OCLC 174893090.
- —— (1998). John Steinbeck (in German). München: Dt. Taschenbuch-Verlag. ISBN 978-3-423-31010-9. OCLC 237318407.

=== Dissertation ===
- Pehnt, Annette (1999). Mad Sweeney : Aneignung und Transformation eines mittelalterlichen Stoffes in der modernen irischen Literatur (dissertation) (in German). Trier: WVT Wissenschaftlicher Verlag Trier. ISBN 3-88476-352-0. OCLC 45164166.

=== For children ===
Pehnt wrote several children books.

=== Film versions ===
- 2012 Mobbing, director: Nicole Weegmann (TV film, Bayerischer Rundfunk)
