= Hellmut G. Haasis =

German historian, author, and broadcaster

Hellmut G. Haasis (7 January 1942 – 23 February 2024) was a German historian, author, and broadcaster. He is particularly known for his biographies of Georg Elser who attempted to assassinate Adolf Hitler in 1939; Reinhard Heydrich who was one of the main architects of the Holocaust; and Joseph Süß Oppenheimer who was executed in 1738 and in 1940 was the subject of a notorious Nazi antisemitic propaganda film, Jud Süß. Haasis was born in Mühlacker, a town in the Swabia region of Germany, and has written two novels in Swabian dialect as well as a collection of poetry. He is the recipient of the Thaddäus Troll Literature Prize, the Schubart Literature Prize, and the Civis Media Prize.

== Life and career ==
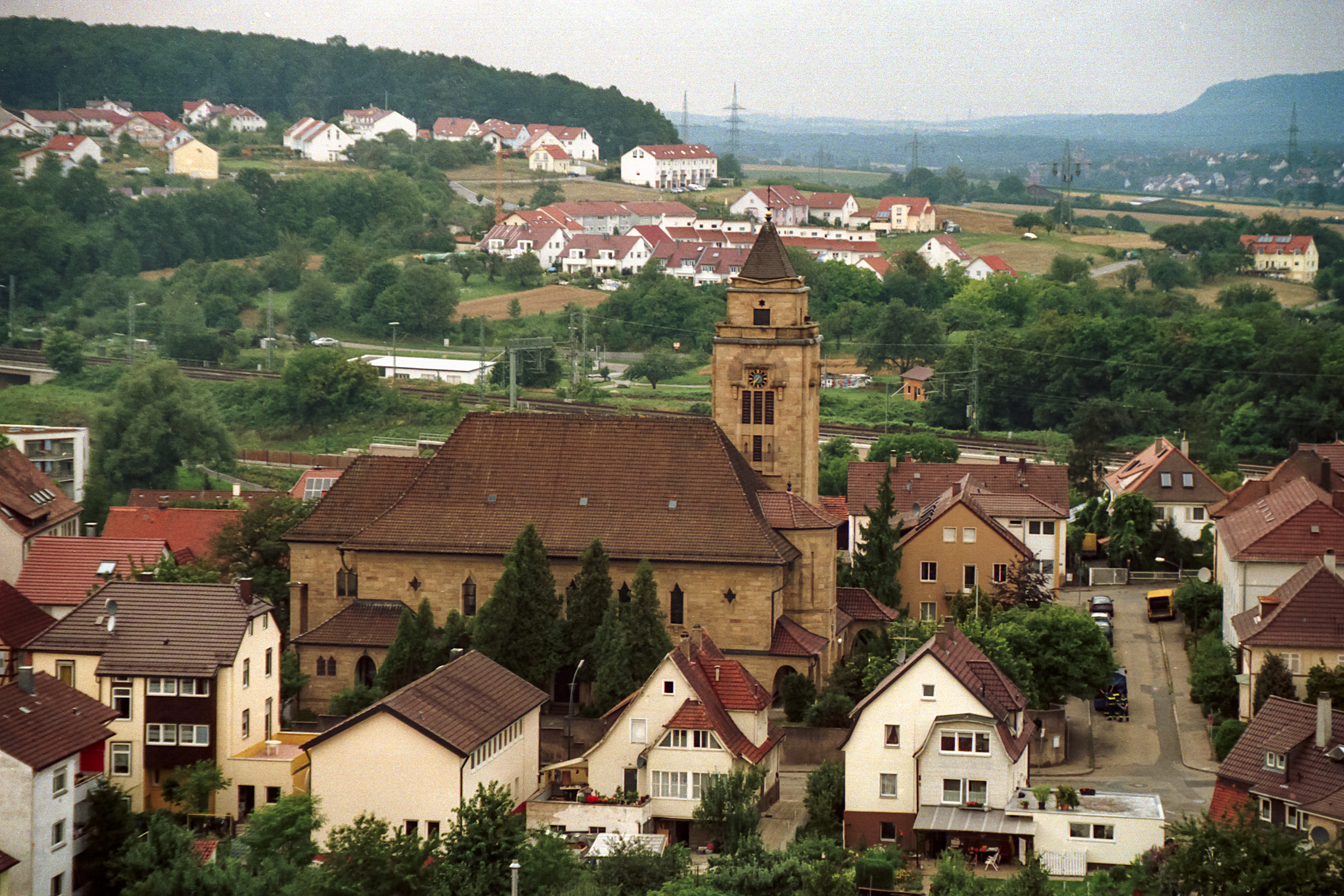
Mühlacker, Germany, the birthplace of Hellmut G. Haasis

Haasis was born in Mühlacker in southwestern Germany in 1942, the youngest of Edwin and Gertrude Haasis's three children. His father was a Protestant pastor who was killed in 1944 during an Allied Forces bombing raid on Strasbourg where he was serving as a purser on German military hospital trains. Initially intending to become a clergyman, Hellmut Haasis studied Protestant theology, history, sociology and political science at universities in Tübingen, Marburg and Bonn from 1961 to 1966. After completing his doctoral thesis under Jürgen Moltmann in 1971, he worked as a political commentator, writer and broadcaster. He also made study trips to Italy during the worker and student unrest there in the 1970s. His observation of a major series of strikes at Fiat's Mirafiori plant led to his 1976 article, "Fiat–Legende und Wirklichkeit" which discussed the company's "reorganization in the name of humanization" as an attempt to destroy its militant work groups. During that period he also travelled to Sardinia where he photographed the island's political graffiti murals. He later published the images as a series of postcards.

A self-described libertarian socialist, Haasis wrote several books during the 1980s on German social and political history. These included Spuren der Besiegten (Traces of the vanquished), a three volume history of popular uprisings and freedom movements in Germany from the peasant revolts during the Thirty Years War to the anti-nuclear movement in the late 20th century. In the mid-1980s he also served briefly on the Reutlingen City Council as a member from the coalition of the German Green Party and the Independents. Haasis's literary breakthrough came in 1989 with the publication of his novel, Em Chrischdian sei Leich (A Christian's corpse). Written in Swabian dialect, the novel went on to win the 1990 Thaddäus Troll Literature Prize. He published a second novel in Swabian in 2008 entitled Heisel Rein der Gscheite Narr (Heisel Rein the clever fool). The book is a fictionalized account of the life of Reinhold Haussler (aka Heisel Rein) who was murdered in 1940 at the Grafeneck Euthanasia Centre. In addition to his novels and non-fiction works, Haasis has published short stories, poems, dramas and radio plays. He also performs (primarily in schools) in the persona of "Märchenclown Druiknui" (Druiknui, the fairy tale clown), the protagonist of a children's book by Haasis published in 2005.

== Awards ==
- Thaddäus Troll Literature Prize (1990) for his novel, Em Chrischdian sei Leich
- Civis Media Prize (1997) for his radio play, Jud Süß. Das Leben und Leiden des Joseph Süß Oppenheimer
- Schubart Literature Prize (1999) for his biography, Joseph Süß Oppenheimer, genannt Jud Süß: Finanzier, Freidenker, Justizopfer

== Selected works ==
- Jetz isch fai gnuag Hai honna. Schwäbische Gedichte (1978), poetry in Swabian dialect. Schwäbische Verlagsgesellschaft
- Spuren der Besiegten (1984), 3 volume history. Rowohlt
  - Vol. 1: Freiheitsbewegungen von den Germanenkämpfen bis zu den Bauernaufständen im Dreißigjährigen Krieg ISBN 3-499-16280-6
  - Vol. 2: Von den Erhebungen gegen den Absolutismus bis zu den republikanischen Freischärlern 1848/49 ISBN 3-499-16281-4
  - Vol. 3: Freiheitsbewegungen vom demokratischen Untergrund nach 1848 bis zu den Atomkraftgegnern ISBN 3-499-16282-2
- Morgenröte der Republik: Die linksrheinischen deutschen Demokraten 1789 – 1849 (1984), history. Ullstein-Verlag. ISBN 3-548-35199-9
- Gebt der Freiheit Flügel. Die Zeit der deutschen Jakobiner 1789–1805 (1988) 2 volume history. Rowohlt ISBN 3-499-18363-3
- Em Chrischdian sei Leich (1989), novel in Swabian dialect. Der Freiheitsbaum. ISBN 3-922589-05-7
- Edelweisspiraten–Erzählungen über eine wilde Jugendbewegung gegen die Nazis (1996), short stories inspired by the Edelweiss Pirates with illustrations by Angela Laich. Trotzdem-Verlag. ISBN 3-922209-61-0
- Joseph Süß Oppenheimer genannt Jud Süß: Finanzier, Freidenker, Justizopfer (1998), biography of Joseph Süß Oppenheimer. Rowohlt. ISBN 3-498-02917-7
- Den Hitler jag' ich in die Luft: Der Attentäter Georg Elser (1999), biography of Georg Elser. Rowohlt. ISBN 3-87134-371-4
  A second edition, revised and expanded by the author was published in 2009 by Edition Nautilus. In 2013, Skyhorse Publishing published an English version of the book, translated by William Odom. It is titled Bombing Hitler: The Story of the Man Who Almost Assassinated the Führer.
- Tod in Prag: Das Attentat auf Reinhard Heydrich (2002), biography of Reinhard Heydrich. Rowohlt. ISBN 3-498-02965-7
- Märchenclown Druiknui (2005), children's book with illustrations by Haasis's daughter Flora and graphic artist Uli Trostowitsch. Der Freiheitsbaum. ISBN 3-922589-30-8
- Heisel Rein der Gscheite Narr (2008), novel in Swabian dialect, with illustrations by Uli Trostowitsch. Der Freiheitsbaum. ISBN 3-922589-32-4
- Volksbuch der verspotteten Päpste. Ein befreiendes Lachbuch (2011), satirical writing on the German pope, Benedict XVI. Der Freiheitsbaum. ISBN 978-3-922589-34-1.
- Totengedenkbuch für Joseph Süß Oppenheimer (2012, memorial book for Joseph Süß Oppenheimer. Worms. ISBN 978-3-936118-85-8.
