= Angelika Klüssendorf =

German writer (born 1958)

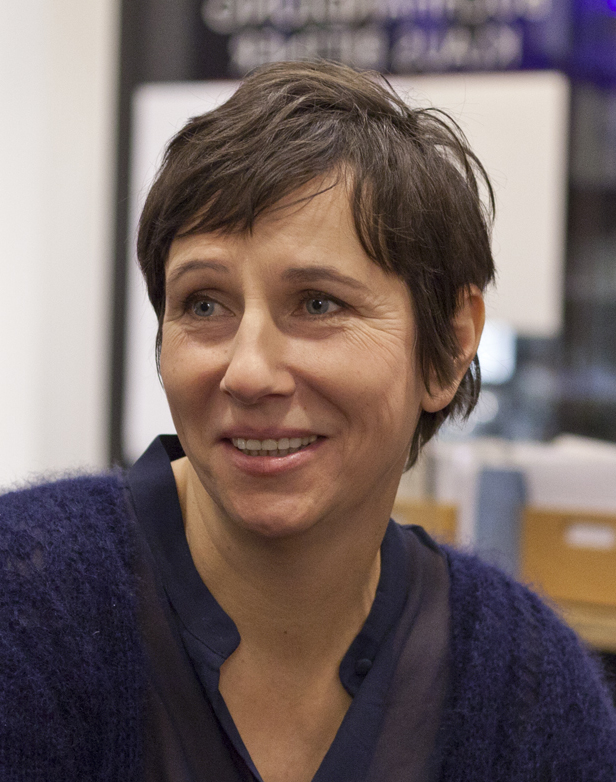
Angelika Klüssendorf

Angelika Klüssendorf (born 1958) is a German writer. She was born in Ahrensburg and raised in Leipzig, both in the German Democratic Republic (former East Germany). In 1985, she fled to West Germany where she has lived ever since.

She has written several books, including plays, novels and short stories. She won the Roswitha Prize in 2004.

Klüssendorf lives in Berlin.

== Works ==
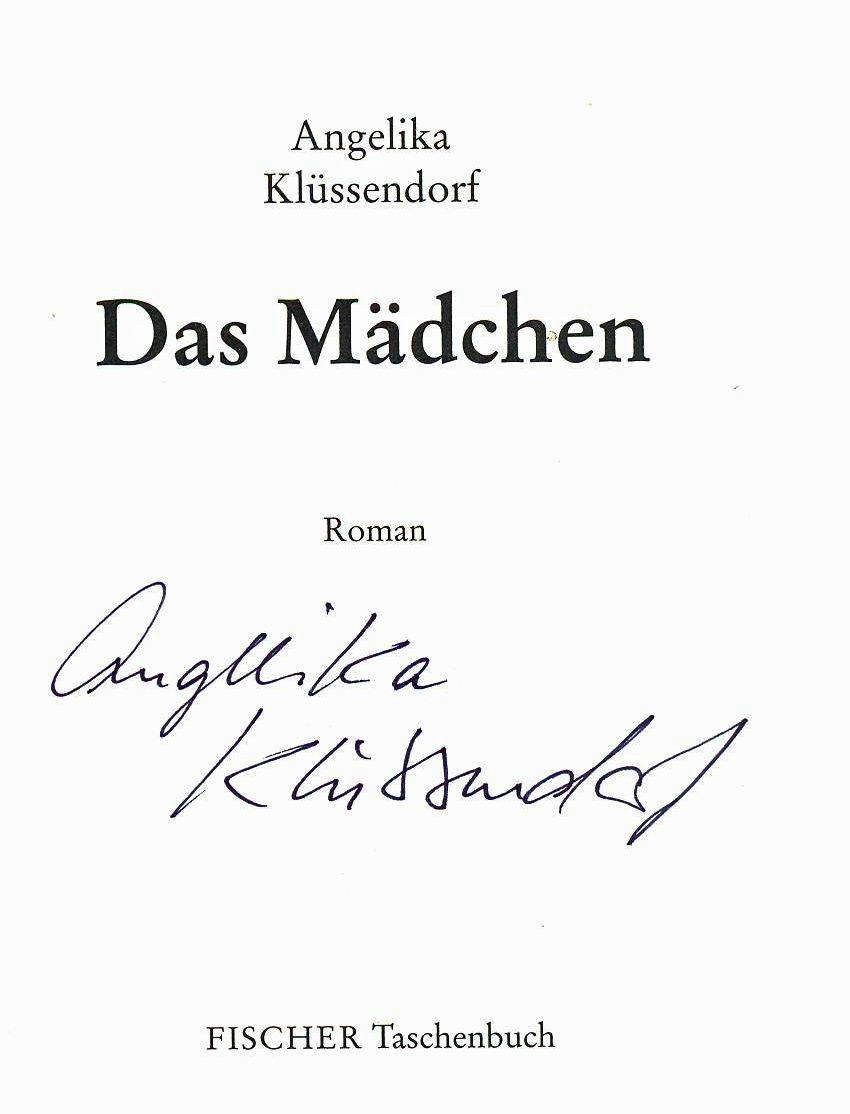
Angelika Klüssendorf autograph 2013 Stadtschreiberfest Bergen

- Sehnsüchte [short story], Hanser, München / Wien 1990, ISBN 978-3-446-15763-7.
- Anfall von Glück [short stories], Hanser, München / Wien 1994, ISBN 978-3-446-17868-7.
- Frag mich nicht, schieß mich tot! A farce, [first] play, printed in: Theater der Zeit Nr. 2 /1996, Berlin 1996 ISSN 0040-5418.
- Alle leben so [novel], Frankfurt am Main 2001, ISBN 978-3-10-038201-6.
- Aus allen Himmeln [short stories], Fischer, Frankfurt am Main 2004, ISBN 978-3-10-038202-3.
- Amateure [short stories], Fischer, Frankfurt am Main 2009, ISBN 978-3-10-038203-0.
- Das Mädchen [novel], Kiepenheuer & Witsch, Köln 2011, ISBN 978-3-462-04284-9
- April [novel], Kiepenheuer & Witsch, Köln 2014, ISBN 978-3-462-04614-4.
- Jahre später [novel], Kiepenheuer & Witsch, Köln 2018, ISBN 978-3-462-04776-9.
- Vierunddreißigster September [novel], Piper, München 2021, ISBN 978-3-492-05990-9.
- Risse [short stories], Piper, München 2023, ISBN 978-3-492-05991-6.
