= Matthias Zschokke =

Swiss writer and filmmaker (born 1954)

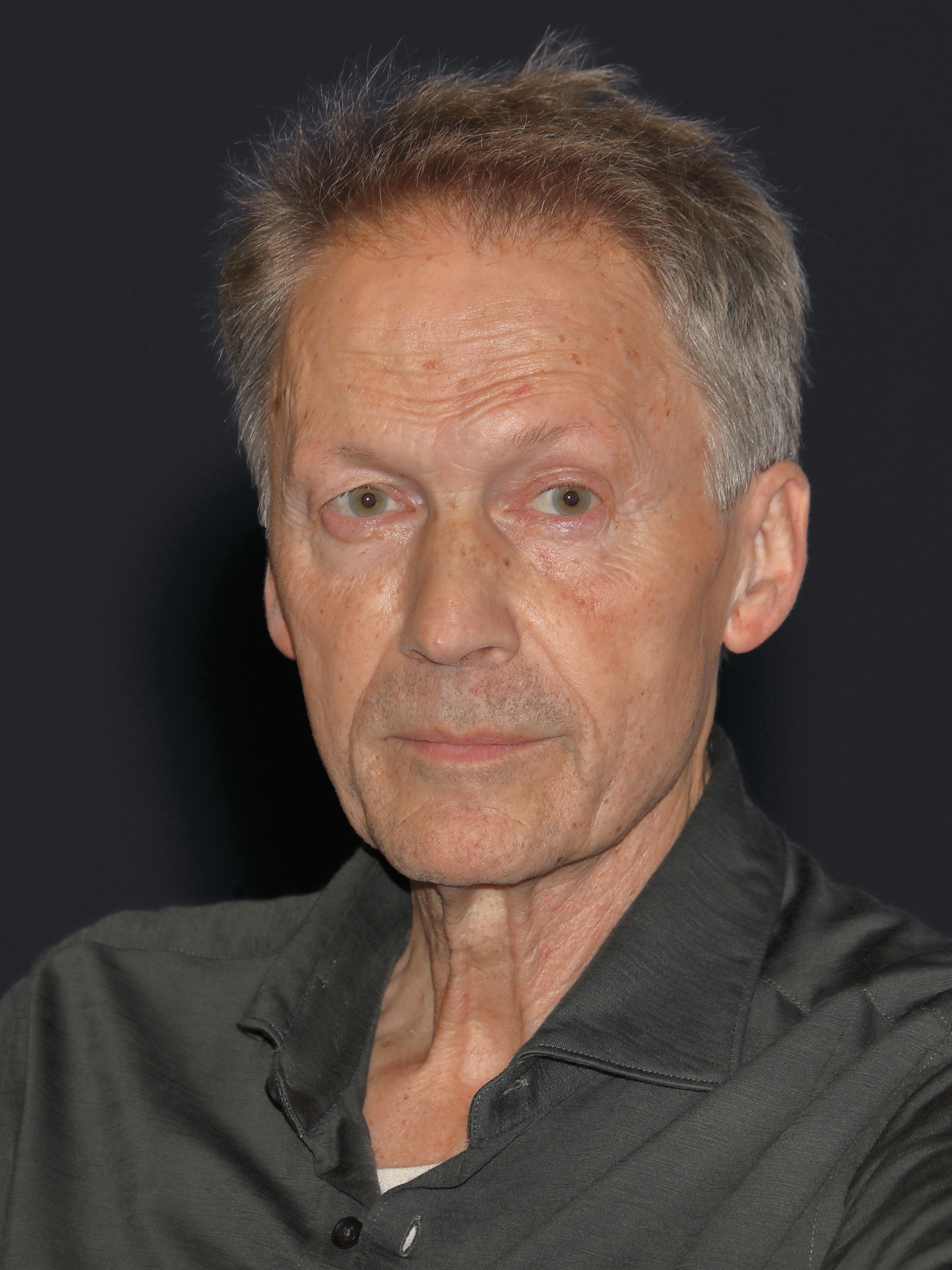
- Born: 29 October 1954 (age 71); Bern, Switzerland
- Occupations: Writer and filmmaker

Matthias Zschokke (29 October 1954 Bern, Switzerland) is a Swiss writer and filmmaker.

== Life ==
He attended drama school at the Schauspielschule Bochum. Since 1980, he has been living as a writer and filmmaker in Berlin.

He has written nine volumes of prose, eight plays, and three films.

== Awards ==
- 1981 Robert Walser Prize of the city and canton of Bern, for Max
- 1983 scholarship from the German Literature Fund
- 1986 Award of the German Film Critics for Best Feature Film Edvige Scimitt
- 1989 election of the Theater Today magazine for the best young playwright
- 1989 Berne Film Award for the movie The Wild Man
- 1991 Award of the Hans-Erich-Nossack price
- 1992 Gerhart Hauptmann Prize for The alphabets
- 1994 Award for The Rich Friend
- 1995 Award of the Goethe Institute for the alphabets
- 1996 Aargauer Literature
- 2000 Literature Prize of the City of Bern
- 2002 Award of the German-language Literature Commission Bern
- 2002 Swiss Schiller Foundation, individual works prize
- 2006 Solothurner Literaturpreis
- 2006 Swiss Schiller Foundation individual works prize
- 2006 Literature Prize of the Canton of Bern
- 2009 Prix Femina Étranger

== Works ==
=== Prose ===
- Max. Roman. München: Ullstein, 1982
- Prinz Hans. Roman. München 1984; Ullstein, 1987, ISBN 978-3-548-20797-1
- ErSieEs. Roman. München 1986
- Piraten. Roman. Frankfurt am Main: Luchterhand Literaturverlag, 1991, ISBN 978-3-630-86752-6
- Der dicke Dichter. Roman. Bruckner & Thünker, Basel/Köln 1995
- Das lose Glück. Roman. Ammann Verlag, Zürich, 1999
- Ein neuer Nachbar. Erzählungen. Ammann, Zürich 2002, ISBN 3-250-60036-9
- Maurice mit Huhn. Roman. Ammann, Zürich 2006, ISBN 3-250-60090-3
  - paperback edition: Fischer, Frankfurt am Main 2008, ISBN 3-596-17689-1
- Auf Reisen. Erzählung. Ammann, Zürich 2008, ISBN 3-250-60127-6
- Lieber Niels. Wallstein, Göttingen 2011, ISBN 978-3-8353-0909-8
- Der Mann mit den zwei Augen. Wallstein, Göttingen 2012, ISBN 978-3-8353-1111-4
- Die strengen Frauen von Rosa Salva. Wallstein, Göttingen 2014, ISBN 978-3-8353-1511-2
- Die Wolken waren groß und weiß und zogen da oben hin. Wallstein, Göttingen 2016, ISBN 978-3-8353-1875-5
- Ein Sommer mit Proust. Wallstein, Göttingen, 2017, ISBN 978-3-8353-3131-0

=== Theatre ===
- Elefanten können nicht in die Luft springen, weil sie zu dick sind – oder wollen sie nicht. Kiepenheuer, Berlin 1983 (UA Berlin 1986)
- Brut. Kiepenheuer, Berlin 1986 (UA Bonn 1988)
- Die Alphabeten. Kiepenheuer, Berlin: Kiepenheuer-Bühnenvertriebs-GmbH, 1990; (UA Bern 1994)
- Der reiche Freund. Kiepenheuer, Berlin 1994 (UA Hannover 1995)
- Die Exzentrischen. Kiepenheuer, Berlin 1997, Gustav Kiepenheuer Bühnenvertriebs-GmbH
- Die Einladung. Kiepenheuer, Berlin: Kiepenheuer Bühnenvertriebs-GmbH, 2000; (UA Genf 2006)
- Die singende Kommissarin. Kiepenheuer, Berlin, Kiepenheuer Bühnenvertriebs-GmbH, 2001; (UA Berlin 2002)
- Raghadan. Kiepenheuer, Berlin 2005 (unaufgeführt)

=== Films ===
- Edvige Scimitt, 1985
- Der wilde Mann, 1988
- Erhöhte Waldbrandgefahr, 1996
