= Nina Jäckle =

German writer and filmmaker (born 1966)

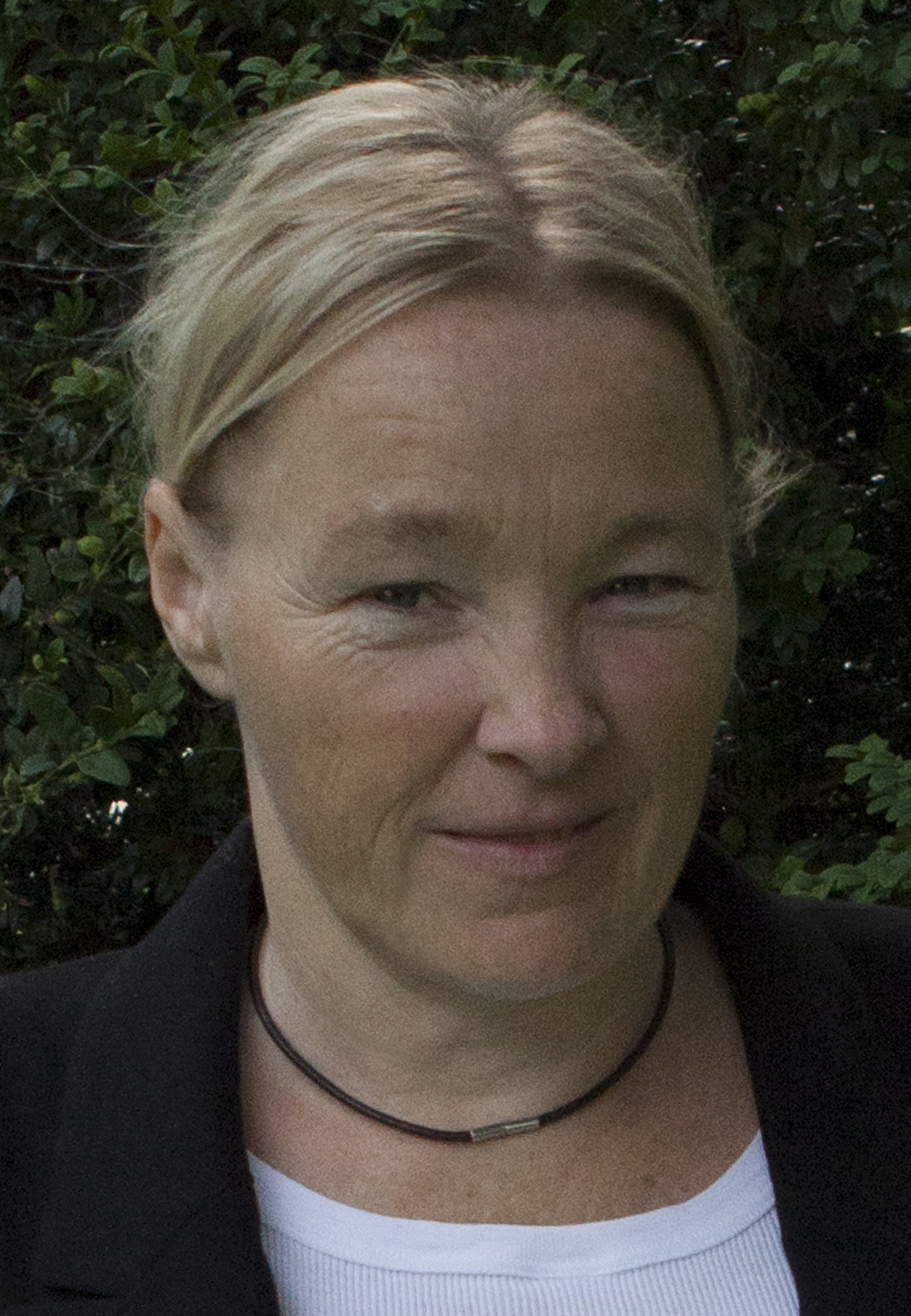
- Nina Jäckle, before 2018
- Born: 20 May 1966 (age 60); Schwenningen, West Germany

Nina Jäckle (born 20 May 1966) is a German writer and filmmaker.

== Life ==
Nina Jäckle was born in Schwenningen in the Black Forest and grew up in Stuttgart. After Mittlere Reife, Jäckle pursued the career goal of becoming a translator for French literature. To this end, she attended language schools in Neuchâtel and Paris. She began writing at the age of 25. Nina Jäckle has written radio plays, and screenplays . Jäckle has been a member of the PEN Center Germany since 2008. In 2011, she was elected to the PEN Executive Committee as an advisor.

== Works ==
- Es gibt solche. Stories. Berlin Verlag, Berlin 2002, ISBN 3-8333-0103-1
- Noll. Novel. Berlin Verlag, Berlin 2004, ISBN 3-8270-0543-4
- Gleich nebenan. Novel. Berlin-Verlag, Berlin 2006, ISBN 3-8270-0654-6
- L'instant choisi. Novel. Editions Autrement, Paris 2008
- Hanne. Radio play. DSR 2006
- Das möblierte Zimmer short film, 2009
- Hanne, play, performance 2009
- Nai, oder was wie so ist, short story, Klöpfer & Meyer, Tübingen 2010
- Sevilla, novel, Berlin Verlag, Berlin 2010
- Zielinski. Roman, Klöpfer & Meyer, Tübingen 2011, ISBN 978-3-86351-002-2. (translated into Spanish, Editorial Serapis, Rosario 2013)
- Einer der Tage, short film 2012
- Der lange Atem, novel, Klöpfer & Meyer, Tübingen 2014, ISBN 978-3863510770
- Warten, short story, Kunststifter Verlag, 2014, ISBN 978-3942795241
- Stillhalten. Novel. Klöpfer & Meyer, Tübingen 2017, ISBN 978-3-86351-451-8.

== Awards ==
- GEDOK Literaturförderpreis (1995)
- Scholarship from the German Literature Fund (2003)
- Literature scholarship from the state of Baden-Württemberg (2004)
- Literature scholarship from the Stiftung Künstlerdorf Schöppingen NRW (2004)
- Karlsruhe Radio Play Prize (2004) for the radio play Auf allen Sendern, stündlich
- Stipendium des Heinrich-Heine-Haus der Stadt Lüneburg (2007)
- Stadtschreiberin Schwaz (2008)
- Burgschreiberin Beeskow 2009
- Literaturstipendium Herrenhaus Edenkoben, 2010
- Stipendium Literaturhaus Aargau, 2012
- Literature scholarship from the Free State of Bavaria, 2012
- Literature scholarship from the Centre national du livre, 2013
- Working scholarship from the German Literature Fund, 2013
- Tukanpreis 2014
- Italo Svevo Prize 2015
- Evangelischer Buchpreis 2015 for the novel Der lange Atem
- 2016/17 scholarship from the German Academy Rome Villa Massimo.

For the short film Das möblierte Zimmer she received:

- the Jury Prize and the Ebensee Bear in Gold, Ebensee Film Festival 2010.
- the Golden Diana and prize for best screenplay, 2010, Filmfestival Klopeiner See.
- AIFF, Best Experimental Film 2010.
- NovaraCinéFestival, best camera, 2010.
