= Stadtschreiber von Bergen =

German literary award

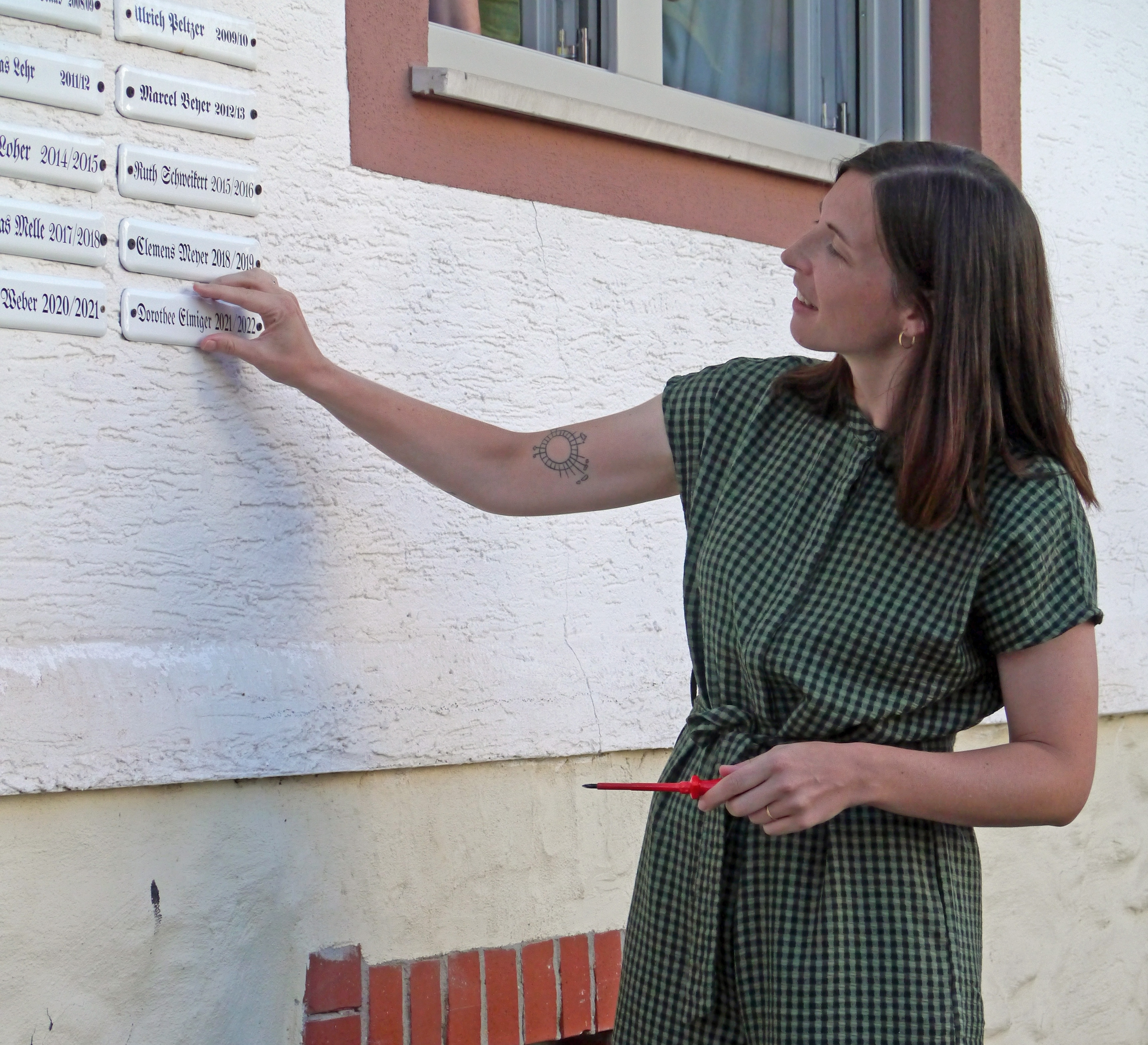
Dorothee Elmiger (Stadtschreiberin 2021/2022)

The Stadtschreiber von Bergen ('City clerk of Bergen') is an annual German literary award. The prize money is €20,000 with one year of free living in the town clerk's house in Bergen-Enkheim, Frankfurt, "An der Oberpforte 4". It was the first Stadtschreiber award in German-speaking countries and established in 1974. The Stadtschreiber has no obligations and can invite writers. A jury with nine members decides the winner.

== Recipients ==
- 1974/1975 Wolfgang Koeppen
- 1975/1976 Karl Krolow
- 1976/1977 Peter Rühmkorf
- 1977/1978 Peter Härtling
- 1978/1979 Nicolas Born
- 1979/1980 Helga M. Novak
- 1980/1981 Dieter Kühn
- 1981/1982 Peter Bichsel
- 1982/1983 Jurek Becker
- 1983/1984 Günter Kunert
- 1984/1985 Friederike Roth
- 1985/1986 Ludwig Fels
- 1986/1987 Gerhard Köpf
- 1987/1988 Ulla Hahn
- 1988/1989 Eva Demski
- 1989/1990 Katja Lange-Müller
- 1990/1991 Heinz Czechowski
- 1991/1992 Robert Gernhardt
- 1992/1993 Ralf Rothmann
- 1993/1994 Paul Nizon
- 1994/1995 Josef Winkler
- 1995/1996 Herta Müller
- 1996/1997 Wilhelm Genazino
- 1997/1998 Jörg Steiner
- 1998/1999 Arnold Stadler
- 1999/2000 Wulf Kirsten
- 2000/2001 Peter Kurzeck
- 2001/2002 Wolfgang Hilbig
- 2002/2003 Uwe Timm
- 2003/2004 Emine Sevgi Özdamar
- 2004/2005 Peter Weber
- 2005/2006 Katharina Hacker
- 2006/2007 Ingomar von Kieseritzky
- 2007/2008 Reinhard Jirgl
- 2008/2009 Friedrich Christian Delius
- 2009/2010 Ulrich Peltzer
- 2010/2011 Thomas Rosenlöcher
- 2011/2012 Thomas Lehr
- 2012/2013 Marcel Beyer
- 2013/2014 Angelika Klüssendorf
- 2014/2015 Dea Loher
- 2015/2016 Ruth Schweikert
- 2016/2017 Sherko Fatah
- 2017/2018 Thomas Melle
- 2018/2019 Clemens Meyer
- 2019/2020 Anja Kampmann
- 2020/2021 Anne Weber
- 2021/2022 Dorothee Elmiger
- 2022/2023 Marion Poschmann
- 2023/2024 Nino Haratischwili
- 2024/2025 Dinçer Güçyeter
- 2025/2026 José F.A. Oliver
- 2026/2027 Judith Kuckart
