= Nichts von euch auf Erden =

2013 novel by Reinhard Jirgl

- Author: Reinhard Jirgl
- Language: German
- Publisher: Carl Hanser Verlag
- Publication date: 25 February 2013
- Publication place: Germany
- Pages: 512
- ISBN: 978-3-446-24127-5

Nichts von euch auf Erden (Nothing from you on Earth) is a 2013 novel by the German writer Reinhard Jirgl. It is set in the 25th century and tells the story of how human settlers on Mars return to Earth in an aggressive manner.

== Reception ==
Hubert Winkels of Die Zeit placed the novel within an ongoing trend of dystopian science fiction in German literature, represented by authors such as Georg Klein, Ernst-Wilhelm Händler, Benjamin Stein and Juli Zeh. He described the language in Jirgl's book as "a kind of hallucinogenic-holographic reality installation".

The book was shortlisted for the 2013 German Book Prize.

== Adaptation ==
A stage adaptation by Felix Rothenhäusler premiered at the Munich Kammerspiele in 2015.
