= The Unfinished =

2003 novel by Reinhard Jirgl

- Title page for German language edition titled, Die Unvollendeten (2003)
- Author: Reinhard Jirgl
- Original title: Die Unvollendeten
- Translator: Iain Galbraith
- Language: German
- Publisher: Carl Hanser Verlag
- Publication date: 2003
- Publication place: Germany
- English publication date: April 2020
- Pages: 256
- ISBN: 3446202714

The Unfinished (German: Die Unvollendeten) is a 2003 novel by the German writer Reinhard Jirgl.

== Plot ==
The novel is about the expulsion of the Sudeten Germans and follows a German family during three periods: during the expulsion directly after World War II, when the surviving women live in the Soviet occupation zone in Germany but retain hope of one day returning, and years later when the son of the youngest woman undergoes cancer treatment in Berlin and writes down his family's history. The characters are inspired by Jirgl's own family.

== Reception ==
Jirgl received the 2003 Rheingau Literatur Preis for his collected works and in particular The Unfinished.
