= Hermann Lenz =

German writer

- Born: 26 February 1913; Stuttgart, Germany
- Died: 12 May 1998 (aged 85); Munich, Germany
- Occupation: Writer

Hermann Karl Lenz (26 February 1913 – 12 May 1998) was a German writer of poetry, stories, and novels. A major part of his work is a series of nine semi-autobiographical novels centring on his alter ego "Eugen Rapp", a cycle that is also known as the Schwäbische Chronik ("Swabian Chronicle").

Lenz had been a German POW in U.S. custody during World War II. He received over 15 literary awards. Archives of his writings include some letters exchanged with his fellow writers Paul Celan and Peter Handke and others (see below: "Correspondence").

== Life and work ==
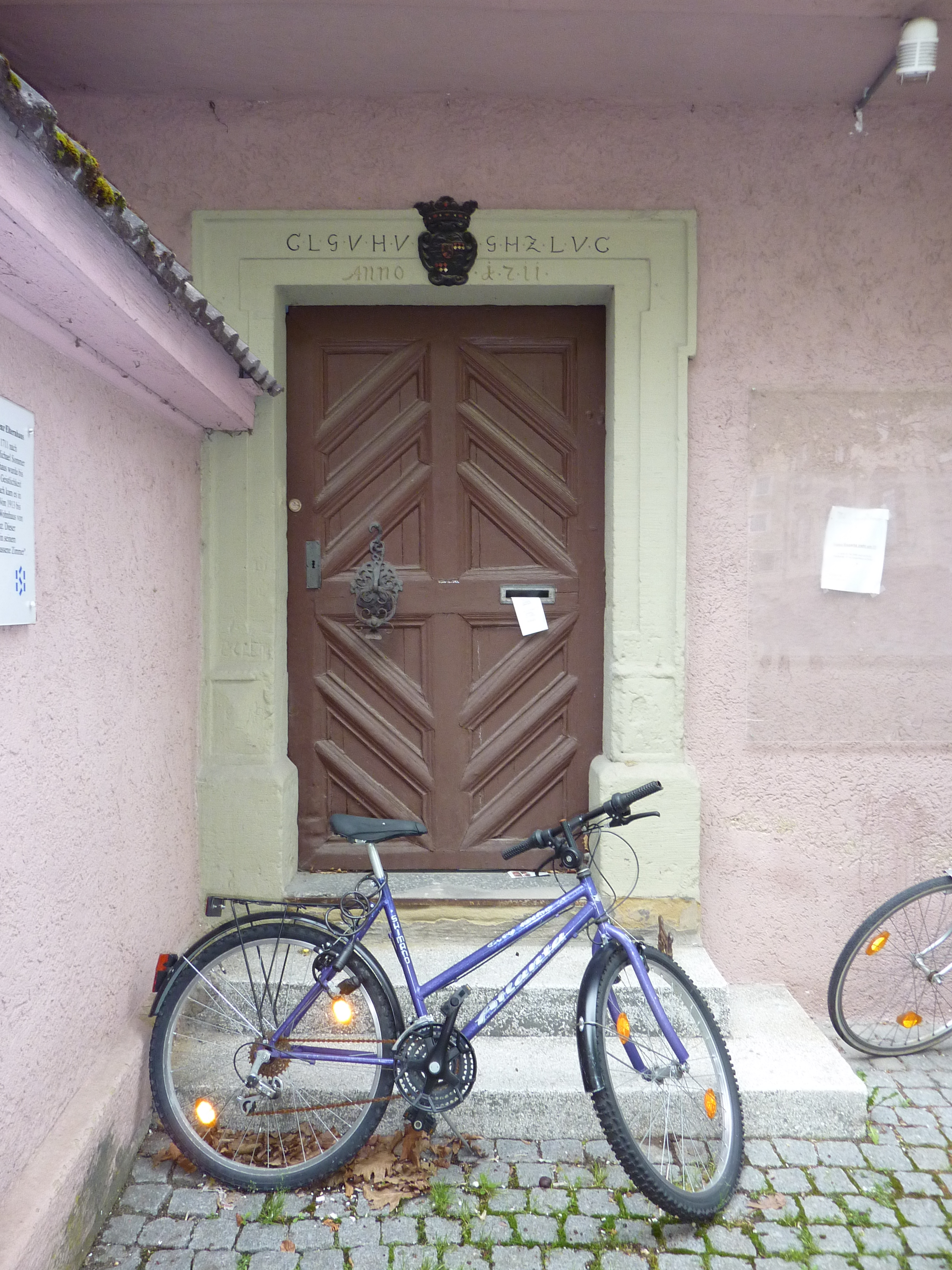
The front door of Lenz' later home in Künzelsau

Lenz, son of art teacher Hermann Friedrich Lenz and his wife Elise, grew up until his eleventh year in Künzelsau and then in Stuttgart. After graduation and failed theology studies in Tübingen, he began, in 1933, to study Art history, philosophy, Archaeology and Germanic studies in Heidelberg and to study from 1937 in Munich. After early dramatic reading impressions (Mörike, Stifter, Schnitzler, Hofmannsthal and others), Lenz first wrote poems and prose pieces. He first appeared in 1936, mediated by Georg von der Vring, with the poetry collection Gedichte, his first publication, which was followed before the war, with the repeatedly revised narrative Das stille Haus ("The Silent House").

From 1940, Lenz was a soldier in France and Russia, and in 1946 prisoner of war in the United States. Those experiences, that made the student and soldier, influenced his entire literary output. From the start in opposition to Nazism, Lenz moved back into inner worlds – the Biedermeier or the Vienna Fin de siècle – the scene of many narrative texts and the object of reflections in countless character monologues. After returning from captivity, Lenz was dedicated, except for secretary work in cultural institutions, just to write. In 1946 he married the art historian Hanne Trautwein, whom he had met in 1937. By 1975, both lived in Stuttgart, at Lenz' home, but inheritance disputes forced a move to Munich, home of his wife.

In the midpoint of his work is a nine-volume autobiographical novel cycle about the alter-ego figure "Eugen Rapp", which began with Verlassene Zimmer [The Abandoned Room] (1966) and concluded with Freunde [Friends] (1997). Almost without parallel in the German publications of 1945, this novel explores autobiographical events, and both cuts and captures the political history of Germany in the 20th century. Just as notable are the novels Andere Tage [Other Days] (1968) and Neue Zeit [New Age] (1975), of the daily confrontation with the Third Reich. Lenz comes from an autobiographical concept ("Write as you are," is one of the central maxims). It strives to accurately depict life in the details of a metaphysical background to indicate "flow into each other past and present". In books like Lady and Executioner (1973) and Der Wanderer (1986) Lenz succeeded, again and again, with the autobiographical and merge of the transcendental component of his writing. As the most prominent stylistic device he uses here the form of "internal dialogue", which makes the character perspective transparent and transferred to the reflections of the outside world directly into sensations. In addition to his novels, and Rapp occasionally published poetry submitted by Lenz, a large number of novels and short stories. These delve, like Die Begegnung [The Encounter] (1979) and Memory of Edward (1981), into the 19th century world, or they design, as in the 1980 completed trilogy Der Innere Bezirk [The Inner District], conscious alternative plans for their own biography. Lenz occasionally followed narrative traditions, especially with The Double Face (1949) or Spiegelhütte ("Mirror Cabins") (1962), building on forms of magic realism.

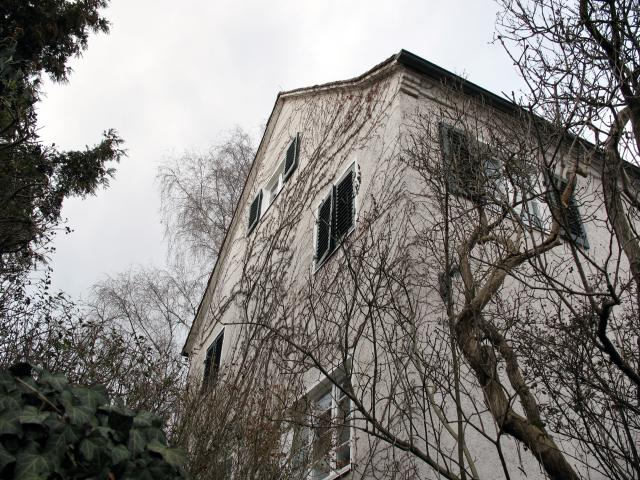
Hermann Lenz's house in Stuttgart

Lenz has been for many years little attention until then but stopped recognition and fame. Peter Handke helped him break through in 1973. Lenz published during 1936–1997 more than 30 books. "Ich bin eben ein schwäbischer Dickschädel" ("I'm just a Swabian mule-head"), said Hermann Lenz on his 85th birthday, 26 February 1998, shortly before his death in May of that year.

Hermann Lenz had a reading in October 1951 before the Gruppe 47, at the Laufenmühle, a place near Ulm, from an earlier version of the novel Nachmittag einer Dame ("Afternoon of a Lady"), the first part of Der innere Bezirk ("The Inner District"). His detached attitude to the group coincides with Paul Celan, who had read a year later in Niendorf. The experience went into the novel Ein Fremdling ("A Stranger").

== Influences ==
- In 1993, Lenz established a foundation to support young writers and literary scholars.
- After his death in 1998, from the traditional Petrarch Prize a Hermann-Lenz-Preis was founded, an annual gathering of friends of literature and poetry from 1999 to 2009, sponsored by Hubert Burda.
- Protagonist of his novel work is Eugen Rapp, which he himself described as "popular edition of the writer Hermann Lenz" and his nine-part Swabian Chronicle with him at the center. As with Eugen Rapp, the other characters in his novels are no "heroes", but often ordinary people, which are distinguished by their special humanity. So his book is also fascinated by less dramatic actions than by the content and effect of figurative language.

== Works ==
=== Stories ===
- Das stille Haus [The Still House] – Erzählung. Stuttgart: Dt. Verlags-Anst. 1947. (Erzähler von morgen; Bd. 1)
- Das doppelte Gesicht [The Double Face] – drei Erzählungen. Stuttgart: Dt. Verl.-Anst., 1949.
- Die Abenteurerin – Erzählung. Stuttgart: Dt. Verl.-Anst., 1952. (Die Stern-Ausgaben)
- Nachmittag einer Dame [Afternoon of a Lady]. Neuwied [u. a.]: Luchterhand, 1961.
- Dame und Scharfrichter [Lady and Executioner] – Erzählung. Köln: Hegner, 1973.
- Der Tintenfisch in der Garage [The Squid in the Garage] – Erzählung. Frankfurt am Main: Insel 1977.
- Erinnerung an Eduard [Memory of Edward] – Erzählung. Frankfurt/M.: Insel-Verl., 1981.
- Der Letzte [The Last] – Erzählung. Frankfurt a.M., Suhrkamp, 1984. (Bibliothek Suhrkamp; 851).
- Der Käfer und andere Geschichten [The Beetle and Other Stories]. Passau: Refugium Verlag 1989 (Reihe Refugium; 3)
- Jung und alt [Young and Old] – Erzählung. Frankfurt am Main: Insel 1989.
- Hotel Memoria – Erzählungen. Frankfurt am Main, Insel 1990. (Insel-Bücherei; 1115)
- Schwarze Kutschen [Black Coaches] – Erzählung. Frankfurt am Main: Insel 1990.
- Jugendtage [Youth Days] – Erzählung. Passau, Reche, 1993. (Reihe Refugium; 14)
- Zwei Frauen [Two Women] – Erzählung. Frankfurt am Main: Insel 1994.
- Feriengäste [Holiday Guests] – Erzählungen. Epilogue by Peter Hamm. Regensburg – Mittelbayerische Dr.- & Verl.-Ges., 1997.
- Die Schlangen haben samstags frei [The snakes have Saturdays off] – Erzählungen. Hrsg. und mit einem Nachwort versehen von Rainer Moritz. Frankfurt am Main: Insel 2002.

=== Novels ===
- Der russische Regenbogen [The Russian Rainbow] – novel. Darmstadt [u. a.]: Luchterhand 1959.
- Spiegelhütte [Mirror Cabins]. Köln [u. a.] – Hegner 1962.
- Die Augen eines Dieners [The Eyes of a Servant] – novel. Köln, Olten: Hegner 1964.
- Im inneren Bezirk [In the Inner District] – novel. Köln [u. a.]: Hegner 1970.
- Der Kutscher und der Wappenmaler [The Driver and the Sign Painter] – novel. Köln: Hegner, 1972.
- Die Begegnung [The Encounter] – novel. Frankfurt am Main – Insel 1979.
- Der innere Bezirk [The Inner District] – novel in 3 books [Nachmittag einer Dame – Im inneren Bezirk – Constantinsallee]. Frankfurt am Main, Insel 1980.

=== The Eugen-Rapp novels ===
The combined under the collective title "Vergangene Gegenwart" are autobiographical novels:

1. Verlassene Zimmer [Abandoned Room] – novel. Köln und Olten: Hegner 1966.
2. Andere Tage [Other Days] – novel. Köln und Olten, Hegner 1968.
3. Neue Zeit [New Age] – novel. Frankfurt a. M., Insel 1975.
4. Tagebuch vom Überleben und Leben [Diary of Afterlife and Life] – novel. Frankfurt a. Main, Insel 1978.
5. Ein Fremdling [A Stranger] – novel. Frankfurt a. M., Insel 1983.
6. Der Wanderer [The Wanderer] – novel. Frankfurt a. Main, Insel 1986.
7. Seltsamer Abschied [Farewell] – novel. Frankfurt a. Main, Insel 1988.
8. Herbstlicht [Autumn Light] – novel. Frankfurt a. Main und Leipzig, Insel 1992.
9. Freunde [Friends] – novel. Frankfurt a. Main und Leipzig, Insel 1997.

=== Poetry ===
- Gedichte [Poems]. Hamburg: Blätter für die Dichtung 1936. (Die Jungen; 9)
- Zeitlebens [Lifelong]: Poems 1934–1980. München, Schneekluth 1981. (Münchner Edition)
- Zu Fuss [On Foot]: Poems. Warmbronn: Keicher 1987. (Roter Faden; 9)
- Vielleicht lebst du weiter im Stein [Maybe you live more in stone]. poems. Selected and with an afterword by Michael Krüger. Frankfurt am Main: Suhrkamp 2003 (Bibliothek Suhrkamp. 1371).

=== Correspondence ===
- Paul Celan, Hanne und Hermann Lenz: Briefwechsel. With 3 letters of Gisèle Celan-Lestrange. Hrsg. von Barbara Wiedemann (and others). Frankfurt am Main: Suhrkamp 2001.
- Peter Handke, Hermann Lenz: Berichterstatter des Tages [Rapporteur of Days]. correspondence, Frankfurt am Main: Insel Verlag 2006.
- Hermann Lenz – Rainer Malkowski: Als gingen wir ein Stück zusammen [As we walked a bit together]. correspondence 1991–1998. Contributed by Renate von Doemming. Warmbronn: Verlag Ulrich Keicher 2007.

=== Others ===
- Leben und Schreiben [Living and Writing]. Frankfurter Vorlesungen, Frankfurt am Main: Suhrkamp 1986
- Hermann Lenz, Bilder aus meinem Album [Pictures from my album], Frankfurt am Main: Insel Verlag 1987.
- Im Hohenloher Land. Mit 38 Fotos von Karlheinz Jardner. In Zusammenarbeit mit dem ZDF. Freiburg i. Brsg.: Eulen-Verl., 1989. (Reihe "Ganz persönlich")
- Stuttgart. Porträt einer Stadt [Portrait of a City]. Frankfurt am Main: Suhrkamp 2003 (zuerst Belser Verlag, Stuttgart und Zürich, 1983).
- Hermann Lenz zum 80. Geburtstag [~ on His 80th Birthday]. Festschrift, herausgegeben von Thomas Reche und Hans Dieter Schäfer. Passau: Verlag Thomas Reche 1993.

== Awards ==
- 1962 Ostdeutscher Literaturpreis
- 1978 Georg Büchner Prize
- 1981 Franz Nabl Prize
- 1981 Wilhelm-Raabe-Preis
- 1983 Gottfried-Keller-Preis
- 1983 Verdienstmedaille des Landes Baden-Württemberg
- 1984 Großes Bundesverdienstkreuz
- 1986 Österreichisches Ehrenkreuz für Wissenschaft und Kunst
- 1987 Petrarca-Preis
- 1991 Bayerischer Literaturpreis
- 1991 Jean-Paul-Preis
- 1993 München leuchtet-Medaille
- 1993 Bayerischer Maximiliansorden für Wissenschaft und Kunst
- 1995 Literaturpreis der Stadt München
- 1997 Würth-Preis für Europäische Literatur
