= Literaturpreis der Stadt München =

Bavarian literary award

Literaturpreis der Stadt München is a Bavarian literary prize. The prize money is €10,000.

== Winners ==
- 1928 Hans Carossa
- 1929 Willy Seidel
- 1930 Hans Brandenburg
- 1931 Josef Magnus Wehner
- 1932 Ruth Schaumann
- 1933 Hans Zöberlein
- 1935 Georg Britting
- 1936 Ludwig Friedrich Barthel
- 1937 Alfons von Czibulka
- 1938 Josef Ponten
- 1945 Peter Dörfler
- 1947 Gertrud von le Fort
- 1948 Ernst Penzoldt
- 1949 Georg Schwarz
- 1950 Annette Kolb
- 1951 Gottfried Kölwel
- 1952 Eugen Roth
- 1953 Mechtilde Lichnowsky
- 1954 Wilhelm Hausenstein
- 1955 Erich Kästner
- 1957 Lion Feuchtwanger
- 1958 Reiner Zimnik
- 1962 Herbert Schneider
- 1963 Hellmut von Cube
- 1964 Tankred Dorst
- 1973 Philipp Arp
- 1975 Janosch
- 1980 Mathias Schröder
- 1986 Said
- 1989 Uwe Timm
- 1990 Gert Heidenreich
- 1991 Carl Amery
- 1993 Gert Hofmann
- 1995 Hermann Lenz
- 1997 Günter Herburger
- 1999 Ernst Augustin
- 2002 Uwe Timm
- 2005 Herbert Rosendorfer
- 2008 Tilman Spengler
- 2011 Keto von Waberer
- 2014 Hans Pleschinski
- 2017 Mirjam Pressler
- 2020 Christine Wunnicke
- 2023 Dagmar Leupold
