= Reinhard Jirgl =

German writer (born 1953)

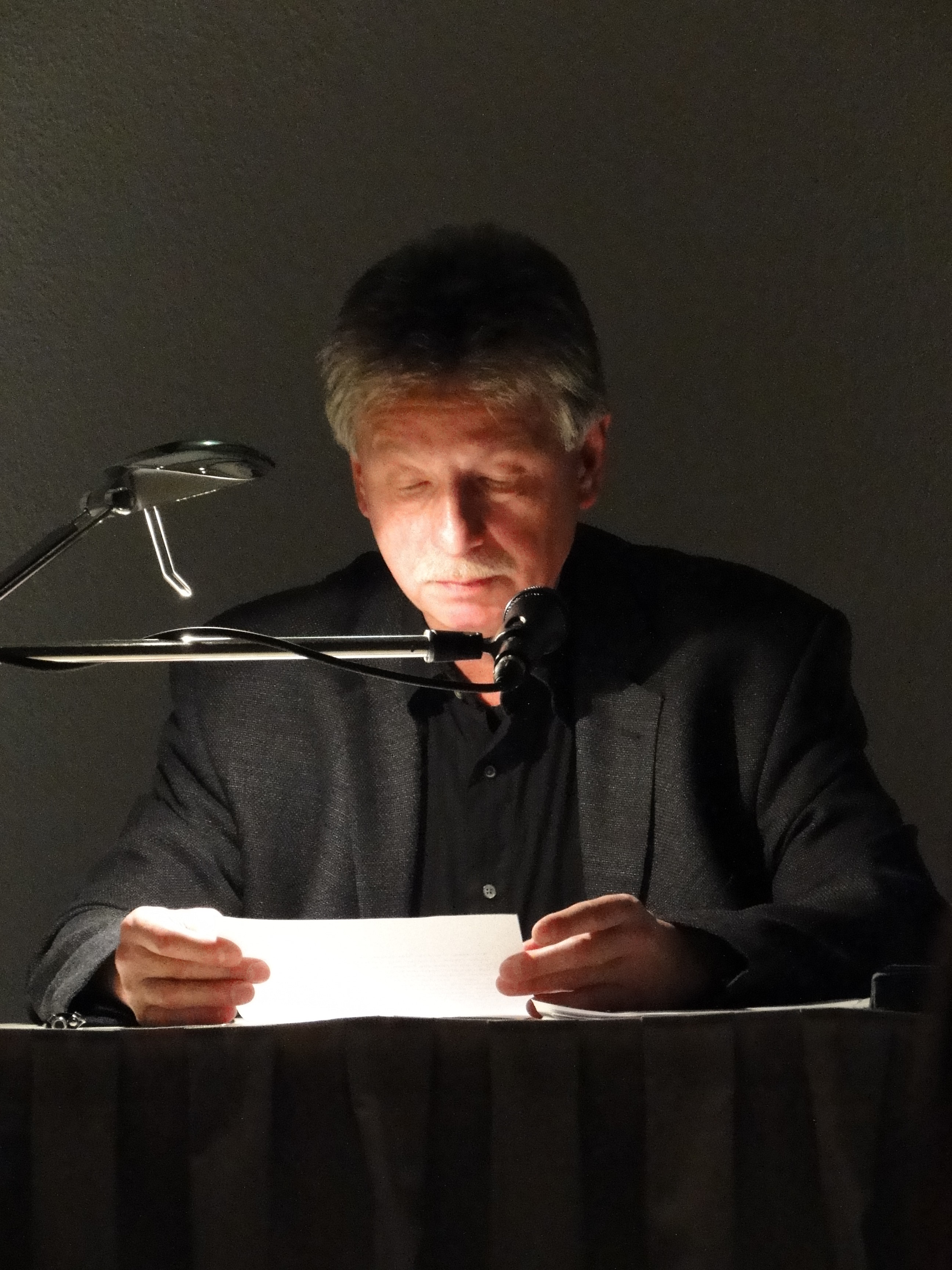
Jirgl in 2009

Reinhard Jirgl (born 16 January 1953 in East Berlin) is a German writer.

== Biography ==
Jirgl was born in Berlin-Friedrichshain. He became a skilled worker for electromechanics. Then he completed a degree in electronics at Humboldt University, Berlin. He made first attempts at prose during his studies in the early 1970s. Since 1975 he worked as an engineer at the Academy of Sciences. He gave up his profession in 1978 to devote more time to writing. He worked as a lighting and service technician at the Volksbühne in Berlin. After submitting his first novel Mutter Vater Roman to a Berlin publishing house in 1985, he was accused of a "non-Marxist conception of history". The publication of the novel was refused. Until 1989, none of his manuscripts were published. Since 2009 he has been a member of the German Academy for Language and Literature. and he is member of the PEN Centre Germany.

Jirgl received the 2003 Rheingau Literatur Preis for his collected works and in particular The Unfinished, which is about the expulsion of the Sudeten Germans and inspired by his own family's history. In 2010 he was awarded the Georg Büchner Prize by the German Academy for Language and Literature. His 2013 novel Nichts von euch auf Erden was shortlisted for the German Book Prize.

At the beginning of 2017, Jirgl withdrew completely from the public. He lives in Berlin.

== Awards ==
- 1991: Anna Seghers-Preis
- 1993: Alfred-Döblin-Preis
- 1994: Marburg Literatur Prize
- 1998: Johannes Bobrowski Medal
- 1999: Joseph-Breitbach-Preis
- 2003: Kranichsteiner Literaturpreis
- 2003: Rheingau Literatur Preis
- 2004: Eugen Viehof-Ehrengabe der Deutschen Schillerstiftung von 1859
- 2004: Dedalus-Preis für Neue Literatur
- 2006: Literaturpreis der Stadt Bremen
- 2007/08: Stadtschreiber von Bergen
- 2009: Lion-Feuchtwanger-Preis
- 2009: Grimmelshausen-Preis for Die Stille
- 2010: Georg-Büchner-Preis
- 2011: Sudetendeutscher Kulturpreis

== Scholarships ==
- 1994: Scholarship in Künstlerdorf Schöppingen
- 1995: Scholarship of the Berliner Kultursenat
- 1996: Alfred-Döblin-Stipendium
- 1997: Scholarship in Künstlerhof Schreyahn
- 1998: Scholarship of the Heinrich-Heine-Haus Lüneburg
- 2002: Scholarship of the Deutscher Literaturfond
- 2007: Scholarship in Künstlerhaus Edenkoben

== Works ==
- Mutter Vater Roman. Aufbau, Berlin/Weimar 1990. ISBN 3-351-01311-6.
- Uberich. Protokollkomödie in den Tod. Jassmann, Frankfurt am Main 1990, ISBN 3-926975-03-2.
- Im offenen Meer. [Schichtungsroman]. Luchterhand, Hamburg/Zürich 1991, ISBN 3-630-86769-3.
- together with Andrzej Madela: Zeichenwende. Kultur im Schatten posttotalitärer Mentalität. Bublies, Koblenz 1993, ISBN 3-926584-24-6.
- Das obszöne Gebet. Totenbuch. Jassmann, Frankfurt am Main 1993, ISBN 3-926975-04-0.
- Abschied von den Feinden. novel. Hanser, Munich/Vienna 1995, ISBN 3-446-18010-9.
- Hundsnächte. novel. Hanser, Munich/Vienna 1997, ISBN 3-446-19118-6.
- Die atlantische Mauer. novel. Hanser, Munich/Vienna 2000, ISBN 3-446-19118-6.
- Genealogie des Tötens. Trilogie. Hanser, Munich 2002, ISBN 3-446-20171-8.
- Gewitterlicht. stories, with the Essay Das poetische Vermögen des alphanumerischen Codes in der Prosa. In: Edition Einst und Jetzt Band 3. revonnah, Hannover 2002, ISBN 3-934818-43-9.
- Die Unvollendeten. novel. Hanser, Munich/Vienna 2003, ISBN 3-446-20271-4.
- Abtrünnig. Roman aus der nervösen Zeit. Hanser, Munich 2005, ISBN 3-446206-58-2. (Paperback: dtv 13639, Munich/Vienna 2008 ISBN 978-3-423-13639-6.)
- Land und Beute. Aufsätze aus den Jahren 1996 bis 2006. Edition Akzente, Hanser, Munich 2008, ISBN 978-3-446-23009-5.
- Die Stille. Roman. Hanser, Munich 2009, ISBN 978-3-446-23266-2.
- Nichts von euch auf Erden. Hanser, Munich 2013, ISBN 978-3-446-24127-5.
- Oben das Feuer, unten der Berg. Hanser, Munich 2016, ISBN 978-3-446-25052-9.
