= Ulrich Peltzer =

German novelist (born 1956)

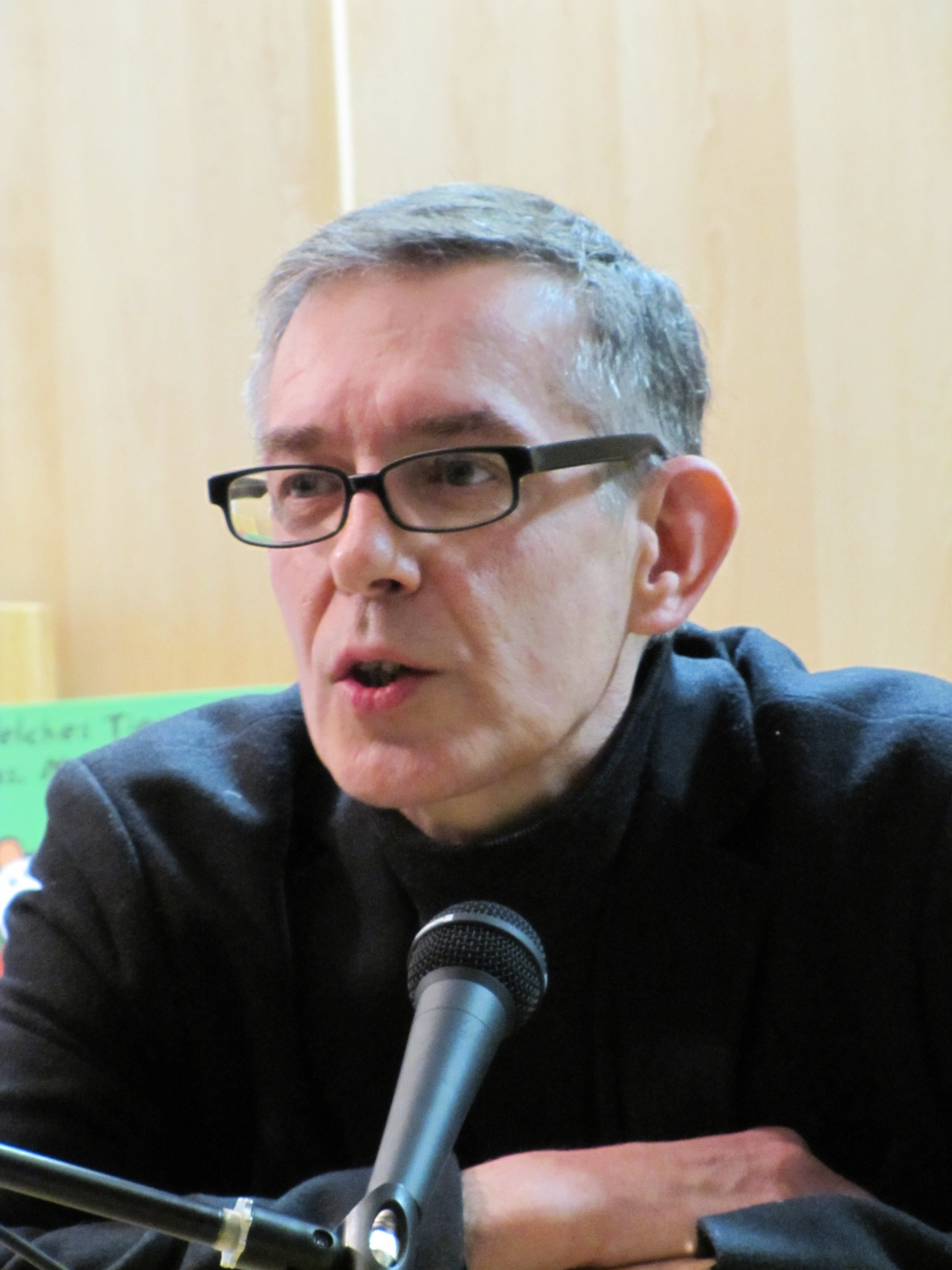
Peltzer in Frankfurt am Main 2010

Ulrich Peltzer (born 9 December 1956) is a German novelist.

== Life ==
Peltzer was born in Krefeld. Starting in 1975, he studied philosophy and social psychology in Berlin. He graduated as a psychologist in 1982. Since then he has been working as a full-time author.

As of 2007, he has written five novels. Four of them deal with his experiences in Berlin, but one takes place in New York (Bryant Park). Peltzer usually rejects conventional, realistic descriptions of reality. Instead, his characters are depicted through a stream-of-consciousness technique.

Peltzer lives in Berlin.

== Awards ==
Peltzer has received several awards:

- 1992 Bertelsmann-award at the Ingeborg Bachmann Prize in Klagenfurt
- 1996 Berliner Literaturpreis of the Stiftung Preußische Seehandlung
- 1997 Anna Seghers Prize
- 2000 Preis der SWR-Bestenliste
- 2001 Niederrheinischer Literaturpreis of the city of Krefeld
- 2003 Bremer Literaturpreis
- 2008 Berliner Literaturpreis for lifetime achievement
- 2009/2010 Stadtschreiber von Bergen
- 2015 Franz-Hessel-Preis
- 2016 Kranichsteiner Literaturpreis

== Novels ==
- Die Sünden der Faulheit (The Sins of Laziness), Zürich: Ammann Verlag (1987), ISBN 978-3-250-10067-6.
- Stefan Martinez, Zürich: Ammann Verlag (1995), ISBN 978-3-250-10270-0.
- Alle oder keiner (All or No One), Zürich: Ammann Verlag (2000), ISBN 978-3-250-10408-7.
- Bryant Park, Zürich: Ammann Verlag (2002), ISBN 978-3-250-60035-0.
- Teil der Lösung, Zürich: Ammann Verlag (2007) ISBN 978-3-250-60113-5.
  - Published in English as Part of the Solution. Calcutta, London, New York: Seagull Books (2011). University of Chicago Pr. (2019), ISBN 978-0-85742-633-8.
- Das bessere Leben, Frankfurt am Main: S. Fischer (2015), ISBN 978-3-10-060805-5.

== Interviews ==
- Ich setze mich einfach hin und fange an (I simply sit down and start) – Interview, in: BELLA triste Nr. 10, 2004.
