= Heinz Czechowski =

German poet and dramatist

Heinz Czechowski (7 February 1935 – 21 October 2009) was a German poet and dramatist.

At the age of ten, Czechowski survived the highly destructive bombing of his birthplace of Dresden. After training in surveying and graphic design, he studied at the Johannes R. Becher Institute of Literature in Leipzig, where he was strongly influenced by Georg Maurer and the Saxon school. His first published poems appeared in 1957 in an issue of Neue Deutsche Literatur. From 1961 to 1965, he worked at the Mitteldeutscher Verlag publishing house in Halle, Saxony-Anhalt. Between 1971 and 1973, he wrote plays for the city of Magdeburg, after which he became a freelance writer.

Czechowski produced free translations of the work of foreign poets (e.g. Anna Akhmatova, Mikhail Lermontov, Marina Tsvetaeva, and Yiannis Ritsos). He was a founding member of the Leipzig Free Academy of the Arts.

== Works ==
- Nachmittag eines Liebespaares. Poems, 1962
- Sieben Rosen hat der Strauch. Mitteldeutscher Verlag, 1964 (anthology)
- Zwischen Wäldern und Flüssen. Mitteldeutscher Verlag, 1965 (anthology)
- Unser der Tag, unser das Wort. Mitteldeutscher Verlag, 1966 (anthology)
- Wasserfahrt. Poems, 1967
- Spruch und Widerspruch. Prose, 1974
- Schafe und Sterne. Poems, 1975
- Was mich betrifft. Poems, 1981, ISBN 3-935877-05-6
- Von Paris nach Montmartre. 1981, ISBN 3-354-00056-2
- Ich, beispielsweise. Poems, 1982
- An Freund und Feind. Poems, 1983, ISBN 3-446-13850-1
- Herr Neithardt geht durch die Stadt. 1983, ISBN 3-354-00437-1
- Kein näheres Zeichen. Mitteldeutscher Verlag, 1987, ISBN 3-354-00179-8
- Sanft gehen wie Tiere die Berge neben dem Fluß. 1989
- Die überstandene Wende. 1989
- Mein Venedig. Poems and prose, 1989, ISBN 3-8031-0169-7
- Auf eine im Feuer versunkene Stadt. 1990, ISBN 3-354-00632-3
- Nachtspur. Poems and prose, 1993, ISBN 3-250-10184-2
- Gedichte und Poeme. 1996
- Mein westfälischer Frieden. Ein Zyklus. Nyland-Stiftung, 1998, ISBN 3-506-76162-5
- Sauerländische Elegie. 1998
- Ich und die Folgen. Rowohlt, 1998, ISBN 3-498-00881-1
- Das offene Geheimnis. 1999, ISBN 3-933749-05-0
- Die Zeit steht still. Poems, Grupello Verlag, 2000, ISBN 3-933749-31-X
- Wüste Mark Kolmen. Poems, Ammann Verlag, 2000, ISBN 3-250-10318-7
- Seumes Brille. Gedichte aus der Schöppinger Chronik (1999/2000). UN ART IG Verlag, 2000, ISBN 3-9807111-3-7
- Einmischungen. Grupello Verlag, 2000, ISBN 3-933749-46-8
- Seumes Brille. Grupello Verlag, 2002, ISBN 3-933749-66-2
- Der Garten meines Vaters. Grupello Verlag, 2003, ISBN 3-933749-96-4
- Die Elbe bei Pieschen und andere Ortsbeschreibungen. ISBN 3-928833-21-9
- Unstrutwärts. ISBN 3-910206-12-3
- Von allen Wundern geheilt. Gedichte. onomato Verlag, 2006, ISBN 3-939511-01-3
- Die Pole der Erinnerung. Autobiographie. Grupello Verlag, 2006, ISBN 3-89978-046-9

== Prizes ==
- 1961: Kunstpreis der Stadt Halle
- 1970: Goethepreis der Stadt Berlin (collective prize)
- 1976: Heinrich-Heine-Preis des Ministeriums für Kultur der DDR
- 1984: Heinrich Mann Prize der Akademie der Künste der DDR
- 1990/1991: Stadtschreiber von Bergen
- 1996: Hans-Erich-Nossack-Preis des Kulturkreises der deutschen Wirtschaft
- 1998: Dresdner Stadtschreiber
- 1999: Dr. Manfred Jahrmarkt-Ehrengabe der Deutsche Schillerstiftung
- 2001: Brüder-Grimm-Preis der Stadt Hanau

== Bibliography ==
- Renatus Deckert: Ruine und Gedicht. Das zerstörte Dresden im Werk von Volker Braun, Heinz Czechowski und Durs Grünbein, Thelem Verlag, Dresden 2010. ISBN 978-3-939888-94-9
