= Dedalus-Preis für Neue Literatur =

German literary award

Dedalus-Preis für Neue Literatur is a German literary prize. The award was named after the main character in the novel A Portrait of the Artist as a Young Man by James Joyce. It was awarded between 1996 and 2004.

== Winners ==
- 1996 – Anne Duden
- 1998 – Wolfgang Schlüter
- 2000 – David Wagner
- 2002 – Walter Kempowski
- 2004 – Reinhard Jirgl
