= Ralf Rothmann =

German novelist, poet and dramatist

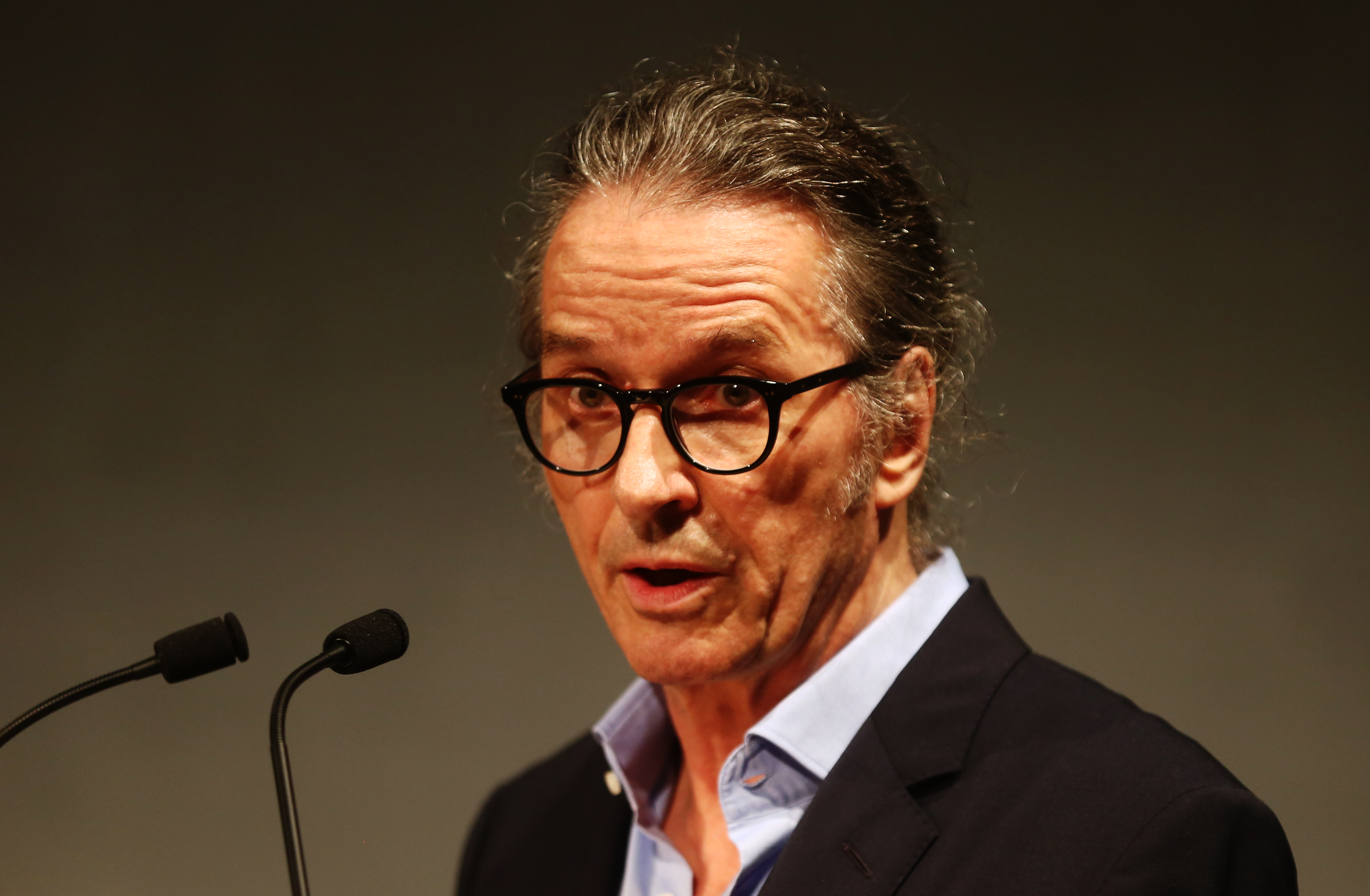
Ralf Rothmann, 2023

Ralf Rothmann (born 10 May 1953, in Schleswig, Schleswig-Holstein) is a German novelist, poet, and dramatist. His novels have been translated into several languages, with Knife Edge (Messers Schneide), Young Light (Junges Licht), Fire Doesn't Burn (Feuer brennt nicht), To Die in Spring (Im Frühling sterben) and The God of that Summer (Der Gott jenes Sommers) being translated into English. The main subjects of his work are the bourgeois and proletarian realities of life in the Ruhr area (e.g., Stier, Wäldernacht, Milch und Kohle and Junges Licht) as well as Berlin (Flieh mein Freund, Hitze, Feuer brennt nicht), with an autobiographically colored focus on alienation, the attempt to escape these situations, and common solitude. With the major novels Im Frühling sterben, Der Gott jenes Sommers and Die Nacht unterm Schnee, Rothmann goes back to the time of the Second World War and explores the horrors for the individual. The five volumes of short stories Ein Winter unter Hirschen, Rehe am Meer, Shakespeares Hühner, Hotel der Schlaflosen and Museum der Einsamkeit complete the author's extensive oeuvre.

== Works ==
- Messers Schneide (story). 1986. ISBN 978-3-518-38133-5 - engl. edition as Knife Edge. New Directions, 1992. ISBN 978-0-8112-1204-5
- Kratzer und andere Gedichte (poems). 1987. ISBN 978-3-518-02657-1
- Der Windfisch (story). 1988. ISBN 978-3-518-40129-3
- Stier (novel). 1991. ISBN 978-3-518-22364-2
- Wäldernacht (novel). 1994. ISBN 978-3-518-39082-5
- Berlin Blues. Ein Schauspiel (play). 1997. ISBN 978-3-518-39082-5
- Flieh, mein Freund! (novel). 1998. ISBN 978-3-518-45505-0
- Milch und Kohle (novel). 2000. ISBN 978-3-518-39809-8
- Gebet in Ruinen (poems). 2000. ISBN 978-3-518-41168-1
- Ein Winter unter Hirschen (stories). 2001. ISBN 978-3-518-45524-1
- Hitze (novel). 2003. ISBN 978-3-518-41396-8
- Junges Licht (novel). 2004. ISBN 978-3-518-41640-2 - engl. edition as Young Light. Seagull Books, 2010. ISBN 978-1-906497-54-5
- Rehe am Meer (stories). 2006. ISBN 978-3-518-41825-3
- Vollkommene Stille (speech at the presentation of the Max Frisch Prize). 2006. ISBN 978-3-518-06850-2
- Feuer brennt nicht (novel). 2009. ISBN 978-3-518-42063-8 - engl. edition as Fire Doesn't Burn. Seagull Books, 2012. ISBN 978-0-85742-047-3
- Shakespeares Hühner (stories). 2012. ISBN 978-3-518-42248-9
- Im Frühling sterben (novel). 2015. ISBN 978-3-518-42475-9 - engl. edition as To Die in Spring. Farrar, Straus and Giroux, 2017. ISBN 978-0-374-27814-4 and Picador (Pan Macmillan), 2017. ISBN 978-1-5098-1286-8
- Der Gott jenes Sommers (novel). 2018. ISBN 978-3-518-42793-4 - engl. edition as The God of that Summer. Picador (Pan Macmillan), 2022. ISBN 978-1-5290-0985-9
- Hotel der Schlaflosen (stories). 2020. ISBN 978-3-518-42960-0
- Die Nacht unterm Schnee (novel). 2022. ISBN 978-3-518-43085-9
- Theorie des Regens (notes). 2023. ISBN 978-3-518-22545-5
- Museum der Einsamkeit (stories). 2025 ISBN 978-3-518-43230-3

== Awards ==
- 1986: Märkisches Stipendium für Literatur for Kratzer
- 1992: Mara-Cassens-Preis
- 1992/1993: Stadtschreiber von Bergen
- 1996: Literaturpreis Ruhr
- 2001: Hermann-Lenz-Preis
- 2002: Kranichsteiner Literaturpreis
- 2003: Evangelischer Buchpreis
- 2004: Wilhelm Raabe Literature Prize
- 2004: Rheingau Literatur Preis
- 2005: Heinrich-Böll-Preis
- 2006: Max Frisch Preis of the City of Zürich
- 2007: Erik-Reger-Preis
- 2008: Literaturpreis der Konrad-Adenauer-Stiftung
- 2008: Hans Fallada Preis
- 2010: Walter-Hasenclever-Literaturpreis
- 2013: Friedrich-Hölderlin-Preis of the City of Bad Homburg
- 2014: Kunst- und Kulturpreis der deutschen Katholiken
- 2016: Stefan-Andres-Preis
- 2017: Kleist Prize
- 2017: Gerty-Spies-Literaturpreis
- 2018: Premio San Clemente (Spain)
- 2018: Uwe Johnson Prize
- 2018: HWA Gold Crown for Historical Fiction (England)
- 2023: Thomas-Mann-Preis
- 2025: Kunstpreis des Landes Nordrhein-Westfalen
