= Aris Fioretos =

Swedish writer (born 1960)

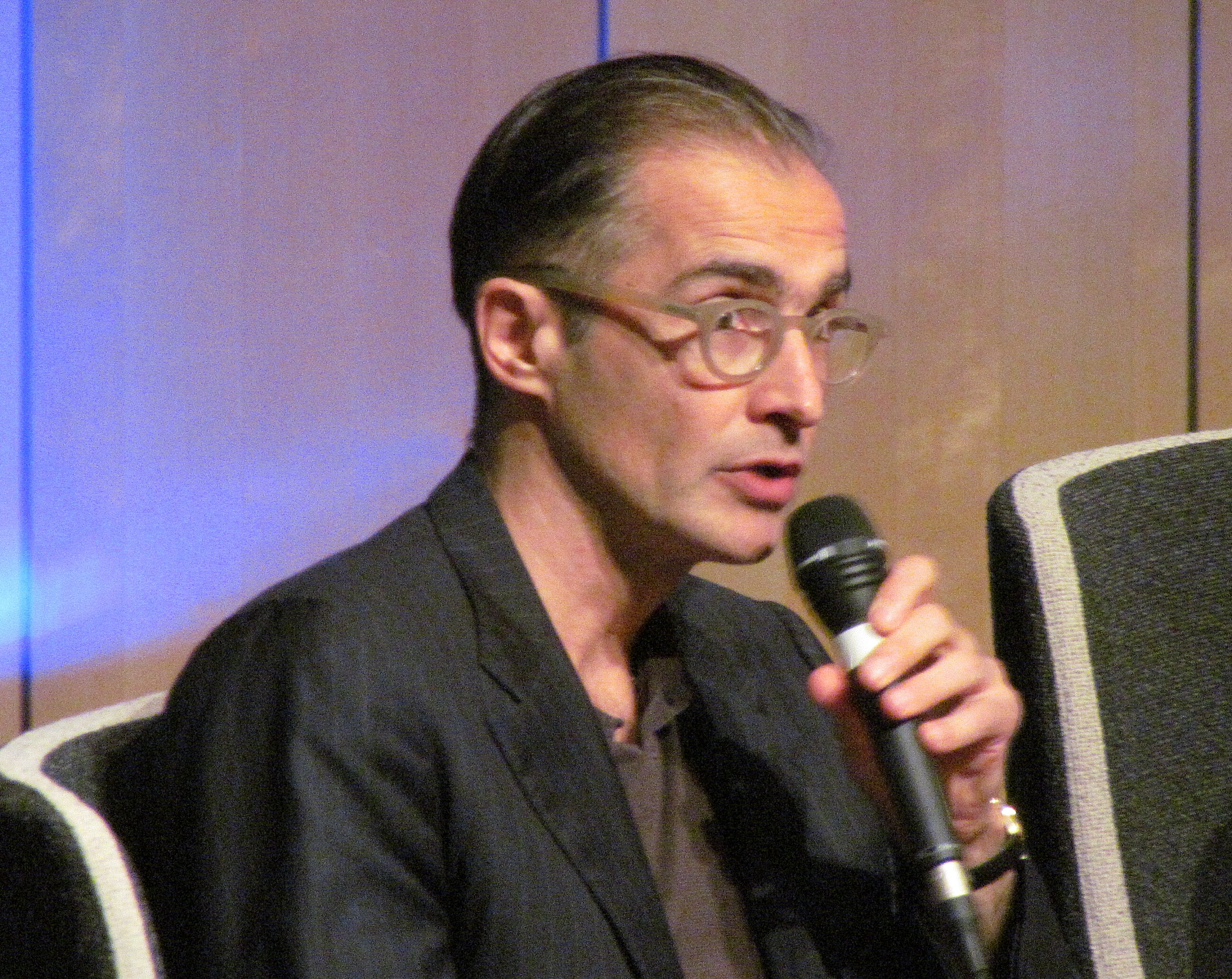
- Born: 6 February 1960 (age 66); Gothenburg, Sweden
- Spouse: Marina Schiptjenko
- Awards: Preis der SWR-Bestenliste; Berlin Prize

Academic background
- Education: Stockholm University; Yale University
- Thesis: The Critical Moment

Academic work
- Discipline: aesthetics
- Institutions: Södertörn University
- Notable works: Den sista greken Mary
- Website: http://www.arisfioretos.com/

Aris Fioretos, Erlangen 2024

Aris Fioretos (born 6 February 1960) is a Swedish writer, translator and scholar of Greek and Austrian extraction who writes in Swedish, German and English. Aside from his own literary career, he is also Professor of Aesthetics at Södertörn University and a member of both the Deutsche Akademie für Sprache und Dichtung and the Akademie der Künste.

== Biography ==
Aris Fioretos was born in Gothenburg. His Greek father was a professor of medicine, his Austrian mother ran a gallery. At home, German and Swedish were spoken. He grew up in Lund. He studied with Jacques Derrida in Paris, later at Stockholm and Yale Universities. In 1991, Fioretos earned his PhD in Comparative Literature with The Critical Moment, a deconstructivist analysis of works by Friedrich Hölderlin, Walter Benjamin, and Paul Celan. He has held academic appointments at the Johns Hopkins University, Rutgers University, Free University, and Humboldt University, the latter two both in Berlin. Since 2010, he is a professor of Aesthetics at Södertörn University in Stockholm. Fioretos is married to art gallerist Marina Schiptjenko, and lives and works in Stockholm, Berlin and Greece.

== Work ==
In 1991, Fioretos published his first book, a collection of prose poetry entitled Delandets bok (The Book of Imparting). Since then he has published several works of fiction, including Vanitasrutinerna (The Vanity Routines) (1998), Stockholm Noir (2000), Sanningen om Sascha Knisch (The Truth about Sascha Knisch) (2002), and Den sista greken (The Last Greek) (2009). The latter novel was shortlisted for Sweden's most prestigious literary award, the August Prize, as was his 2015 novel Mary. In the winter of 2009 Den sista greken was awarded the Gleerups Literary Prize, in the spring of 2010 the Novel Prize of Sveriges Radio – an honor also bestowed upon Mary in 2016. Between 2003 and 2007, Fioretos was Cultural Counsellor at the Swedish Embassy in Berlin. Fioretos's contribution to Sweden's most popular radio show, Sommar ("Summer"), a series of self-portraits by Swedes famous and unknown, was aired on 16 July 2010.

An extensive treatment of his literary work until 2012 is made in a conversation, in Swedish, with literary critic Mikael van Reis. Comments on more recent works may be found in a long conversation with German literary critic Cornelia Jentzsch, entitled Den tredje handen (The Third Hand) and included in the box Grå kvartett (Gray Quartet), published in 2024. The same year, he held the prestigious Frankfurt poetics lectures as the first guest not primarily writing in German. The lectures appeared as Solar plexus in 2025. In the same year, the first international conference devoted to his works was held at the University of Zürich. The lectures have been in edited by Irina Hron and Klaus Müller-Wille in the multi-author volume Aris Fioretos. Lektüren aus dem Verstehenslaboratorium, and will appear with edition text + kritik in March 2027.

Fioretos has received numerous grants and awards both in Sweden and abroad, including from The Getty Center for the History of Art and the Humanities, the Swedish Academy, the Alexander von Humboldt-Stiftung, the DAAD Künstlerprogramm Berlin, the Bank of Sweden Tercentenary Fund, the American Academy in Berlin, and All Souls College, Oxford. Fioretos is a member of the Deutsche Akademie für Sprache und Dichtung in Darmstadt, where, in 2011, he was elected vice president. Since 2022, he is also a member of Akademie der Künste in Berlin.

Fioretos has translated books by Paul Auster, Friedrich Hölderlin, Vladimir Nabokov, and Walter Serner, among others, into Swedish. He writes regularly for Sweden's largest daily, Dagens Nyheter. His fiction has been translated into several languages – including English, French, German, Dutch, Greek, Norwegian, Romanian, and Serbian. The English edition of The Truth about Sascha Knisch was translated by Fioretos himself.

== Bibliography ==
- Delandets bok (The Book of Imparting), prose poetry (1991)
- Det kritiska ögonblicket: Hölderlin, Benjamin, Celan (The Critical Moment: Hölderlin, Benjamin, Celan), dissertation (1991)
- Den grå boken (The Gray Book), essay (1994)
- En bok om fantomer (A Book about Phantoms), essay (1996)
- Vanitasrutinerna (The Vanity Routines), short prose (1998)
- Stockholm noir (Stockholm Noir), novel (2000)
- Skallarna (The Skulls), essay (2001) (with Katarina Frostenson)
- Sanningen om Sascha Knisch (The Truth about Sascha Knisch), novel (2002)
- Vidden av en fot (The Width of a Foot), essays, prose, aphorisms (2008)
- Babel: Festschrift für Werner Hamacher (Babel), editor (2008)
- Den siste greken (The Last Greek), novel (2009)
- Flucht und Verwandlung: Nelly Sachs, Dichterin, Berlin/Stockholm (Flight and Metamorphosis) (2010)
- Halva solen (Half the Sun), prose (2012)
- Avtalad tid (Appointments), conversations with Durs Grünbein (2012)
- Mary (Mary), novel (2015)
- Vatten, gåshud (Water, Gooseflesh), essay (2015)
- Nelly B:s hjärta (Nelly B's Heart), novel (2018) inspired by the life of the first German woman pilot Amelie Beese.
- Atlas (Atlas), prose (2019)
- De tunna gudarna (The Thin Gods), novel (2022)
- Nabokovs ryggrad (Nabokov's Spine), essay (2024)
- Grå kvartett (Gray Quartet), revised editions of Fioretos's first four books, as well as a long conversation with Cornelia Jentzsch, entitled Den tredje handen (The Third Hand) (2024)
- Solar plexus (Solar Plexus), essay (2025)
- Yellow, novel (2026)

Books in English:

- The Gray Book (own translation of Den grå boken) (Stanford University Press, 1999)
- Re: The Rainbow, editor (Propexus, 2004)
- The Truth about Sascha Knisch (self-translation of Sanningen om Sascha Knisch (Jonathan Cape, 2006; Vintage, 2008)
- Nelly Sachs, Flight and Metamorphosis (translation of Flucht und Verwandlung) (Stanford University Press, 2012)

Translations into Swedish:

- Jacques Derrida, Schibboleth, with Hans Ruin (1990)
- Friedrich Hölderlin, Hymner (1991), revised edition: Sånger (2001), second revised and enlarged edition: Kom nu, eld! (2013)
- Paul Auster, Att uppfinna ensamheten (The Invention of Solitude) (1992)
- Paul Auster, Den röda anteckningsboken (The Red Notebook) (1993)
- Vladimir Nabokov, Pnin (Pnin) (2000)
- Vladimir Nabokov, Masjenka (Mary) (2001)
- Vladimir Nabokov, Sebastian Knights verkliga liv (The Real Life of Sebastian Knight) (2002)
- Vladimir Nabokov, Lolita (Lolita) (2007)
- Walter Serner, Handbok för svindlare (Letzte Lockerung) (2010)
- Peter Waterhouse, Pappren mellan fingrarna (Paper between Fingers) (2011)
- Friedrich Hölderlin, Kom nu, eld! (Come now, fire!) (2013)
- Vladimir Nabokov, Ögat (The Eye) (2015)
- Jan Wagner, Självporträtt med bisvärm (Self-Portrait with Bee Swarm) (2016)
- Vladimir Nabokov, Förtvivlan (Despair) (2017)
- Vladimir Nabokov, Genomskinliga ting (Transparent Things) (2017)
- Vladimir Nabokov, Bragden (Glory) (2020)
- Jo Shapcott, Pissblomma (Pissflower) (2022)
- Aleš Šteger, Över himlen under jorden, with Mita Gustinčič Pahor (Above Heaven Below Earth) (2024)
- Vladimir Nabokov, Noveller (Stories) (2026)

Editions:

- Word Traces: New Readings of Paul Celan, editor (Johns Hopkins University Press, 1994)
- The Solid Letter: Readings of Friedrich Hölderlin, editor (Stanford University Press, 1999)
- Berlin über und unter der Erde (Berlin Above and Below Ground) (2007)
- Nelly Sachs, Werke, general editor of the commented edition in four volumes (Suhrkamp, 2010–2011); editor for volumes III (Scenic Poetry) and IV (Prose and Translations)
- Paul Celan – Gedichte. Selection and Afterword Aris Fioretos. With drawings by Gisèle Celan-Lestrange (Suhrkamp Verlag, Berlin 2011)

== Prizes ==
- The A. Owen Aldridge Prize, ACLA 1989
- The Karin and Karl Ragnar Gierow Prize, Swedish Academy, 1994
- The Winter Prize of the De Nio Foundation, 2000
- The Lydia and Herman Eriksson's Prize, Swedish Academy, 2003
- The Gleerups Literary Prize, 2009
- The Novel Prize of Swedish Radio, 2010
- Preis der SWR-Bestenliste, 2011
- Sture Linnér Prize, 2011
- The Kellgren Prize, Swedish Academy, 2011
- The Sorescu Prize, Romanian Culturual Institute, 2012
- Independent Publisher Book Award, Silver Medal, Biography 2013
- The Big Prize, Samfundet De Nio, 2013
- The Novel Prize of Swedish Radio, 2016
- The Jeanette Schocken Prize (Bremerhaven), 2017
- The Essay Prize, Swedish Academy, 2018
- Order of Merit of the Federal Republic of Germany, 2020
- Frankfurter Poetikvorlesungen, 2024
- The Big Prize of the Friends of the Swedish Institute in Athens, 2025
