= Erik-Reger-Preis =

Erik-Reger-Preis was a literary prize of Germany from 1999 to 2009.

- 1999 Ernst-Wilhelm Händler
- 2001 Mark Siemons
- 2003 Uwe Timm
- 2005 Peter Rühmkorf
- 2007 Ralf Rothmann
