= Rheingau Literatur Preis =

German literary award

Rheingau Literatur Preis is a literary prize of Hesse. It is awarded annually since 1994 by the Rheingau Literatur Festival which follows the Rheingau Musik Festival. An author is awarded whose prose gained the attention of the literary critics ("deren schriftstellerische Prosa in den vergangenen zwölf Monaten die Literaturkritik aufmerksam gemacht hat")

The prize of 11,111 Euro is given by the cultural ministry Hessisches Ministerium für Wirtschaft, Verkehr und Landesentwicklung and by the Rheingau Musik Festival. The author also receives 111 bottles of Rheingau Riesling, donated by the association Verband Deutscher Prädikatsweingüter (VDP) Rheingau.

== Winners ==
- 1994 Stefanie Menzinger, Schlangenbaden, Wanderungen im Inneren des Häftlings
- 1995 Ulla Berkéwicz, Überlebnis, Sopravvivenza
- 1996 Herbert Maurer, Sprich günstig mit dem Balkan, Pannonias Zunge
- 1997 Thomas Meinecke, Tomboy, Hellblau
- 1998 Hella Eckert, Hanomag, Da hängt mein Kleid
- 1999 Thomas Lehr, September. Fata Morgana, 42
- 2000 Peter Stamm, Sieben Jahre, An einem Tag wie diesem
- 2001 Bodo Kirchhoff, Parlando, Erinnerungen an meinen Porsche
- 2002 Robert Gernhardt, Reim und Zeit, Gesammelte Gedichte: 1954 – 2006
- 2003 Reinhard Jirgl, Die Unvollendeten, Abtrünnig: Roman aus der nervösen Zeit
- 2004 Ralf Rothmann, Feuer brennt nicht, Junges Licht
- 2005 Gert Loschütz, Auf der Birnbaumwiese, Dunkle Gesellschaft: Roman in zehn Regennächten
- 2006 Clemens Meyer, Als wir träumten, Gewalten: Ein Tagebuch
- 2007 Antje Rávik Strubel, Gebrauchsanweisung für Schweden, Kältere Schichten der Luft
- 2008 Ursula Krechel, Shanghai fern von wo, Ungezürnt: Gedichte, Lichter, Lesezeichen
- 2009 Christoph Peters, Stadt Land Fluß, Mitsukos Restaurant
- 2010 Jochen Schimmang, Das Beste, was wir hatten
- 2011 Josef Haslinger, Jáchymov
- 2012 Sten Nadolny, Weitlings Sommerfrische
- 2013 Ralph Dutli, Soutines letzte Fahrt
- 2014 Stephanie Bart, Deutscher Meister
- 2015 Klaus Modick, Konzert ohne Dichter
- 2016 Saša Stanišić, Wie der Soldat das Grammofon repariert
- 2017 Ingo Schulze, Peter Holtz: Sein glückliches Leben erzählt von ihm selbst
- 2018 Robert Seethaler, Das Feld
- 2019 Dörte Hansen, Mittagsstunde
- 2020 Annette Pehnt, Alles was Sie sehen ist neu
- 2021 Judith Hermann, Daheim
- 2022 Katerina Poladjan, Zukunftsmusik
- 2023 Arno Geiger, Das glückliche Geheimnis
- 2024 Matthias Jügler, Maifliegenzeit
- 2025 Jonas Lüscher, Verzauberte Vorbestimmung
