= Bodo Kirchhoff =

German writer

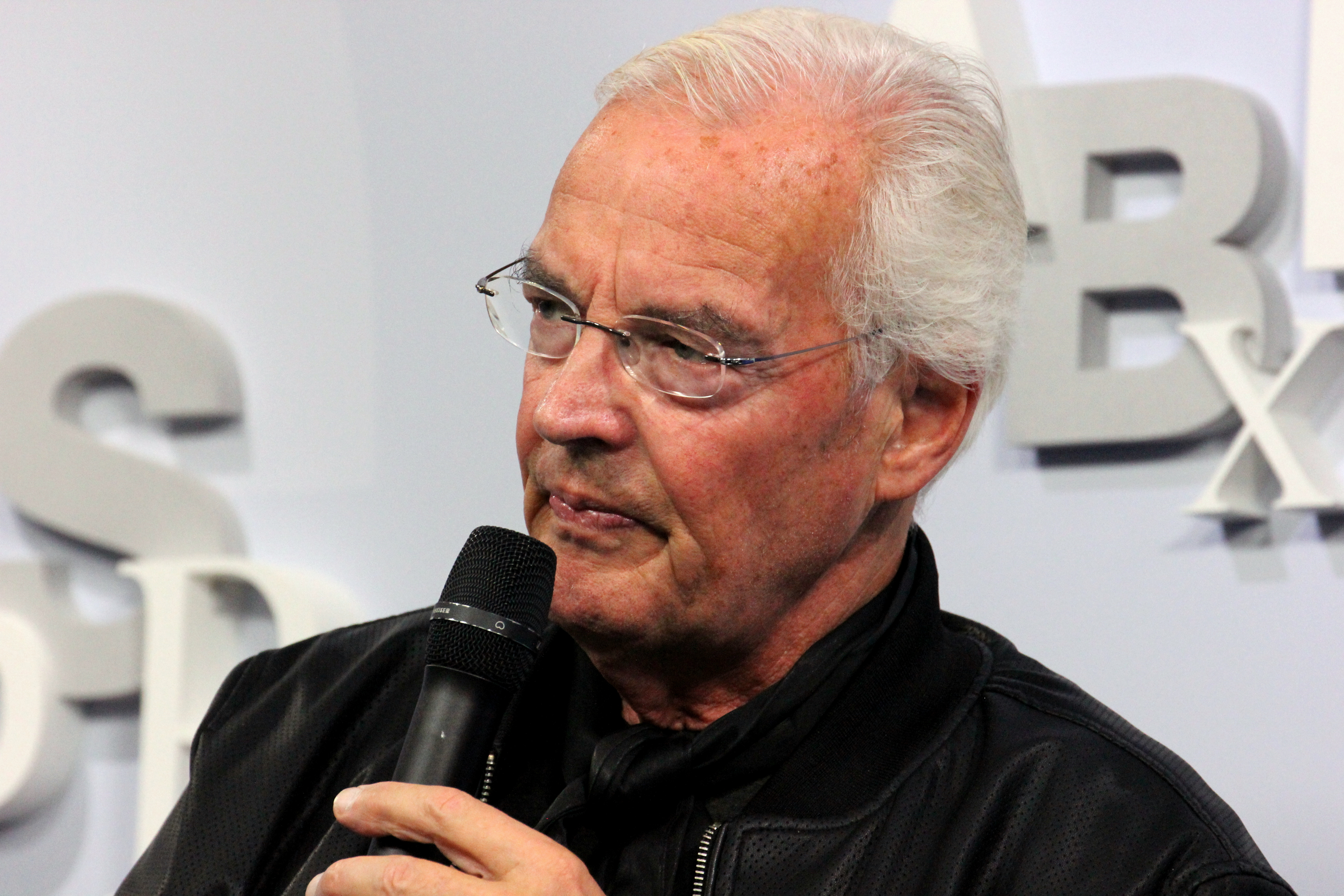
Kirchhoff at the Frankfurt Book Fair 2016

Bodo Kirchhoff (born 6 July 1948) is a German writer and novelist. He was born in Hamburg before moving with his family to Kirchzarten in the Black Forest in 1955, which he describes as a culture shock. In addition to writing literary fiction, he has worked on various projects for German television, such as long-runner Tatort, and has written movie screenplays. One of his best-known novels is Infanta (1990), which has been translated into more than a dozen languages. In 2016, his novel, which features an African migrant in Italy, Encounter won the German Book Prize.

== Life ==
Kirchhoff received his high school diploma in 1968. He then spent two years in the military, followed by a year selling ice cream in the United States. From 1972 to 1979, he studied pedagogy and psychology at Frankfurt University and completed his doctoral thesis on Jacques Lacan. During this period, he was noticed by Suhrkamp, with whom he published until he switched to Frankfurter Verlagsanstalt, and published a both a novel and a play in 1979, beginning his career as a prolific author and multiple prize winner.

In the 1980s, he traveled extensively and wrote for the magazine TransAtlantik. In 1993, he evaluated the German Army's participation in UNOSOM. After this, he was the 1994–95 Lecturer at the prestigious Frankfurt lectures.

In 2010, Kirchhoff revealed in an article in Der Spiegel that as a twelve-year-old schoolboy, he had been sexually abused by the choirmaster at his boarding school on Lake Constance, which he began attending in 1959, after the divorce of his parents. He has said that his work, as a consequence, often has as its theme "the reconciliation between sexuality and language"

=== Family ===
In 1987, he married editor and lecturer Ulrike Bauer. Together they have two children, Claudius, born 1988, and Sophia, born 1993. Since 2003, they have offered week-long writing courses at the cost of €1900 at their home in Italy.

== Awards ==
- 1984: Jahreskunstpreis des Frankfurter Vereins für Künstlerhilfe
- 1989: Villa Massimo scholarship, Rome
- 1999: Bayerischer Filmpreis – Award for Screenplay
- 2001: Rheingau Literatur Preis
- 2002: Deutscher Kritikerpreis
- 2002: Preis der LiteraTour Nord
- 2008: Carl-Zuckmayer-Medaille for Services to the German Language
- 2012: Shortlisted for the German Book Prize with Die Liebe in groben Zügen
- 2016: Winner of the German Book Prize with Widerfahrnis

== Reviews for Encounter ==
In a densely woven narrative, Kirchhoff succeeds in negotiating the great motifs of his literary oeuvre in a small space. At the same time, he writes about our present and about how two melancholy seekers of good fortune encounter the people who, in this day and age, are setting out in the opposite direction, from South to North. Kirchhoff's 'Widerfahrnis' ('Experience') is a many-layered text that masterfully interweaves private and political existential questions and releases the reader out into the open.

A story that contains elements of male phantasies, which is sometimes painfully cheesy and desperately wants to include a current topic by connecting the refugee crisis of summer 2015 with tales of the last love.

Bodo Kirchhoffs novel connects the theme of love to the topic of migration. Thereby the story gains an eminently political significance. In addition, the appearance of several incidents with different refugees, whom the protagonists encounter through their journey in Italy, are a clever leitmotifical element.

== Screenplays ==
- 1997: Tatort: Alptraum, Director: Bodo Fürneisen
- 2000: Tatort: Nach eigenen Gesetzen, Director: Josef Rödl
- 2002: My Last Film, Director: Oliver Hirschbiegel
- 2004: Die Konferenz, Director: Niki Stein

== Works ==
- Ohne Eifer, Ohne Zorn. Novelle. Suhrkamp, Frankfurt am Main 1979, ISBN 3-518-03430-8. Neuausgabe 2013, Frankfurter Verlagsanstalt, Frankfurt am Main ISBN 978-3-627-00193-3
- Das Kind oder Die Vernichtung von Neuseeland. Schauspiel, Suhrkamp, Frankfurt am Main 1978, DNB 790146029, Uraufführung Saarbrücken 1979.
- Die Einsamkeit der Haut. Erzählung. Suhrkamp, Frankfurt am Main 1981, ISBN 3-518-03431-6.
- Zwiefalten. Roman. Suhrkamp, Frankfurt am Main 1983, ISBN 3-518-04514-8.
- Mexikanische Novelle. Suhrkamp, Frankfurt am Main 1984, ISBN 3-518-04697-7.
- Infanta. Roman. Suhrkamp, Frankfurt am Main 1990, ISBN 3-518-40289-7. Unveränderte Neuauflage: Frankfurter Verlagsanstalt, Frankfurt am Main 2006, ISBN 978-3-627-00138-4.
- Der Sandmann. Roman. Suhrkamp, Frankfurt am Main 1992, ISBN 3-518-40481-4.
- Die Weihnachtsfrau. Frankfurter Verlagsanstalt, Frankfurt am Main 1997, ISBN 3-627-00059-5.
- Manila. Filmbuch. Suhrkamp, Frankfurt am Main 2000, ISBN 978-3-518-39660-5.
- Parlando. Roman. Frankfurter Verlagsanstalt, Frankfurt am Main 2001, ISBN 3-627-00084-6.
- Schundroman. Frankfurter Verlagsanstalt, Frankfurt am Main 2002, ISBN 978-3-627-00095-0.
- Wo das Meer beginnt. Frankfurter Verlagsanstalt, Frankfurt am Main 2004, ISBN 3-627-00115-X.
- Die kleine Garbo. Frankfurter Verlagsanstalt, Frankfurt am Main 2006, ISBN 3-627-00130-3.
- Der Prinzipal. Frankfurter Verlagsanstalt, Frankfurt am Main 2007, ISBN 978-3-627-00139-1.
- Eros und Asche. Ein Freundschaftsroman. Frankfurter Verlagsanstalt, Frankfurt am Main 2007, ISBN 978-3-627-00143-8.
- Erinnerungen an meinen Porsche. Roman, Hoffmann und Campe 2009, ISBN 978-3-455-40184-4.
- Die Liebe in groben Zügen. Roman. Frankfurter Verlagsanstalt, Frankfurt am Main 2012, ISBN 978-3-627-00183-4.
- Verlangen und Melancholie. Roman. Frankfurter Verlagsanstalt, Frankfurt am Main 2014, ISBN 978-3-627-00209-1.
- Widerfahrnis. Novelle. Frankfurter Verlagsanstalt, Frankfurt am Main 2016, ISBN 978-3-627-00228-2.
- Betreff: Einladung zu einer Kreuzfahrt. Roman. Frankfurter Verlagsanstalt, Frankfurt am Main 2017, ISBN 978-3-627-00241-1.
