= Hans-Erich-Nossack-Preis =

German literary award

Hans-Erich-Nossack-Preis was a former literary prize in Germany, named after German writer Hans Erich Nossack, later merged with the Literaturpreis des Kulturkreises der deutschen Wirtschaft.

== Winners ==
- 1989 Friederike Mayröcker
- 1991 Helga M. Novak
- 1992 Günter Herburger
- 1993 Rolf Haufs
- 1994 Edgar Hilsenrath
- 1995 Anna Maria Jokl
- 1996 Heinz Czechowski
- 1997 Rafik Schami
- 1998 Volker Braun
- 1999 Wolfgang Hilbig
- 2000 Peter Kurzeck
- 2001 Jörg Steiner
- 2002 Paul Wühr
- 2003 Adolf Endler
- 2004 Dieter Forte
- 2005 Walter Kempowski
- 2006 Ernst-Wilhelm Händler
- 2007 Elke Erb
