= Preis der SWR-Bestenliste =

German literary award

Preis der SWR-Bestenliste was a literature prize awarded in Baden-Württemberg, Germany.

== Winners ==
- 1978 Gerhard Roth
- 1979 Ludwig Fels
- 1980 Otto F. Walter
- 1981 Peter Weiss
- 1982 Franz Fühmann
- 1983 Oskar Pastior
- 1984 Christa Reinig
- 1985 Friederike Mayröcker
- 1986 György Konrád
- 1987 Brigitte Kronauer
- 1988 Danilo Kiš
- 1989 Paul Wühr
- 1990 Thomas Hürlimann
- 1991 Georges-Arthur Goldschmidt
- 1992 Urs Widmer
- 1993 László Krasznahorkai
- 1994 Zbigniew Herbert
- 1995 Adolf Endler
- 1996 Peter Rühmkorf
- 1997 Markus Werner
- 1998 Dubravka Ugrešić
- 1999 Rafael Chirbes
- 2000 Ulrich Peltzer
- 2001 Katja Lange-Müller
- 2002 Boris Pahor
- 2003 Ernst-Wilhelm Händler
- 2004 Kathrin Röggla
- 2005 Lutz Seiler
- 2006 Agota Kristof
- 2007 Hans Joachim Schädlich
- 2008 Günter Herburger
- 2009 Kathrin Schmidt
- 2010 Patrick Modiano
- 2011 Aris Fioretos
- 2012 Péter Nádas
- 2013 Ulrike Edschmid
- 2014 Angelika Klüssendorf
- 2015 Esther Kinsky
