= Günter Herburger =

German writer (1932–2018)

- Born: 6 April 1932; Isny im Allgäu, Württemberg, Germany
- Died: 3 May 2018 (aged 86); Berlin, Germany
- Resting place: Isny, Allgäu, Germany
- Education: Ludwig-Maximilians-Universität München
- Writing career
- Notable awards: Grimme-Preis; Johann Friedrich von Cotta Prize

Günter Herburger (6 April 1932 – 3 May 2018) was a German writer. He was initially counted among the "New Realists" funded by Dieter Wellershoff, became the author of socialist, imaginative utopian worlds since the 1970s and took an outsider position in German-language contemporary literature. He was a writer of poems, short stories, children's books, radio plays and a member of the PEN Center Germany.

== Early life and education ==
Herbrger was born in Isny, Allgäu. He was the son of a veterinarian. From 1945 to 1950, he attended the Urspring School in Schelklingen. He then began studying Sanskrit at the Ludwig-Maximilians-Universität München. He also studied philosophy and theatre studies.

== Career ==
In 1954, Herburger broke off his studies and went on trips. He lived occasionally in Ibiza, in Madrid and Oran and kept afloat with occasional work. In Paris, he had contact with the author Joseph Breitbach. In 1956, he was forced to return to Munich for health reasons. He worked on his first novel.

After marrying his first wife, Brunhilde Braatz, in Munich, the couple moved across Europe together. In 1957, they separated, and Herburger went back to Isny in the Allgäu. He sought employment at the Süddeutscher Rundfunk in Stuttgart and worked for one year on the production of live broadcasts and documentary films. During this time, Herburger managed, through mediation by Helmut Heissenbüttel, to make contacts with other writers and publish first texts.

In 1962, he married actress Ingrid Mannstaedt, with whom he went to Celle in 1963. Letters became his main occupation, and in 1964 his first prose appeared, which was well received by the critics; next to it emerged radio plays and film scripts. From 1964 Herburger participated in the meetings of the Gruppe 47 (group 47). In 1967, the Herburger family moved to Berlin-Friedenau, where the author maintained lively contacts with numerous fellow writers and with the beginning of the student movement.

In 1973, Herburger returned to Munich after the failure of his second marriage. There he married Rosemarie Leitner and began work on the "Thuja Trilogy", a romance cycle that would keep him busy until the 1990s. Herburger was politically involved as a member of the German Communist Party (DKP) and was temporarily for study purposes in the GDR; later however, given the dogmatic course of the party, he became disillusioned with it more and more. In 1973, he also founded the first cooperative bookstore in Munich together with Martin Gregor-Dellin, Michael Krüger, Paul Wühr, Christoph Buggert and Tankred Dorst. In 1974, after the birth of a disabled daughter, Herburger withdrew more and more from the literary scene, which, despite numerous prizes awarded to him, took less and less notice of him.

In 1975, he published the poem "To Improve the Feuilleton" in which he expressed his rejection of Wolfram Siebeck and other authors. Siebeck replied in the gloss "With German Tongue".

== Personal life ==
From 1983 Herburger developed into a passionate runner, who regularly completed the marathon distance and longer distances and has reported on his experiences with this extreme sport in several books.

Herburger died on 3 May 2018 at the age of 86 in Berlin, a few weeks after his wife Rosemarie. Both died as a result of an accident. He was buried in the municipal cemetery in Isny im Allgäu.

== Literary works ==
=== 1960s ===
- Eine gleichmäßige Landschaft. Erzählungen., Verlag Kiepenheuer & Witsch, Cologne Berlin 1964.
- Ventile. Gedichte. Verlag Kiepenheuer & Witsch, Cologne Berlin 1966.
- Die Messe. Roman. Luchterhand Literaturverlag, Neuwied Berlin 1969.

=== 1970s ===
- Jesus in Osaka. Zukunftsroman. Luchterhand Literaturverlag, Neuwied Berlin 1970.
- Training. Gedichte. Luchterhand Literaturverlag, Neuwied Berlin 1970.
- Birne kann alles. 26 Abenteuergeschichten für Kinder. Luchterhand Literaturverlag, Neuwied Berlin 1971.
- Birne kann noch mehr. 26 Abenteuergeschichten für Kinder. Luchterhand Literaturverlag, Darmstadt Neuwied 1971.
- Die Eroberung der Zitadelle. Erzählungen. Luchterhand Literaturverlag, Darmstadt Neuwied 1972.
- Helmut in der Stadt Rowohlt Verlag, Reinbek bei Hamburg 1972.
- Die amerikanische Tochter. Gedichte, Aufsätze, Hörspiel, Erzählung, Film. Luchterhand Literaturverlag, Darmstadt Neuwied 1973.
- Operette. Gedichte Luchterhand Literaturverlag, Darmstadt Neuwied 1973.
- Schöner kochen. In 52 Arten, Verlag Eremiten-Presse, Düsseldorf 1974. (zusammen mit Birte Lena)
- Birne brennt durch. 26 Abenteuergeschichten für Kinder und Erwachsene. Luchterhand Literaturverlag, Darmstadt Neuwied 1975.
- Hauptlehrer Hofer. Ein Fall von Pfingsten. Zwei Erzählungen. Luchterhand Literaturverlag, Darmstadt Neuwied 1975.
- Ziele. Gedichte. Rowohlt Verlag, Reinbek bei Hamburg 1977.
- Flug ins Herz. Roman. Luchterhand Literaturverlag, Darmstadt Neuwied. (Teil 1 der Thuja-Trilogie).
  - Band 1, 1977.
  - Band 2, 1977.
- Orchidee. Gedichte. Luchterhand Literaturverlag, Darmstadt Neuwied 1979.

=== 1980s ===
- Die Augen der Kämpfer. Roman. Luchterhand Literaturverlag, Darmstadt Neuwied. (Teil 2 der Thuja-Trilogie).
  - Band 1 Erste Reise, 1980.
  - Band 2 Zweite Reise, 1983.
- Blick aus dem Paradies. Thuja. Zwei Spiele eines Themas. Luchterhand Literaturverlag, Darmstadt Neuwied 1981.
- Makadam. Gedichte. Luchterhand Literaturverlag, Darmstadt Neuwied 1982.
- Das Flackern des Feuers im Land. Beschreibungen. Luchterhand Literaturverlag, Darmstadt Neuwied 1983.
- Capri. Die Geschichte eines Diebs. Luchterhand Literaturverlag, Darmstadt Neuwied 1984.
- Das Lager. Ausgewählte Gedichte 1966–1982., Luchterhand Literaturverlag, Darmstadt Neuwied 1984.
- Kinderreich Passmoré. Gedichte. Luchterhand Literaturverlag, Darmstadt Neuwied 1986.
- Kreuzwege. Oberschwäbische Verlags-Anstalt, Ravensburg 1988.
- Lauf und Wahn Luchterhand Literaturverlag, Darmstadt 1988.

=== 1990s ===
- Das brennende Haus. Gedichte. Luchterhand Literaturverlag, Frankfurt am Main 1990.
- Lena. Die Eroberung der Zitadelle. Zwei Erzählungen. Luchterhand Literaturverlag, Frankfurt am Main 1991.
- Thuja. Roman. Luchterhand Literaturverlag, Hamburg Zürich 1991. (Teil 3 der Thuja-Trilogie).
- Sturm und Stille. Gedichte. Luchterhand Literaturverlag, Hamburg 1993.
- Das Glück. Photonovellen. A1 Verlag, München 1994.
- Traum und Bahn, 1994
- Birne kehrt zurück. Neue Abenteuergeschichten. Luchterhand Literaturverlag, München 1996.
- Die Liebe. Photonovellen. A1 Verlag, München 1996.
- Im Gebirge. Gedichte. Luchterhand Literaturverlag, München 1998, ISBN 978-3-630-86996-4.
- Elsa. Roman. Luchterhand Literaturverlag, München 1999, ISBN 978-3-630-87028-1.
- Der Schrecken Süße. Mini-Photonovelle. A1 Verlag, München 1999, ISBN 978-3-927743-45-8.

=== 2000s ===
- Humboldt. Reise-Novellen. A1 Verlag, München 2001, ISBN 978-3-927743-56-4.
- Eine fliegende Festung. Gedichte. A1 Verlag, München 2002, ISBN 978-3-927743-62-5.
- Schlaf und Strecke A1 Verlag, München 2004, ISBN 978-3-927743-74-8.
- Der Tod. Photonovellen. A1 Verlag, München 2006, ISBN 978-3-927743-85-4.
- Trilogie der Verschwendung. Das Glück, Die Liebe, Der Tod. Photonovellen. A1 Verlag, München 2006, ISBN 978-3-927743-86-1.
- Der Kuss. Gedichte. A1 Verlag, München 2008, ISBN 978-3-940666-02-4.
- Die Trilogie der Tatzen. Drei Essays von Günter Herburger und achtundvierzig Monotypien von Günther Förg. Snoeck Verlag, Köln 2008, ISBN 978-3-936859-77-5.

=== 2010s ===
- Ein Loch in der Landschaft. Gedichte. A1 Verlag, München 2010, ISBN 978-3-940666-16-1.
- Haitata: kleine wilde Romane. A1 Verlag, München 2012, ISBN 978-3-940666-23-9.
- Wildnis, singend. Roman. Hanani Verlag, Berlin 2016, ISBN 978-3-944174-24-2.

== Awards and honors ==
- 1965: "Prize of the Young Generation", Literature (Award of the Berliner Kunstpreis)
- 1967: Adolf Grimme Prize with gold for the screenplay for Der Beginn (The Beginning) (together with Peter Lilienthal and Gérard Vandenberg)
- 1973: Bremen Literature Prize
- 1979: Gerrit-Engelke Prize (together with Günter Wallraff)
- 1991: Peter Huchel Prize
- 1991: Toucan Prize
- 1992: Hans Erich Nossack Prize
- 1997: Literature Prize of the City of Munich
- 2008: Preis der SWR-Bestenliste for Der Kuss (The Kiss)
- 2011: By authors for authors
- 2011: Johann Friedrich von Cotta Literature and Translator Prize of the City of Stuttgart

== Filmography ==
- Schoolmaster Hofer, directed by Peter Lilienthal (1975, based on Hauptlehrer Hofer)
- The Conquest of the Citadel, directed by Bernhard Wicki (1977, based on Die Eroberung der Zitadelle)

Screenwriter

- Abschied (dir. Peter Lilienthal, 1966, TV film)
- Der Beginn (dir. Peter Lilienthal, 1966, TV film)
- Tattoo (dir. Johannes Schaaf, 1967)
- Tag der offenen Tür (dir. Wim Verstappen and Pim de la Parra, 1967, short TV film)
- Das Bild (dir. Volker Vogeler, 1967, TV film)
- Die Söhne (dir. Volker Vogeler, 1968, TV film)
- Tanker (dir. Volker Vogeler, 1970, TV film)
