= Amelie Beese =

German aviator (1886–1925)

Amelie Hedwig "Melli" Boutard-Beese
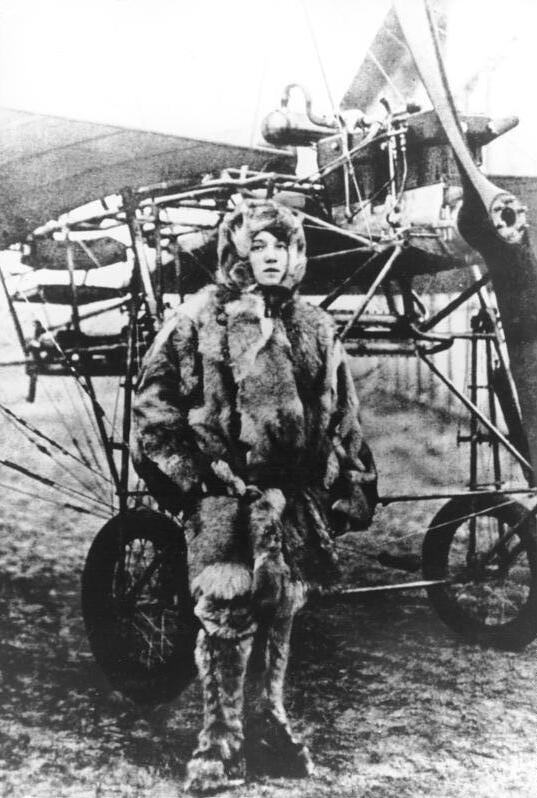
- Melli Beese in front of the Poulain monoplane by Beese and Charles Boutard in December 1911
- Born: Amelie Hedwig Beese; 13 September 1886; Dresden, German Empire
- Died: 21 December 1925 (aged 39); Berlin, Germany
- Other name: Melli Beese
- Occupation: aviator

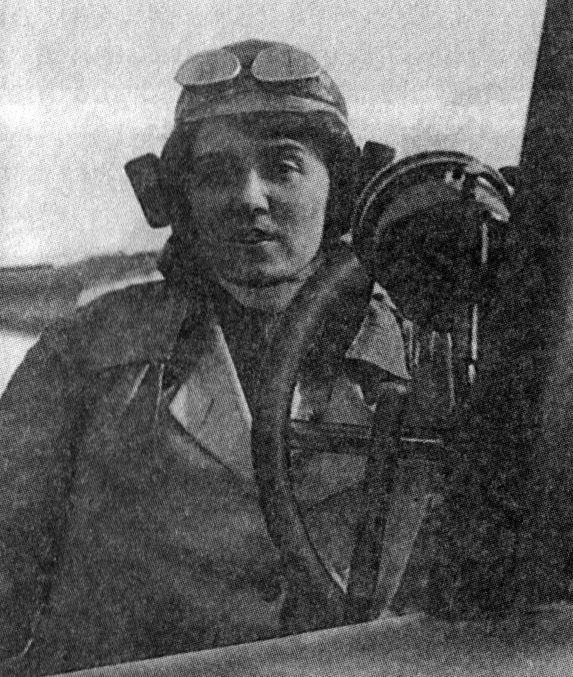
Melli Beese on a Rumpler-Taube in 1911

Amelie Hedwig Boutard-Beese (13 September 1886 – 21 December 1925), also known as Melli Beese, was the first female German pilot, qualifying in 1911, as well as the first such aircraft engineer. Together with Lilly Steinschneider and Marie Marvingt, she is considered one of the first female pioneers of aviation. To get there, however, she had to overcome many obstacles and fight the male-dominated bastion.

== Early life ==
Amelie Hedwig Beese was born in Dresden on 13 September 1886 to Alma Wilhemine Hedwig Beese and Friedrich Karl Richard Beese, an architect and master mason. She had a younger brother Edgar, and two half siblings from her father's first marriage, Hertha and Kurt. The family were comfortably off.

In 1906 Beese decided to pursue a career as a sculptor; however, she had to leave her native Germany to study, as German art schools did not admit female students. She studied instead at Stockholm's Royal Academy from 1906 until 1909, and created a number of works including a bronze bust of the painter Allan Egnell which has survived. She won a prize for a group sculpture, The Soccer Players. During this period, she learned to sail and developed an affinity for skiing.

When she returned to Dresden in 1909, her father built her a studio at the family's new home in Blasewitz. They discussed flying which was becoming known to the public in Germany, inspired by Louis Bleriot's much publicised flight from Calais to Dover in September 1909. It was during this period where she developed a desire to become a pilot. Her father encouraged her to attend Dresden's Politechnic School in preparation for becoming an aviator (hoping she would become bored by it) and she began studying mathematics, shipbuilding, and aeronautic engineering. Less than a year later, she had persuaded her father of her seriousness and he agreed to fund her studies and living expenses at a Berlin flying school.

== Interest in aviation ==
In November 1910 she traveled to Johannisthal, the first airfield to open in Berlin, managed by Georg von Tschudi. Here she encountered aviators from a variety of nations, and early aircraft building companies such as Rumpler, and began to search for an instructor. The students at Johannisthal gathered in the Cafe Senftleben and Beese joined them, although she was less welcome on the flying field itself where she struggled to get anyone to agree to teach her how to fly. Eventually Robert Thelen, the Norwegian chief of construction at a small start up aeroplane building company called Ad Astra, agreed to take her on as a student in any spare time he had. She was to work in the engineering shop for the rest of the time. In December 1910, Beese took her first flight with Thelen demonstrating how to fly. On 12 December, Beese' older sister Hertha von Grienberger came to watch her fly but a chain broke on the machine when in flight and there was a crash which horrified Hertha and left Beese with a badly injured foot, broken ribs, nose and leg bones. Beese let her parents know about the accident but her father died very soon afterwards of a heart attack and she returned to the family home. Beese was encouraged to give up flying by the family but returned to Johannisthal in January, although Thelen avoided her.

In 1911, regulations pertaining to the flight test were made more stringent, and Beese, at that point an inexperienced flier, found it increasingly difficult to persuade more experienced aviators to teach her.

Nevertheless, in May of that year she found a new instructor in Weimar, Robert Von Mossner, who allowed her to take complete control of an airplane for the first time, flying his Wright machine. Beese, encouraged by this flying experience, but disappointed at the time spent fixing up the old plane rather than flying it, sought to gain more flying time, and spoke with the director of Johannisthal to this end, returning there to an updated flying field. The director of Johannisthal Georg von Tschudi persuaded aircraft designer Edmund Rumpler to take Beese as a student.

Both men anticipated a stir in publicity if they allowed a female aviator to participate in the upcoming flight display, and so at the end of July 1911 Beese was allowed to fly unaided. She encountered several setbacks, including sabotage of her aircraft by other participating aviators who were concerned that women pilots would steal their thunder. However, she did participate in the flight display, flying a Rumpler-Taube, becoming the first female pilot in Germany on 13 September 1911, her twenty fifth birthday, and was awarded the German pilot's license No. 115.

== Flying school and aircraft development ==
1912 was an eventful year for Beese. Beese opened a flying school, the Melli Beese Flying School at Johannisthal airfield, with financial assistance from her mother and a Dresden businessman, Karl A. Lingner, and in partnership with Frenchman Charles Boutard and Hermann Reichelt. They bought three planes and Adolph Ludwig joined them as the school's mechanic. Boutard gained a German flying license on 4 April 1912 and helped Melli with teaching her pupils. The school had a good safety record but wasn't able to attract enough pupils, so Beese let Reichelt go.

In 1912, the German government developed a National Flying Donations scheme to raise money to develop aviation technology and training, having decided that aeroplanes had a military use and felt challenged by the fact that all the significant aviation records were held by the French. Beese hoped to benefit from this funding to develop her work, but as Boutard was French, their company could not legally be given work connected with the military. She felt that a new cutting edge plane would help attract pupils and used her early training in architecture to begin to design and patent a collapsible aircraft.

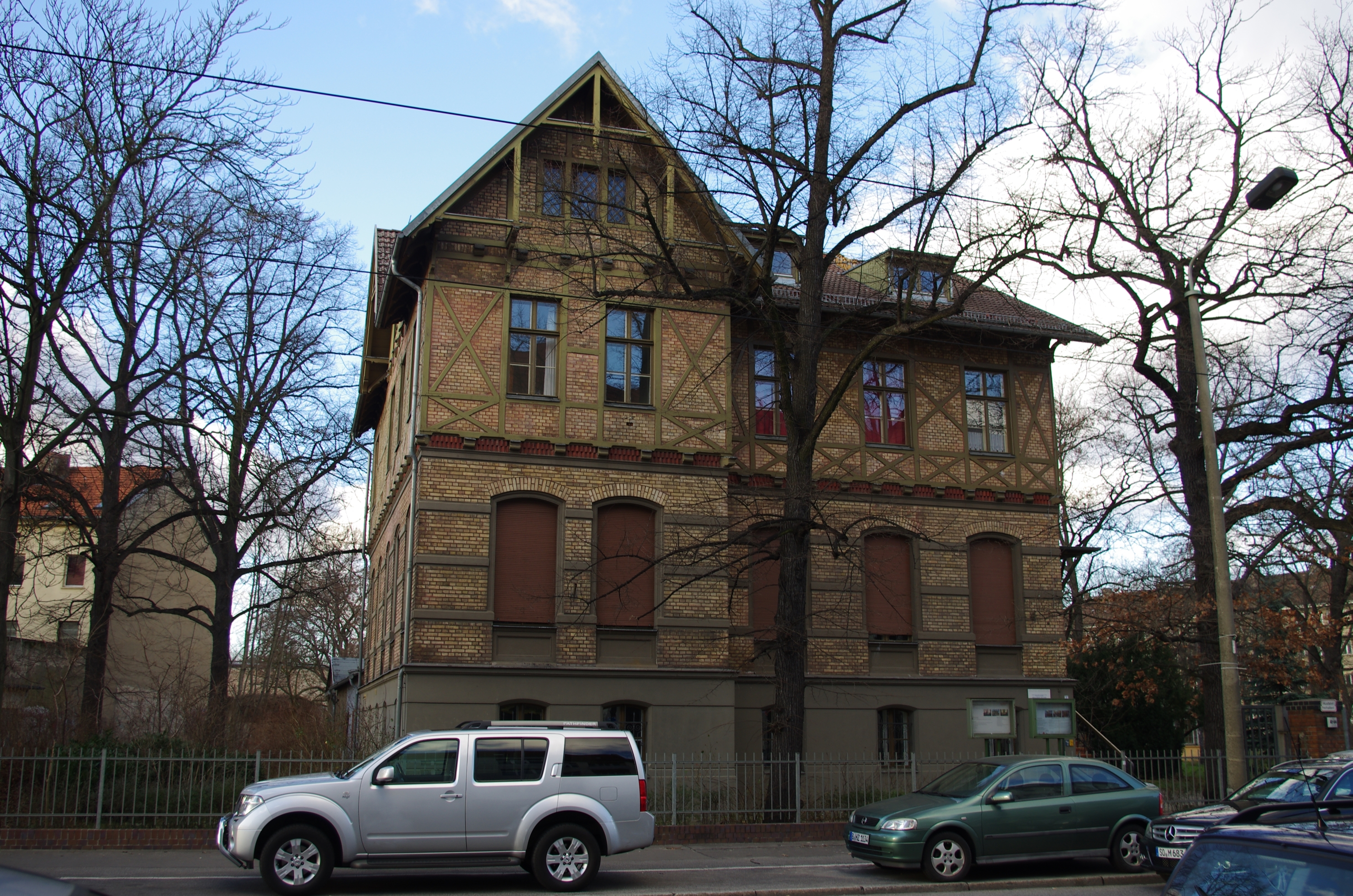
Sterndamm 82 – 84 Johannisthal, the home of Melli Beese and Charles Boutard

== World War I ==
She later worked with Charles Boutard on plans for a flying boat. Her relationship with Boutard became close, and the two married on 25 January 1913. The couple lived in the Trützschler Villa in what was then Kaiser-Wilhelm-Strasse 3–4 in Berlin-Johannisthal (today Sterndamm 82).

After marrying Boutard, and despite their remaining in Germany, Beese became a French national as a woman took on her husband's citizenship and lost her own when marrying a foreigner under German law at the time. This made her ineligible to work on German airfields or aircraft during the First World War. She was eventually arrested with her husband and tried as "undesirable aliens". Charles Boutard was interned and they moved to Wittstock for the duration of the war.

After the armistice between Germany and the allies was concluded, the Beese-Boutards filed suit on claims of compensation for goods confiscated upon Charles' internment. The lawsuits continued for most of the rest of her life, although the value of the claimed compensation decreased with the hyper-inflation that Germany suffered during the Weimar period. Despite the troubles suffered due to the ongoing lawsuits and the economic troubles suffered throughout Germany, Beese-Boutard planned to make a film documenting her flying. Some pieces were shot and still survive, and were included in a film made by Walter Jerven in 1940.

== Death ==
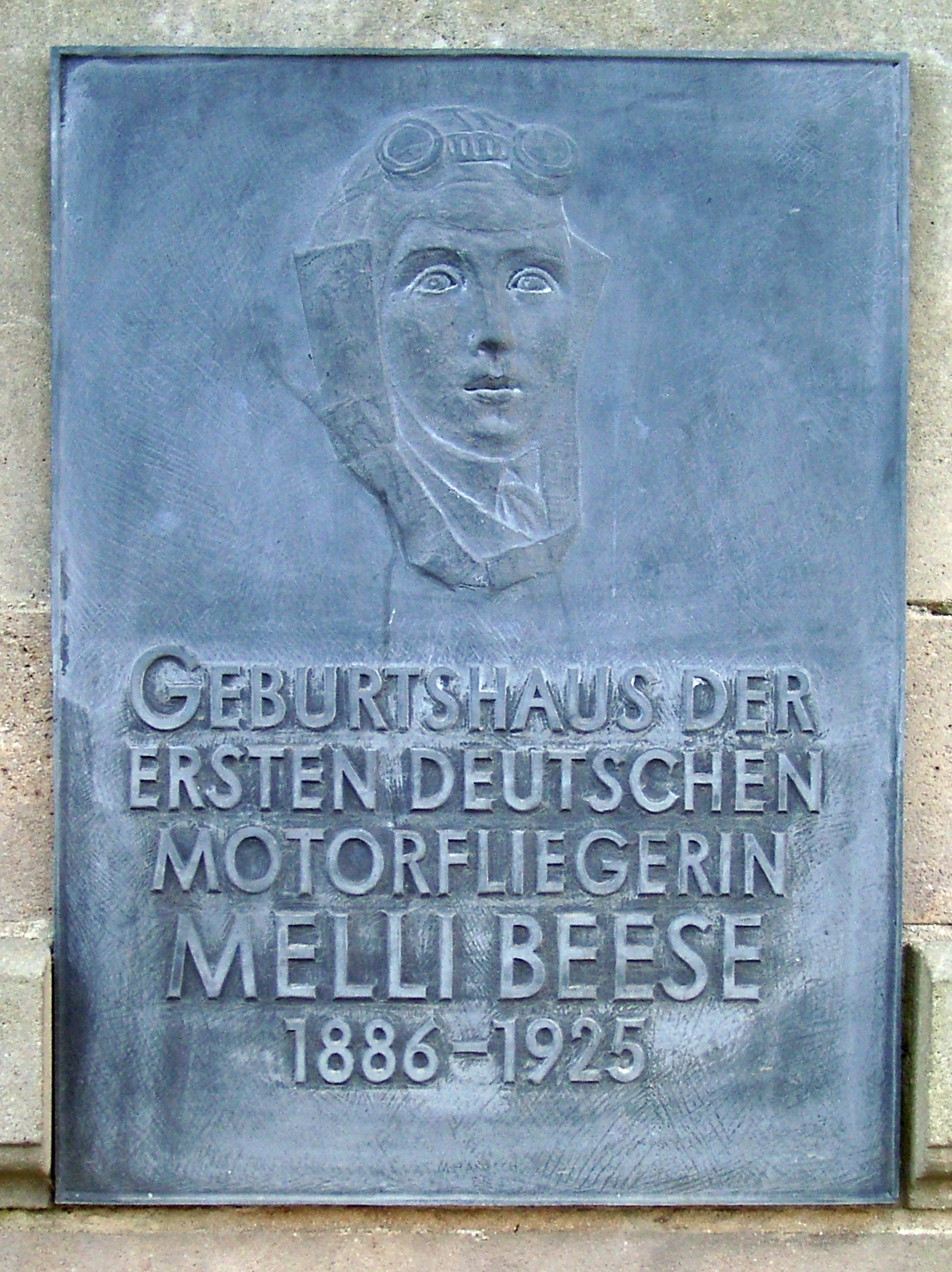
Commemorative plaque at the birthplace of Melli Beese in Dresden-Laubegast. The inscription reads "Birthplace of the first German female airplane pilot."

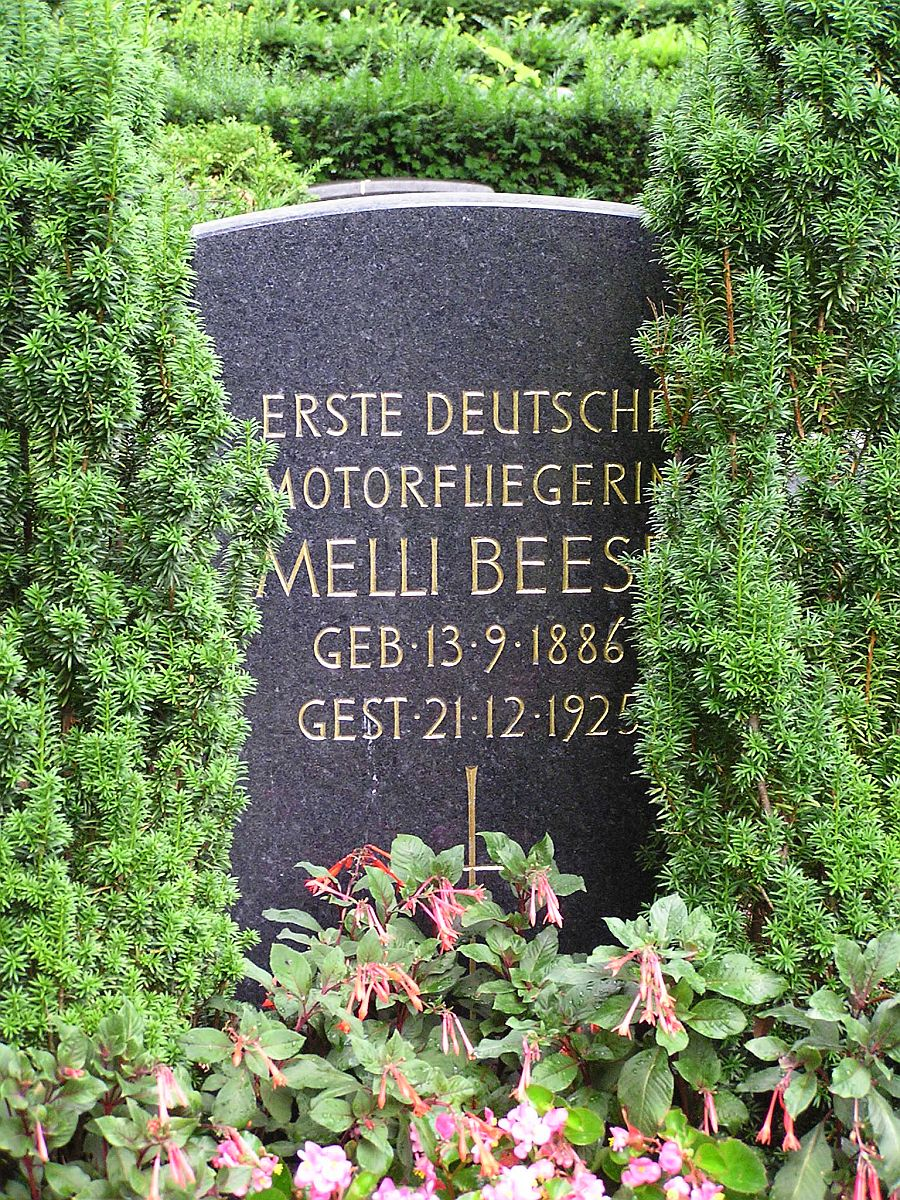
Melli Beese's grave

Beese's marriage deteriorated. By 1925, the couple had separated and Beese was living alone in Schmargendorf. Beese had an accident the same year, crashing the airplane she was flying when she reapplied for her pilot's license. On 21 December of that year, she shot herself in her Berlin flat. She is buried in the cemetery at Berlin-Schmargendorf.

== Legacy and commemoration ==
Johannisthal airfield, where Beese began her career as an aviator, has disappeared beneath the changing landscape of Berlin; there is no trace of it other than local street names such as Pilotenstraße and Segelfliegerstraße. There is a small memorial park named after her in Wilmersdorf, at the corner of Storckwinkel- and Schwarzbacherstraße.

In 1992, Straße 19 in Treptow was renamed Melli-Beese-Straße. An exhibition is dedicated to her in the Heimatmuseum in Treptow, in the eastern suburbs of Berlin. There is a Melli-Beese-Straße in Frankfurt – Bockenheim.

In 1993, the flying club Aeroclub Mellie Beese was formed in Berlin.

In 2004 the Tempelhof district of Berlin decided to name a pedestrian passage between Hoeppnerstraße and Hessenring the Melli-Beese-Promenade.

Beese's life was the inspiration for Aris Fioretos's 2020 novel Nelly B.s Herz.

A school near the former Johannisthal airfield is named after her, and the Berlin Airport access road is named Melli-Beese Ring.

== Literature ==
- Sehn, Dietmar: Dresdner Straßengeschichten. Wissenswertes, Unterhaltsames und Kurioses. Wartberg Verlag, Gudensberg-Gleichen 2006, ISBN 3-8313-1620-1.
- Spitzer, Barbara: Melli Beese. Bildhauerin, Pilotin – eine ungewöhnliche Frau. (Begleitband zur Ausstellung „Melli Beese, Bildhauerin, Pilotin – eine ungewöhnliche Frau“. 2. Juni 1992 bis 20. September 1992 im Heimatmuseum Treptow und 2. Oktober 1992 bis 13. November 1992 im Verkehrsmuseum Dresden, Berlin). Bezirksamt Treptow, Dresden 1992.
- Peter Supf (1953). "Beese, Amelie". Neue Deutsche Biographie (in German). Vol. 1. Berlin: Duncker & Humblot. p. 738. (full text online).
- Wittmann, Livia Käthe, Zibler, Barbara: Melli Beese und die „Flügel am Horizont“. Die Geschichte der ersten deutschen Pilotin. Trafo-Literaturverlag, Berlin 2009, ISBN 978-3-89626-814-3.

== Film ==
Die tollkühne Fliegerin Melli Beese – Das Schicksal der ersten deutschen Pilotin aus Dresden, TV-Dokumentation von Jörn E. Runge, MDR-Produktion (Lebensläufe, Folge 87), 2005. https://www.imdb.com/title/tt0880194
