= Thomas Rosenlöcher =

German writer (1947–2022)

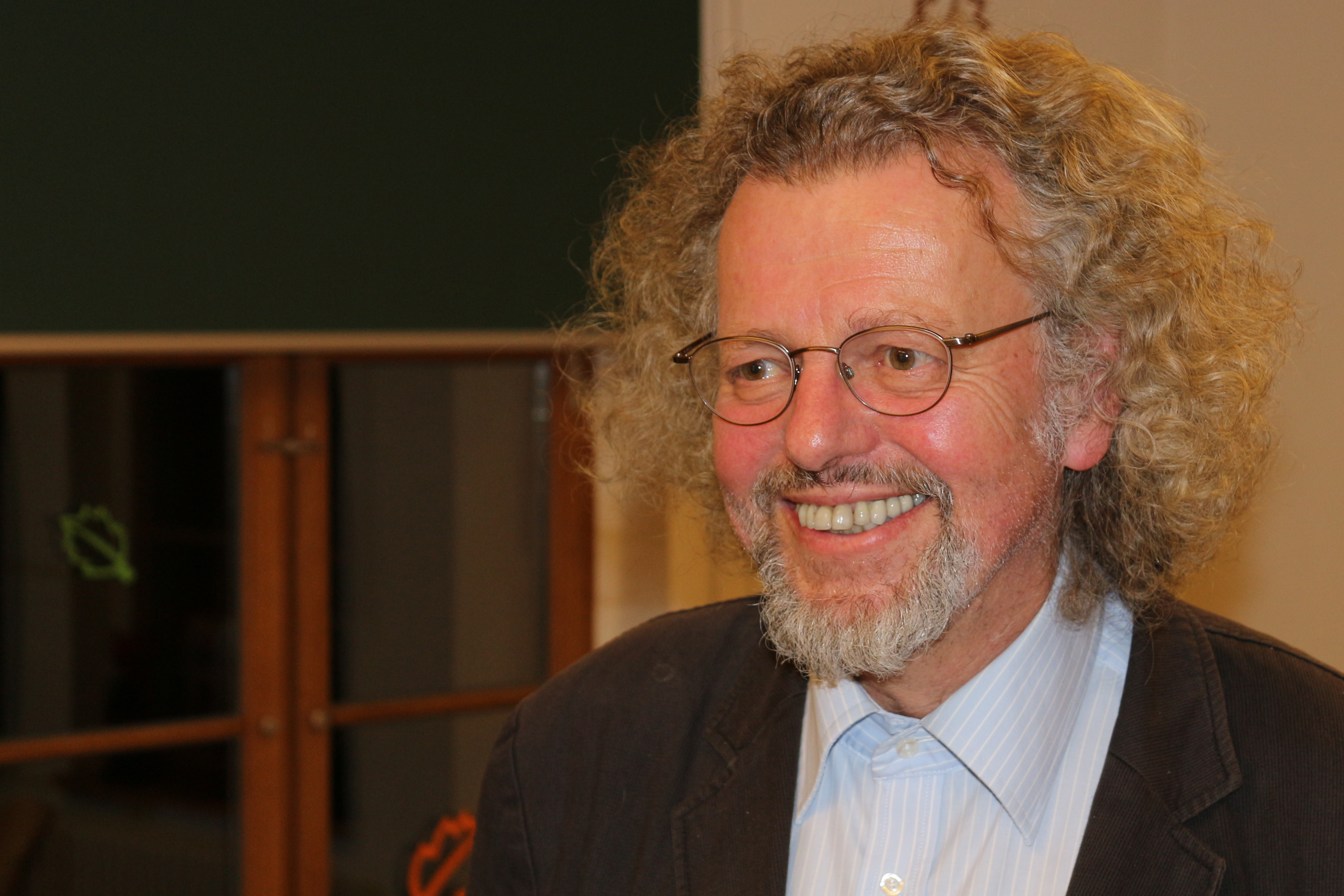
- Born: 29 July 1947; Dresden, Saxony, Allied-occupied Germany
- Died: 13 April 2022 (aged 74); Kreischa, Saxony, Germany
- Occupation(s): Writer, poet
- Awards: Stadtschreiber von Bergen (2010)

Thomas Rosenlöcher (29 July 1947 – 13 April 2022) was a German writer and poet.
