= Robert Thelen =

German aviation pioneer and designer

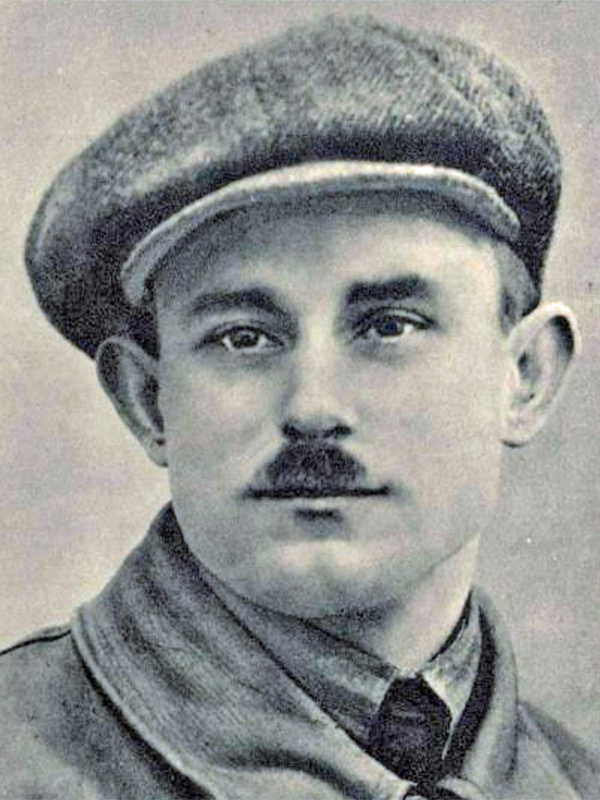
- Robert Thelen (Flugsport 1911, No. 13)
- Born: 23 March 1884; Nuremberg
- Occupations: Aircraft pilot, engineer

Robert Thelen (23 March 1884, Nürnberg – 23 February 1968, Berlin) was a German aviation pioneer and designer.

He was a chief designer of Albatros Flugzeugwerke, responsible among other for Albatros C.I design.

He was the first person to give flying lessons to Melli Beese, the first female German pilot.
