= Tilman Spengler =

German sinologist (born 1947)

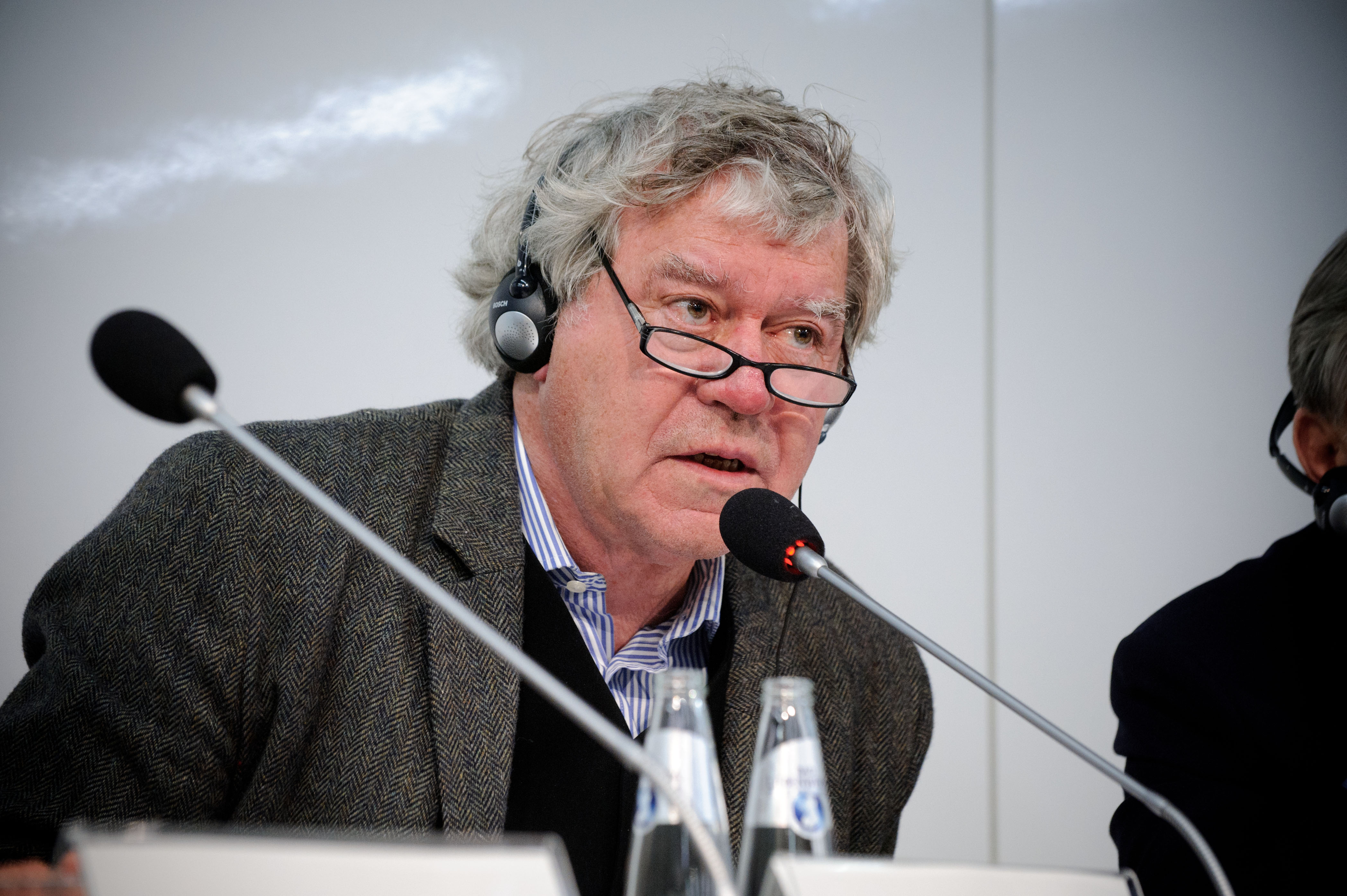
Spengler in 2011

Tilman Spengler (born 1947) is a German sinologist, writer, and journalist. The author of more than a dozen books, including Lenin's Brain (1993), he has received several literary prizes throughout his career, including:

- 1999 Mainzer Stadtschreiber
- 2003 Ernst-Hoferichter-Preis
- 2008 Literaturpreis der Stadt München

He is the great-nephew of German philosopher Oswald Spengler and the second husband of actress Daphne Wagner, great-grandson of German composer Richard Wagner.
