= Katja Lange-Müller =

German writer (born 1951)

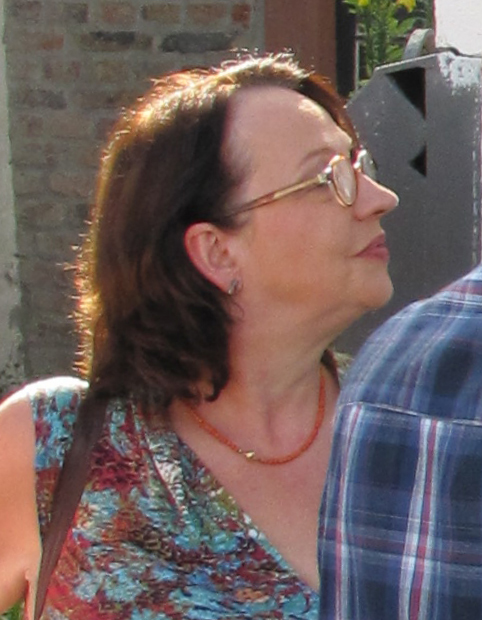
Katja Lange-Müller

Katja Lange-Müller (born 13 February 1951) is a German writer living in Berlin. Her works include several short stories and novellas, radio dramas, and dramatic works.

The daughter of Inge Lange, an East German party functionary, Katja Lange-Müller was born in Berlin-Lichtenberg. She was expelled from school at the age of 17 for "unsocialist" behavior. From an early age, she and her circle of friends were carefully watched by the Stasi. Prevented from attending college, she first learned to be a typesetter, and later worked as a nurse in a psychiatric clinic. At the age of 28, she was accepted to the "Johannes R. Becher" Literature Institute in Leipzig, marking the beginning of her career as a writer.

== Works ==
- Lange-Müller, Katja (1986). Wehleid—wie im Leben : Erzählungen (in German). Frankfurt am Main: S. Fischer. ISBN 3-596-22347-4. OCLC 15255045.
- —— (1988). Kasper Mauser, die Feigheit vorm Freund : Erzählung (in German). Köln: Kiepenheuer & Witsch. ISBN 3-462-01895-7. OCLC 18238922.
- —— (2009). Verfrühte Tierliebe (in German). Frankfurt, M. ISBN 978-3-596-18164-3. OCLC 318642371.
- —— (1997). Bahnhof Berlin. München: Deutscher Taschenbuch Verlag. ISBN 3-423-08392-1. OCLC 38075373.
- —— (2000). Die Letzten : Aufzeichnungen aus Udo Posbichs Druckerei (in German). Köln: Kiepenheuer & Witsch. ISBN 3-462-02929-0. OCLC 45284971.
- ——; Henze, Volker; Scheib, Hans (1999). Stille Post : Volker Henze, sechzehn Bilder : Hans Scheib, sechzehn Figuren; Kunsthalle Vierseithof in Luckenwalde, Okt./Nov. 1999; Leonhardi-Museum, Dresden, März/April 2001 (in German). Schwetzingen: Ed. Rothes Haus. ISBN 3-933495-05-9. OCLC 163821545.
- —— (2002). Vom Fisch bespuckt : neue Erzählungen von 37 deutschsprachigen Autorinnen und Autoren (in German). Köln: Kiepenheuer & Witsch. ISBN 3-462-03073-6. OCLC 50418111.
- ——; Jörg, Ingrid (2002). Der süsse Käfer und der saure Käfer (in German). [Berlin]: Berliner Handpresse. OCLC 828869240.
- Maron, Jonas; Lange-Müller, Katja; Maron, Monika (2002). Was weiss die Katze vom Sonntag? : Fotografien (in German). Berlin: Nicolai. ISBN 3-87584-193-X. OCLC 50052966.
- Lange-Müller, Katja (2006). Die Enten, die Frauen und die Wahrheit Erzählungen und Miniaturen (in German). Frankfurt am Main. ISBN 978-3-596-15624-5. OCLC 181456979.
- —— (2007). Böse Schafe : Roman (in German). Köln: Kiepenheuer & Witsch. ISBN 978-3-462-03914-6. OCLC 166334136.
- —— (2016). Drehtür Roman (in German). Köln: Verlag Kiepenheuer & Witsch. ISBN 978-3-462-04934-3. OCLC 950026786.

== Awards ==
- Ingeborg Bachmann Prize, 1986
- Alfred Döblin Prize, 1995
- Berlin Literature Prize, 1996
- Preis der SWR-Bestenliste, 2001
- Mainzer Stadtschreiber of the city Mainz and the television station ZDF, 2002
- Roswitha Prize of the city Bad Gandersheim, 2002
- Kassel Literary Prize, 2005
- Kleist Prize, 2013
- Thomas Mann Prize, 2025

=== Memberships ===
- 2000 Deutsche Akademie für Sprache und Dichtung, Darmstadt
- 2002 Academy of Arts, Berlin
- 2022 PEN Berlin
