= Ernst-Wilhelm Händler =

German novelist and entrepreneur

- Born: 26 March 1953 (age 73); Munich, West Germany
- Education: Dr. rer. pol. (1980)
- Occupations: Novelist, entrepreneur
- Writing career
- Language: German
- Genres: Novel, short story, essay
- Notable works: Fall (1997); Wenn wir sterben (2002); Der Überlebende (2013); Das Geld spricht (2019); Der absolute Feind (2023)
- Notable awards: Erik-Reger-Preis (1999); Preis der SWR-Bestenliste (2003); Hans-Erich-Nossack-Preis (2006)

Ernst-Wilhelm Händler (born 26 March 1953) is a German novelist and entrepreneur. He ran his family's business in Cham, Bavaria, from the 1980s until 2004, and wrote his early fiction during that time.

Händler made his writing debut in 1995 with the story collection Stadt mit Häusern which was later published in English as City with Houses. He has since published ten novels and two books of cultural theory. Wenn wir sterben (2002) won the Preis der SWR-Bestenliste, and Welt aus Glas (2009) and München (2016) were longlisted for the German Book Prize. He has also received the Erik-Reger-Preis (1999) and the Hans-Erich-Nossack-Preis (2006), and in 2014 he became a member of the Academy of Sciences and Literature.

== Life and career ==
Händler was born on 26 March 1953 in Munich. After passing his Abitur at the Albert-Einstein-Gymnasium in 1972, he studied at the University of Stuttgart and then at LMU Munich. He was trained as an economist and a philosopher and in 1980 completed a doctorate in economics (Dr. rer. pol.). He then joined the family business in Cham.

Händler began writing fiction while still running the company. He had written his first novel, Kongreß, by the late 1980s, and it was due to appear from Greno Verlag in 1989, but could not be published due to the publisher's bankruptcy. He later drew on the episode in his novel Fall, in which a publisher's bankruptcy likewise stops an author's first book from appearing. His first book, the story collection Stadt mit Häusern, was published in 1995. It was later translated into English by Martin Klebes as City with Houses and published by Northwestern University Press in 2001. Kongreß was eventually published in 1996, with a different publisher. The novel is set in the philosophy department of LMU Munich (University of Munich). It was followed by Fall (1997), set in the business world, and Sturm (1999), a novel about an architect. His next novel, Wenn wir sterben (2002), topped the SWR-Bestenliste, the monthly critics' list of Südwestrundfunk, in November 2002 and won the list's annual prize in 2003. Two more novels followed, Die Frau des Schriftstellers (2006) and Welt aus Glas (2009). The latter was longlisted for the German Book Prize.

Händler sold the family company in 2004 and has since been involved in property development. His novel Der Überlebende (2013) is narrated by an engineer obsessed with building intelligent robots. It was followed by München. Gesellschaftsroman (2016), set in Munich high society, which was longlisted for the German Book Prize, and by Das Geld spricht (2019), set among Frankfurt bankers and hedge fund managers. Der absolute Feind (2023) moves to the international art market. Alongside these novels he published two books of cultural theory, Versuch über den Roman als Erkenntnisinstrument (2014) and Die Produktion von Gesellschaft (2022).

== Writing ==
Händler's fiction deals mainly with the German economy and working life, which he treats through reference to the reading, myths, voices and rhetoric of other writers. He has criticised German-language literature for depicting capitalism only from the point of view of those at the bottom and writes his own books to show the view from the above. Bernd Blaschke has written that all of Händler's novels are also stories of violence, with violent scenes running through their matter-of-fact surface.

The writer Robert Habeck described Händler's novels as marked by frequent changes of narrative perspective, breaks in the flow of the story and the use of many specialist languages, giving the impression of an author writing in many voices. In Wenn wir sterben, a novel about businesswomen at the head of a company, one of whom outmanoeuvres the others, each character has a narrative style of her own.

Händler's writing has been compared with that of Hermann Broch, William Gaddis and Robert Musil. Martin Lüdke of Die Zeit compared him to Hermann Broch as a writer who uses fiction as a means of understanding, and Stephan Maus of Literaturkritik placed Wenn wir sterben alongside William Gaddis's J R as a novel that captures the workings of the economy in an original form. Helmut Böttiger compared the novel's mixing of scientific and literary language with that of Robert Musil's The Man Without Qualities. Gunther Nickel of the Literaturblatt für Baden-Württemberg also compared Händler with Musil, writing that Händler's writing explores what he calls a "space of possibility" instead of mirroring reality.

== Reception ==
Jochen Hörisch, writing in Cicero, found Die Frau des Schriftstellers (2006) complex and gripping, and called it a successful attempt to explore what literature can do. Hajo Steinert of Die Welt, who had called Wenn wir sterben a masterpiece, found that the book's many layers made it more complicated and tedious than it deserved to be, and thought it would have been better at half the length.

Richard Kämmerlings of Die Welt called Der Überlebende (2013) a great and disturbing novel. Comparing it with Rainald Goetz's Johann Holtrop (2012), he found Händler's narrative stance clearer and more convincing. Dirk Knipphals of Deutschlandfunk Kultur was more reserved. He called the novel an impressive literary puzzle, but doubted that its Faustian theme of a pact with the devil could capture the human condition today, and thought the narrator's long self-justification might leave readers cold.

Christoph Schröder of Zeit Online identified control as the central theme of München (2016) and praised its aesthetic consistency. Hans-Peter Kunisch of the Süddeutsche Zeitung found the main characters sterile and one-dimensional, and argued that by confining itself to the milieu that regards itself as Munich's better society, the book failed both as a society novel and as a novel of the city. Christian Metz of Deutschlandfunk read Der absolute Feind (2023) as a new round in the long contest between literature and the visual arts.

== Awards ==
- 1999 - Erik-Reger-Preis, Zukunftsinitiative Rheinland-Pfalz
- 2003 - Preis der SWR-Bestenliste, Südwestrundfunk
- 2003 - Kulturpreis der Stadt Regensburg, City of Regensburg
- 2004 - Friedrich-Baur-Preis for literature, Bavarian Academy of Fine Arts
- 2006 - Hans-Erich-Nossack-Preis, Kulturkreis der deutschen Wirtschaft im BDI
- 2014 - Member, Academy of Sciences and Literature, Mainz

== Selected works ==
- Händler, Ernst-Wilhelm (1995). Stadt mit Häusern (in German). Frankfurt am Main: Frankfurter Verlagsanstalt. ISBN 978-3-627-00033-2.
- Händler, Ernst-Wilhelm (1997). Fall (in German). Frankfurt am Main: Frankfurter Verlagsanstalt. ISBN 978-3-627-00031-8.
- Händler, Ernst-Wilhelm (2002). Wenn wir sterben (in German). Frankfurt am Main: Frankfurter Verlagsanstalt. ISBN 978-3-627-00029-5.
- Händler, Ernst-Wilhelm (2009). Welt aus Glas (in German). Frankfurt am Main: Frankfurter Verlagsanstalt. ISBN 978-3-627-00027-1.
- Händler, Ernst-Wilhelm (2013). Der Überlebende (in German). Frankfurt am Main: S. Fischer. ISBN 978-3-10-029910-9.
- Händler, Ernst-Wilhelm (2016). München. Gesellschaftsroman (in German). Frankfurt am Main: S. Fischer. ISBN 978-3-10-397207-8.
- Händler, Ernst-Wilhelm (2023). Der absolute Feind (in German). Frankfurt am Main: S. Fischer. ISBN 978-3-10-397560-4.
