= Michael Ferrier =

French writer, novelist and essayist

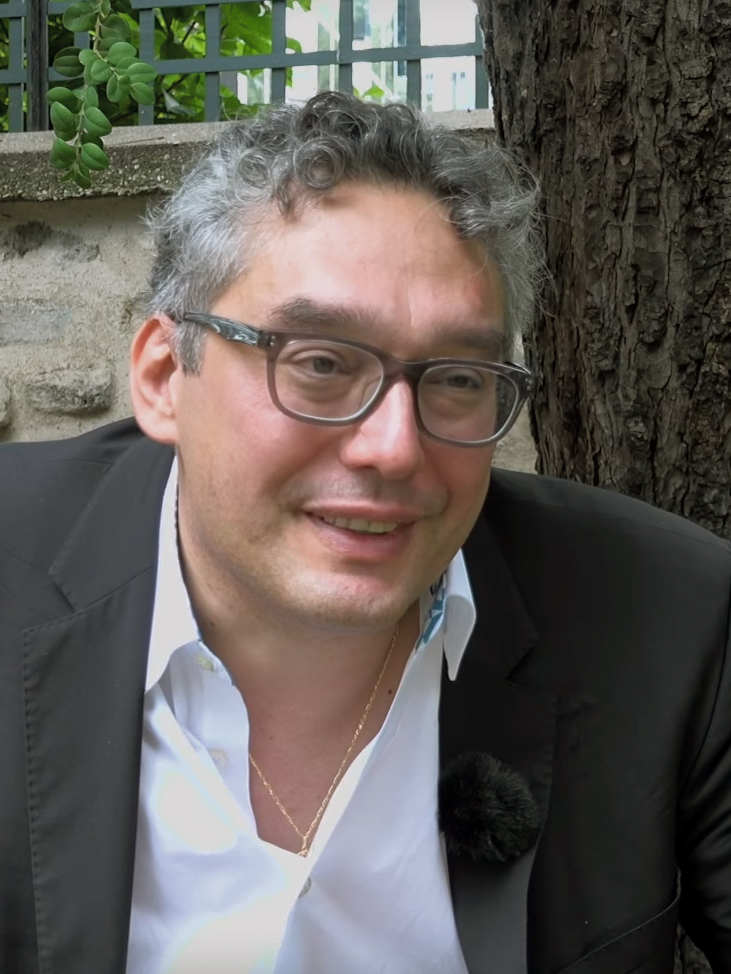
Michaël Ferrier (2018)

Michaël Ferrier (born 14 August 1967) is a French writer, novelist and essayist, living in Tokyo.

== Biography ==
Ferrier was born in Strasbourg. He comes from a French family and also from Mauritian Creole people and Réunion Creole people, with Indian, French, Malagasy and British origins. After a nomadic childhood (Africa and Indian Ocean), he gained entrance to the highly selective École Normale Supérieure, at the age of 18, where he passed the agrégation in literature (highest teaching diploma in France) and graduated from the University of Paris. He is currently Professor at Chuo University, Tokyo, Japan, and director of the Research Group Figures de l'Etranger (In the face of alterity: The image of the Other in arts and society).

== Works ==
Ferrier has published several novels and essays, whose interdisciplinary work (in the fields of literature, art, music and philosophy) includes several books on Japan, which has become a standard reference in the field. His first novel, Tokyo, petits portraits de l’aube, Gallimard, 2004, has been awarded the Prix Littéraire de l’Asie 2005 (Literary Prize from the Association of French Language Writers and the French Minister of Foreign Affairs). His novel Sympathie pour le Fantôme (Gallimard, 2010) portrays multiple voices (Ambroise Vollard, Jeanne Duval and Edmond Albius) and embraces the contradictions and complexity of French national identity. It has been awarded the Prix littéraire de la Porte Dorée (Literary prize of Cité nationale de l'histoire de l'immigration, the French museum of immigration). His book about Fukushima is a major study of the earthquake, the tsunami and the nuclear accident, that has roused the interest of writers and philosophers like Philippe Sollers and Jean-Luc Nancy (Fukushima, récit d'un désastre, Gallimard, 2012). Universities have held conferences on his work (the University of Edinburgh, 2017, the University of Tohoku and the University of London, 2019), and Ferrier is the recipient of numerous literary awards and honors, among them the 2012 Prix Edouard Glissant and one of France's premier literary awards, the 2018 Prix Décembre.

== Awards and honours ==
Michaël Ferrier was shortlisted three times for the Prix Femina.

- 2005 Prix littéraire de l'Asie
- 2010 Prix littéraire de la Porte Dorée
- 2012 Edouard Glissant Prize
- 2015 Franz-Hessel-Preis
- 2018 Prix Décembre for François, portrait d’un absent
- 2020 Prix Jacques Lacarrière for Scrabble, une enfance tchadienne

== Works ==
Novels translated in English

- Scrabble : une enfance tchadienne, Mercure de France, Collection Traits et Portraits, 2019 = Scrabble, A Chadian Childhood, translated by Martin Munro, Liverpool University Press, 2022
- Mémoires d'Outre-Mer, Gallimard, 2015 = Over Seas of Memory, translated by Martin Munro, foreword by Patrick Chamoiseau, University of Nebraska Press, 2019
- François, portrait d'un absent, Gallimard, 2018 = François, Portrait of an Absent Friend, translated by Martin Munro, Fum d'Estampa Press, 2023

Novels (in French)

- Tokyo, petits portraits de l’aube, Éditions Gallimard, 2004
- Kizu, Ed. Arléa, 2004
- Sympathie pour le Fantôme, Gallimard, 2010
- Fukushima, récit d'un désastre, Gallimard, 2012
- François, portrait d'un absent, Gallimard, 2018
- Ce qui nous arrive , with Michaël Ferrier, Camille Ammoun, Ersi Sotiropoulou, Fawzi Zebian and Makenzy Orcel, with a preface by Charif Majdalani, Editions Inculte, 2022

Essays

- Louis-Ferdinand Céline et la chanson, Ed. du Lerot, 2004
- La Tentation de la France, la Tentation du Japon, Picquier, 2003
- Le Goût de Tokyo, anthology, Mercure de France, 2008
- Japon: la Barrière des rencontres, Ed. Cécile Defaut, 2009
- Penser avec Fukushima (sous la direction de C. Doumet et M. Ferrier), Nantes, Editions nouvelles Cécile Defaut, 2016
- Naufrage (about COVID-19 pandemic), Gallimard, Collection Tracts, 2020
- Dans l'oeil du désastre : créer avec Fukushima, sous la direction de Michaël Ferrier, éd. Thierry Marchaisse, 2021 ISBN 978-2-36280-254-6, with Makoto Aida, Takashi Arai, Chim↑Pom, Marie Drouet, Hikaru Fujii, Thierry Girard, Yoi Kawakubo, Jacques Kraemer, Hélène Lucien, Bruno Meyssat, Chihiro Minato, Yoann Moreau, Brigitte Mounier, Kôhei Nawa, Shinji Ohmaki, Marc Pallain, Claude-Julie Parisot, Gil Rabier, Noi Sawaragi, Nobuhiro Suwa, Kota Takeuchi, Kenichi Watanabe, Yukinori Yanagi.
- Notre ami l'atome (Our friend the Atom, cinematographic writings), Paris, Gallimard, 2021

Screenplay - Movies

- The World after Fukushima, coproduction Arte/Kami Productions (Japan, 2013, 77 min)
- Nuclear Lands, A History of Plutonium, coproduction Arte/Seconde Vague Productions/Kami Productions (France, 2015, 83 min)
- Our Friend The Atom, coproduction Arte/Radio Télévision Suisse/Kami Productions (France, 2019, 55 min)

The three films written by Michaël Ferrier and directed by Kenichi Watanabe were published by Éditions Gallimard in 2021:Notre ami l'atome (Our friend the Atom), Paris, Gallimard, 2021.

Texts in English

- « Creole Japan; or, the Vagaries of Creolization », Small Axe, vol 14, number 3 33, Durham, Duke University Press, 2010
- A special issue about Japanese photography in art press, the international review of contemporary art, contains two interviews with Japanese photographers: « Chihiro Minato: Only Once » and « Japanese photography: In Tokyo with Araki », art press, number 353, 2009
- « Setouchi. Japan's Festival of the Inland Sea », art press, number 371, 2010 (about the Contemporary Art Festival curated by Fram Kitagawa)
- « Art, eroticism and cannibalism in Japan », art press2, number 20, 2011
- « Visualizing the Impossible: Art after Fukushima», art press, number 423, 2015
- « Nature and Creation in Japanese Aesthetics », Wabi Sabi Shima, Of the Aesthetics of Perfection and Chaos in the Japanese Archipelago, Thalie Art Foundation editions, 2015
- « France-Japan: The Coral Writers (From stereotype to prototype, in favor of rethinking a critical approach to Japan) », Contemporary French & Francophone Studies, Volume 21, 2017 - Issue 1: France-Asia, p. 8-27.
