= Karl Ude =

German journalist (1906–1997)

Karl Kurt Friedrich Ude (14 January 1906 – 1 April 1997) was a German journalist and writer.

== Life ==
Born in Düsseldorf, Ude came from a family of white-collar workers. He originally studied protestant theology, but also philosophy, German studies, theatre studies, history of art and historical musicology at the Rheinische Friedrich-Wilhelms-Universität Bonn, the Philipps-Universität Marburg and Paris. Attracted by Schwabing cultural life and Munich as the "capital of the movement", he settled in Munich in 1926, where he heard among others lectures with Artur Kutscher, who later also became one of his friends. Ude worked as literature and theatre critic for various Munich newspapers. From 1946, he was a member of the editorial board of the Süddeutsche Zeitung, and from 1949 to 1973 he was an influential figure in Munich literary life as editor-in-chief of the literary magazine Welt und Wort. Ude and his wife Renée Madeleine, née Guggisberg are the parents of the former Mayor of Munich Christian Ude.

In addition to his journalistic work, Ude has published narrative works and edited anthologies on the subject of Munich. Among others, he received the following awards: the medal München leuchtet in 1966 and 1986, the Toucan Prize in 1967, the Ernst-Hoferichter-Preis, the Federal Cross of Merit on Ribbon in 1976, and the Schwabing Art Prize in 1977.

The Bund für Geistesfreiheit Bavaria accused Ude - but without elaborating - of having an approving attitude towards the Nazi book burnings in 1933.

The Munich author Johann Türk has collected approximately 5,000 articles by Ude published before May 1945 from 20 newspapers for which Ude wrote as a Munich correspondent from 1933 to 1945. According to Türk, in 80 per cent of these articles, Ude engaged in "partly nasty Nazi propaganda".

== Work ==
- Das Ringen um die Franziscus-Legende, Munich 1932
- Hier Quack!, Freiburg 1933
- Schelme und Hagestolze, Mühlacker 1940
- Vergnüglicher Stellungswechsel. Heitere Bilder von allen Waffengattungen des Heeres. Hugendubel, Munich 1942 (together with Klaus Kuhn). Was placed on the List of literature to be discarded after the end of the war in the Soviet Occupation Zone (SOZ).
- Die Pferde auf Elsenhöhe. Arbeitsgemeinschaft für Zeitgeschichte, München 1943. Was put on the list of literature to be discarded in the SOZ after the end of the war.
- Die Rettung, Munich 1943
- Das Rollschuhlaufbüchlein, Bad Wörishofen 1948
- Vierzehn Tännlein zuviel, Tübingen 1948
- Abenteuer im Dezember, Gütersloh 1955
- Damals, als wir Rollschuh liefen, Munich 1956
- Frank Wedekind, Mühlacker 1966
- Fernsprechtechnik als Lebensaufgabe, Munich 1981
- Schwabing von innen, Munich 2002

== Editorship ==
- Josef Pembaur, Munich 1940 (published with Otto A. Graef)
- Hier schreibt München, Munich 1961
- Besondere Kennzeichen, Munich 1964
- Artur Kutscher: Wedekind, Munich 1964
- Denk ich an München, Munich 1966 (published with Hermann Proebst)
- Ernst Hoferichter: Das Ernst-Hoferichter-Buch, Rosenheim 1977
