= Dahomey (film) =

2024 documentary film by Mati Diop

- Theatrical release poster
- Directed by: Mati Diop
- Written by: Mati Diop
- Produced by: Mati Diop; Eve Robin; Judith Lou Lévy
- Cinematography: Joséphine Drouin-Viallard
- Edited by: Gabriel Gonzalez
- Music by: Wally Badarou; Dean Blunt
- Production companies: Les Films du Bal; Fanta Sy; Arte France Cinéma
- Distributed by: Les Films du Losange (France); Sudu Connexion (Africa); Mubi (Worldwide)
- Release dates: 18 February 2024 (Berlinale); 11 September 2024 (France)
- Running time: 68 minutes
- Countries: France; Senegal; Benin
- Languages: French, Fon
- Box office: $565,958

Dahomey is a 2024 documentary film directed by Mati Diop. It is a dramatised account of 26 royal treasures from the Kingdom of Dahomey (in modern-day Benin), which were held in a museum in France. The film explores how the artifacts were returned from France to Benin, and the reactions of Beninese people. The film was an international co-production between companies in France, Senegal, and Benin.

The film had its world premiere at the main competition of the 74th Berlin International Film Festival, where it won the festival's top prize, the Golden Bear. It was released theatrically in France on 11 September 2024, by Les Films du Losange, to critical acclaim. It was named one of the Top 5 Documentary Films of 2024 by the National Board of Review.

It was also selected as the Senegalese entry for Best International Feature Film at the 97th Academy Awards, where it was shortlisted in two categories: Documentary Feature Film and International Feature Film.

== Contents ==
The documentary film blends facts and fiction to narrate the stories of 26 African artworks. The royal artefacts from the Kingdom of Dahomey (1600–1904) were taken to France during the region's colonial period (1872–1960). In the 21st century, they were put on display in the Musée du Quai Branly – Jacques Chirac, a museum of non-European art located in Paris. Following a campaign for repatriation, the artefacts were returned to Benin.

Among the returned works were statues of two kings of Dahomey, Glele and Béhanzin. Their throne, which had been seized by French soldiers in 1892, was also given back. The art pieces are now displayed in a museum in Abomey, the old royal city, about 65 miles from the Gulf of Guinea.

The film includes a discussion by students at the University of Abomey-Calavi, presenting their views on the repatriation of cultural assets. Some of the students criticise the Paris museum for returning only 26 of the 7,000 worldwide ethnographic objects it holds.

A prominent role in the film is given to the 26th art object to be repatriated, a statue that represents King Ghézo, who ruled from 1818 to 1859, shown below. A voice-over by the Haitian writer Makenzy Orcel (who wrote this part of the script), playing the object, tells of the time it spent in storage at the Paris museum, its memories of Africa and thoughts of returning to its homeland.

The Kingdom of Dahomey around 1894, superimposed on a map of the modern-day Republic of Benin, in the region of West Africa.

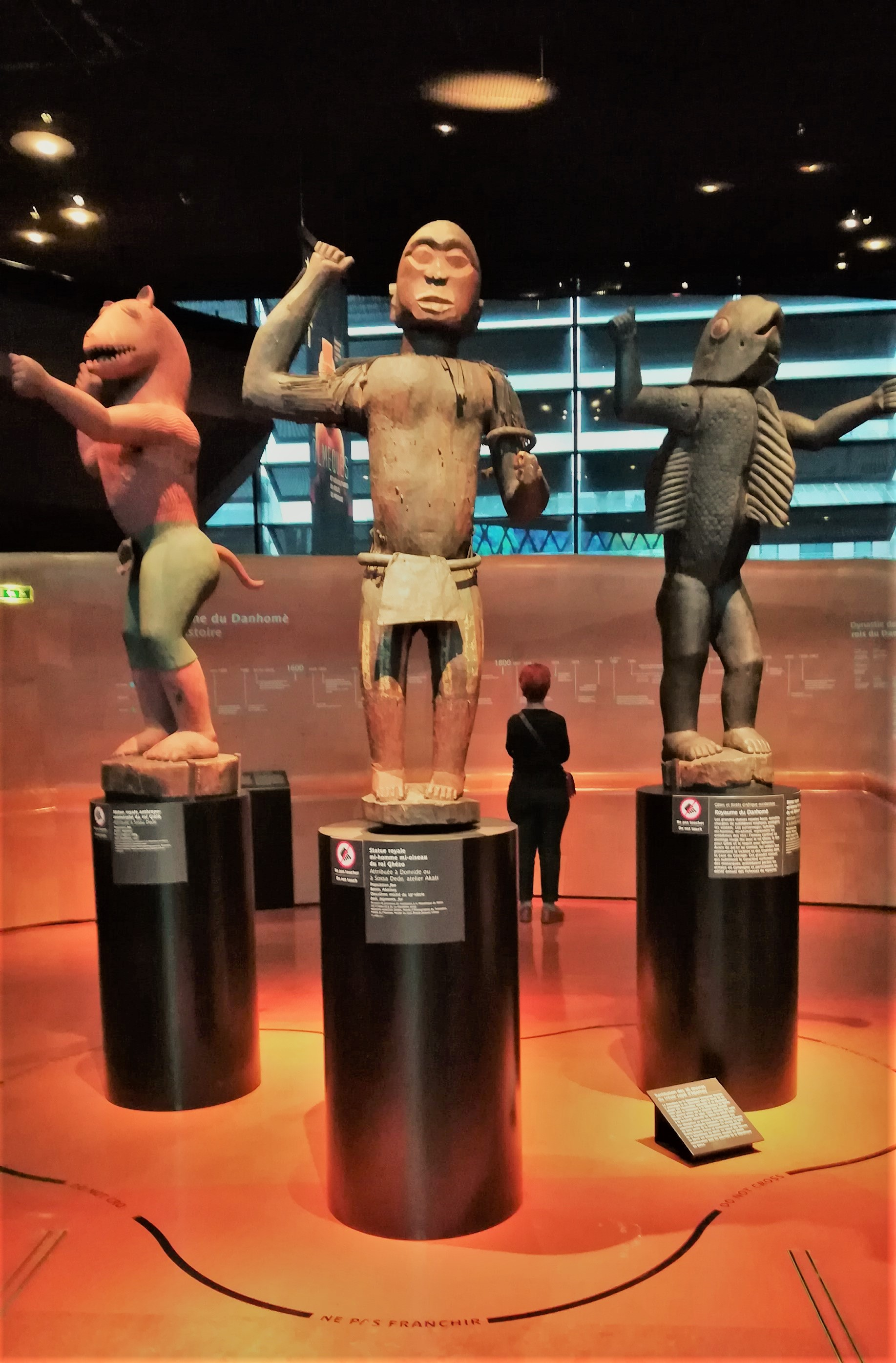
Three royal sculptures in the Quai Branly museum in May 2021 before their restitution

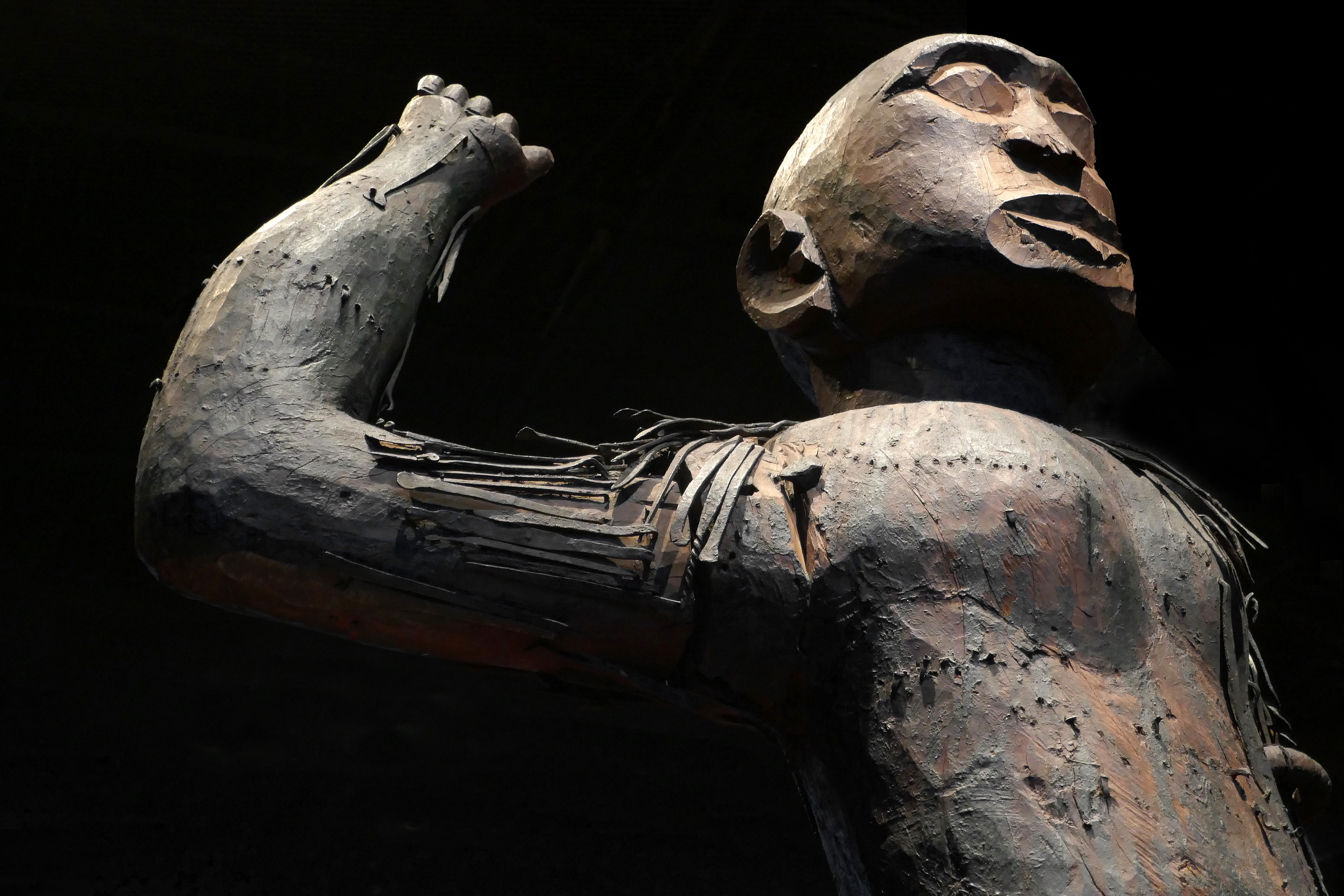
Statue of King Ghézo (art object number 26) at the Quai Branly Museum

== Production ==
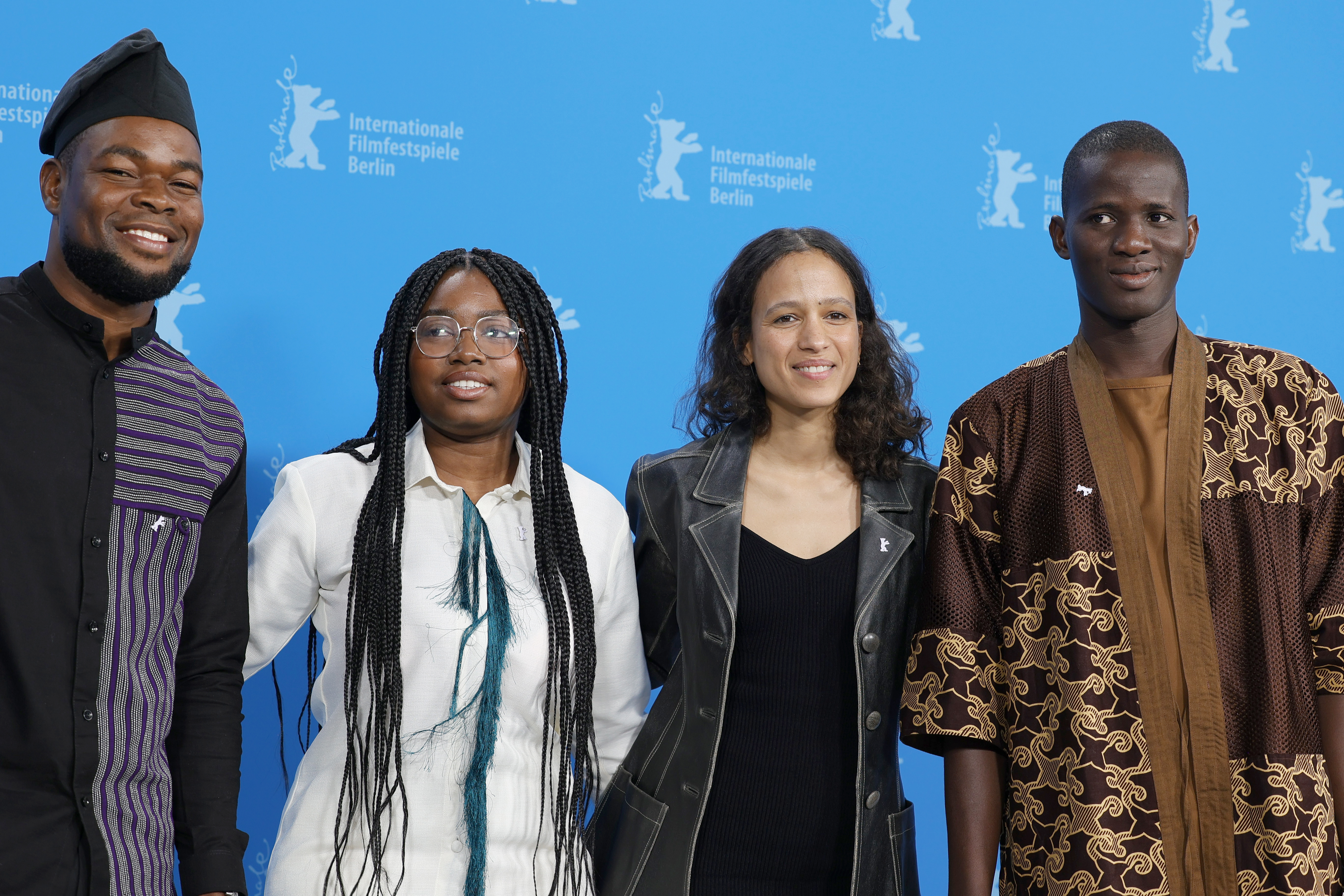
Film crew of Dahomey: Habib Ahandessi, Joséa Guedje, Mati Diop and Gildas Adannou at Berlinale 2024

The documentary was produced by Les Films du Bal in co-production with Fanta Sy and distributed by Les Films du Losange. The director was Mati Diop, who also wrote the script, and the director of photography was Joséphine Drouin-Viallard. It was edited by Gabriel Gonzalez. The thoughts of the voiced statue were written by Makenzy Orcel. The music was composed by Wally Badarou and Dean Blunt. Corneille Houssou, Nicolas Becker and Cyril Holtz were the sound designers. The film incorporates footage from the surveillance cameras at the Musée du Quai Branly – Jacques Chirac and the Palais de la Marina in Cotonou.

== Release ==
Dahomey premiered on 18 February 2024, as part of the 74th Berlin International Film Festival, where it was shown as part of the main competition.

In January 2024, Paris-based Les Films du Losange acquired the sales rights. That February, Mubi acquired the distribution rights to the film for North America, Latin America, United Kingdom, Ireland, Germany, Austria, Switzerland, Italy, Turkey and India from Les Films du Losange and plans to release the film in late 2024. It opened the 46th Cinéma du Réel Festival that took place from 22 to 31 March 2024 in Paris.

The film was presented in Special Presentations section of the 71st Sydney Film Festival on 8 June 2024 and played at the Toronto International Film Festival on 5 September 2024. It was screened in 'Documentaries' at the 2024 Atlantic International Film Festival on 14 September 2024.

Dahomey was also selected to open Zabaltegi-Tabakalera section of 72nd San Sebastián International Film Festival, where it was screened on 20 September 2024. It was screened in 'Showcase' at the 2024 Vancouver International Film Festival on 29 September 2024.

It released in French theatres on 11 September 2024, by Les Films du Losange.

The film was also invited at the 29th Busan International Film Festival in 'Documentary Showcase' section and was screened in October 2024. It was also presented in Special Presentations section of the 2024 BFI London Film Festival on 12 October 2024. It also made it to Main Slate of 2024 New York Film Festival and was screened at the Lincoln Center in October 2024. It had its Quebec Premiere in the Essentials at the Festival du nouveau cinéma on October 16, 2024. On 31 October 2024, the film was showcased at the 37th Tokyo International Film Festival in 'World Focus' section.

== Reception ==
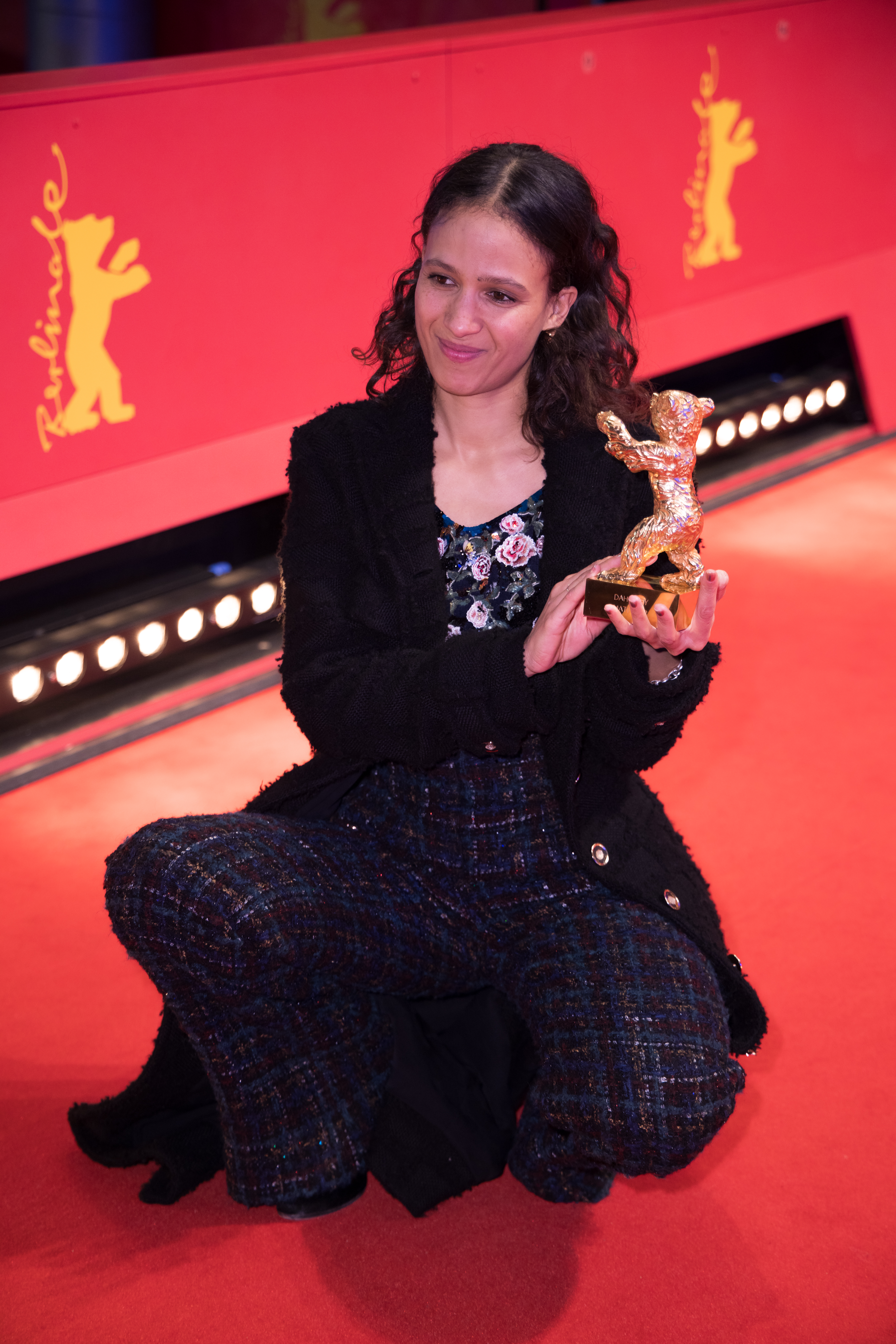
Mati Diop with the Golden Bear award for the best film of the Berlinale 2024

=== Critical response ===
On the review aggregator Rotten Tomatoes website, the film has an approval rating of 99% based on 81 reviews, with an average rating of 8.2/10. The website's critics consensus reads: "With a rigorous yet fantastical approach, Mati Diop's Dahomey provocatively uncovers the restitution and repatriation of a stolen legacy, and serves as a powerful statement for decolonization." On Metacritic, it has a weighted average score of 85 out of 100 based on 23 reviews, indicating "universal acclaim".

On the AlloCiné, which lists 27 press reviews, the film obtained an average rating of 4.1/5.

David Rooney reviewing the film for The Hollywood Reporter described it as "Richly layered and resonant", and opined: "This directorial flourish liberates the looted treasures from being mere objects, with smart use of subjective camera by DP Joséphine Drouin-Viallard helping to make them come alive as characters."

E. Nina Rothe, writing for the International Cinephile Society, noted that the film "is important, with its message crucial to restitution providing the beginning of righting the wrongs of colonialism".

Wendy Ide wrote in ScreenDaily while reviewing the film at Berlinale, "In this agile, cerebral film, using a combination of deft fly-on-the-wall footage, a centrepiece debate among students at the University of Abomey-Calavi and an unexpected element of fantasy, the film feels like an important contribution to an ongoing conversation about the legacy of colonialism in Africa, and to the thorny topic of restitution and repatriation of cultural heritage to the country of its origin."

Jessica Kiang, writing in Variety in her review of Berlinale, said: "French-Senegalese director Mati Diop fashions her superb, short but potent hybrid doc Dahomey as a slim lever that cracks open the sealed crate of colonial history, sending a hundred of its associated erasures and injustices tumbling into the light." Kiang concluded: "Dahomey is a striking, stirring example of the poetry that can result when the dead and the dispossessed speak to and through the living."

Stephanie Bunbury, in her review at Berlinale for Deadline said: "Open-ended, fecund with imagination and ideas, never hectoring or lecturing, not so much posing questions as asking what questions might be posed: Mati Diop's film is a marvelous provocation."

Adam Solomons of IndieWire, reviewing at Berlinale, graded the film B and criticised the runtime of the film, he opined: "Dahomey might have worked better at a runtime of [closer to 30 minutes]: the student debate, though well staged, becomes a bit repetitive, and some of the shots of boxes being loaded and unloaded go at a snail's pace." Concluding Solomons praised the director Mati Diop and wrote: "Dahomey is a bold and memorable history lesson. But with Diop's expressive talents as they are, it's fair to hope that she returns to the world of fiction next time."

Writing for RogerEbert.com, Robert Daniels praised "inventive" Diop's "distinct approach to the seemingly straightforward topic", highlighting the film's "dreamlike score", and saying that Dahomey "fills and nourishes the viewer with urgent desires, providing space for the light that constitutes the souls of Black folk to shine brighter through repair. Diop is back, and she is just as searing and imperative as ever."

Reviewing in Le Polyester, Nicolas Bardot gave the film a 5/6 rating, and stated: "Mati Diop ambitiously mixes the political and the poetic. Her stories always project further than the facts apparent before our eyes." Concluding, Bardot opined: "In Dahomey, it is not only the present that the past finds, but also the future."

Nicholas Bell in Ion Cinema rated the film with three and half stars and opened his review stating, "The spirit of Ozymandias, the classic poem from Percy Bysshe Shelley, might rouse itself in one's mind during Mati Diop's short but passionate documentary Dahomey – "Look on my Works, ye Mighty, and despair!"" Thus Bell opined, "[the film] is a depiction of a journey with so much more going on beneath the surface than an exchange of cultural artifacts." Concluding his review, Bell said: "Much like her 2019 narrative debut, Atlantics, Diop proves to be exceptionally adept at coalescing textures and strands in remarkably dense ways, and Dahomey is an excellent point of entry in an ongoing conversation."

Peter Bradshaw reviewing for The Guardian rated the film with four stars out of five and wrote, "It is an invigorating and enlivening film, with obvious implications for the Elgin/Parthenon marbles in the British Museum."

Shubhra Gupta, reviewing for The Indian Express, wrote that the film using a unique documentary approach laced with fantasy "powerfully challenges post-colonial notions of reparations and repair", and that the film is "A question that deserves our attention, and the answers that emerge from it..."

In June 2025, IndieWire ranked the film at number 48 on its list of "The 100 Best Movies of the 2020s (So Far)."

=== Box office ===
As of 1 December 2024, the film has collected $522,753 worldwide.

=== Accolades ===
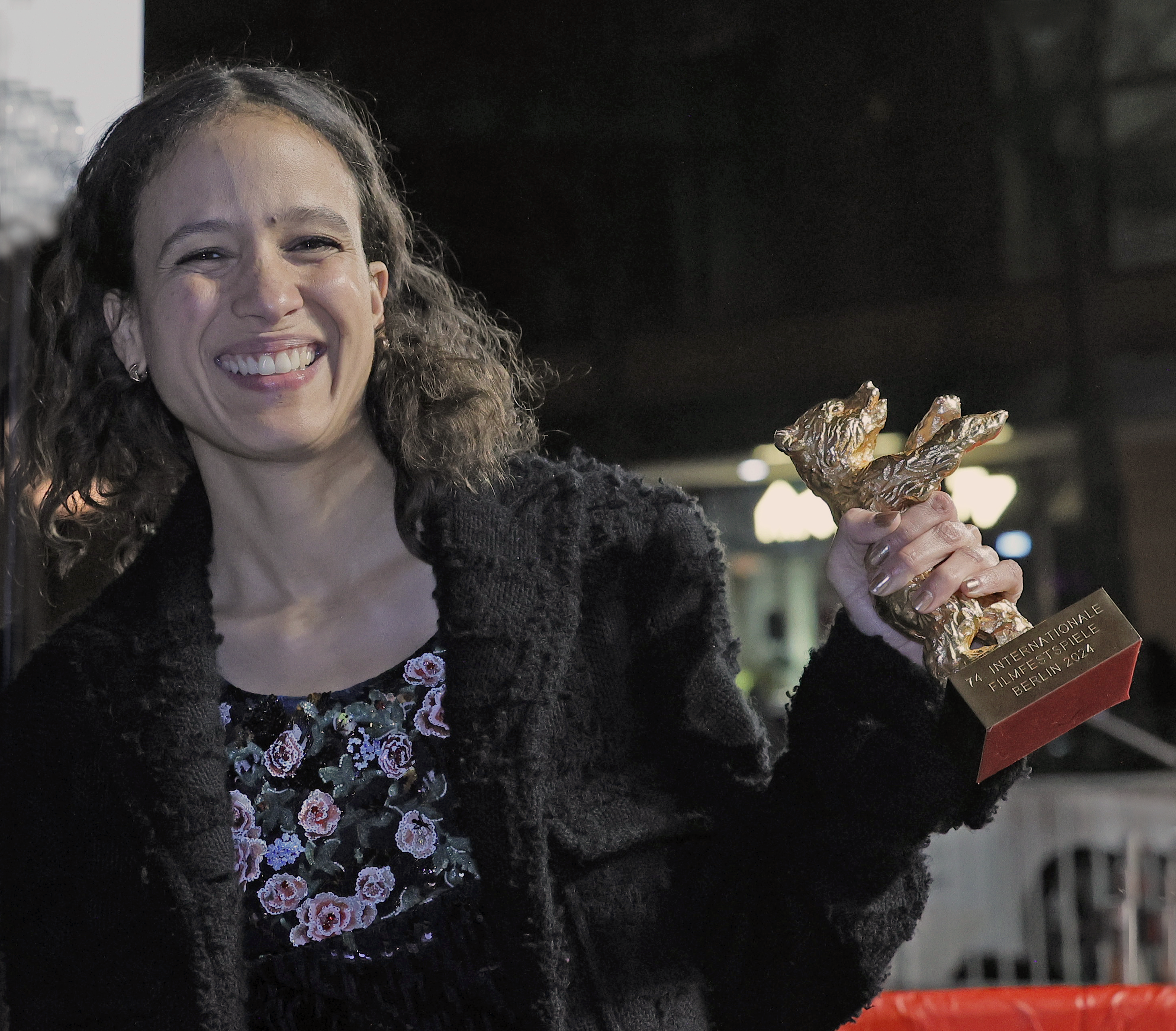
Mati Diop with the Golden Bear at Berlinale 2024

Dahomey was selected to compete at the 74th Berlin International Film Festival, where it was awarded the Golden Bear award for the best film. It is the second African film to win the top prize at the festival, following Mark Dornford-May's South African drama film U-Carmen eKhayelitsha in 2015. Dahomey was the second documentary in a row to take the Golden Bear, after Nicolas Philibert's On the Adamant in 2023. During her acceptance speech, Diop called for people "to tear down the wall of silence together" and "to rebuild through restitution", which entails "bringing justice".

In August 2024, the film was selected for nomination to 37th European Film Awards held at Kultur- und Kongresszentrum Luzern in Lucerne on 7 December 2024.

The film was ranked 15th among the top 25 European works of 2024 by the journalists at Cineuropa.

Award	Date	Category	Recipient	Result	Ref.
Berlin International Film Festival	25 February 2024	Golden Bear	Mati Diop	Won	
Berlin International Film Festival	25 February 2024	Berlinale Documentary Film Award	Mati Diop	Nominated	
San Sebastián International Film Festival	28 September 2024	Zabaltegi-Tabakalera Award	Dahomey	Nominated	
Chicago International Film Festival	27 October 2024	Gold Hugo – Documentary Competition	Dahomey	Nominated	
Tokyo International Film Festival	6 November 2024	TIFF Ethical Film Award	Dahomey	Won	
Critics' Choice Documentary Awards	10 November 2024	Best Historical Documentary	Dahomey	Nominated	
Critics' Choice Documentary Awards	10 November 2024	Best Narration	Makenzy Orcel, Lucrece Houegbelo, Parfait Viayinon, Didier Sedoha Nassegande & Sabine Badjogoumin	Nominated	
Festival international du cinéma francophone en Acadie	24 November 2024	Best Documentary	Dahomey	Won	
Gotham Awards	2 December 2024	Best Documentary Feature	Mati Diop, Judith Lou Lévy, Eve Robin	Nominated	
Louis Delluc Prize	4 December 2024	Best Film	Dahomey	Nominated	
International Documentary Association Awards	5 December 2024	Best Feature Documentary	Mati Diop, Judith Lou Lévy, Eve Robin	Nominated	
National Board of Review Awards	5 December 2024	Top 5 Documentaries	Dahomey	Top 5	
European Film Awards	7 December 2024	European Film	Dahomey	Shortlisted	
European Film Awards	7 December 2024	European Documentary	Dahomey	Nominated	
European Film Awards	7 December 2024	Lux Award	Dahomey	Nominated	
Washington D.C. Area Film Critics Association	December 8, 2024	Best Documentary	Dahomey	Nominated	
Washington D.C. Area Film Critics Association	December 8, 2024	Best Foreign Language Film	Dahomey	Nominated	
Los Angeles Film Critics Association	8 December 2024	Best Documentary Film	Dahomey	Runner-up	
Chicago Film Critics Association	12 December 2024	Best Documentary Film	Dahomey	Nominated	
Toronto Film Critics Association	15 December 2024	Best Documentary Film	Dahomey	Won	
St. Louis Film Critics Association	15 December 2024	Best International Feature Film	Dahomey	Nominated	
Seattle Film Critics Society	16 December 2024	Best Documentary Film	Dahomey	Nominated	
Dallas–Fort Worth Film Critics Association	9 December 2024	Best Documentary Film	Dahomey	5th Place	
National Society of Film Critics	4 January 2025	Best Nonfiction Film	Dahomey	Runner-up	
Austin Film Critics Association	6 January 2025	Best Documentary Film	Dahomey	Nominated	
Cinema Eye Honors	9 January 2025	Outstanding Non-Fiction Feature	Mati Diop, Eve Robin, Judith Lou Levy, Gabriel Gonzalez, Joséphine Drouin Viallard and Nicolas Becker	Nominated	
Cinema Eye Honors	9 January 2025	Outstanding Direction	Mati Diop	Won	
Cinema Eye Honors	9 January 2025	Outstanding Cinematography	Joséphine Drouin Viallard	Nominated	
Cinema Eye Honors	9 January 2025	Outstanding Original Score	Wally Badarou and Dean Blunt	Nominated	
Cinema Eye Honors	9 January 2025	Outstanding Sound Design	Nicolas Becker	Nominated	
Lumière Awards	20 January 2025	Best Documentary	Mati Diop	Won	
Satellite Awards	26 January 2025	Best Motion Picture – Documentary	Dahomey	Nominated	
Alliance of Women Film Journalists	7 January 2025	Best International Film	Dahomey	Nominated	
Alliance of Women Film Journalists	7 January 2025	Best Documentary	Dahomey	Won	
Golden Reel Awards	23 February 2025	Outstanding Achievement in Sound Editing – Feature Documentary	Nicolas Becker, Sylvain Malbrant, Maxime Saleix, Gilles Marsalet	Nominated	
César Awards	28 February 2025	Best Documentary Film	Dahomey	Nominated	

== See also ==
- List of submissions to the 97th Academy Awards for Best International Feature Film
- List of Senegalese submissions for the Academy Award for Best International Feature Film
- Submissions for the Academy Award for Best Documentary Feature
