= Franz-Hessel-Preis =

Franz-Hessel-Preis or Franz Hessel Prize for Contemporary Literature is a literary prize of France and Germany for French and German authors. The prize was created as a tribute to the writer and translator Franz Hessel.

This Franco-German prize is conceived and organized by the Villa Gillet in Lyon and the Genshagen Foundation in the Land of Brandenburg (next to Berlin). The award is supported by the German Federal Government for Culture and Media and the French Ministry of Culture and Communication.

== History ==
The award was presented for the first time on 10 December 2010 in Freiburg im Breisgau, Germany. It was presented by German Culture Minister Bernd Neumann and French Culture Minister Frederic Mitterrand as sponsors of the Franco-German Council of Ministers. Each year, two authors, one German, the other French, are awarded. The award-winning author must have recently published a work, ideally in the year the prize is given. The winners are selected by an independent French-German jury.

This literary prize is endowed with €10,000 per author. A translation in German for the French author and in French for the German author is planned in collaboration with the publishing houses concerned.

== Winners ==
- 2010: Kathrin Röggla for Die Alarmbereiten (S. Fischer) and Maylis de Kerangal for Birth of a Bridge [Naissance d'un pont] (Verticales).
- 2011: Thomas Melle for Sickster (Rowohlt-Berlin) and Céline Minard for So long, Luise (Denoël).
- 2012: Andreas Maier for Das Haus (Suhrkamp Verlag) and Éric Vuillard for La bataille d'Occident (Actes Sud).
- 2013: Jonas Lüscher for Frühling der Barbaren (C.H.Beck) and Frédéric Ciriez for Mélo (Verticales).
- 2014: Esther Kinsky for Am Fluß (Matthes & Seitz Berlin) and Christine Montalbetti for Nothing but the Waves and Wind [Plus rien que les vagues et le vent] (P.O.L).
- 2016: Ulrich Peltzer for Das bessere Leben (S. Fischer Verlag) and Michael Ferrier for Mémoires d'outre-mer (Gallimard).
- 2017: Christine Wunnicke for Der Fuchs und Dr. Shimamura (Berenberg Verlag) and Philippe Forest for Crue (Gallimard)
- 2018: Fatma Aydemir for Ellbogen (Hanser Verlag) and Michel Jullien for Denise au Ventoux (Verdier)
- 2019: Susanne Röckel for Der Vogelgott (Jung und Jung Verlag, 2018) and Anne-Marie Garat für Le Grand Nord-Ouest (Éditions Actes Sud, 2018)
- 2020: Lola Randl for Der Große Garten (Matthes & Seitz Berlin) and Emmanuelle Pireyre for Chimère (Éditions de l'Olivier)
- 2021: Dorothee Elmiger for Aus der Zuckerfabrik (Hanser) and Camille de Toledo for Thésée, sa vie nouvelle (Verdier)
- 2022: Maryline Desbiolles for Charbons ardents (Éd. Seuil) and Fridolin Schley for Die Verteidigung (Hanser Berlin)
