= Fatma Aydemir =

German author and journalist

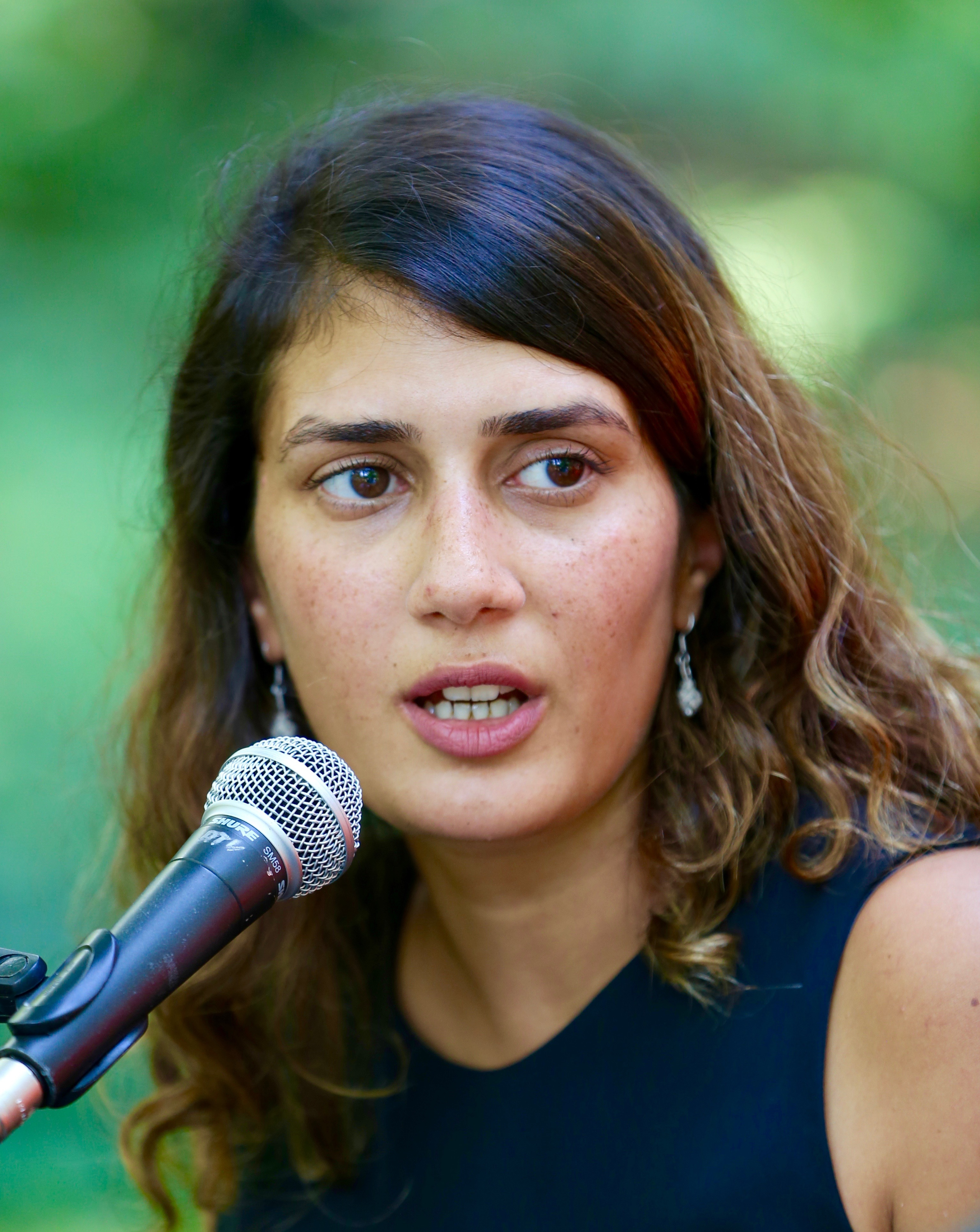
- Aydemir in 2017
- Born: 1986 (age 39–40); Karlsruhe, West Germany
- Occupations: Writer; journalist
- Writing career
- Language: German
- Notable awards: Franz-Hessel-Preis; 2018 Ellbogen

Fatma Aydemir (born 1986) is a German author and journalist based in Berlin. She is best known for her novel Ellbogen (Elbow), which won both the 2018 Franz Hessel Prize and the Klaus Michael Kühne prize for best debut novel of 2017.

== Biography ==
Aydemir was born in Karlsruhe, West Germany. She is the granddaughter of Turkish-Kurdish immigrants.

She is an editor and columnist for Die Tageszeitung. Before it ceased publication, she wrote for the German music magazine Spex. She also founded a bilingual German/Turkish portal in response to incursions against press freedom in Turkey.

== Works ==
- Aydemir, Fatma (2017). Ellbogen: Roman (in German). München: Hanser. ISBN 978-3-446-25441-1. OCLC 964395472.
- Aydemir, Fatma (2022). Dschinns: Roman (in German). München: Hanser. ISBN 978-3-446-26914-9. OCLC 1282190927.
