= Toucan Prize =

The Toucan Prize (German: Tukan-Preis) is a literary prize given by the city of Munich to the best new publication by a Munich author. It has been awarded since 1965 and is endowed with 6,000 Euros.

== Recipients ==
- 1965 Paul Mommertz, Georg Schwarz, Roland Ziersch, Alfons Freiherr von Czibulka, Horst Lange, Otto Freiherr von Taube
- 1966 Rudolf Schmitt-Sulzthal, Eugen Skasa-Weiß, Isabella Nadolny, Gunter Groll, Carola von Crailsheim, Curt Hohoff
- 1967 Karl Ude, Oliver Hassencamp, Nina Keller
- 1969 Anton Sailer, Wilhelm Lukas Kristl, Christa Reinig, Günter Spang, Heinrich Fischer, Tankred Dorst
- 1971 Herbert Asmodi, Angelika Mechtel, Heinz Piontek, Martin Gregor-Dellin, Rolf Flügel
- 1973 Marianne Langewiesche, Wolfgang Petzet, Kuno Raeber
- 1975 Wolfgang Bächler, Charlotte Birnbaum, Heinz Coubier, Armin Eichholz, Herbert Günther, Helmut Walbert
- 1977 Ernst Günther Bleisch, Karl Hoche, Ursula Knöller, Irina Korschunow, Herbert Rosendorfer, Herbert Schlüter
- 1979 Carl Amery, Janosch, Kurt Seeberger
- 1981 Hermann Stahl, Carl Borro Schwerla, Franz Freisleder, Dagmar Nick, Jörg Krichbaum, Barbara Bronnen
- 1983 Michael Krüger, Rudolf Riedler, Barbara König, Carla Maria Heim, Jörg Graser, Grete Weil
- 1985 Walter Kolbenhoff, Hans F. Nöhbauer
- 1987 Uwe Dick, Eberhard Horst, Michael Wachsmann
- 1989 Herbert Achternbusch, Barbara Maria Kloos, Fred Hepp
- 1991 Günter Herburger
- 1992 Uwe Dick
- 1993 Helmut Krausser
- 1994 Maxim Biller
- 1995 Christine Scherrmann, Hans Pleschinski
- 1996 Ernst Augustin
- 1997 Klaus Böldl
- 1998 Günter Ohnemus, Der Tiger auf deiner Schulter
- 1999 Susanne Röckel, Chinesisches Alphabet – Ein Jahr in Shanghai
- 2000 Hassouna Mosbahi, Rückkehr nach Tarschisch with the translator Regina Karachouli
- 2001 Uwe Timm, Rot
- 2002 Hans Pleschinski, Bildnis eines Unsichtbaren
- 2003 Simon Werle, Der Schnee der Jahre
- 2004 Thomas Meinecke, Musik
- 2005 Thomas Palzer, Ruin
- 2006 Friedrich Ani, Idylle der Hyänen
- 2007 Fridolin Schley, Wildes schönes Tier
- 2008 Christine Wunnicke, Serenity
- 2009 Robert Hültner, Inspektor Kajetan kehrt zurück
- 2010 Christopher Hipkiss, Leinwand
- 2011 Steven Uhly, Adams Fuge
- 2012 Marc Deckert, Die Kometenjäger
- 2013 Dagmar Leupold, Unter der Hand
- 2014 Nina Jäckle, Der lange Atem
- 2015 Lilian Loke, Gold in den Straßen
- 2016 Björn Bicker, Was glaubt ihr denn. Urban Prayers
- 2017 Jonas Lüscher, Kraft
- 2018 Susanne Röckel, Der Vogelgott
- 2019 Herbert Kapfer, 1919. Fiktion
- 2020 Markus Ostermair, Der Sandler
- 2021 Fridolin Schley, Die Verteidigung

== See also ==
- German literature
- List of literary awards
- List of poetry awards
- List of years in literature
- List of years in poetry
