= Fridolin Schley =

German writer (born 1976)

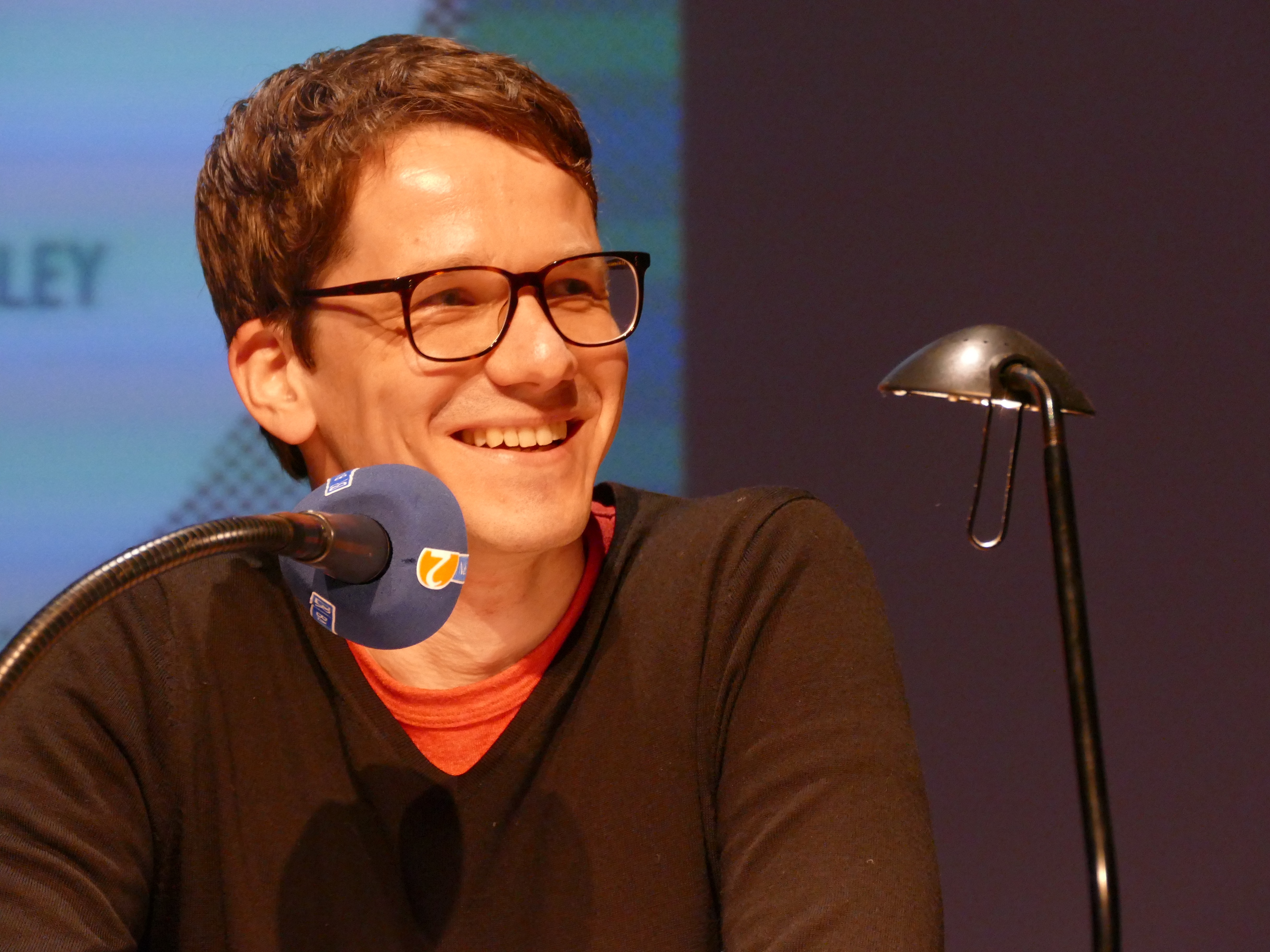
- Born: 29 October 1976 (age 49); Munich, West Germany
- Education: PhD
- Occupation: Writer
- Partner: Juliane "Rübe" Brückner
- Writing career
- Language: German
- Notable awards: Bayerischer Kunstförderpreis; Toucan Prize; Franz-Hessel-Preis
- Website: fridolinschley.de

Fridolin Schley (born 29 October 1976) is a German writer. In 2007 he won the Toucan Prize for his novel Wildes schönes Tier, and in 2021 again for Die Verteidigung.

== Life ==
Fridolin Schley was born in Munich on 29 October 1976. He went to school in Gauting and then studied German studies, philosophy and political science in Munich and Berlin, followed by a course of studies at the University of Television and Film Munich. He received his PhD for his works on W. G. Sebald. In 2007 he was invited to the Festival of German-Language Literature to read from his novella Unannehmlichkeiten durch Liebe. He is a member of the German section of PEN International and works as a freelancer for Die Zeit. He lives in Munich.

== Reception ==
The FAZ attests his debut novel Verloren, mein Vater "literary finesse" and "bravery"; he impressed with his dealing with social topics.

=== Awards ===
- 2001: Hermann-Lenz-Preis studentship for Verloren, mein Vater
- 2001: Bayerischer Kunstförderpreis for Verloren, mein Vater
- 2007: Toucan Prize for Wildes Schönes Tier
- 2021: Toucan Prize for Die Verteidigung
- 2022: Franz-Hessel-Preis for Die Verteidigung

== Bibliography ==
=== Fiction ===
- 2001: Verloren, mein Vater. C. H. Beck Verlag. ISBN 3-406-47129-3.
- 2003: Schwimmbadsommer. C. H. Beck Verlag. ISBN 3-406-50260-1.
- 2007: Wildes Schönes Tier. Berlin Verlag. ISBN 978-3-8270-0747-6.
- 2016: Die Ungesichter. Allitera Verlag. ISBN 978-3-86906-837-4.
- 2021: Die Verteidigung. Carl Hanser Verlag. ISBN 978-3-446-26592-9.

=== Non-fiction ===
- 2012: Kataloge der Wahrheit. Zur Inszenierung von Autorschaft bei W. G. Sebald. Wallstein Verlag. ISBN 3-8353-0960-9.
- 2014: Die Achte Welt: Fünfzig Jahre Super 8. Edition Braus. ISBN 978-3-86228-098-8.
