= Helmut Krausser =

German author (born 1964)

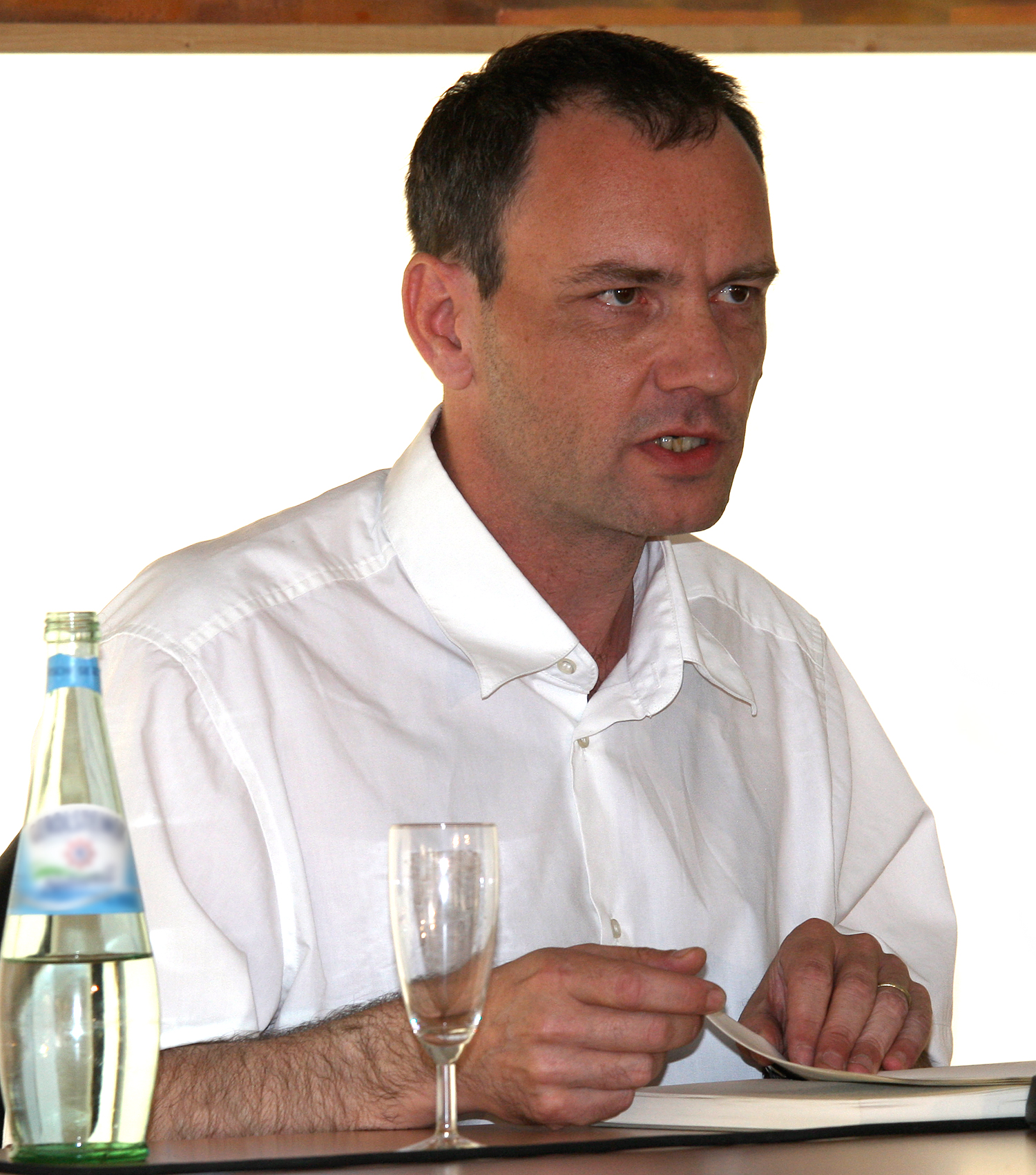
Helmut Krausser, German writer, poet and stage author, at a reading in Cologne

Helmut Krausser (11 July 1964) is a German author, poet, playwright, composer and professional chess player who was born in Esslingen.

== Biography ==
Krausser lives in Munich and Berlin. He married Beatrice Renauer in 1991.

In 1993 he received the Toucan Prize.

After a few smaller novels his literary breakthrough arrived with Melodien oder Nachträge zum quecksilbernen Zeitalter. Since then, many of his books have been translated into multiple languages and plays of his have been performed all over the world.

Krausser also composes classical music.

== Works ==
=== Novels, short stories and poems ===
- Könige über dem Ozean. Munich: Knaus, 1989
- Spielgeld. Munich: Kirchheim, 1990
- Fette Welt. Munich: List, 1992
- Tagebücher Mai 1992 – April 2004. Munich: Belleville, 1992–2004, each year one month
- Melodien oder Nachträge zum quecksilbernen Zeitalter. Munich: List, 1993
- Die Zerstörung der europäischen Städte. Munich: List, 1994
- Thanatos. Munich: Luchterhand, 1996
- Der große Bagarozy. Reinbek near Hamburg: Rowohlt, 1997
  - English: The Great Bagarozy Dedalus, 1998, transl. by Mike Mitchell
- Schweine und Elefanten. Reinbek near Hamburg: Rowohlt, 1999
- Das Kaninchen, das den Jäger erschoss – und andere bizarre Todesfälle. Reinbek near Hamburg: Rowohlt, 1999
- Gedichte 79–99. Munich: Belleville, 1999
- Schmerznovelle. Reinbek near Hamburg: Rowohlt, 2001
- Wenn Gwendolin nachts schlafen ging. Munich: Kunstmann, 2002
- UC (Ultrachronos). Reinbek near Hamburg: Rowohlt, 2003
- Strom, Gedichte 99-03. Reinbek near Hamburg: Rowohlt, 2003
- Die wilden Hunde von Pompeii. Reinbek near Hamburg: Rowohlt, September 2004
- Eros. DuMont 2006
- Plasma. Gedichte. DuMont 2007
- Die kleinen Gärten des Maestro Puccini. DuMont 2008
- Einsamkeit und Sex und Mitleid. Dumont, August 2009
- Zwei ungleiche Rivalen – Puccini und Franchetti. Bertelsmann 2010
- Die letzten schönen Tage. Dumont, Februar 2011

=== Plays ===
- Stücke 93-03. Frankfurt am Main: Fischer, 2003, includes:
  - Lederfresse
    - English: Leatherface Fischer, 1996, transl. by Tony Meech
  - Haltestelle Geister
  - Denotation Babel

=== Other ===
Krausser wrote several contributions and articles in numerous newspapers and magazines. Furthermore, records and radio plays of him were released. Two movies have been made from his novels to date (2004).
