= Christine Montalbetti =

French writer

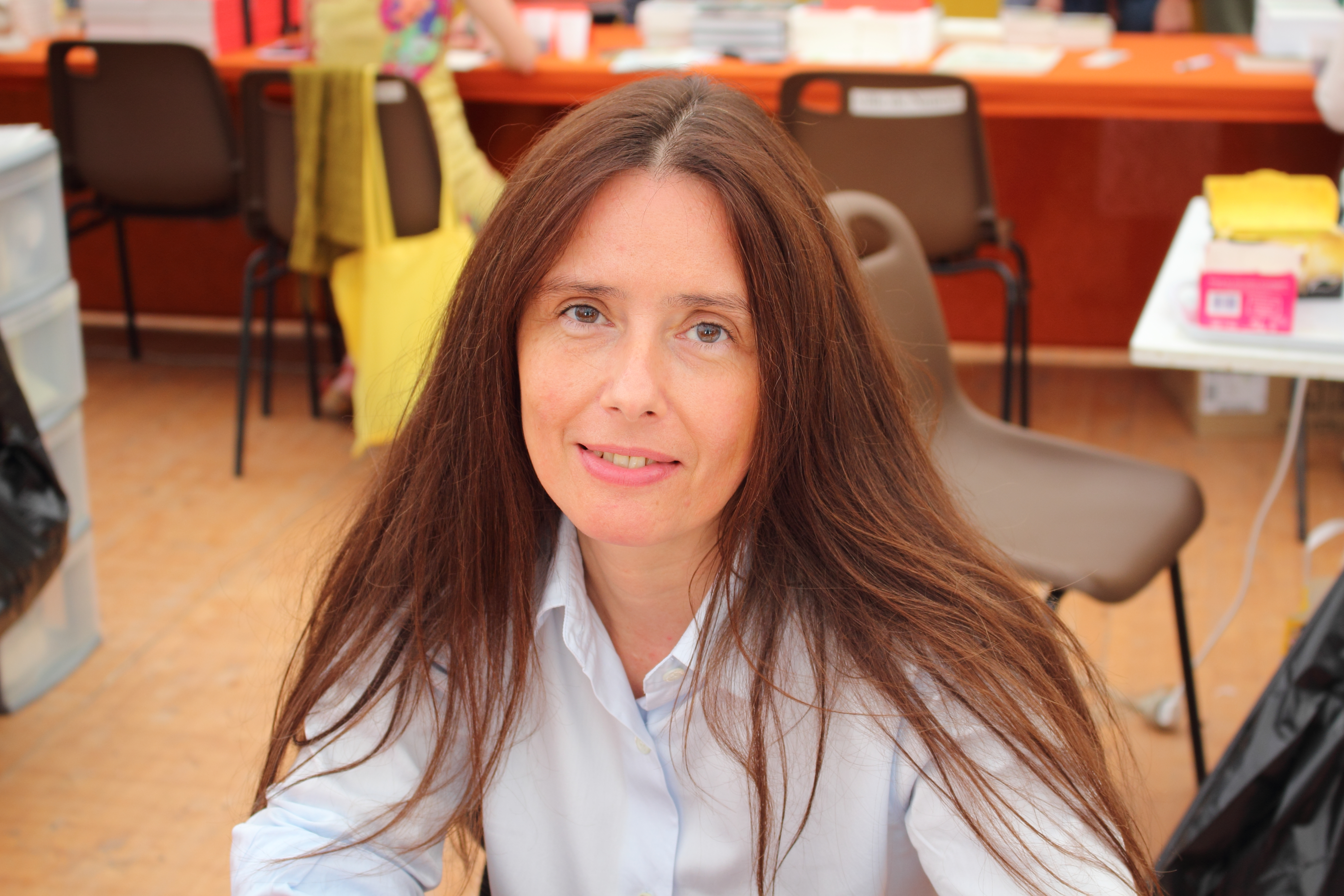
- Livre sur la Place 2016
- Born: 13 July 1965 (age 61)
- Occupation: Writer
- Writing career
- Notable awards: Franz-Hessel-Preis

Christine Montalbetti (born 13 July 1965) is a French novelist, playwright and professor of literature at the University of Paris. In her writing, Montalbetti practices what Warren Motte calls "intrusive narration," or a narrative style that engages the reader directly in dialogue. Thus in one of her short stories, Montalbetti remarks to the reader, "you are the one person who many imagine flawlessly the particular trouble that the unlucky hero of this story experiences."

Christine Montalbetti has written several works of fiction, many of which have been translated into English and published with Dalkey Archive Press. Plus rien que les vagues et le vent (Nothing But the Waves and Wind) was awarded the 2014 Franz-Hessel-Preis for the best work of contemporary fiction.

== Works ==
=== Novels ===
- Sa fable achevée, Simon sort dans la bruine (2001)
- L'Origine de l'homme (2002). The Origin of Man, trans. Betsy Wing (Dalkey Archive Press, 2012)
- Western (2005). Western, trans. Betsy Wing (Dalkey Archive Press, 2009)
- Journée américaine (2009). American Journal, trans. Jane Kuntz (Dalkey Archive Press, 2018)
- L'Évaporation de l'oncle (2011)
- Love Hotel (2013)
- Plus rien que les vagues et le vent (2014). Nothing But the Waves and Wind, trans. Jane Kuntz (Dalkey Archive Press, 2017)
- La vie est faite de ces toutes petites choses (2016)
- Trouville Casino (2018)
- Mon ancêtre Poisson (2019)
- Ce que c’est qu’une existence (2021)

=== Récits and novellas ===
- Expérience de la campagne (2005)
- Nouvelles sur le sentiment amoureux (2007)
- Petits déjeuners avec quelques écrivains célèbres (2008)

=== Theatre ===
- Le Cas Jekyll (2010)
- Le Bruiteur (2017)
- La Conférence des objets (2020)
