= Arthur Kutscher =

German academic (1878–1960)

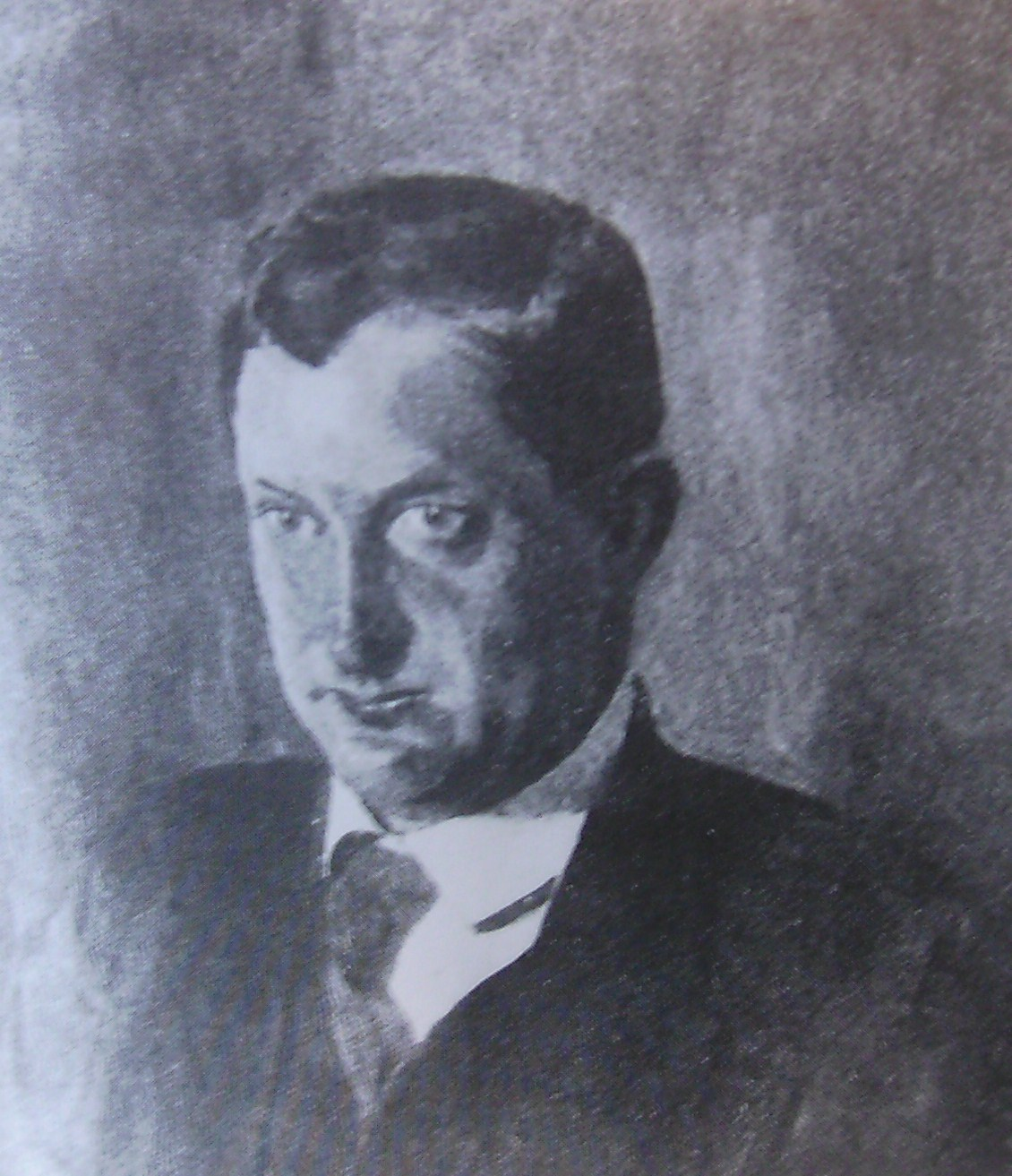
Prof. Dr. phil. Artur Kutscher

Artur Heinrich Theodor Christoph Kutscher (sometimes wrongly written Arthur; 17 July 1878 in Hannover – 29 August 1960 in Munich) was a German historian of literature and researcher in drama.

== Life ==
Artur Kutscher settled in Munich after studying philosophy, literature, art history and Germanistik at the Ludwig-Maximilians-Universität München, Kiel University, and the Humboldt University of Berlin (doctorate in 1904). In 1907, he completed his habilitation in literary studies at the Humboldt University of Berlin, became a private lecturer in the same year and an außerordentlicher or extraordinary professor (not holding a chair) at the Ludwig-Maximilians-Universität München in 1915.

Together with Max Herrmann, he can be seen as a founding father of theatre studies in Germany. He was a professor at the Ludwig-Maximilians-Universität München, where he taught a famous seminar in theatre history. Kutscher was a friend of the iconoclastic dramatist and cabaret-star Frank Wedekind. His work influenced many playwrights, poets, and directors. His students included Bertolt Brecht (studied in 1917), Erwin Piscator (studied in 1913), Peter Hacks, Hanns Johst, Klabund, and Erich Mühsam. Brecht's first full-length play, Baal (written 1918), was written in response to an argument in one of Kutscher's drama seminars. While Kutscher was responsible for inspiring an admiration for Wedekind in the young Brecht, he was "bitterly critical" of Brecht's own early dramatic writings.

During the First World War, he served as an officer (1st Lieutenant in the Landwehr) on the Western Front and led the 8th company of the Reserve Infantry Regiment No. 92. He earned the Iron Cross, but also the Order of Military Merit, 4th Class with Swords.

In 1933, he joined the National Socialist Teachers League. In 1938, he also became a member of the NSV and the NS-Reichskriegerbund. After becoming a professor in 1940, he applied for admission to the NSDAP on 12 December 1941 and was accepted on 1 January 1942 (membership number 8,802,675).

He retired in 1951. In 1958, two years before his death, he was awarded the Great Cross of Merit (Großes Verdienstkreuz) of the Order of Merit of the Federal Republic of Germany.

== Works (excerpt) ==
- Friedrich Hebbel als Kritiker des Dramas. Seine Kritik und ihre Bedeutung, Berlin 1907
- Die Kunst und unser Leben, 1909
- Kriegstagebuch, 2 volumes, 1915
- Das richtige Soldatenlied. Verse und Singweisen im Felde gesammelt, G. Grothe, Berlin 1917
- Frank Wedekind, sein Leben und seine Werke. With plates, including portraits (Frank Wedekind, his Life and his Work), 1922 Record on Amazon.co.uk
- Grundriss der Theaterwissenschaft (Compendium of Dramatics), 2 Vols., 1932-1937
- Stilkunde des deutschen Dichtung (Stylistics of German Fiction), 1949
- Der Theaterprofessor (The Theatre Professor), 1960 (autobiography)

== Works cited ==
- Thomson, Peter. 1994. "Brecht's Lives". In The Cambridge Companion to Brecht. Ed. Peter Thomson and Glendyr Sacks. Cambridge Companions to Literature Ser. Cambridge: Cambridge University Press. 22-39. ISBN 0-521-41446-6.
- Willett, John. 1967. The Theatre of Bertolt Brecht: A Study from Eight Aspects. Third rev. ed. London: Methuen, 1977. ISBN 0-413-34360-X.
- ---. 1978. The Theatre of Erwin Piscator: Half a Century of Politics in the Theatre. London: Methuen. ISBN 0-413-37810-1.
- Willett, John and Ralph Manheim. 1970. Introduction. In Collected Plays: One by Bertolt Brecht. Ed. John Willett and Ralph Manheim. Bertolt Brecht: Plays, Poetry and Prose Ser. London: Methuen. ISBN 0-416-03280-X. p.vii-xvii.
