= Camille de Toledo =

French writer and a visual artist

Camille de Toledo (aka CHTO)
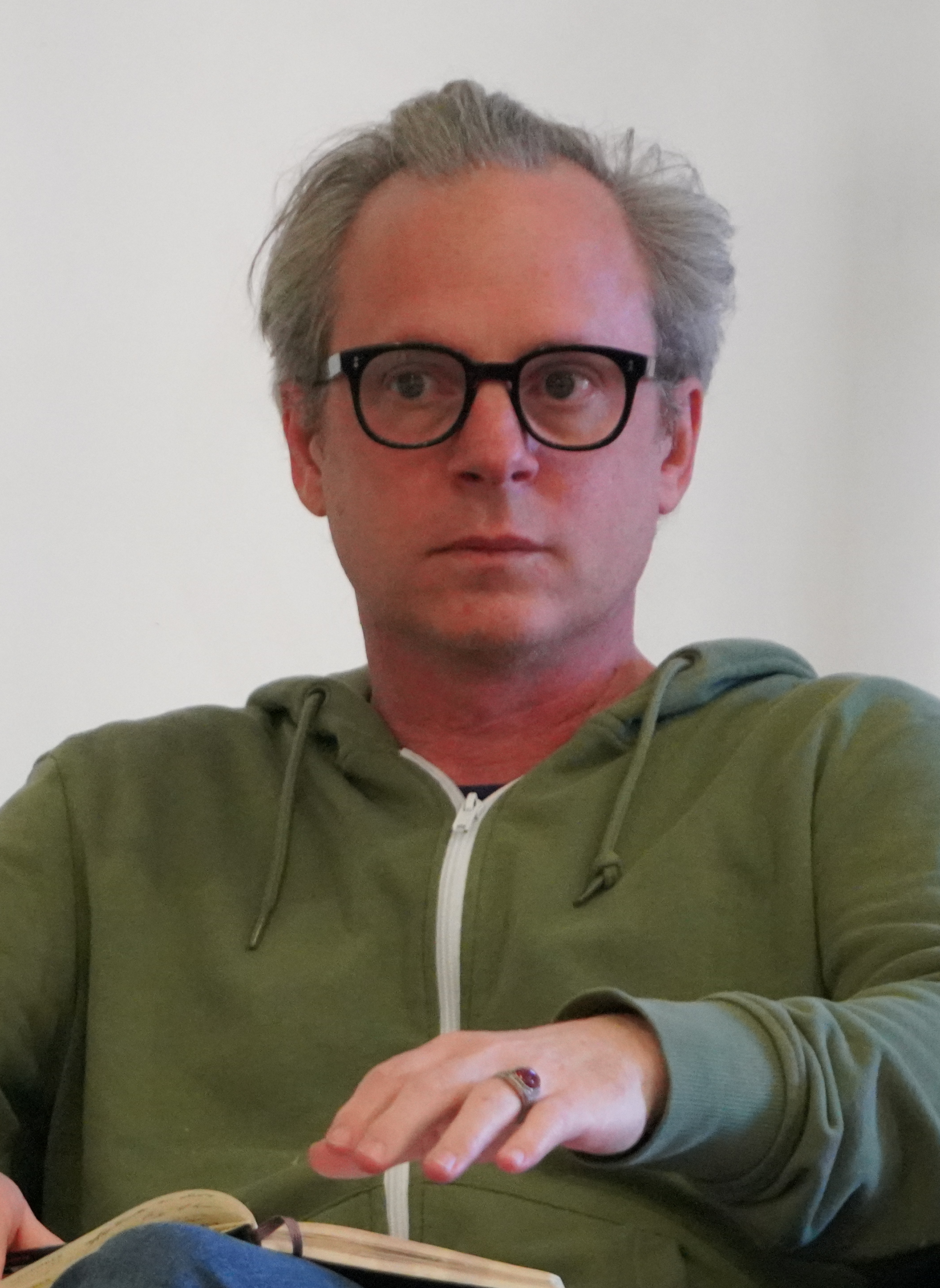
- 2023
- Born: 25 June 1975
- Education: Sciences Po – Paris West University Nanterre La Défense – London School of Economics – Tisch School of the Arts
- Known for: Writer, Visual artist

Camille de Toledo (born 25 June 1976, in Lyon, France) is a French writer and a visual artist.

== Biography ==
Camille de Toledo studied history and political science at Sciences Po as well as law and literature at the Paris West University Nanterre La Défense. He then continued his education at the London School of Economics before going on to study cinema and photography at the Tisch School of the Arts in New York.

Upon returning to France in 1996, he founded Don Quichotte, a Zapatist magazine for which he is a photographer and columnist. Camille de Toledo uses the heteronym Oscar Philipsen particularly to sign Rêves, his book published in October 2003 in the Éditions de La Martinière.

In 2004, he received a grant from the Villa Médicis.

In 2005, he began writing the tetralogy. Strates, described as "a fictional archeology". Two of the four installments have been published: L'Inversion de Hieronymus Bosch (ed. Verticales 2005), renamed Au temps des monstres catastrophes in 2011 for the Spanish translation (ed. Alpha Decay, trans Juan Asis), and Vies et mort d'un terroriste américain (ed. Verticales 2007).

Camille de Toledo is also the author of essays that combine different writing styles and genres: autobiographies, critiques, micro-fictions including Le Hêtre et le Bouleau (2009) and L'Adieu au 20e siècle (2002). In 2008, he published an essay response to the manifesto entitled Pour une littérature-monde en francais which was released in March 2007 at the Festival des étonnants voyageurs de Saint-Malo. Entitled Visiter le Flurkistan ou les illusions de la littérature-monde, it's a controversial charge in favor of literature that is philosophically engaged but free from all constraints particularly objectivist, naturalist, or realist and that are much more fundamentally an artificial archeology than a "real" and "authentic" travel experience.

His works are translated in Spain, Italy, Germany, and the United States. Camille de Toledo regularly collaborates with the philosophy, literature, and art magazine, Pylône.

In the spring of 2008, he founded the Sociéte européenne des auteurs with Maren Sell in order to promote translations.

In March 2011, his fragmented novel, Vies pøtentielles appeared in Seuil. It was, according to Domonique Rabaté, a watershed moment for biographies and literature.

At the beginning of 2012, his work, L'Inquiétude d'être au monde, appeared in the Verdier editions. In March 2013, Camille de Toledo wrote the booklet and directed the video for La Chute de Fukuyama, an opera at the Salle Pleyel, composed by Grégoire Hetzel on the September 11 attacks.

== Personal life ==
He is the son of journalist Christine Mital and movie producer Gérard Mital. On his father's side, he descends from a Judeo-Spanish family who originally come from Toledo, Spain, hence the last name "de Toledo". The birthplace of his family is Geneva, Switzerland.

He currently lives in Berlin and is the father of three.

== Publications ==
=== Essays ===
- Visiter le Flurkistan ou les illusions de la littérature-monde, PUF, 2007
- Le hêtre et le bouleau. Essai sur la tristesse européenne, Le Seuil, coll. " La Librairie du XXIe siècle ", 2009
- Les potentiels du temps, Art & Politique, avec Aliocha Imhoff et Kantuta Quiros, Manuella éditions, 2016
- Le fleuve qui voulait écrire : Les auditions du parlement de Loire, Manuella Editions-LLL Les liens qui libèrent, 2021

=== Novels ===
- L'Inversion de Hieronymus Bosch, Verticales, 2005 (En época de monstruos y catástrofes, Alpha Decay, 2012)
- Vies et mort d'un terroriste américain, Verticales, 2007
- Vies pøtentielles, micro-fictions, Seuil, " La Librairie du XXIe siècle ", 2011
- Oublier, trahir, puis disparaître, Le Seuil, coll. " La Librairie du XXIe siècle ", 2014
- Le Livre de la faim et de la soif, Gallimard, 2017
- Herzl, une histoire européenne, Ed. Denoël Graphics, 2018
- Thésée, sa vie nouvelle, Ed. Verdier, 2020
- Une histoire du vertige, Verdier, 2023

=== Collection of Songs ===
- Rêves, Oscar Philipsen, Éditions de La Martinière, 2003
- L'Inquiétude d'être au monde, Verdier, Chaoïd Collection, January 2012

=== Opera Booklet and theater ===
- La Chute de Fukuyama, on the music of Grégoire Hetzel, created in March 2013 in Paris.
- Sur une île, put on stage by Christophe Bergon in 2016 at "Theatre Garonne", Toulouse

== Filmographie ==
- 2001 : Tango de l'oubli, Whoopy Movies production, Official Selection, Festival de Cannes, New York Film Festival, Festival international du film de Mar del Plata
- 2003 : Gêne-s-ration, 52 minutes, Arte/Coup d'œil, documentary
- 2003 : Racontez-nous, Anna, 70 minutes, experimental video
- 2003 : The story of my brother, 26 minutes, video issue in the series Cinéma Pauvre
- 2006 : Running Always, 10 minutes, video issue in the series Cinéma pauvre
- 2007 : Vince, 26 ans, 10 minutes, video issue in the series Cinéma pauvre
- 2011 : What will happen to silence, 8 minutes, video issue in the series Hantologies
- 2011 : How many pages, 5 minutes, video issue in the series Hantologies
