= Yoi Kawakubo =

- 川久保ジョイ
- Born: 1979 (age 46–47); Toledo, Spain
- Education: University of Tsukuba
- Known for: Photography, Installation, Video
- Awards: Ohara Museum of Art Prize (2015)

Yoi Kawakubo (Japanese: 川久保ジョイ, romanized: Kawakubo Joi, born 1979) is a Japanese multidisciplinary artist based in London and Tokyo.

His practice covers photography, video, and spatial installations, often incorporating sensory elements such as scents and mixology to explore themes of identity, historical research, and invisible systems like global finance and nuclear radiation. Initially trained in applied neuropsychology at the University of Tsukuba, Kawakubo worked as a financial trader before transitioning to a full-time artistic career in 2008; his subsequent work has been shaped by the socio-historical impact of the 2011 triple disaster in Japan.

== Career ==
Following the 2011 Fukushima nuclear disaster, Kawakubo began visiting the affected region and developing works that respond to the environmental and temporal consequences of nuclear technology. In 2013, Kawakubo visited the Fukushima exclusion zone and created works by burying large-format silver halide film sheets at various locations. The resulting works, titled If the Radiance of a Thousand Suns Were to Burst at Once into the Sky (2014–), have been described as documenting the aftermath of catastrophe through slow, material and chemical processes. The title is drawn from the Bhagavad Gita and references the words spoken by Robert Oppenheimer upon witnessing the first atomic explosion at Trinity, New Mexico.

A related work, Ten Sheets of Instant Film (2013), involved burying instant film in light-tight cases near the Fukushima Daiichi plant and retrieving them at varying intervals; films left longest underground showed the greatest degree of whitening, attributed to the accumulative effects of radiation.

Kawakubo has participated in international exhibitions including the Yokohama Triennale (2017 and 2020), Roppongi Crossing at the Mori Art Museum in Tokyo (2019), and Linguamania at the Ashmolean Museum in Oxford (2017).
