= Makenzy Orcel =

Haitian writer

Makenzy Orcel (born 1983) is a Haitian novelist and poet who writes in French. His novel L'Ombre animale received the Prix Louis-Guilloux and Prix Littérature-Monde in 2016. His 2022 novel Une somme humaine was one of the four finalists for the Prix Goncourt. It later received the United States Choix Goncourt. Orcel was awarded the Anna Seghers Prize in 2023.

== Career ==
Orcel and French writer Nicolas Idier published Une boîte de nuit à Calcutta, a jointly written work that developed from their encounters and correspondence. His first novel, Les Immortelles, was first published in 2010. Set in Port-au-Prince around the time of the 2010 Haiti earthquake. The novel centres on the lives of sex workers in the city. Orcel published ''Une somme humaine'' in 2022. The novel reached the final four of that year's Prix Goncourt.
