= Imperium (Kracht novel) =

2012 novel by Christian Kracht

- First edition cover
- Author: Christian Kracht
- Translator: Daniel Bowles
- Language: German
- Publisher: Kiepenheuer & Witsch
- Publication date: 16 February 2012
- Publication place: Germany
- English publication date: July 2015
- Pages: 256
- ISBN: 978-3-462-04131-6

Imperium is a 2012 novel by the Swiss writer Christian Kracht. It recounts the story of August Engelhardt, a German who in the early 20th century founded a religious order in German New Guinea based on nudism and a diet consisting solely of coconuts. The fictionalized narrative is an ironic pastiche.

The novel was well received by readers and literature critics alike and in 2012 was awarded the Wilhelm Raabe Literature Prize.

== Plot ==
August Engelhardt is the author of an 1898 pamphlet entitled A Carefree Future, where he describes a utopian society founded on nudism and a diet of coconuts, so-called cocovorism. An ardent vegetarian, Engelhardt argues that just as man is God's embodiment in the animal kingdom, so too is the coconut God's embodiment in the plant kingdom; cocovorism, he concludes, is therefore the path to divinity. Fleeing the persecution he endured for his peculiarities, Engelhardt travels from Germany to the Bismarck Archipelago in German New Guinea to realize his ideas on a coconut plantation. During a stop in Ceylon, however, he meets a Tamil named Govindarajan, who also claims to be a fruitarian, in order to gain Engelhardt's trust, before robbing him of his savings. Engelhardt arrives destitute at Herbertshöhe, where he meets Emma Forsayth, known as Queen Emma, from whom he acquires the island Kabakon on credit. He also meets a sailor named Christian Slütter who studies to become a captain. Engelhardt establishes his order and hires natives as laborers for the coconut plantation, financing everything through loans and credit. He practices nudism, eats nothing but coconuts and begins advertising his new paradise abroad.

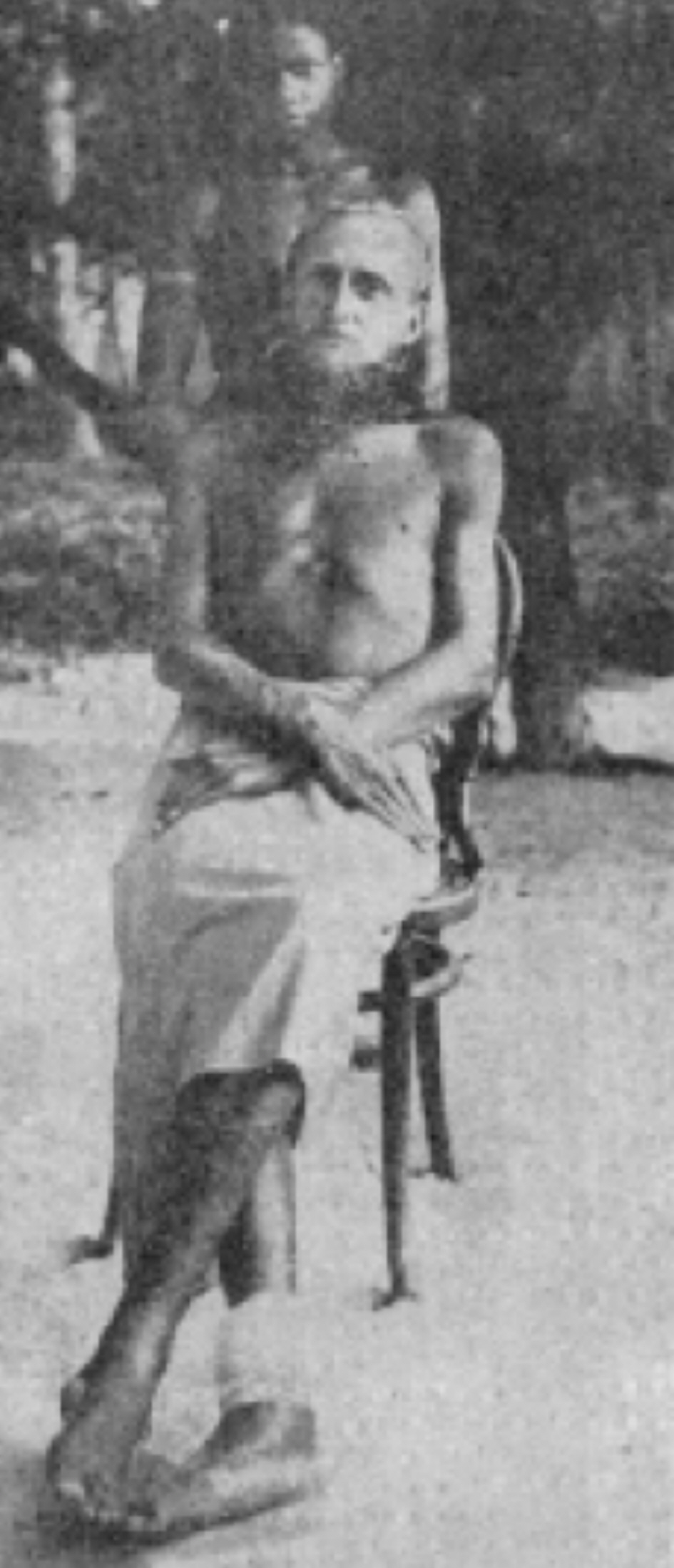
August Engelhardt on Kabakon in 1911

The first to answer Engelhardt's call to Kabakon and the Order of the Sun is a German named Aueckens. His initial rapport with Engelhardt crumbles when the latter discovers that he is both a homosexual and an antisemite, neither of which Engelhardt approves of. Shortly after raping Makeli, a native boy, Aueckens is found dead under mysterious circumstances. According to the perfunctory police report, he died from a falling coconut. Engelhardt then hears about a project in Fiji similar to his own, which heartens and intrigues him. A man named Mittenzwey is said to be a light eater who nourishes himself only with sunlight. Engelhardt visits Mittenzwey but discovers him to be a fraud, who in collaboration with Govindarajan accepts expensive gifts from his followers but eats food in secret.

Several years later, Max Lützow, a popular German musician suffering from hypochondria who has grown tired of the bourgeois lifestyle in Europe, arrives at Kabakon to join Engelhardt's order. His ailments soon cured, Lützow writes to German newspapers and praises cocovorism. While garnering ridicule in Germany, Lützow's letters nevertheless entice a group of young, ill-prepared Germans to embark for the Bismarck Archipelago, where they arrive destitute and fall prey to tropical diseases. Disgusted by their squalidness, Engelhardt finds them unworthy disciples and agrees to send them back home to unburden the colony. After a few years Engelhardt and Lützow fall out with each other, and the latter leaves the island. He marries Emma Forsayth but dies tragically and grotesquely immediately after the hasty wedding ceremony.

Engelhardt, abandoned, undernourished, paranoid and ill with leprosy, eventually becomes a problem for Albert Hahl, the Governor of Rabaul. Hahl hires Christian Slütter to shoot Engelhardt. When Slütter arrives at Kabakon, Engelhardt has rejected most of his philosophy, developed an abstruse antisemitic conspiracy theory, and now advocates cannibalism as the path to divinity. All the native islanders have left the plantation except Makeli, who is missing two fingers. Slütter reveals Hahl's request but refrains from killing Engelhardt.

As the years pass, Engelhardt becomes a minor zoo attraction for curious gawkers, among them Emil Nolde. During World War I, Kabakon is seized by Australian soldiers, and Engelhardt vanishes into the rainforest. After World War II, American soldiers discover the aged Engelhardt in a cave on the island of Kolombangara. He has survived by eating nuts, grass and bugs, and his leprosy has disappeared. Engelhardt tells his life story to an eager American reporter, and his biography is turned into a Hollywood film.

== Origin ==
The real Engelhardt died in 1919, while Kracht's character lives until after World War II. Early in the novel Engelhardt is likened to Adolf Hitler. Kracht has stated that his idea behind this was that Engelhardt and Hitler drew ideas from the same period's "overall esoteric panorama."

== Publication ==
The German edition was published by Kiepenheuer & Witsch on 16 February 2012. Two weeks after the release it had sold 80,000 copies. An English translation by Daniel Bowles was published by Farrar, Straus and Giroux in 2015. It has also been published in Spanish, Croatian, Korean, Turkish, French, Danish, Hungarian, Slovenian, Estonian, Russian, Swedish, Italian, Ukrainian, Macedonian, Hebrew, Norwegian, Dutch, Lithuanian, Romanian and Czech, with Portuguese, Mongolian, Serbian, and Bulgarian versions in preparation.

== Reception ==
=== Critical response ===
Rheinische Post's literature critic Lothar Schröder wrote:

It is a book about visions, about a romantic, about German history up to World War II—and all of that is written in a light, self-ironic tone, so that every page is a bright reading pleasure. Kracht finds a language like it was perhaps 100 years ago, so neatly stilted, twirled, charmingly long-winded, always witty, often humorous. ... One should, no, one must celebrate Kracht—cult writer of Faserland and 1979. The only opportunity to do so is to read him.

Richard Kämmerlings wrote in Die Welt:

In ironic-divine omniscience [Kracht] designs a historical panorama where Engelhardt's vision is woven in. ... Mann, Kafka and Hermann Hesse appear in small episodes incognito, but still clearly recognisable (very loosely motivated), others wave with fence posts thick as ship's masts, such as Joseph Conrad's Heart of Darkness. At one point an Italian passenger steamship named "Pasticcio" sails by.

Kämmerlings compared Imperium to Marc Buhl's novel Das Paradies des August Engelhardt, which also is about Engelhardt:

Kracht is more playful, more irreverent, more unconcerned, one could also say: more wild. This is not only evident in how he, with a formulation like "in a nutshell" [in nuce], mischievously asks for forgiveness—considering the excessive amount of nut aromas the story contains already in its raw state. But also in the plotting, shy of no peddling and no melodramatic turn.

In the United States, Publishers Weekly wrote:

Alternately languid and feverish, the narrative is as nutty as Engelhardt's prized foodstuff. The story bounces around in time, shifts in tone from philosophical to suspenseful to slapstick, features cameos from peculiar historical figures (such as the American inventor of Vegemite spread), and periodically widens its scope to consider the menacing rise of Nazism. Though Kracht, whose books have been translated into more than 25 languages, occasionally flaunts his research and succumbs to an overwrought style, he inventively captures the period's zeitgeist through one incurable eccentric.

And Huffington Post writes:

Creepy, unsettling and morbidly funny, Imperium takes the unlikely subjects of South Seas adventure and coconut eating to weave a satirical spin on ideological extremism.

=== Public debate ===
A critic for Der Spiegel, Georg Diez, triggered a public debate in German newspapers by accusing Kracht of propounding a "racist worldview" in Imperium. Diez wrote of Kracht: "He is, quite simply, the bouncer of right-wing thoughts. In his example we can see how anti-modern, anti-democratic, totalitarian thinking finds its way into the mainstream." These claims were subsequently disputed in the culture sections of the largest German newspapers, including Die Zeit, Die Tageszeitung, Frankfurter Rundschau, Der Tagesspiegel, Die Welt and Frankfurter Allgemeine Zeitung. In an open letter to the editor-in-chief of Der Spiegel, 17 authors criticized Diez for systematically equating a literary figure's utterances and ideas with those of its author. "If this kind of literary journalism were to catch on," they write, "it would spell the end of literary imagination, of fiction, irony, and ultimately of free art." The letter was signed by Daniel Kehlmann, Nobel Prize winner Elfriede Jelinek, Monika Maron, Uwe Timm and Katja Lange-Müller, among others. Kehlmann reckoned that Kracht has a fascination for the aesthetics of totalitarian states but that this is something different from what Diez attacked him for.

=== Accolades ===
The novel was awarded the Wilhelm Raabe Literature Prize of 30,000 euros from the City of Braunschweig. The jury described the book as "a grotesque genre painting of the early 20th century." In Switzerland it was awarded one of four Literature Prizes of the Canton of Bern. It has won the 2016 Helen and Kurt Wolff Translator's Prize, and was longlisted for the 2017 International Dublin Literary Award.

== Adaptations ==
A stage adaptation written and directed by Jan Bosse premiered on 26 April 2015 at the Thalia in der Gaußstraße in Hamburg. Another play based on the novel premiered on 25 February 2016 at the Vienna Schauspielhaus. It was written by Jan-Christoph Gockel and Tobias Schuster and directed by Gockel. According to The Hollywood Reporter, a German film adaptation was in pre-production in January 2015. The film were to be directed by Jan-Ole Gerster and star Tom Schilling as Engelhardt.

== See also ==
- German colonial empire
- Emma: Queen of the South Seas
