= Emma Forsayth =

Samoan-American princess and businesswoman

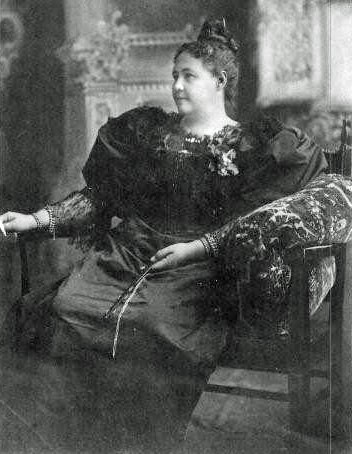
- Emma Coe Kolbe (known as Queen Emma) 1896 in San Francisco
- Born: Emma Eliza Coe; 26 September 1850; Apia, Samoa
- Died: 21 July 1913 (aged 62); Monte Carlo, Monaco
- Other names: Princess Tui Mālietoa Coe; Queen Emma; Emma Forsayth; Emma Farrell; Emma Kolbe
- Spouse(s): James Forsayth (m. 1869; lost at sea); Thomas Farrell (m. ?; died 1886); Paul Kolbe (m. 1893; died 1913)
- Children: Jonas Myndersse Coe Forsayth
- Parents: Jonas Myndersse Coe (father); Joana Le'utu Taletale (mother)

Emma Eliza Coe (September 26, 1850, in Apia, Samoa – July 21, 1913, in Monte Carlo, Monaco; formally styled Princess Tui Mālietoa Coe) was a Samoan-American princess and businesswoman who became the most prominent woman in commercial enterprise across Melanesia. Born to Joana Le'utu Taletale, a member of the Samoan royal Mālietoa dynasty, and Jonas Myndersse Coe, a representative of the United States in Apia, she was recognized at birth by her Mālietoa family with the royal title, Princess Tui Mālietoa Coe, which conferred land rights and privileges. Known via her three successive marriages as Emma Forsayth, Emma Farrell, and Emma Kolbe, she became recognized throughout the Pacific as Queen Emma — a designation earned through both her royal Samoan ancestry and her substantial economic influence in the region.

== Biography ==
Emma Eliza Coe was born on 26 September 1850 in Apia, Samoa. Her father was Jonas Myndersse Coe, a United States commercial representative. Her mother was Joana Le'utu Taletale, a member of the Samoan Mālietoa dynasty. Her mother's bloodline was related to the Moli tribe, and Emma was recognized by the Mālietoa as a princess. At the age of twelve, she entered the school at Subiaco, near Parramatta, to be educated for a time in the care of the Benedictine Nuns.

In 1869, she married a Scottish seaman named James Forsayth. Together they set up a shipping and trading business in Samoa. Emma Coe participated in island politics with her father but fell out of favor with the local population after he was deported in 1876. Around this time, her husband was said to be lost at sea, but there was no confirmation that he was dead.

In 1878, she left Samoa with an Australian trader, Thomas Farrell, who was known as a blackbirder, captain, and trader for the Duke of York Islands in between New Britain and New Ireland. There they traded mainly copra with the local population for beads, tobacco, knives, and mirrors. The area where Emma and Farrell traded was largely unsettled by Europeans, in part due to resistance from the local population.

Emma and Farrell were to assist people who were involved in the Marquis de Rays incident, when over 500 people were swindled out of their life savings to form a new colony at the southeastern tip of New Ireland. Four ships sailed from France between January 1880 and August 1881: the Chandernagore, Genil, India, and Neu-Bretagne. This practically marooned the colonists while the founder reported the progress of the colony in an extremely positive light in his newspaper, La Nouvelle France, in Paris. Emma and Farrell assisted the marooned colonists in moving to Australia. De Rays was later tried and found guilty of fraud in France.

In 1881, Emma became interested in land around the Gazelle Peninsula of New Britain and differed with Farrell, who continued trading. Emma bought the land from the local chiefs and with the assistance of her Anglo-German brother-in-law, Richard Parkinson, set up a large coconut and cocoa plantation around Kokopo, East New Britain.

In 1893, Emma married Paul Kolbe, a German colonial official and former army captain who was nearly fifteen years her junior. Her commercial empire was still in full swing when she learned of increasing tensions between Germany and Britain in the colonies and Europe towards the end of 1907. Emma sold off most of her assets in c. 1910 to Heinrich Rudolph Wahlen of Hamburgische Südsee AG.

She died in Monte Carlo in 1913, and her ashes were subsequently buried in New Guinea.

== Legacy ==
Forsyth is portrayed by Barbara Carrera in the 1988 television serial Emma: Queen of the South Seas, which was directed by John Banas for Australia's Network 10. She is featured in Christian Kracht's 2012 novel Imperium, which focuses on August Engelhardt.

== Sources ==
- Salesa, Damon (2014). "Emma and Phebe: Weavers of the Border" (PDF). The Journal of the Polynesian Society. 123 (2): 145–167. doi:10.15286/jps.123.2.145-167. Archived from the original (PDF) on 2022-10-06.
- Parkinson, Richard (2000). White, J. Peter; Dennison, John (eds.). Thirty years in the South Seas : land and people, customs and traditions in the Bismarck Archipelago and on the German Solomon Islands. University of Hawaii Press. ISBN 0-8248-2245-5.
- Robson, Robert William (1971). Queen Emma: The Samoan-American girl who founded an empire in 19th century New Guinea (4th ed.). Sydney: Pacific Publications. ISBN 0-858-07002-2.
