= Eurotrash =

Eurotrash may refer to:

- Eurotrash (term), derogatory term used for certain Europeans, especially in the United States
- Eurotrash (album), 2001 album of Norwegian industrial rock band Zeromancer
- Eurotrash (novel), 2021 novel by Christian Kracht
- Eurotrash (TV series), late-night British comedy series from 1993 to 2007
- "Eurotrash", 1994 short story by Irvine Welsh in the collection The Acid House
- "Eurotrash", 1997 song by Celtic punk band Dropkick Murphys on Boys on the Docks
- Eurotrash (film), 2026 German film

== See also ==
- "Euro-Trash Girl", 1994 song by Cracker, an American rock band
- Trailer trash
- White trash
