= Albert Hahl =

German colonial governor

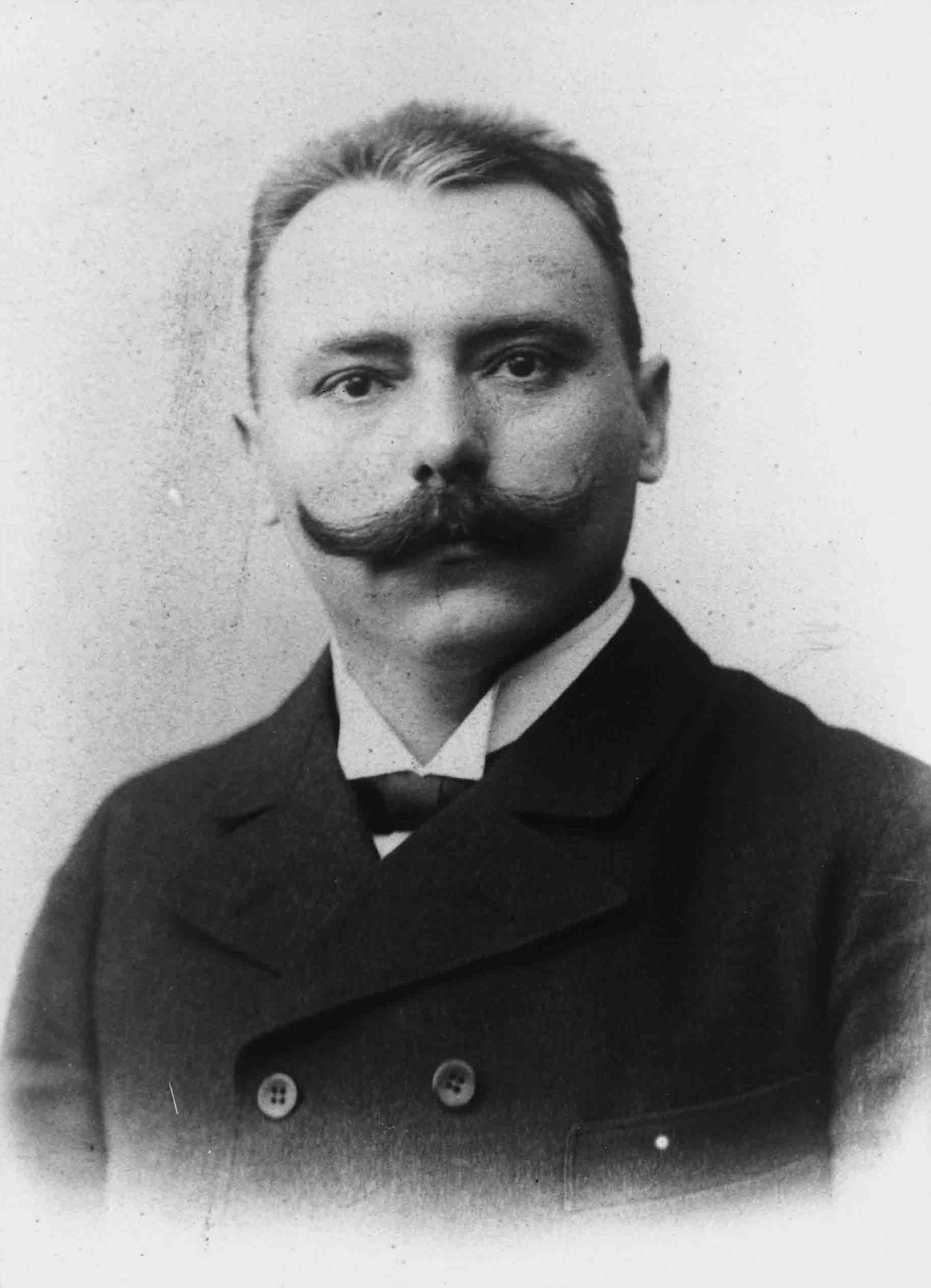
Albert Hahl c. 1905

Albert Hahl (1868–1945) was a German colonial administrator. In 1897, he was acting Landeshauptmann of the German New Guinea Company. After this he was appointed Governor of German New Guinea from 10 July 1901 to 13 April 1914. During his time as governor, he founded the town of Rabaul in 1903, by 1910 the offices of the government moved there from Kokopo, making Rabaul the official capital of the colony. Hahl is featured in Christian Kracht's 2012 novel Imperium, which focuses on August Engelhardt.

== Life ==
Albert Hahl was born in 1868 in Eggenfelden as the son of a Protestant brewer. After attending grammar school in Freising, he studied law and economics in Würzburg from 1887. During his studies he became a member of the Academic-Musical Association Würzburg. After his appointment as a government assessor in 1894, he worked in the Bavarian Ministry of the Interior in Bayreuth. In 1895 Hahl joined the colonial department of the Foreign Office. From January 1896 to December 1898, he was an imperial judge and official in the Bismarck Archipelago (Herbertshöhe), as well as an administrative official in St. Stephan's Port in the then "protected area" of the German New Guinea Company. After the sudden death of Curt von Hagen, Albert Hahl served from 15 August 1897 to 11 September 1897 as acting governor of the German New Guinea Company. After a short period of employment in the colonial department of the Foreign Office, he was entrusted in 1899 as Lieutenant Governor of the Eastern Caroline Islands based in Ponape(Pohnpei) with the administration of the island territory of German Micronesia, newly acquired by the German-Spanish Treaty of 1899 this territory located east of the 148th degree longitude, including the Marshall Islands and Nauru.

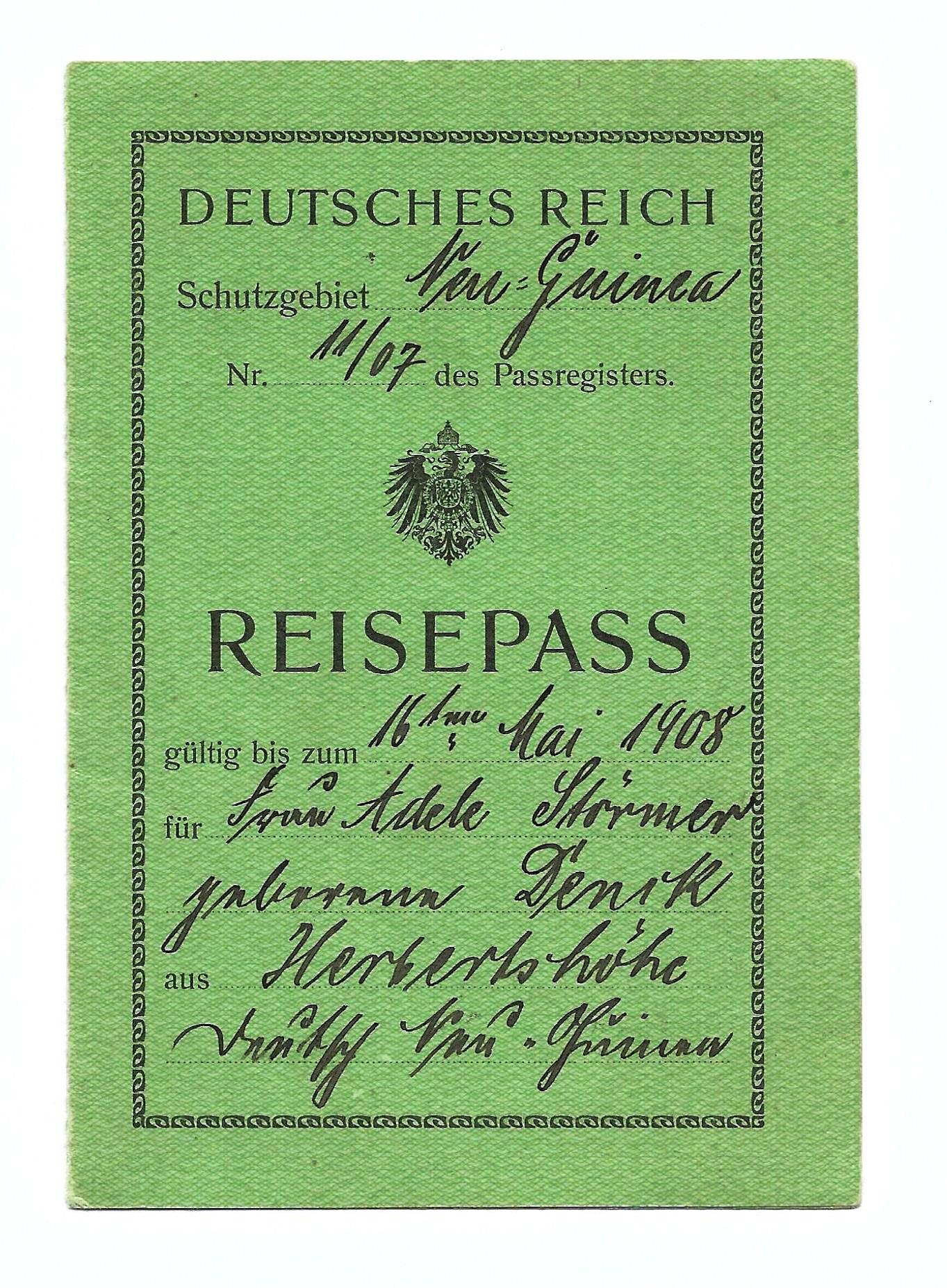
Exceptionally rare New Guinea passport

After the resignation of Rudolf von Bennigsen, Albert Hahl served as deputy governor on 10 July 1901. He returned to Germany in June 1902 because of a disease of blackwater fever, where he was finally appointed governor of German New Guinea on November 20, 1902. He held this office until April 13, 1914. Hahl took part in the exploration of the country and in 1908, accompanied by two other Europeans, first crossed Bougainville. Shortly after his arrival in New Guinea, he had already lived among the Tolai people and learned their language.

== Personal life and marriage ==
On 1 February 1903 Dr. Albert Hahl was married to Luise Bartha Marie von Seckendorff (1875-1903) of the noble House of Seckendorff. They were married in Genoa, Liguria, Italy in a Protestant church in the city. With Luise he would have three children.

During his service as Governor of German New Guinea Hahl had a relationship with a local Tolai woman, with whom he had a single child.

== Policies ==
=== Luluai System ===
In order to introduce an effective and conflict-free administration, Hahl appointed indigenous village chiefs (Luluai), who were to represent the bridge between the German administration and the locals. The Luluai were responsible for local administration, Jurisprudence on land issues, etc. took place only by the imperial judges. The Luluai earned up to 300 marks a month. In return, they had to meet quotas of unpaid work and collect the poll tax (since 1906), of which they were allowed to use 10% for themselves. This form of indirect administration reduced the influence of traditional powers and tied the native population to the colonial economic system. However, the Luluai system could not be operated without conflict because of its privileges for individuals and the abolition of the former village order. Among others, Sacred Heart Missionaries helped to establish it, as they were able to serve the process of colonization because of their knowledge of the country. During their missionary work, however, they also came into conflict with locals, which led, among other things, to the Baining Massacre in 1904, in which Father Matthäus Rascher and nine other missionaries and missionary sisters were murdered. The later addition of several government stations to the Luluai system was intended to reduce punitive expeditions, as was customary with Hahl's predecessor Rudolf von Bennigsen.

=== Land tenure rights and economic policies ===
As early as 1899, Hahl had ensured that the right to acquire land from the local village communities or simply to take possession of uninhabited territory lay exclusively with the governorate, which took great care to ensure that no property rights of the locals were violated when reselling. Since 1903, the existing ownership structure has also been checked for accuracy. Thus, between 1903 and 1914, more than 5,740 hectares, which had already become the property of European planters, were returned to the village communities and a total of 70 inalienable reserves with a total size of 13,115 hectares were created. The real potential for conflict, however, lay in the vast territories that had been acquired by the German New Guinea Company, which were never officially surveyed or evaluated to what extent the acquisition had curtailed local rights.

Every New Guinean had to have at least one hectare of land to settle and cultivate. Cash crops, especially Coconut palm, were to be grown on this land. In this way, Hahl wanted to ensure that the New Guineans themselves could participate in the colonial economic system and were not forced to work on European plantations. In 1914, almost half of the Copra exports came from the cultivation of the natives from the Gazelle Peninsula, while the mainland population around Madang was forced to work on the plantations of the German New Guinea Company due to the loss of their lands.

However, Hahl was never able to fully enforce the detailed regulations that had been established for local workers regarding wages, duration of work and medical care, as well as the abolition of female forced labor against the New Guinea Company and other German plantation owners.

=== Education and medical care ===
Under Hahl's reign, three government and two mission hospitals were established, in which, in addition to caring for the population, young locals received basic medical training and returned to their villages after a few months as medical Luluais (medical chief).

Education also grew rapidly, and by the time Hahl left New Guinea in 1914, there were over 600 primary schools, six craft schools, and one school for interpreters. The school enrolment rate of 3.2% was higher than in most African colonies.

== Later life, retirement and death ==
After his retirement, he became director of the New Guinea Company in 1918, a more formal position after the loss of the colonies in World War I.

During the Weimar Republic, Hahl was a strong proponent of colonial revisionism. During the Nazi era, Hahl maintained contact with the Solf Circle, which had formed around the widow of the former governor of German Samoa, Wilhelm Solf, and can be assigned to the resistance against National-socialism. Hahl did not join the NSDAP, however, he was a consultant for South Sea issues in The Colonial Policy Office of the NSDAP.

== Literature ==
- Peter Biskup, "Dr. Albert Hahl – Sketch of a German Colonial Official," in The Australian Journal of Politics and History 14 (1968), pp. 342–357.
- Peter Biskup: Hahl at Herbertshoehe, 1896–1898: The Genesis of German Native Administration in New Guinea, in: K. S. Inglis (ed.): History of Melanesia, Canberra - Port Moresby 1969, 2nd ed. 1971, 77–99.
- Norbert Fischer: Hahl, Albert. In: Neue Deutsche Biographie (NDB). Volume 7, Duncker & Humblot, Berlin 1966, ISBN 3-428-00188-5, p. 495 (digitized).
- N. Gash – J. Whittaker, Pictorial History of New Guinea, Jacaranda Press: Milton, Queensland 1975, ISBN 1-86273-025-3
- Ingrid Moses, The Extension of Colonial Rule in Kaiser Wilhelmsland, in: John A. Moses and Paul M. Kennedy (eds.), Germany in the Pacific and Far East, 1870-1914, St. Lucia 1977, 288–312.
- Peter J. Hempenstall: Pacific Islanders under German Rule. Australian National University Presses; Canberra 1978, 264 pp., ISBN 978-0-7081-1350-9
- Stewart Firth: New Guinea under Germans. Melbourne University Press, 1983, ISBN 978-0-522-84220-3
- Hermann Joseph Hiery: The Neglected War. The German South Pacific and the Influence of World War I, University of Hawai'i Press: Honolulu 1995, 387 pp., ISBN 0-8248-1668-4
- Horst Gründer: History of the German colonies. Schöningh 5th edition, Paderborn 2004, ISBN 3-8252-1332-3
- Hermann Joseph Hiery (ed.): Die Deutsche Südsee 1884–1914. 2nd edition. Verlag Ferdinand Schöningh, Paderborn 2001, ISBN 3-506-73912-3
- Clive Moore; Jacqueline Leckie; Doug Munro (ed.): Labour in the South Pacific. James Cook University, Townsville 1990
- Gerdi Kempfler: Gern - New Guinea and back: Dr. Albert Hahl - Imperial Judge and Governor 1896 - 1914, self-published, Gern 2002.
