= The Ministry of Truth (disambiguation) =

The Ministry of Truth is a fictional government ministry from George Orwell's novel Nineteen Eighty-Four.

The Ministry of Truth may also refer to:

- The Ministry of Truth (Kracht book), a 2006 book of photographs from North Korea's capital
- The Ministry of Truth (Lynskey book), a 2019 history of Orwell’s novel
- "Ministry of Truth", a satirical name for Ukraine’s Ministry of Information Policy
- "Ministry of Truth", a satirical name for the United States Department of Homeland Security's Disinformation Governance Board

== See also ==
- The Department of Truth, a comic book series
- Ministry of Love (disambiguation)
