= Der gelbe Bleistift =

2000 book by Christian Kracht

- Author: Christian Kracht
- Language: German
- Genre: travel literature
- Publisher: Kiepenheuer & Witsch
- Publication date: 2000
- Publication place: Germany
- Pages: 195
- ISBN: 9783462029055

Der gelbe Bleistift. Reisegeschichten aus Asien (lit. 'The Yellow Pencil. Travel Stories from Asia') is a 2000 book by the Swiss writer Christian Kracht. It is a collection of travel writing originally published in Welt am Sonntag.

== Summary ==
The book collects 20 pieces of Christian Kracht's travel writing originally published in a Welt am Sonntag column from 1992 to 1999. It mainly covers Southeast Asia and includes reflections on places including Phnom Penh, Peshawar, Vientiane, Tokyo and Yangon.

== Reception ==
Henrike Thomsen of Der Spiegel called Kracht "a master of suggestion", who shows both amazement and respect for the contradictions he observes, and whose desire to be cool makes him describe also the most odd situations in a detached manner. Thomsen wrote that a fear of being confused with the tourists and old hippies Kracht encounters may be the reason for his "pseudo-aristocratic disgust", and that this disgust provides some insightful observations.

Enno Stahl of Deutschlandfunk compared the book to Kracht's debut novel Faserland, where the narrator describes his observations with faux naivety, calling both books reminiscent of Walter Serner's dandy literature, where everything is a pose but manages to say things about the author. He wrote that Kracht "is not real pop culture", calling Kracht's comparisons between the arbitrary popular culture he participates in at home and his observations in Southeast Asia insightful. Stahl compared the texts to the essays of Botho Strauss but also called them forgettable.

Christina Jung of Literaturkritik.de wrote that the book avoids what is expected from the genre, such as personal impressions, tips for visitors or condemnations of Western imperialism. She called Kracht funny and knowledgeable, while showcasing a "non-committal, snobbish and shallow" attitude that is typical for his generation of German-language writers.
