= Ferien für immer =

1998 book by Christian Kracht and Eckhart Nickel

- Author: Christian Kracht; Eckhart Nickel
- Language: German
- Genre: Travel literature
- Publisher: Kiepenheuer & Witsch
- Publication date: 1998
- Publication place: Germany
- Pages: 195
- ISBN: 9783462027082

Ferien für immer. Die angenehmsten Orte der Welt (lit. 'Vacation forever. The most pleasant locations in the world') is a 1998 book of travel writing by Christian Kracht and Eckhart Nickel.

== Summary ==
The book consists of 66 travel reports, one to three pages long, from different locations around the world. It is presented as a guide to the authors' favourite places to visit and mostly covers hotels, bars and cafés. The texts occasionally include short musings on literature, art, history, music or fashion. Some anecdotes are fictional and intentionally written as obvious lies.

== Reception ==
Bernhard Lill of Der Spiegel wrote he did not understand the purpose of the book, which he called a "pseudo-tour guide" that is "filled, but not with content". He wrote that some of the anecdotes are funny, such as an obviously untrue story from a bar in Jerusalem where the authors witnessed Benjamin Netanyahu celebrating his election victory drunk and naked except for a Palestinian scarf. Lill criticised Kracht's writing style, which he said is influenced by Thomas Mann's long sentences but lack their content. He wrote that both authors fail to live up to their role models such as Peter Fleming and Evelyn Waugh. Ulla Biernat of Literaturkritik.de wrote that the book, with its ironic subtitle, is made for "bored postmodern tourists". She summarised it as a book where places are "judged by the presence of other tourists and by the bizarreness of the hotels, restaurants and discos: tourist means a big minus, 'alcoholic's paradise' a fine plus".
