= The Dead (Kracht novel) =

2016 novel by Christian Kracht

- Cover of the first edition
- Author: Christian Kracht
- Original title: Die Toten
- Translator: Daniel Bowles
- Language: German
- Publisher: Kiepenheuer & Witsch
- Publication date: 8 September 2016
- Publication place: Germany
- English publication date: 17 July 2018
- Pages: 224
- ISBN: 978-3-462-04554-3

The Dead (German: Die Toten) is a 2016 gothic novel by the Swiss writer Christian Kracht, his fifth novel. It is set in the film industry at the end of the Weimar era and tells the story of a (fictional) Swiss director, Emil Nägeli, and a Japanese government official (Masahiko Amakasu) who try to create a collaboration between German and Japanese cinema. The plot centers around the May 15 Incident.

The narrative is structured like a Noh play with three acts. The language is inspired by the works of Thomas Mann, with many archaic words and expressions. As in all historiographic metafiction, there are historic characters acting out of time and character – one of the protagonists is a highly unsympathetic Charlie Chaplin, while there are longer appearances by Lotte Eisner, Ernst Hanfstaengel, Siegfried Kracauer and Fritz Lang.

In telling the story of cinema’s development from silent to sound film, the novel considers the issue of "performance" – both in terms of individual identity and the social norms that represent the background to the performing of this identity.

== Publication ==
The book was published on 8 September 2016 through Kiepenheuer & Witsch in Cologne. The cover art for the original German edition features the 1926 painting Night Rain on Shinohashi Bridge by the Japanese print artist Hasui Kawase.

An English translation by Daniel Bowles was published on 17 July 2018 through Farrar, Straus and Giroux. American hardcover first editions feature a George Hurrell portrait of Jean Harlow on the cover. Greek, Russian, Swedish, Danish, Italian, Korean, Polish, Croatian, French, Latvian, Lithuanian and Norwegian translations have been published, while Albanian, Malayalam, Japanese and Mongolian translations are in preparation.

== Reception ==
Eric Banks of Bookforum wrote, "The Dead reads like a reboot of J. G. Ballard’s Crash, in a treatment by Wes Anderson, after a weekend spent binge-watching John Schlesinger’s version of The Day of the Locust. The result draws out a comically bleak but shakily ambiguous vision of the coming image-world of fascist politics and Tinseltown productions, and of how both authorized a new power of the screen in startlingly effective ways." Writing for the Los Angeles Review of Books Jan Wilm said, "Across the novel, Kracht leaves clues and tracks (perhaps traps) for the readers to connect (or tumble into), eschewing certainty through deliciously stimulating ambiguity in a remarkable, elegiac, sensual, often grotesque and hilarious novel." In The Times Literary Supplement, Wilm also noted the novel "politically astute, but also full of references to literary works – including Kracht’s own – and to a number of films – both real and invented. Daniel Bowles’s translation is excellent, though it sometimes lacks the beautifully modulated mannerisms of the original German, the languid pacing of Kracht’s prose and the quaint vocabulary that blends the idiom of the Weimar Republic and its aftermath with the vernacular of the present."

== Accolades ==
The book received the 2016 Swiss Book Prize and the 2016 Hermann-Hesse-Preis. It was nominated for the Bavarian Book Prize.

== See also ==
- Cinema of Germany
- Cinema of Japan
