= 1979 (disambiguation) =

1979 was a common year in the Gregorian calendar.

1979 may also refer to:

- "1979" (song), a 1996 song by the Smashing Pumpkins
- "1979" (Good Charlotte song), on the 2010 album Cardiology
- 1979 (novel), a 2001 novel by Christian Kracht
- "1979" (Our Friends in the North), a TV episode
