= Phantastik-Preis der Stadt Wetzlar =

German literary prize

Phantastik-Preis der Stadt Wetzlar is a literary prize of Hesse.

== Winners ==
- 1983 Wolfgang and Heike Hohlbein for Märchenmond
- 1984 Frederik Hetmann for Wagadu
- 1985 Johanna and Günter Braun for Der x-mal vervielfachte Held
- 1986 Bernd Kreimeier for Seterra
- 1987 Hubert Mania for Scintilla Seelenfunke
- 1988 Sigrid Heuck for Saids Geschichte
- 1989 Herbert W. Franke for Hiobs Stern
- 1990 Rafik Schami for Erzähler der Nacht
- 1991 Carl Amery for Das Geheimnis der Krypta
- 1992 not awarded
- 1993 Hanna Johansen for Über den Himmel
- 1994 Susanne Kaiser for Von Mädchen und Drachen
- 1995 Gert Heidenreich for Die Nacht der Händler
- 1996 Bernhard Kegel for Das Ölschieferskelett
- 1997 Harald Gerlach for Windstimmen
- 1998 Hansjörg Schneider for Das Wasserzeichen
- 1999 Alban Nikolai Herbst for Thetis. Anderswelt
- 2000 Gunter Gross for Der Gedankenleser
- 2001 Michael Wallner for Manhattan fliegt
- 2002 Jürgen Lodemann for Siegfried und Krimhild
- 2003 Zoran Drvenkar for Sag mir, was du siehst
- 2004 Cornelia Funke for Tintenherz
- 2005 Walter Moers for Die Stadt der Träumenden Bücher
- 2006 Gert Loschütz for Dunkle Gesellschaft. Roman in zehn Regennächten
- 2007 Thomas Glavinic for Die Arbeit der Nacht
- 2008 Robert Schneider for Die Offenbarung
- 2009 Christian Kracht for Ich werde hier sein im Sonnenschein und im Schatten
- 2010 Christiane Neudecker for Das siamesische Klavier
- 2011 Markus Orths for Die Tarnkappe
- 2012 Jochen Schimmang for Neue Mitte
- 2013 Annika Scheffel for Bevor alles verschwindet
- 2014 no award
- 2015 no award
- 2016 Antonia Michaelis for Niemand liebt November
- 2017 no award
- 2018 Thomas von Steinaecker for Die Verteidigung des Paradieses
- 2019 Antje Wagner for Hyde
- 2020 Joana Osman for Am Boden des Himmels
- 2021 Katharina Köller for Was ich im Wasser sah
- 2022 Sabrina Železný for Kondorkinder: Das Spiegelbuch und die verlorenen Geschichten
- 2023 Maja Ilisch for Unten
- 2024 Zara Zerbe for Phytopia Plus
