= Panikherz =

2016 book by Benjamin von Stuckrad-Barre

- Author: Benjamin von Stuckrad-Barre
- Language: German
- Genre: autobiographical novel; memoir
- Publisher: Kiepenheuer & Witsch
- Publication date: 10 March 2016
- Publication place: Germany
- Pages: 564
- ISBN: 9783462048858

Panikherz (lit. 'Panic Heart') is a 2016 memoir or autobiographical novel by the German writer Benjamin von Stuckrad-Barre. The author had become successful in the 1990s as part of the Popliteratur movement. He recounts his dream of a rockstar lifestyle, his subsequent drug abuse and how the singer Udo Lindenberg ends up helping him.

The Berliner Ensemble produced a stage adaptation in 2018, directed by Oliver Reese.
