= German pop literature =

Literary movement

German pop literature (German: Popliteratur or Pop-Literatur) has been a movement in German-language literature with multiple waves in the second half of the 20th century and early 21st century. It emerged in the 1960s, when it was heavily influenced by American beat literature, and was followed by a second generation in the 1980s that overlapped with punk subculture. It saw a renaissance in the 1990s and 2000s, when the concept became associated with several authors who received significant publicity.

== History ==
The term pop literature was coined by the Austrian poet H. C. Artmann in 1964 and seriously entered German literature when Rolf Dieter Brinkmann and Ralf-Rainer Rygulla published the anthology Acid. Neue amerikanische Szene in 1969. The wave of pop literature that followed was understood as a protest against the politics of post-war German literature represented by Group 47. The pop literature authors were initially very influenced by American beat literature, embraced commercial subcultures and wrote in everyday language.

A second wave of pop literature emerged in the early 1980s and its participants were more careful to distinguish themselves from the 1968 protest culture, with which the older pop literature had some overlap. This generation had overlap with punk subculture. It included Peter Glaser, Rainald Goetz and Diedrich Diederichsen.

The 1990s saw a major renaissance for German pop literature. Prominent works from this generation include Faserland (1995) by Christian Kracht and Soloalbum (1998) by Benjamin von Stuckrad-Barre. One of the more publicized events from this wave was when five pop literature authors—Stuckrad-Barre, Kracht, Eckhart Nickel, Alexander von Schönburg and Joachim Bessing—held a meeting at Hotel Adlon in Berlin in 1999, after which their pop cultural discussions were published in the book Tristesse Royale. Das popkulturelle Quintett.
