= Wilhelm Raabe Literature Prize =

German literary award

The Wilhelm Raabe Literature Prize (German: Wilhelm Raabe-Literaturpreis) is a German literary award established in 2000 by the city of Braunschweig and the radio broadcaster Deutschlandradio. It is named after the 19th-century writer Wilhelm Raabe and is awarded annually for a narrative work written in German. Until 2010, the prize was awarded every two years. The prize sum is €30,000, making it one of the most significant German literary awards after the Georg Büchner Prize, the Joseph-Breitbach-Preis, and the Siegfried Lenz Prize.

== Recipients ==
- 2000: Rainald Goetz for Abfall für alle
- 2002: Jochen Missfeldt for Gespiegelter Himmel
- 2004: Ralf Rothmann for Junges Licht
- 2006: Wolf Haas for Das Wetter vor 15 Jahren
- 2008: Katja Lange-Müller for Böse Schafe
- 2010: Andreas Maier (writer) for Das Zimmer
- 2011: Sibylle Lewitscharoff for Blumenberg
- 2012: Christian Kracht for Imperium
- 2013: Marion Poschmann for Die Sonnenposition
- 2014: Thomas Hettche for Pfaueninsel
- 2015: Clemens J. Setz for Die Stunde zwischen Frau und Gitarre
- 2016: Heinz Strunk for Der goldene Handschuh
- 2017: Petra Morsbach for Justizpalast
- 2018: Judith Schalansky for Verzeichnis einiger Verluste
- 2019: Norbert Scheuer for Winterbienen
- 2020: Christine Wunnicke for Die Dame mit der bemalten Hand
- 2021: Gert Loschütz for Besichtigung eines Unglücks
- 2022: Jan Faktor for Trottel
- 2023: Judith Hermann for Wir hätten uns alles gesagt
- 2024: Saša Stanišić for Möchte die Witwe angesprochen werden, platziert sie auf dem Grab die Gießkanne mit dem Ausguss nach vorne
- 2025: Jonas Lüscher for Verzauberte Vorbestimmung
- 2026: Shida Bazyar for Die Lücken

== Previous recipients ==
The award had until 1990 been known as the Wilhelm Raabe Prize.

- 1944 Ricarda Huch
- 1947 Fritz von Unruh
- 1948 Werner Bergengruen
- 1949 Ina Seidel
- 1950 Hermann Hesse
- 1954 Max Frisch
- 1957 Friedrich Georg Jünger
- 1960 Gerd Gaiser
- 1963 Hans Erich Nossack
- 1966 Heimito von Doderer
- 1972 Walter Kempowski
- 1975 Uwe Johnson
- 1978 Horst Bienek
- 1981 Hermann Lenz
- 1984 Alois Brandstetter
- 1987 Siegfried Lenz
- 1990 Gerhard Köpf
