= Eurotrash (novel) =

2021 novel by Christian Kracht

- Author: Christian Kracht
- Translator: Daniel Bowles
- Language: German
- Genre: Autobiographical novel
- Publisher: Kiepenheuer & Witsch
- Publication date: 4 March 2021
- Publication place: Germany
- English publication date: 2024
- Media type: Print, ebook, audiobook
- Pages: 224
- ISBN: 978-3-462-05083-7

Eurotrash is a 2021 autobiographical novel by Swiss writer Christian Kracht. His seventh novel, and a kind of sequel to his debut one, Faserland (1995), it is about a jaded middle-aged writer and his 80-year-old mother road tripping through their native Switzerland.

== Story ==
The novel follows a middle-aged protagonist in his 50s who shares Kracht's name and has also published a novel called Faserland. In this sense, some readers consider it autofiction.

Of a family that enriched itself through arms dealing, he travels through Switzerland with his mother trying to free them from their inherited fortune and to ameliorate the transgenerational guilt of this unethical legacy. Strained in their dysfunctional relationship, the two do not like each other very much and the mother is a terminally-ill addict of alcohol and pain killers who has just been discharged from a psychiatric institution. The two travel in a hired cab with CHF 600,000 in a plastic bag with the goal to hand it out to strangers. However, several issues complicate the plan and even withdrawing the cash becomes a demanding exercise of frustration.

Throughout the narrative, the two tell each other stories, many false and some true. The entire journey is built on a lie that the narrator will take his mother on a long-desired trip to Africa to see zebras.

== Reception ==
Upon its 2024 publication in the United Kingdom by Serpent's Tail, The Washington Post wrote "Quite simply a joy to read ... The narrator's mother is an unforgettable literary creation and Eurotrash is a brilliant and unsettling reckoning with history and memory, and with the ambiguities inherent in the art of writing fiction." Marcel Theroux wrote in The Guardian "Short but hefty, Eurotrash is a book about ageing that's steeped in a guilty knowingness about privilege, wealth and the 20th century. There's something bracing about the narrator's pained awareness that if there's such a thing as the wrong side of history, he and his family are firmly on it." The Times and the Financial Times chose the novel as one of the best books of 2024.

== Awards ==
The novel was longlisted for the International Booker Prize in 2025. The book was shortlisted for the German Book Prize and Swiss Book Prize.

== Adaptations ==
Different theatre versions have been staged at Vienna's Burgtheater, at Schaubühne in Berlin, at Thalia Theater in Hamburg and at Bern Theatre, in Switzerland. A Swedish version has premiered at Galeasen Theatre in Stockholm, in 2026. An English language adaptation is currently in production at the Young Vic in London, starring Kathryn Hunter and Ben Wishaw.

A film version of the novel of the same title, directed by Finsterwalder, starring Barbara Sukowa, Alexander Fehling and Luna Wedler premiered at the Filmkunstmesse Leipzig on 15 September 2026.
