= Ich werde hier sein im Sonnenschein und im Schatten =

Novel by Christian Kracht

- First edition cover
- Author: Christian Kracht
- Original title: Ich werde hier sein im Sonnenschein und im Schatten
- Language: German
- Published: 16 September 2008
- Publication place: Switzerland
- Pages: 160
- ISBN: 978-3-462-04041-8

Ich werde hier sein im Sonnenschein und im Schatten is a novel by Swiss writer Christian Kracht. It was published by Kiepenheuer & Witsch in September 2008. The title, translating to "I'll be here in sunshine and in shadow", is from the lyrics to the Irish folk song "Danny Boy".

The novel presents an alternate history of Switzerland in which Lenin did not leave Switzerland for Russia in 1917 to bring about the Russian Revolution. Instead, Lenin's revolution took place in Switzerland, transforming it into the Swiss Socialist Republic, a Communist state engaged in the colonisation of Africa and in perpetual war with other totalitarian empires, notably with a federation of British and German fascists. The plot of the novel, set in around 2010, traces a Swiss political commissar born in Nyasaland on a journey to the heart of the empire, the gigantic alpine Réduit, where he is to arrest Brazhinsky, an enemy of the state.

Ich werde hier sein's surreal setting and precise prose has garnered acclaim in the German-speaking literary world. Die Welt called it a "glorious horror story"; the Süddeutsche Zeitung praised the writing as not only deeply reminiscent of Ernst Jünger, but also as the "most beautiful German prose currently on offer" and Die Zeit hailed the work as "possibly the novel of the year". But the Frankfurter Rundschau 's reviewer discounted Ich werde hier sein as "simply moronic" and Die Tageszeitung found the text to be too diffuse and incoherent, amounting to just a "drug-clouded scenery".

The novel has been translated into Russian, Croatian, Swedish, Polish, Bulgarian, Korean, French, Norwegian, and Dutch.
