= Der Freund =

German literary magazine

Logo

Der Freund ("The Friend") was a literary magazine published by Axel Springer AG. It was produced by Christian Kracht (publisher) and Eckhart Nickel (editor-in-chief) in Kathmandu, Nepal.

Der Freund appeared every three months, with a total of eight editions between September 2004 and June 2006. Its visual style was elaborate, with artistic designs and arcane illustrations, and its range of (often light-hearted) material included essays, short stories, literary miniatures, poems, opinion columns and in-depth interviews. Most pieces were in German, but occasionally English or French. Der Freund was available for International Mailing.

Authors published in Der Freund included Ingo Niermann and Hans-Ulrich Obrist. Notable illustrators were Neue Slowenische Kunst and Fischli & Weiss. The magazine also reprinted pieces by major writers such as Allen Ginsberg and Truman Capote under licence. Interviewees included Albert Hofmann, Stanisław Lem, David Lynch and Nam June Paik.

Der Freund was critically acclaimed for its design and cover pages, and won two awards in 2006: a bronze award from the Art Directors Club of Germany for magazine design, and the gold prize for "cover of the year" from the LeadAcademy in Hamburg.
