= Barbara Carrera =

American model and actress

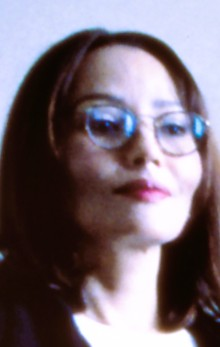
- Barbara Carrera circa 2004
- Born: Barbara Kingsbury c. 1943–50 (Note: Sources give conflicting dates on Carrera's birth year. Some cite 1947 or 1950, others claim 1943.); San Carlos, Nicaragua
- Occupations: Actress, model
- Years active: 1970–2004
- Spouses: Kurt von Hoffmann (m. 1966; div. 1972) Uwe Harden (m. 1972; div. 1976) Nicholas Mark Mavroleon (m. 1983, divorced)

Barbara Kingsbury Carrera is a Nicaraguan-born American retired actress, model, and painter. She is a two-time Golden Globe Award nominee, New Star of the Year – Actress for The Master Gunfighter (1975) and Best Supporting Actress – Motion Picture for the James Bond film Never Say Never Again (1983).

She is also known for her roles in The Island of Dr. Moreau (1977), Condorman (1981), I, the Jury (1982) and Lone Wolf McQuade (1983). Carrera also played Clay Basket on the miniseries Centennial (1978–79), and Angelica Nero on the ninth season of CBS prime time soap opera Dallas (1985–86).

== Early life ==
Barbara Kingsbury was born in San Carlos, Nicaragua. Her mother, Florencia Cajina Herrera, was Nicaraguan, and her father, Louis Kingsbury, was an American who worked for the US embassy in Nicaragua.

Sometime after the age of ten, Carrera moved to the United States to live with her father. She moved to New York at the age of 15.

== Career ==
Kingsbury began a career as a model at the Eileen Ford agency at the age of 17, at which point she changed her last name to her mother's maiden name, Carrera. Her first film appearance was a cameo as herself in Jerry Schatzberg's Puzzle of a Downfall Child (1970). In 1972, she appeared on the screen in a publicity role for Chiquita bananas. Carrera has appeared on the pages and covers of such magazines as Vogue, Paris Match, Harper's Bazaar, and twice posed for Playboy (July 1977 and March 1982).

In 1976, Carrera earned her first Golden Globe nomination ("New Star of the Year - Actress") for her role in The Master Gunfighter. She later appeared in such films as The Island of Dr. Moreau, Lone Wolf McQuade, Condorman, Point of Impact, Tryst and Embryo. For her portrayal of the villainess Fatima Blush in the James Bond film Never Say Never Again, she earned a 1984 Golden Globe nomination for "Best Performance by an Actress in a Supporting Role in a Motion Picture". She worked opposite Laurence Olivier in Wild Geese II the following year.

On television, Carrera played a part in the soap opera Dallas as Angelica Nero, and more prominently, in the historical miniseries Centennial in 1978 and Masada (opposite Peter O'Toole and Peter Strauss) in 1981. These roles brought her to the mainstream attention of American audiences. She also starred as Emma Eliza Cole in the miniseries Emma: Queen of the South Seas in 1988. Carrera appeared with fellow "Bond Girls" Maude Adams and Kristina Wayborn in That '70s Show episode "The First Time" (s2, e16, 2000) as bridesmaids for another former Bond Girl, Tanya Roberts, in the role of Midge Pinciotti. Since Paradise (2004), Carrera has not appeared in films or television.

In 1989, Carrera starred with Bette Davis in Wicked Stepmother, Davis's final film role, in which both actresses played mother and daughter witches. When Davis needed to appear younger, she would inhabit Carrera's body to attract young men.

In 1997, Carrera was appointed Ambassador-at-Large for Nicaragua and was given a Diplomatic passport by then-president Arnoldo Alemán.

Carrera is also a painter and her work has been showcased in the Makk Galleries, with Americo Makk, in Beverly Hills, California since the 1980s, and the Roy Miles Gallery in London, England. In May 2002, her works were exhibited at the Hollywood Entertainment Museum.

== Personal life ==
Carrera has been married and divorced three times, her spouses being:

- Kurt von Hoffman.
- Uwe Harden (born 1941), a German fashion model and actor. Married in 1972, they divorced in July 1976.
- Nicholas Mark Mavroleon, a Greek shipping magnate, who is the younger and only surviving son of Manuel Basil Mavroleon.

Between marriages, Carrera dated Robert Evans, Robert De Niro, Alexander Godunov, Philip Niarchos, Richard Gere, Timothy Dalton, Ryan O'Neal. and her longest-lasting relationship was with journalist Cameron Docherty. After her third marriage, she was involved with Henry Percy, 11th Duke of Northumberland, the godson of Queen Elizabeth II.

Carrera has no children.

== Filmography ==
=== Film ===
| Year | Title | Role | Notes |
|---|---|---|---|
| 1975 | The Master Gunfighter | Eula | Nominated — Golden Globe Award for New Star of the Year – Actress |
| 1976 | Embryo | Victoria Spencer | |
| 1977 | The Island of Dr. Moreau | Maria | |
| 1980 | When Time Ran Out | Iolani | |
| 1981 | Condorman | Natalia Rambova | |
| 1982 | I, the Jury | Dr. Charlotte Bennett | |
| 1983 | Lone Wolf McQuade | Lola Richardson | |
| 1983 | Never Say Never Again | Fatima Blush | Nominated — Golden Globe Award for Best Supporting Actress – Motion Picture |
| 1985 | Wild Geese II | Kathy Lukas | |
| 1987 | Love at Stake | Faith Stewart | |
| 1987 | The Underachievers | Katherine | |
| 1989 | Loverboy | Alex Barnett | |
| 1989 | Wicked Stepmother | Priscilla | |
| 1993 | Point of Impact | Eva Largo | |
| 1994 | Tryst | Julia | |
| 1994 | Night of the Archer | Victoria de Fleury | |
| 1995 | Russian Roulette: Moscow 95 | Caroline White | |
| 1996 | Love Is All There Is | Maria Malacici | |
| 1998 | Waking Up Horton | Isadora | |
| 1999 | Alec to the Rescue | Madam Wong | |
| 2000 | Coo Coo Café | Lola | |
| 2002 | Panic | Bernadette | |
| 2005 | Twenty | Maria | Short film |

=== Television ===
| Year | Title | Role | Notes |
|---|---|---|---|
| 1978–1979 | Centennial | Clay Basket | Miniseries |
| 1981 | Masada | Sheva | Miniseries |
| 1982 | Matt Houston | Serena Gambacci | Episode: "X-22" |
| 1984 | Sins of the Past | Terry Halloran | Television film |
| 1985–1986 | Dallas | Angelica Nero | Special Guest Star, 25 episodes |
| 1987 | Mike Hammer | Claire Morgan | Episode: "Lady Killer" |
| 1988 | Emma: Queen of the South Seas | Emma Coe | Miniseries |
| 1990 | Murder in Paradise | Emma Danton | Television film |
| 1992 | Lakota Moon | Still Water | Television film |
| 1994 | Fortune Hunter | President Isabella Duarte | Episode: "Countdown" |
| 1995 | Sawbones | Rita Baldwin | Television film |
| 1996 | The Rockford Files: Godfather Knows Best | Elizabetta Fama | Television film |
| 1998 | JAG | Marcella Paretti | Episode: "Going After Francesca" |
| 1999 | Lakota Moon | Still Water | Television film |
| 2000 | That '70s Show | Barbara | Episode: "The First Time" |
| 2004 | Judging Amy | Francesca Messina | Episodes: "Baggage Claim" and "My Little Runaway" |
