= Eckhart Nickel =

German writer (born 1966)

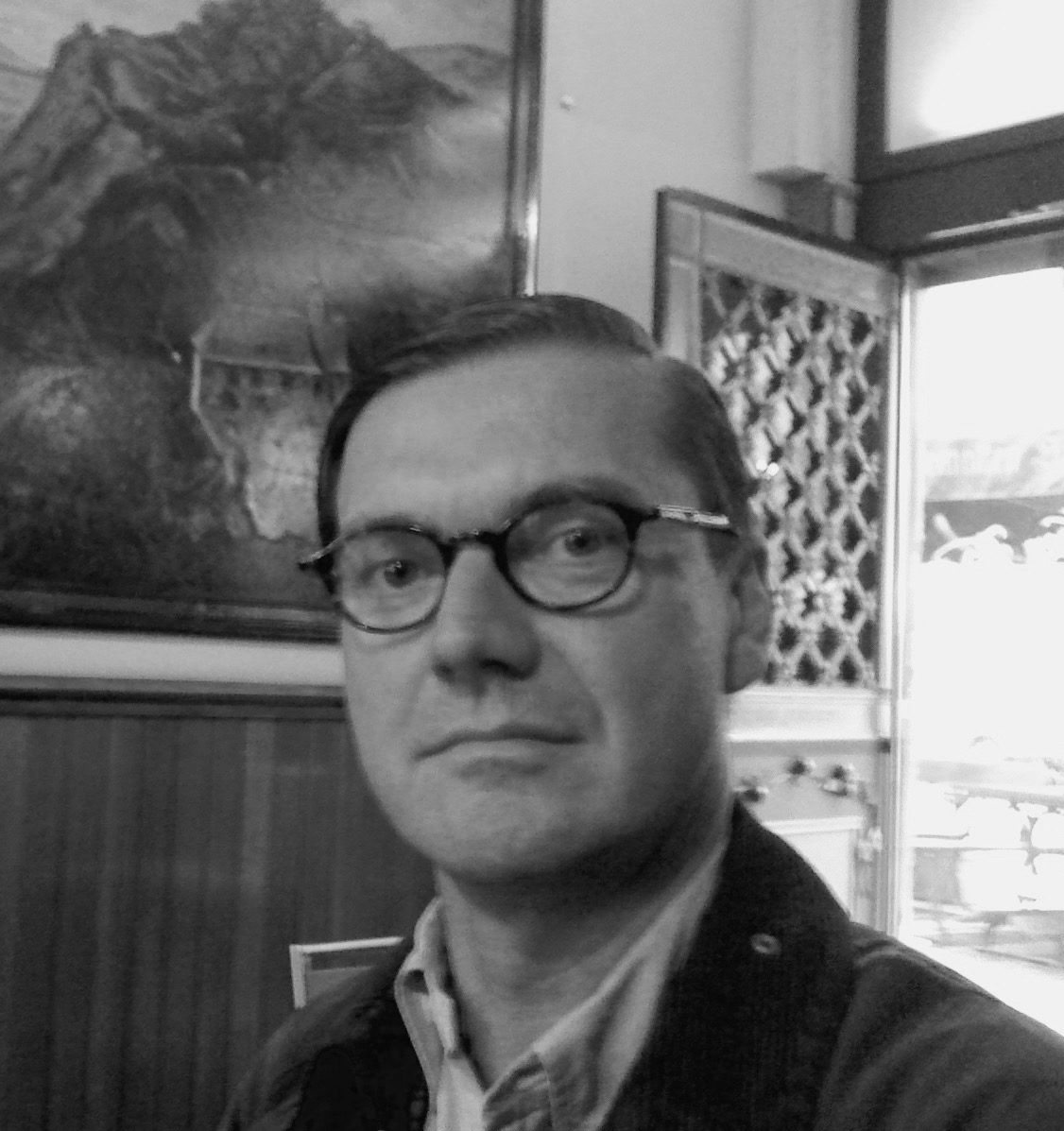
Eckhart Nickel in the restaurant "Zum Gemalten Haus" in Frankfurt.

Eckhart Nickel (born 1966) is a German author and journalist.

Nickel was born in Frankfurt am Main. After studying art history and literature in Heidelberg and New York City, he worked at various media outlets including the German lifestyle magazine Tempo, Arte television in Strasbourg, and Architectural Digest. His writings were published in the weekend editions of the Süddeutsche Zeitung and Frankfurter Allgemeine Zeitung. He co-wrote the 1998 travel book Ferien für immer with the Swiss writer Christian Kracht. He was also editor-in-chief of the acclaimed literary magazine Der Freund, a collaboration with Kracht (the magazine's publisher), which was created in Kathmandu and published from September 2004 to June 2006. From January to October 2007, he was in charge of lifestyle writing for the Saturday supplement of the Süddeutsche Zeitung. He is a resident of Sonoma County, California.

At the start of his career, Nickel was classified in the so-called "pop literature" genre of contemporary German writing; his works are chiefly concerned with the fate of modern man in a state of rebellion. Initially highly self-referential, one reviewer has noted a "more serious undertone" to his more recent works.
