= Christian Kracht =

Swiss novelist (born 1966)

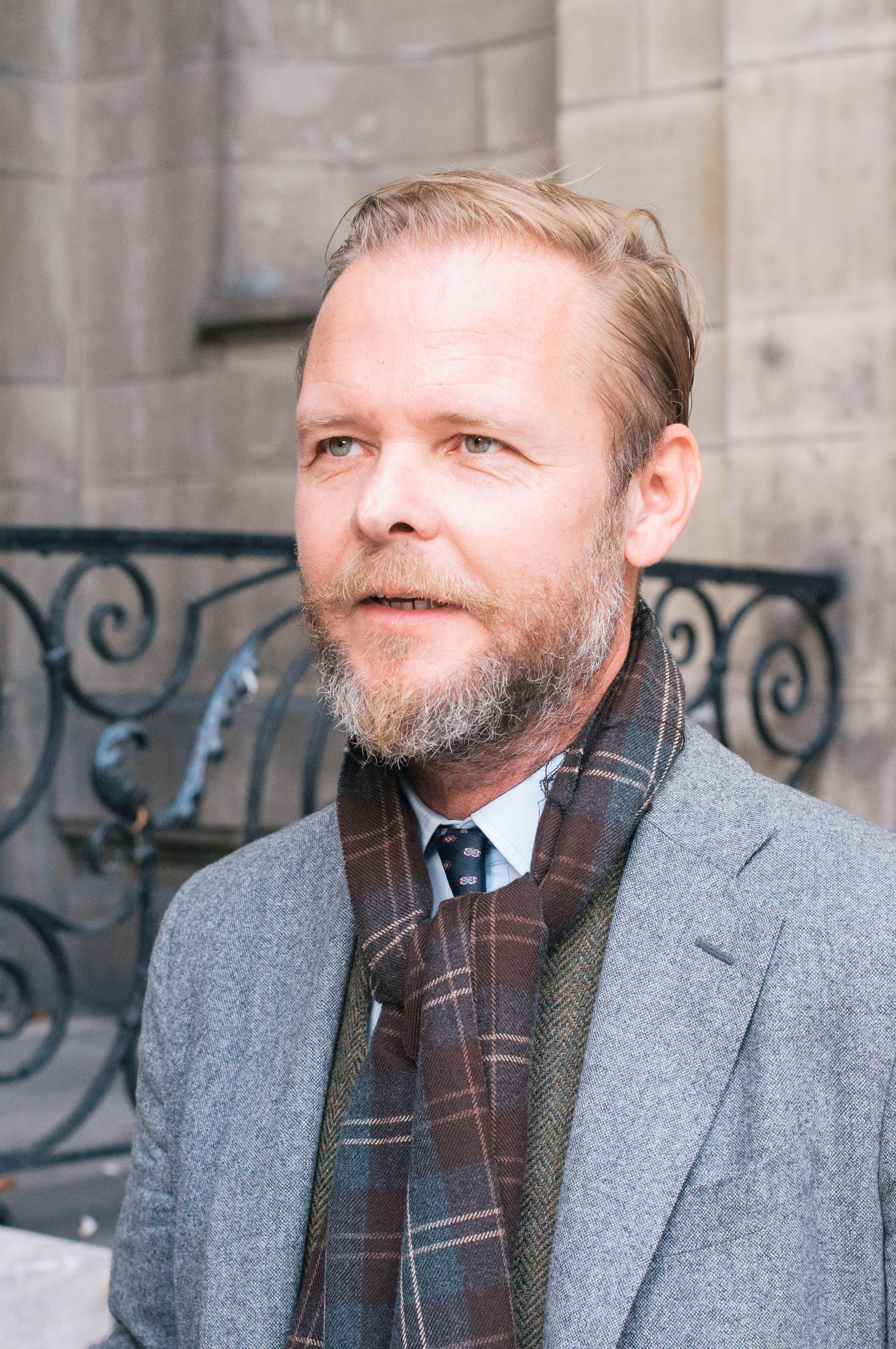
- Kracht in 2015
- Born: 29 December 1966 (age 59); Saanen, Switzerland
- Education: Sarah Lawrence College
- Occupation: Novelist
- Spouse: Frauke Finsterwalder
- Children: 1
- Writing career
- Movements: Postmodernism, German pop literature

Christian Kracht (German pronunciation: [ˈkraxt]; born 29 December 1966) is a Swiss author, journalist, and screenwriter.

His writing deals with key themes of popular culture and consumerism, and his novels often show disillusioned conclusions. His work has been subject to some critical controversy. His books have been translated into more than 30 languages.

== Early life ==
Kracht was born in Saanen in the Canton of Bern. Kracht's father, Christian Kracht Sr., was chief representative for the Axel Springer publishing company in the 1960s. Kracht attended Schule Schloss Salem in Baden-Württemberg, Germany and Lakefield College School in Ontario, Canada. He graduated from Sarah Lawrence College, New York, in 1989.

== Journalistic career ==
Kracht worked as a journalist for a number of magazines and newspapers in Germany, including Der Spiegel. In the mid-1990s, he lived and worked in New Delhi as Spiegel's Indian correspondent. Kracht then moved to Bangkok, from where he visited various other countries in South East Asia and authored travel vignettes which were serialised in the Welt am Sonntag newspaper, and in 2000, collated in the book Der gelbe Bleistift (The Yellow Pencil) . In November 2006, Kracht was a regular columnist for the newspaper Frankfurter Allgemeine Zeitung. His fortnightly column, which originally had the title Letter from..., later changed to Letter from the Past. He also traveled to and wrote pieces on the Panjshir Valley, Mogadishu, Mount Kilimanjaro and about the Safavid architecture of Imam Ali Shrine in Iraq.

In 1998, he worked with Eckhart Nickel to co-author Ferien für immer (A permanent vacation), collated musings on "the most pleasant places on earth". In 1999, Kracht took part in the performance piece Tristesse Royale with Benjamin von Stuckrad-Barre, Joachim Bessing, Eckhart Nickel, and Alexander, Count of Schönburg-Glauchau. The book is an edited transcript of a recording made by the contributors in which they discuss globalised popular culture while staying at Berlin's Hotel Adlon. For some commentators, this publication constituted the high-water mark of so-called Popliteratur – a literary marketing phenomenon for which Kracht was the supposed figurehead. The author has repeatedly distanced himself from this epithet and has, for example, refused permission for his work to be republished in an anthology of that genre. This notwithstanding, Kracht was the editor of the anthology Mesopotamia – a collection of short stories, fragments and photo montages by authors associated with the pop literature, including Rainald Goetz, Andreas Neumeister and Benjamin von Stuckrad-Barre. First published with the subtitle "Ernste Geschichten am Ende des Jahrtausends" ("Serious stories at the turn of the Millennium"), this subtitle was dropped in its 2001 republication by Deutsche Taschenbuch Verlag in favour of an "Avant-Pop-Reader." The relabeling notably coincided with the deflating currency of the term "pop literature" in the early years of the new century.

Between September 2004 and June 2006, Kracht published the independent literary magazine Der Freund in collaboration with Eckhart Nickel. He initially lived in Kathmandu while working as the magazine's editor before leaving Nepal during a period of political unrest. The chiefly German-language magazine was ultimately completed in San Francisco with a total of eight editions as originally planned. The magazine featured regular contributions from Hans-Ulrich Obrist and Ingo Niermann.

In February 2007, he published Metan (Methane) as the product of a climbing expedition on Kilimanjaro with Ingo Niermann. The book posits that the effects of methane gas on the Earth's atmosphere are part of a vast cosmic conspiracy. Early reviews varied from the critical to the bewildered, one describing it as "großer Quatsch" ("a load of nonsense"). Another reviewer refers to the book as a parody of "alarmism" and suggested it should be taken as a joke: "But if this book is taken as a joke, it probably is not a bad one".

In 2012, Kracht published an exchange of letters with David Woodard entitled Five Years. Although this text is essentially a performance piece, certain episodes in their correspondence were deemed controversial, especially references to Nueva Germania. In February 2012, Georg Diez opined in Der Spiegel that Five Years exposed racist, right-wing sympathies supposedly present in Kracht's latest novel Imperium. This view was widely contested by established critics and authors alike during a sustained literary debate in German-language newspapers and magazines.

== Personal life ==
Kracht is married to German film director Frauke Finsterwalder with whom he has a daughter who was born in 2009. They live in Zurich.

== Novels ==
The protagonists of Kracht's fiction embark on journeys that take them in search of an elusive moment of immersive, utopian experience or spiritual enlightenment often located in a different nation or culture. Their journey usually, but not always, results in disappointment, failure or even death. The theme of travel was introduced in Kracht's debut novel, Faserland (1995). While the first wave of the novel's criticism identified Faserland as a novel about the affirmation of brand names and consumer culture, a second wave of criticism suggested that the novels evinces the protagonist's dissatisfaction with his lifestyle and existential "ennui". Early criticism of the novel suggested the influence of Bret Easton Ellis on his work, with some commentators even accusing him of plagiarism. Since the critical re-evaluation of Faserland, however, critics have observed the potential influence on his work by younger German-language writers such as Leif Randt with his 2011 novel Schimmernder Dunst über Coby County (The glistening haze over Coby County).

The setting of Kracht's second novel 1979 is Iran. It begins in medias res against the backdrop of the revolution of the Ayatollah Khomeini during the titular year. This novel also deals with alienation and a chiefly Western form of consumer existence, but it depicts the fragility of an apparently decadent Western-metropolitan value system and its powerlessness before the Eastern-totalitarian models of Islam and Maoism. After the supposed frivolousness of Faserland, Kracht was now seen as on the way "towards genuine seriousness" in his writing, a view held by critics that was no doubt informed by the context of the September 11 attacks with which the novel's publication coincided. Kracht is skeptical about such a reading of his work and argues that he writes literary "light entertainment" and "comedies." Thus, during a television appearance on the popular Harald Schmidt show in 2001, Kracht argued that his book was essentially kitsch.

His 2008 novel Ich werde hier sein im Sonnenschein und im Schatten (I will be here in sunshine and in shadow) imagines an alternative history of the twentieth century in which Lenin never returned to Russia from Switzerland, but instead founded a Swiss Soviet Republic – a communist state engaged in the colonization of Africa and in perpetual war with other totalitarian empires, notably with a federation of British and German fascists. Channeling Philip K. Dick's The Man in the High Castle and Ford Coppola's Apocalypse Now, the plot of the novel traces a black Swiss political commissar's journey to the heart of the empire to arrest the rogue officer Brazhinsky in the Réduit. It quickly garnered acclaim in the German-speaking literary world. Broadsheet Die Welt called it a "glorious horror story." The Süddeutsche Zeitung praised the writing as not only deeply reminiscent of Ernst Jünger, but also as the "most beautiful German prose currently on offer." But the Frankfurter Rundschau reviewer discounted Ich werde hier sein as "simply moronic," and Die Tageszeitung found the text to be too diffuse and incoherent, amounting to just "drug-clouded scenery."

Kracht's 2012 novel Imperium follows on from Ich werde hier sein im Sonnenschein und im Schatten both in its critical reception and as a reimagining of history. In this sense, the novel bears some similarity to Die Vermessung der Welt (Measuring the World) by Daniel Kehlmann, an author with whom Kracht corresponded while composing Imperium. The novel follows the travails of the historical figure August Engelhardt in the Bismarck Archipelago (now Papua New Guinea) at the beginning of the twentieth century. Engelhardt is an idealistic German emigrant who establishes a plantation on an island and founds a colony of "cocovoress:" radical vegetarians nourished exclusively by coconuts. Engelhardt's history is interspersed with cameo appearances by other figures from German cultural history, such as Hermann Hesse, Thomas Mann and Franz Kafka. The first of Kracht's novels not to be narrated in the first-person, the omniscient narrator informs readers of the protagonist's thoughts and contextualizes Engelhardt's life within the broader scope of twentieth-century history. Imperium created a stir in Germany even before its publication; writing in Der Spiegel, critic Georg Diez suggested that the novel "above all shows the author's proximity to extreme right-wing ideas." The accusation of racism levelled at Kracht was repudiated by other figures in the literary industry, including publisher Helge Malchow and fellow authors such as Daniel Kehlmann, Feridun Zaimoğlu, Necla Kelek and Elfriede Jelinek. Reviews of Imperium in the German-language press praised the novel's language, and it has been favourably compared to Joseph Conrad's Heart of Darkness in terms of both theme and style. Imperium has been translated into over 25 different languages, including English.

== Reception ==
His work has appeared in The Paris Review and in Harper's Magazine.

Kracht's novels contain elements of pastiche; a playful blend of influences appropriated from areas of "high" and "low" culture. Thus, Kracht's writings contain alienating references to other works, including Thomas Mann's Magic Mountain, the subtly ironic travel journals of Robert Byron, and Hergé's The Adventures of Tintin series. Furthermore, the ligne claire drawing style is used for the illustrations (by Dominik Monheim) in the first edition of Ferien für immer (1998), as well as for Der gelbe Bleistift (by Hugo Pratt) and the original cover of Imperium. Many of Hugo Pratt's characters, in turn, make their appearance in Imperium.

Kracht has attested that a writer "always performs being a writer". His performance is persuasive and has successfully seduced reviewers into sometimes overlooking the distinction between the author and narrator to erroneously identify Kracht as the autobiographical protagonist of his debut novel Faserland. He has sometimes been a controversial figure in modern German-language literature. The meaning of his pronouncements in interviews is not always obvious; his description of the Taliban leader Mullah Omar (and by implication the Taliban itself) as "camp" should perhaps be taken with a pinch of salt; in this case, moral values take second place after media aesthetics. A similar principle applies to Kracht's foreword to the 2006 illustrated book Die totale Erinnerung (published with Feral House as The Ministry of Truth in the U.S.), in which Kim Jong-Il's North Korea is referred to as a gigantic simulation, whereas his apparent ignorance of actual suffering in North Korea upset some commentators.

== Stage adaptations and screenplays ==
Since 2004, a stage version of the novel 1979 directed by Matthias Hartmann has been performed in theatres in Zurich, Bochum and Hannover. In 2009, the play was shown at the Burgtheater in Vienna, while a stage version of Ich werde hier sein im Sonnenschein und im Schatten has been performed at theatres in Basel, Stuttgart and Berlin. In 2015, a dramatized version of Imperium premiered at Thalia Theater in Hamburg, Germany. A stage version of The Dead premiered in December 2017 at Bern Theatre in Switzerland's capital.

Kracht co-authored the screenplay for the 2013 film Finsterworld, which was directed by his wife Frauke Finsterwalder. The couple also co-wrote the screenplay for Finsterwalder's second feature film, Sisi & I, a biopic about Empress Elisabeth of Austria, premiered at the 73rd Berlin Film Festival on 19 February 2023.

Kracht's 2021 novel Eurotrash was adapted for the stage by Jan Bosse at Schaubühne, Berlin, premiering on 18 November 2021 where it has been running continuously. Different adaptations have been brought to the stage by Israeli director Itay Tiran at Burgtheater in Vienna, and by Austrian director Stefan Pucher at Thalia Theater (Hamburg). A Swedish version is currently playing at Stockholm's Teater Galeasen. An English language version is in production at the Young Vic Theatre in London, starring Kathryn Hunter and Ben Wishaw.

A film version of Eurotrash of the same title, directed by Finsterwalder, starring Barbara Sukowa, Alexander Fehling and Luna Wedler, which premiered at the Zurich Film Festival on 30 September 2026.

== Publications ==
=== Books ===
- Faserland (novel), 1995
- Ferien für immer (travel writing – with Eckhart Nickel), 1998
- Mesopotamia. Ein Avant-Pop-Reader (as publisher, anthology), 1999
- Tristesse Royale (with Joachim Bessing, Eckhart Nickel, Alexander von Schönburg and Benjamin von Stuckrad-Barre), 1999
- Der gelbe Bleistift (travel writing), 2000
- 1979 (novel), 2001
- Die totale Erinnerung. Kim Jong Ils Nordkorea, 2006. Released in English with Feral House as The Ministry of Truth. ISBN 978-1-932595-27-7
- New Wave. Ein Kompendium 1999–2006, 2006
- Metan (with Ingo Niermann), 2007
- Ich werde hier sein im Sonnenschein und im Schatten (novel), 2008
- Gebrauchsanweisung für Kathmandu und Nepal (travel writing/guide book to Nepal – with Eckhart Nickel), 2009
- Five Years: Briefwechsel 2004–2009. Band 1: 2004–2007 – with David Woodard, 2011, ISBN 978-3-86525-235-7
- Imperium (novel), 2012, ISBN 978-3-462-04131-6
- Finsterworld (screenplay), 2013
- The Dead (Die Toten) (novel), 2016
- Eurotrash (novel), 2021, ISBN 978-3-462-05083-7
- Air (novel), 2025, ISBN 978-3-462-00457-1

=== Audio books ===
- Liverecordings (with Benjamin von Stuckrad-Barre, Harald Schmidt and Christian Ulmen), 1999
- Faserland, 2000
- 1979, 2002
- Das Sobhraj Quartett – Asiatische Reisenotizen (with Eckhart Nickel), 2004
- Das Jagdgewehr ("The Hunting Gun") by Yasushi Inoue (with Sandra Schwittau, Mavie Hörbiger and Hannelore Elsner), 2005
- Frühstück bei Tiffany (Breakfast at Tiffany's) by Truman Capote, 2007
- Triptychon (with Dieter Meier, Schorsch Kamerun and Dirk von Lowtzow), 2011
- Imperium (with Dominik Graf), 2012
- Die Toten, 2016
- Eurotrash, 2021
- Air (with Mavie Hörbiger), 2025

== Distinctions ==
- 1993 – Axel Springer Prize for Young Journalists
- 2009 – Phantastik-Preis der Stadt Wetzlar
- 2012 – Literaturpreis des Kantons Bern
- 2012 – Wilhelm Raabe Literature Prize In the words of the awarding jury, Imperium "balances on the border between humour and horror ... with great confidence and so forms a significant twist in the tapestry of contemporary German-language literature".
- 2014 – The Extraordinary Book Award
- 2016 – Swiss Book Prize
- 2016 – Hermann-Hesse-Preis
- 2017 – nominated for the International Dublin Literary Award
- 2019 – nominated for the Prix Médicis
- 2021 – shortlisted for the German Book Prize
- 2021 – Swiss Literature Awards
- 2022 – Wolfgang Koeppen Prize
- 2025 – Eurotrash, translated by Daniel Bowles, longlisted for the International Booker Prize
