= Point of Impact (film) =

1993 film by Bob Misiorowski

- Directed by: Bob Misiorowski
- Starring: Michael Paré; Barbara Carrera; Michael Ironside
- Release date: 1993
- Country: United States

Point of Impact, also released as Spanish Rose, is a 1993 action film directed by Bob Misiorowski starring Michael Paré, Barbara Carrera and Michael Ironside. Paré plays a customs officer turned vigilante, and Carrera the wife of a Cuban mob boss, played by Ironside. Some scenes were filmed in KwaZulu-Natal in South Africa, in Durban and Umhlanga Rocks.

== Cast ==
- Michael Paré as Jack Davis
- Barbara Carrera as Eva Largo
- Michael Ironside as Roberto Largo
- Lehua Reid as Sandra Ficher
- Henry Cele as Titus
- Ian Yule as Martin Cullen
- Tony Caprari as Ricardo
