= Gerd Koenen =

German historian of the modern age

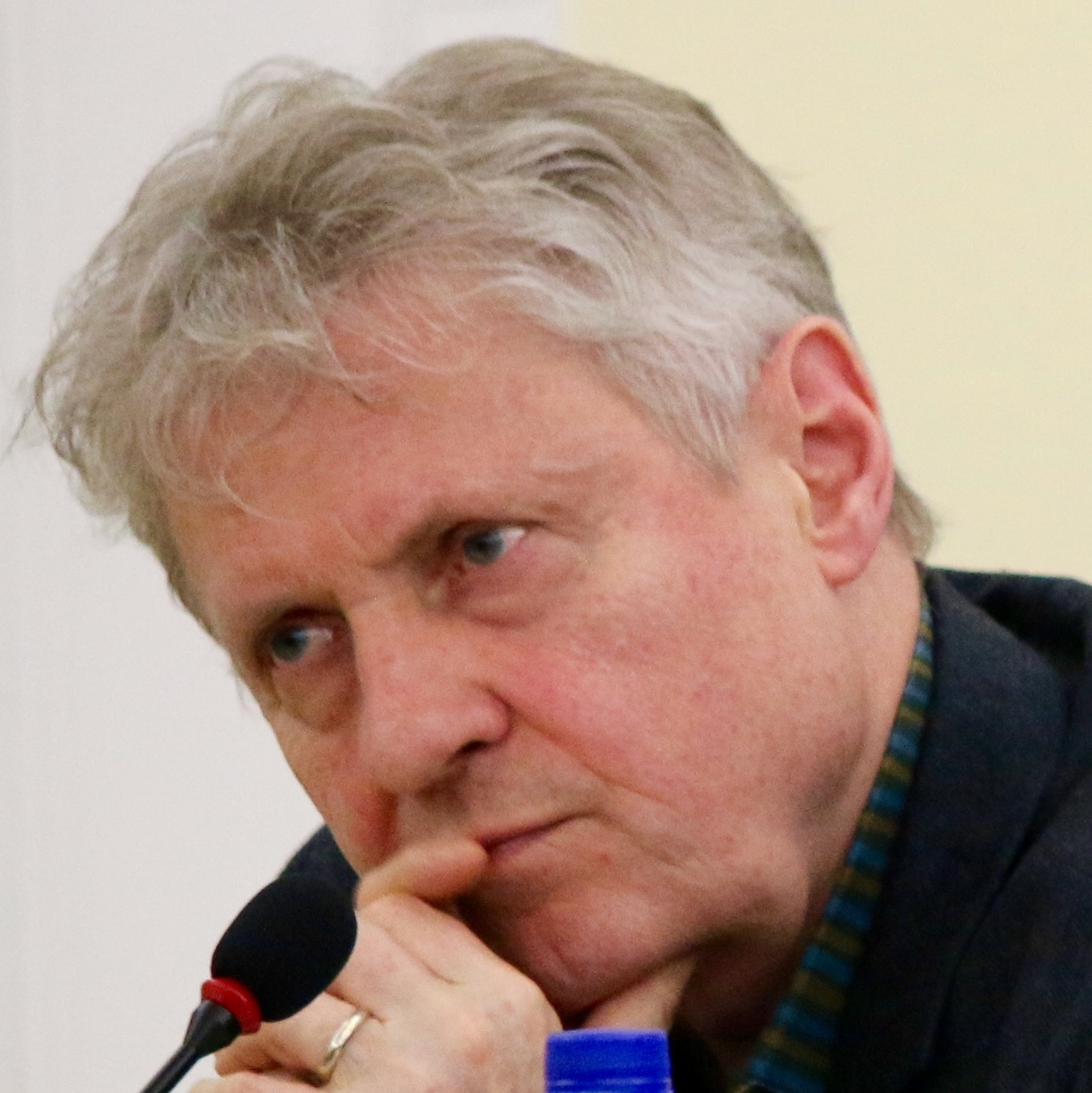
- Koenen in 2016
- Born: 9 December 1944 (age 81); Marburg, Germany
- Education: University of Tübingen
- Scientific career
- Fields: History of Eastern Europe, history of Communism

Gerd Koenen (born 9 December 1944) is a German historian and former communist politician.

== Life and work ==
Born in Marburg, Koenen grew up in Bochum and Gelsenkirchen and studied Romance languages, history and politics in Tübingen. There, he joined the Sozialistischer Deutscher Studentenbund (Socialist German Student Association) in the wake of the shooting of Benno Ohnesorg by the police. In 1968 he moved to Frankfurt, where in 1972, he completed the state exam in history and politics.

In 1973, he joined the newly founded Communist League of West Germany (KBW). Under the influence of his party he gave up his 1974 doctoral dissertation, preferring instead to devote himself to the "revolutionary factory work" and from 1976 to edit the Communist People's Daily of KBW. As of 1982, Koenen distanced himself from KBW and was disillusioned with his study of the Polish antisoviet movement Solidarity. A number of Koenen's publications are devoted to the history of communism and its perception in Germany, a subject on which he finally received his doctorate in Tübingen in 2003. From 1988 to 1990, he was editor of the magazine Pflasterstrand ("Paved Beach") along with Daniel Cohn-Bendit).

Koenen's 2001 book Das rote Jahrzehnt ("The Red Decade") became well-known and due to the discussion of the radical leftist past of foreign minister Joschka Fischer, and the importance of the '68 movement in the history of the Federal Republic.

Unlike some other intellectuals with communist pasts, Koenen so far has not absolutely condemned all left positions in a reversal of position. In a 2001 edition of the Joscha Schmierer-edited magazine Commune, Koenen inveighed against the "trial of the young seniors of the Free and Christian Democracy, a rhetoric of universal suspicion of their way of Resolute conformism as the only possible way of socialization ex post yet to establish".

Articles by Koenen also appeared in Der Spiegel, Die Zeit and many national newspapers. In addition, Koenen is author or co-author of several radio and television broadcasts.

Koenen got his doctorate in 2003 from the University of Tübingen with his thesis Rom oder Moskau – Deutschland, der Westen und die Revolutionierung Russlands 1914–1924 ("Rome or Moscow: Germany, the West and the revolutionization of Russia 1914–1924"). From 2008 to 2010, Koenen researched the history of communism at the Freiburg Institute for Advanced Studies, FRIAS.

== Books ==
- with Krisztina Koenen und Hermann Kuhn: Freiheit, Unabhängigkeit und Brot. Zur Geschichte und den Zielen der Arbeiterbewegung in Polen. Sendler, Frankfurt am Main 1981, ISBN 3-88048-050-8.
- with Barbara Büscher, Ruth-Ursel Henning, Dorota Leszczynska, Christian Semler, Reinhold Vetter: Solidarność. Die polnische Gewerkschaft ‚Solidarität‘ in Dokumenten, Diskussionen und Beiträgen. Bund-Verlag, Köln 1983, ISBN 3-7663-0815-7.
- Der unerklärte Frieden. Deutschland – Polen – Rußland. Eine Geschichte. Sendler, Frankfurt am Main 1985, ISBN 3-89354-017-2.
- Die großen Gesänge: Lenin – Stalin – Mao Tsetung. Führerkulte und Heldenmythen des 20. Jahrhunderts. Eichborn Verlag, Frankfurt am Main 1987 (2. Auflage 1991), ISBN 3-8218-1143-9.
- Unheilige Allianz. Rußland und Deutschland. Eine 400jährige Faszination in Freundschaft und Feindschaft. Eichborn Verlag, Frankfurt am Main 1990, ISBN 3-8218-1117-X.
- with Karla Hielscher: Die schwarze Front. Der neue Antisemitismus in der Sowjetunion. rororo, Reinbek bei Hamburg 1991, ISBN 3-499-12927-2.
- with Lew Kopelew (Hrsg.): Deutschland und die russische Revolution 1917–1924; West-östliche Spiegelungen Serie A, Bd. 5; Fink, München 1998, ISBN 3-7705-3184-1.
- Utopie der Säuberung. Was war der Kommunismus?. Alexander Fest Verlag, Berlin 1998, ISBN 3-8286-0058-1.
- Das rote Jahrzehnt. Unsere kleine deutsche Kulturrevolution 1967–1977. Kiepenheuer & Witsch, Köln 2001, ISBN 3-462-02985-1.
- Vesper, Ensslin, Baader. Urszenen des deutschen Terrorismus. Kiepenheuer & Witsch, Köln 2003, ISBN 3-462-03313-1.
- Der Russland-Komplex. Die Deutschen und der Osten 1900–1945. C.H. Beck, München 2005, ISBN 3-406-53512-7. (Leipziger Buchpreis zur Europäischen Verständigung 2007)
- Traumpfade der Weltrevolution. Das Guevara-Projekt. KiWi, Köln 2008, ISBN 978-3-462-04008-1.
- with Andres Veiel: 1968. Bildspur eines Jahres. Fackelträger, Köln 2008, ISBN 978-3-7716-4359-1.
- Was war der Kommunismus? Vandenhoeck & Ruprecht, Göttingen 2010, ISBN 978-3-525-32301-4 (FRIAS Rote Reihe, Band 2).
