= Necla Kelek =

Turco-German feminist and social scientist (born 1957)

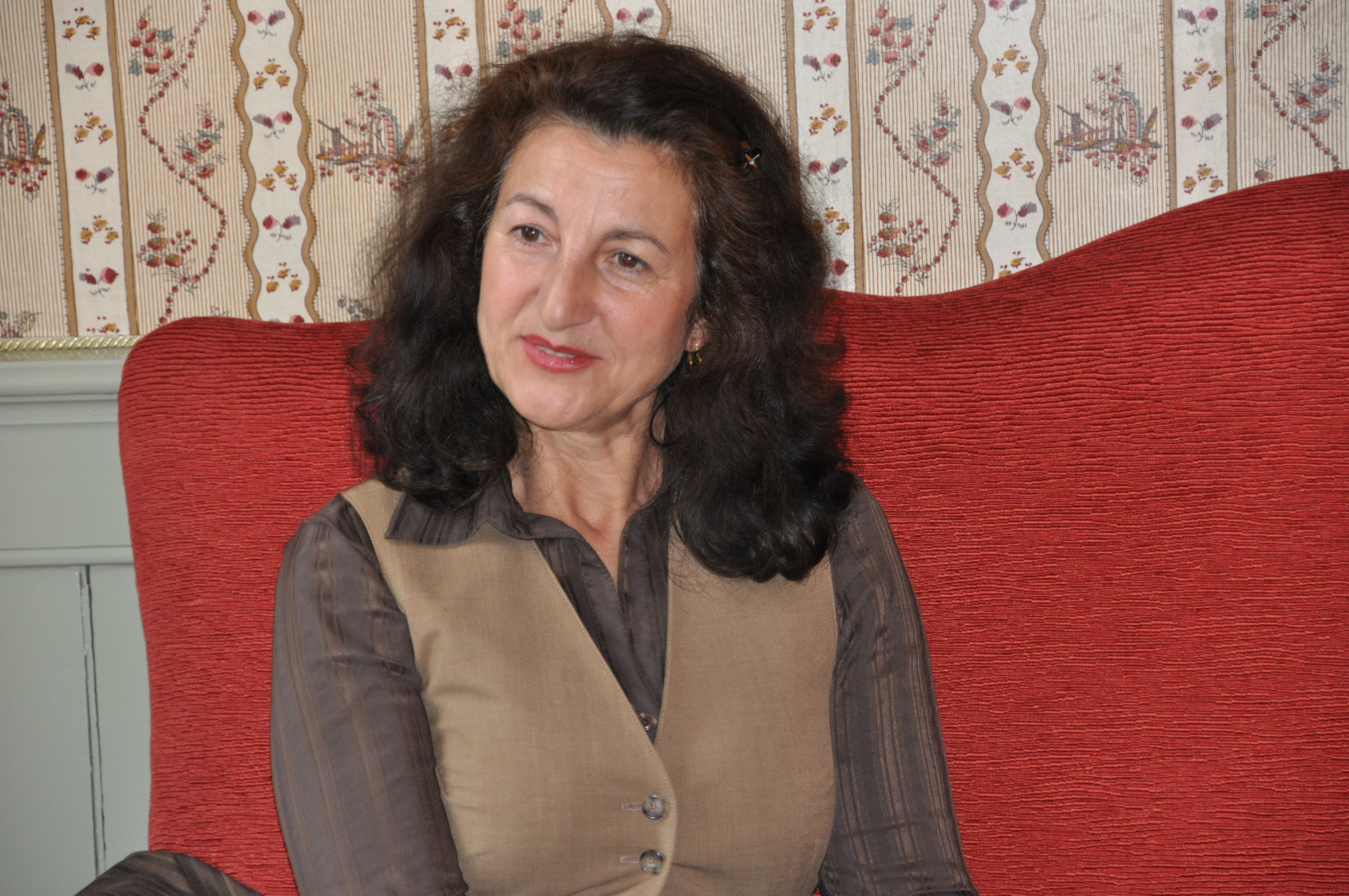
- Kelek in 2010
- Born: 31 December 1957 (age 68); Istanbul, Turkey

Necla Kelek (Turkish: [ˈnedʒɫa ˈkelek]; born 31 December 1957) is a Turkish-born German feminist and social scientist, holding a doctorate in this field, originally from Turkey. She gave lectures on migration sociology at the Evangelische Fachhochschule für Sozialpädagogik (Protestant Institute for Social Education) in Hamburg from 1999 until 2004.

== Life ==
The following section in based on Kelek's autobiography, which is part of her book, Die fremde Braut (The Foreign Bride).

Necla Kelek was born in Istanbul, and came with her parents to Germany at the age of 11 in 1968. After her parents had maintained a western, secular lifestyle in Istanbul, they turned toward religion in Germany. Once, when Kelek dared to contradict her father, he threatened to kill her with an axe. Her father forbade her to participate in school sports, in order to protect her virginity and to preserve the "honor" of the family.

Her two older siblings still obeyed the conservative views of their parents. As a youth, she, herself, fled into depression ("Hüzün"), and then tried open refusal by her efforts in secondary school and university. She alienated herself more and more from her father and her family, and finally left them entirely.

Necla Kelek was first trained as an engineering draftsman. Later, she studied economy and sociology in Hamburg. She worked in a Turkish travel bureau in Hamburg, and in an engineering office in Wiesbaden. She was disowned by her family, since they did not want to allow her the right to be independent. She got her doctoral degree in 2001, with an investigation into the coming of age of women in Islam.

Kelek's research subject is the parallel society characterized by Islam in Germany. In 2011, she said: "Being a Muslim is becoming a self-sufficient identity. And this identity consists only of being different — different from the Europeans, different from the Africans, different from the Indians. And this frightens me. [Others] do not state their difference in terms of an utter rejection of the society that hosts them, preparing to take over one day. I often hear those Muslim youngsters bragging that one day, this country will be theirs." She also criticizes those who see themselves as victims, saying: "Today, the Turks, or Muslims, are given full access to civil rights, to democracy and liberty — and they reject all that. They have access to good education, health care, social welfare, but they voluntarily choose to keep out, to stagnate in parallel worlds. [...] How can they still consider themselves as victims, as the Jews once were in reality?"

She rejects toleration of the repression of both girls and boys in Islamic families as a "misunderstood tolerance". She lives today with her partner.

Necla Kelek backed the misgivings of Ralph Giordano about building a mosque in Cologne-Ehrenfeld. She argued, among other things, that an Islam is practiced in Germany which has proven to be a hindrance for integration. "These mosques are nuclei of a counter-society. They teach the philosophy of another society and practice a life in the spirit of the sharia. Already, the children would learn the separation from the German society".

=== Involvement in human rights ===
Similar to Ayaan Hirsi Ali, Dutch politician of Somali origin, or the Egyptian feminist, Sérénade Chafik, Kelek opposes the repression of women in Islam. She is strongly criticized by Islamic organizations for this, especially since she is convinced that there is very little compatibility between Western and Islamic ideals.

The Turkish press, especially, attacks Kelek again and again: Feminists like Kelek, Seyran Ateş, Sonja Fatma Bläser, and Serap Çileli are accused of "exaggeration". Most women are supposedly not exposed to male control, and live in freedom. Until the middle of 2005, this was also the editorial guideline of the liberal-conservative daily paper, Hürriyet, which is very influential among the Turkish people living in Germany: According to a study of the Gesellschaft für Konsumforschung (Society for Consumer Research, GfK) from 2002, forty percent of them had read this paper in the past two weeks. On 22 May 2005, "Hürriyet" started a Germany-wide campaign "against domestic violence". The discussion events in the large German cities got a large response, although the feminists who had previously been attacked refused to participate.

Kelek was a member of the scientific advisory council of the Giordano Bruno Stiftung, a "foundation for the support of evolutionary humanism", until 16 May 2007.

=== Scientific and political advisory activities ===
Necla Kelek received her doctorate with an investigation of Islamische Religiosität und ihre Bedeutung in der Lebenswelt von Schülerinnen und Schülern türkischer Herkunft (Islamic religiosity and its importance in the lives of schoolchildren of Turkish background), which appeared as a book in 2002 under the title of Islam im Alltag (Islam in Everyday Life). At that time, she came to the conclusion that schoolchildren individually learn Islam, adapt it to their needs, and use it to form their identity. Their Islamic religiousness is not a hindrance to integration, but, rather, an example of cultural change.

Three years later, Kelek came to quite a different conclusions. In her 2005 book, Die fremde Braut, she mixed autobiography, life stories of Turkish women, and literary forms with results of scientific investigations. Now, her summary was that Turkish tradition and Islamic religiousness could very well be a hindrance for integration. According to her book, many of the young people born in Germany in the separation phase of their lives were married by their parents to a bride or a groom in their place of origin in Turkey, and then brought back to Germany. Thus, integration in Germany was intentionally made more difficult. Kelek showed this with the example of "Gelin", who was brought as a bride from Turkey for an arranged marriage and had no chance or prerequisites at all for integration into German society. To describe this phenomenon, Kelek used conversations with Turkish women she became acquainted with in mosques or privately in Germany.

Die fremde Braut became a best-seller, and was praised in general, even by the critics. The emotionality of the book was felt by the reviewers to be a strength, but there was also clear criticism of sweeping negative statements about the entire segment of the population consisting of Turkish Muslims. A typical example of a reviewer who mixed praise and criticism in this way is Alexandra Senfft in the Frankfurter Allgemeine Zeitung (FAZ) on 31 May 2005. Kelek received the famed Geschwister-Scholl-Preis for Die fremde Braut, a prize which is awarded to a current book that shows intellectual independence and supports civil freedom, moral, intellectual, and aesthetic courage, and that gives an important impulse to the present awareness of responsibility. The laudatory speech was given by Heribert Prantl, head of the domestic policy department of the Süddeutsche Zeitung and former state prosecutor.

Necla Kelek commonly gives interview and makes political statements in very emphatic, and often polemic, form. For instance, she pleaded in the Die Tageszeitung (taz) of 16 January 2006, for the controversial citizenship test of the state government of Baden-Württemberg, which she described as a "Pasha Test". This test caused quite a stir at the beginning of 2006, as it would require Muslims who wanted to be naturalized in the state of Baden-Württemberg to answer questions to check their loyalty to the constitution and their fundamental attitudes. Kelek also made evaluations like these: According to investigations of the Federal Family Ministry, at least every second Turkish woman is married in the way described. There should therefore be several thousand cases each year. These investigations allegedly referred to the study presented by Family Minister Renate Schmidt in 2004 concerning violence against women in Germany. But it did not cover Kelek's numerical evaluations.

Shortly before the appearance of Kelek's family sociology study in mid-March 2006, the weekly paper Die Zeit published, on 2 February 2006, an open letter against Kelek's position, described as a petition and signed by 60 scientists from the social sciences field in general and migration research in particular, on the integration policy of Germany. The authors were the Bremen professor for intercultural education, Yasemin Karakaşoğlu, and the Cologne psychologist and journalist, Mark Terkessidis. Kelek was given the opportunity to reply in the same edition of the newspaper. There was considerable media reaction. In the daily, conservative newspapers Frankfurter Allgemeine Zeitung and Die Welt, articles appeared which clearly took sides for Kelek's positions. The daily, left-wing newspaper Die Tageszeitung gave adjacent space to a sharp critic of Kelek and to Kelek herself.

Today, Kelek is in demand as an expert on the subject of Islamic culture in the Western world. In her publication, Die verlorenen Söhne (The Lost Sons, 2006), her central theme is the influence of Islam on the small family. The book is based on Kelek's research project on the subject of "parallel society" at the Evangelischen Fachhochschule für Sozialpädagogik in Hamburg. Here also, Kelek merges autobiographical details, observations, conversations with Turkish retirees, and the results of interviews with Turkish prison convicts. She counsels the Hamburg justice authorities on questions about the treatment of Turkish Muslim prisoners. In preparation for the Deutscher Evangelischer Kirchentag 2005 in Hannover, she was invited to participate in the project group. In addition, she counseled the Baden-Württemberg state government regarding their legislative initiative to make forced marriage a punishable offense. She is a permanent member in the Islamic Conference appointed by the German federal government, and a free-lance author for the women's magazine, "Emma", and many daily newspapers, among others.

Following a 2012 ruling in Cologne that circumcision of male children for religious purposes was an "act of grievous bodily harm", Kelek wrote: "The circumcision of Muslim boys is an equally repulsive archaic custom as female genital mutilation among little girls. It is an instrument of oppression, and should be ostracized." Since November 2017, she is official "ambassador" for the registered association intaktiv e. V., which is against circumcision of male children.

== Awards ==
- 2006: Mercator-Professorship Award of the Universität Duisburg-Essen
- 2006: Corine Literature Prize (non-fiction book prize) for Die verlorenen Söhne. Plädoyer für die Befreiung des türkisch-muslimischen Mannes (The lost sons. Plea for the liberation of the Turkish Muslim man)
- 2005: Geschwister-Scholl-Preis Speech by Heribert Prantl

== Publications ==
- 2011: The Freedom that I Mean... or The Heart – or Wurst – of the Matter, in: Robertson-von Trotha, Caroline Y. (ed.): Europe: Insights from the Outside (= Kulturwissenschaft interdisziplinär/Interdisciplinary Studies on Culture and Society, Vol. 5), Nomos Verlag, Baden-Baden, ISBN 978-3-8329-5583-0
- 2007: Türkische Karriere. Allein unter Männern. In Anatolien. (Turkish career. Alone among men. In Anatolia.) In: Ulrike Ackermann (Publ.): Welche Freiheit. Plädoyers für eine offene Gesellschaft. (Which freedom. Plea for an open society.) Matthes & Seitz, Berlin, ISBN 978-3-88221-885-5,(also online)
- 2007: Erziehungsauftrag und Integration: Eine Auseinandersetzung mit Integrationshemmnissen (Educational task and integration: a debate with integration impediments), in: Deutsche Jugend, Vol. 55, No. 2, 53 - 59.
- 2006: Die verlorenen Söhne. Plädoyer für die Befreiung des türkisch-muslimischen Mannes. (The lost sons. Plea for the liberation of the Turkish Muslim man) Kiepenheuer & Witsch, Cologne, ISBN 3-462-03686-6
  - Excerpts from the concluding chapter
- 2005: Die fremde Braut. Ein Bericht aus dem Inneren des türkischen Lebens in Deutschland. (The foreign bride. A report from the inside of Turkish life in Germany) Kiepenheuer & Witsch, Cologne, ISBN 3-462-03469-3
  - Discussion by Rupert Neudeck and by Otto Schily in the Spiegel, Critical review by Ismail Küpeli in analyse & kritik
- 2002: Islam im Alltag. Islamische Religiosität und ihre Bedeutung in der Lebenswelt von Schülerinnen und Schülern türkischer Herkunft. (Islam in everyday life. Islamic religiousness and its importance in the lives of schoolchildren of Turkish background) Waxmann, Münster, ISBN 3-8309-1169-6 (dissertation)

== Filmography ==
- 2006: Islam - zwischen Fundamentalismus und Reform. (Islam - between fundamentalism and reform.) SWR, "Literatur im Foyer" by Thea Dorn, Television discussion with Neclá Kelek, Nahed Selim and Ralph Ghadban, 58 min., first broadcast: 7 April 2006
- 2005: Verschleierte Unterdrückung? Die Frauen und der Islam. (Veiled repression? Women and Islam.) SWR, Television discussion with Necla Kelek and Seyran Ateş, 44 min., first broadcast: 8 March 2005
