= Faserland =

1995 novel by Christian Kracht

- Author: Christian Kracht
- Original title: Faserland
- Language: German
- Genre: Pop literature
- Published: 1995
- Publication place: Germany, Switzerland
- Pages: 165
- ISBN: 3462024078
- OCLC: 33834433
- Followed by: 1979

Faserland is the debut novel by Christian Kracht, published in 1995. It is considered to have triggered the new wave of German pop literature. It is the swan song of the generation of the 80s, whose characteristics are so carefully described in the book that it has been called the "cult novel of a generation". Critics often compare the book to those of the American author Bret Easton Ellis.

Faserland has been translated into Russian, Czech, Latvian, Japanese, Lithuanian, Korean, Romanian, French, Ukrainian, Swedish, Norwegian and Hebrew. An autofictional sequel, Eurotrash, was published in 2021.

== Title ==
The title allows many different interpretations. Directly translated, it means "land of fibers" a possible reference to the narrator's recurring fixation on clothing, in particular his Barbour jacket. Another meaning that could be read into the title is the verb zerfasern ("to fray"), such as referring to the fraying of society.

When spoken with a German accent, it also sounds similar to the English word "Fatherland", which translates directly to Vaterland in German.

== Plot ==
The picaresque novel tells the story of a journey. The unnamed narrator is in his late twenties and is the son of a wealthy family, and travels south from the northernmost tip of Germany down to the Bodensee and onwards to Zürich. He is more an involuntary observer than participant in the events that unfold. He begins in Sylt and heads through Hamburg, Frankfurt, Heidelberg, Munich, Meersburg, and finally Zürich. In each of these places he has experiences with decadent excesses in the form of alcohol, drugs, and sexual encounters. These excesses are not enjoyed by the participants, but are more an expression of their hopelessness. The protagonist sees the downfall of his generation – a close friend commits suicide – and experiences his own downfall. He also reflects on unhappy memories of youth.

His odyssey, which can be interpreted as either a search for meaning or a long goodbye, ends on Lake Zürich: the references to Greek mythology (Charon, Obolus, and Hades) suggest the narrator's suicide in the middle of the lake. Another interpretation sees the crossing to the other shore as a sign of the homosexuality of the narrator. Neither has been confirmed by Kracht. The ending is left open.
