= 1979 (novel) =

German novel by Christian Kracht

- First edition cover
- Author: Christian Kracht
- Language: German
- Publisher: Kiepenheuer & Witsch
- Publication date: 24 September 2001
- Publication place: Switzerland
- Pages: 192
- ISBN: 978-3-462-03024-2

1979 is a 2001 novel by the Swiss writer Christian Kracht. It is set in 1979 and tells the story of an aloof homosexual who gets caught up in political turmoil in Iran and China.

== Plot ==
The protagonist is a homosexual young man who travels to Tehran with his ex-boyfriend Christopher. It is the time of the Iranian Revolution, and as Christopher dies during a drug binge, the full revolution breaks out. The protagonist is convinced to travel to Tibet to climb the sacred Mount Kailash, only to be captured by the Chinese army. He spends time in an internment camp where he is indoctrinated and goes along with the survival techniques the prisoners develop. Throughout the story, the man is largely unaffected by the events around him and pays more attention to art, music, food and furnishings.

== Publication ==
The book was published by Kiepenheuer & Witsch on 24 September 2001. The original German cover was designed by Peter Saville, known for his record sleeves for artists associated with Factory Records.

The novel has been translated into Bulgarian, Danish, Dutch, Estonian, French, Hebrew, Italian, Latvian, Lithuanian, Norwegian, Persian, Romanian, Russian, Spanish and Swedish.

== Reception ==
Elke Heidenreich of Der Spiegel wrote: "It is a laconic novel about the lack of sense, of global ideas, it is the likewise laconic statement that you can do anything to a man, even subdue him to inhuman totalitarianism, because he has no capability for resistance whatsoever." The critic continued: "1979 is a novel about decadence — the decadence of western consumption and eastern doctrines of salvation, the decadence of prison camps and the decadence of drug parties, 'and suddenly, at once, I saw myself in my full disgracefulness'."

== Adaptation ==
A stage version of the novel directed by Matthias Hartmann premiered in 2004 and was performed in theatres in Zurich, Bochum, Hannover and Vienna.
