= Benjamin von Stuckrad-Barre =

German writer and journalist (born 1975)

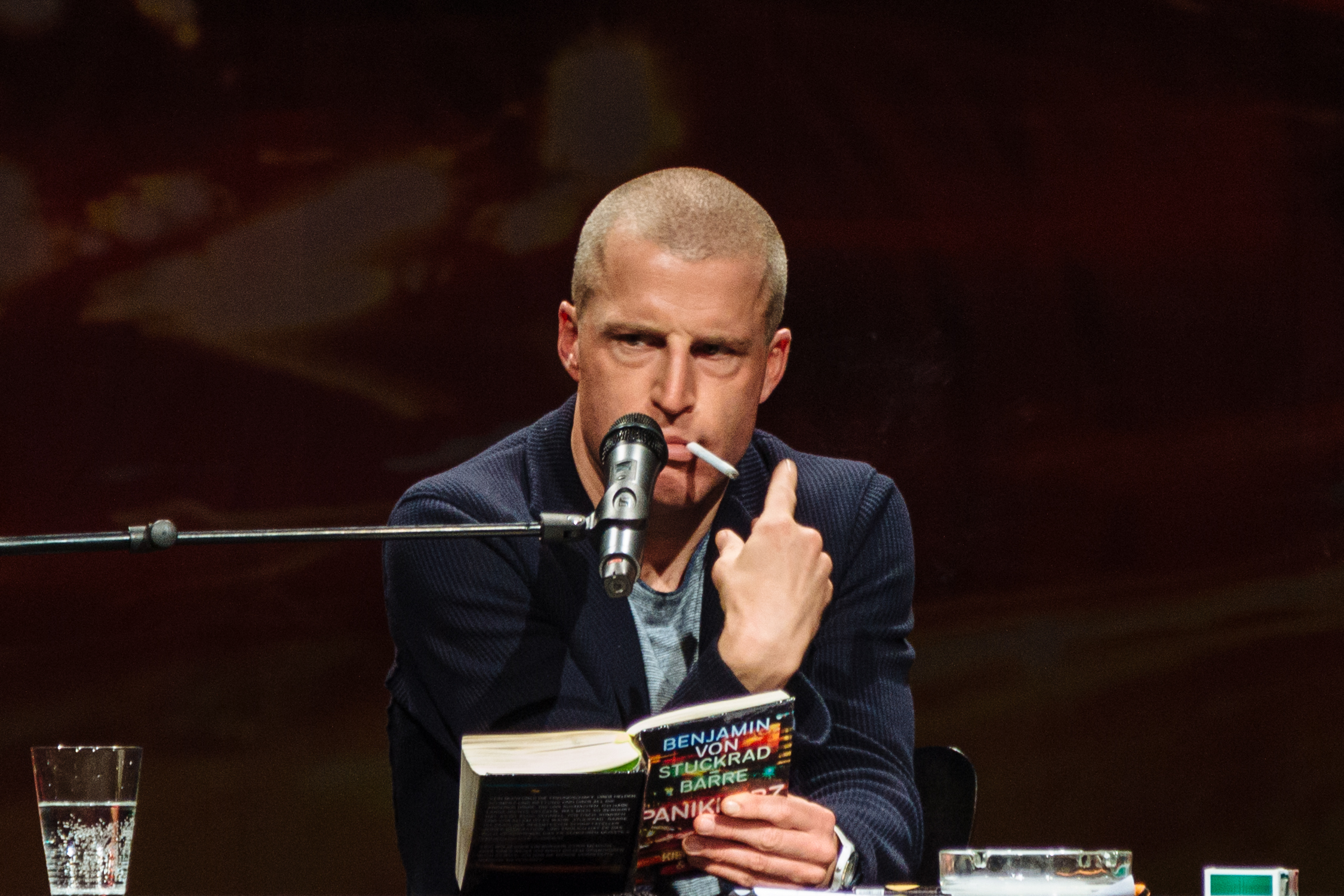
- Stuckrad-Barre in 2016
- Born: 27 January 1975 (age 51) Bremen, West Germany
- Occupation: Writer and journalist
- Literary movement: Pop literature

Benjamin von Stuckrad-Barre (born 27 January 1975) is a German writer, journalist and television presenter.

== Life and career ==
Benjamin von Stuckrad-Barre was born in Bremen on 27 January 1975. He is the son of a pastor and belongs to the noble family Stuckrad. He grew up in Rotenburg an der Wümme and Göttingen and briefly studied German studies in Hamburg.

Starting as a journalist in the 1990s, Stuckrad-Barre came to wider notice in 1998 with the publication of his debut novel Soloalbum, which became one of the main works of the pop literature movement and was adapted into a 2003 film.

He presented his own late-night chat show from 2010 to 2013. It ran on ZDFneo under the name Stuckrad Late Night before it moved to Tele 5 in 2012 and was renamed Stuckrad-Barre. In 2014 he made Stuckrads Homestory for Rundfunk Berlin-Brandenburg, a chat show where he did not know in advance who the guest would be, filmed at various locations relevant for the guests.

Stuckrad-Barre was married to the journalist Inga Grömminger. They became parents in 2012 and are now divorced.

In the autobiographical novel Panikherz from 2016, Stuckrad-Barre tells how his early success was followed by a destructive lifestyle with drug abuse, which he received help to overcome from the singer Udo Lindenberg.

His 2023 novel Noch wach? is set in the media world and revolves around an abusive television executive. The book was edited by a lawyer before publication and became a bestseller.

== Selected publications ==
- Soloalbum (1998)
- Panikherz (2016)
- Noch wach? (2023)
