= Ministry of Love (disambiguation) =

The Ministry of Love is one of the ministries in George Orwell's novel Nineteen Eighty-Four.

Ministry of Love may also refer to:

- Ministry of Love (album) by Io Echo
- Ministry of Love (film), Croatian film
