= The Ministry of Truth (Kracht book) =

2006 book by Christian Kracht

The Ministry of Truth: Kim Jong-Il's North Korea
- Author: Christian Kracht
- Original title: Die totale Erinnerung. Kim Jong Ils Nordkorea
- Language: German
- Subject: North Korea
- Genre: Non-fiction
- Publication date: 2006
- English publication date: 2007

The Ministry of Truth: Kim Jong-Il's North Korea (German: Die totale Erinnerung. Kim Jong Ils Nordkorea) is a 2006 book by the Swiss writer Christian Kracht and the photographers Eva Munz and Lukas Nikol. It consists of photographs from North Korea's capital Pyongyang accompanied by quotations from Kim Jong Il's book on film theory, On the Art of the Cinema. In his introduction, Kracht compares the country of North Korea to a film set where the government directs a simulation of a thriving nation. The book was published in English on 1 October 2007 through Feral House. The title is a reference to George Orwell's Ministries of Nineteen Eighty-Four.

== Reception ==
Publishers Weekly wrote that "the rich, full-color images of North Korea's capital city Pyongyang captured by international photographers Munz and Nikol contain a surreal beauty, often monumental and sparsely populated, that inspires a vivid sense of isolation and uncertainty. ... This slim book provides rare glimpses into the 'world's first postmodern country,' each as illuminating for what it shows as for what it hides."
