= Eurotrash (film) =

2026 film by Frauke Finsterwalder

- Theatrical release poster
- Directed by: Frauke Finsterwalder
- Written by: Frauke Finsterwalder; Christian Kracht
- Based on: Eurotrash (novel) by Christian Kracht
- Produced by: Tobias Walker; Philipp Worm
- Starring: Barbara Sukowa; Alexander Fehling
- Cinematography: Thomas W. Kiennast
- Edited by: Gesa Jäger
- Music by: Anna Drubich
- Production companies: Walker + Worm Film; C-Films AG; Dor Film Produktionsgesellschaft
- Distributed by: DCM Film Distribution
- Release dates: 15 September 2026 (Filmkunstmesse Leipzig); 24 December 2026 (Theatres)
- Running time: 100 minutes
- Countries: Germany; Switzerland; Austria
- Language: German

Eurotrash is a 2026 road movie directed by Frauke Finsterwalder, who co-wrote the screenplay with Christian Kracht based on his novel of the same name. The film, an international co-production between Germany, Switzerland and Austria, stars Barbara Sukowa and Alexander Fehling as mother and son, and Swiss actress Luna Wedler as their ubiquitous taxi driver.

It premiered at the Zurich Film Festival on 30 September 2026. It will be released theatrically in Germany, Austria and Switzerland by DCM on 24 December 2026.

== Synopsis ==
Middle-aged and jaded writer Philip comes to realise that he and his wealthy family have lived in a selfish, terrible way. Shocked by this, he goes on a strange, dream-like road trip across Switzerland with his terminally ill and constantly drunk mother, Helene, and her driver. They retrieve a plastic bag of cash from her Swiss bank account and try to give it all away to random strangers, and on the road they meet odd people, witness moments that feel magical, and slowly rebuild their broken relationship.

== Cast ==
- Barbara Sukowa as Helene
- Alexander Fehling as Philipp
- Luna Wedler as Liliyel
- Stefan Kurt as Guido
- Michael Maertens as Dirk

== Production ==
The project was supported by FilmFernsehFonds Bayern, MOIN FF, BKM, DFFF, BAK, Zürcher Filmstiftung, FISS, Suissimage, and Eurimages. Eurimages supported with €350,000 in November 2024.

Principal photography started on 14 April 2026 and wrapped on 5 June 2025 on location in Bavaria, in Hamburg, in the canton of Valais, in Zurich, and in Kenya.

== Release ==
First industry showing of Eurotrash was at the Filmkunstmesse Leipzig on 15 September 2026. Subsequently, it had its world premiere in 'Gala Premieres' section of the Zurich Film Festival on 30 September 2026. It was presented in the 'Great Freedom' section of Filmfest Hamburg on 1 October 2026,

The film competed at the 21st Rome Film Festival in 'Progressive Cinema Competition - Visions for the World of Tomorrow' in October 2026.

== Accolades ==
| Award | Date of ceremony | Category | Recipient(s) | Result | Ref. |
|---|---|---|---|---|---|
| Rome Film Festival | 25 October 2026 | Best Film | Eurotrash | Pending | |
