= Emma: Queen of the South Seas =

- Genre: Miniseries
- Directed by: John Banas
- Starring: Barbara Carrera; Steve Bisley; Thaao Penghlis; Hal Holbrook
- Country of origin: Australia
- Original language: English
- No. of episodes: 4

Production
- Executive producers: Antony I. Ginnane; Rob Chapman
- Producers: Ann Chapman; Ross Matthews
- Running time: 60 mins

Original release
- Network: Network 10
- Release: 14 November 1988 – 1988

Emma: Queen of the South Seas is a 1988 Australian miniseries based on the life of Emma Forsayth.

The budget was $5.5 million.

== Cast ==
- Barbara Carrera as Emma
- Steve Bisley as Tom Farrell
- Thaao Penghlis as Albert Steinberger
- Hal Holbrook as John Coe
- Barry Quin as The Hon. W. H. Lyttelton
- Ron Haddrick as Reverend Brown
- Gerard Kennedy as Captain Rabardy
- E. G. Marshall as President Grant
- Kate Sheil as Gwen Purdam
- Robert Mammone as John Coe, age 20
- Rebecca Rigg as Phoebe Coe Parkinson
- Rebekah Elmaloglou as Young Emma
- Michael Long as Captain Stephens
- Bob Baines as Mr Keegan
- Anna Maria Monticelli as Princess Le'utu
