= Matthias Hartmann (director) =

German theatre director (born 1963)

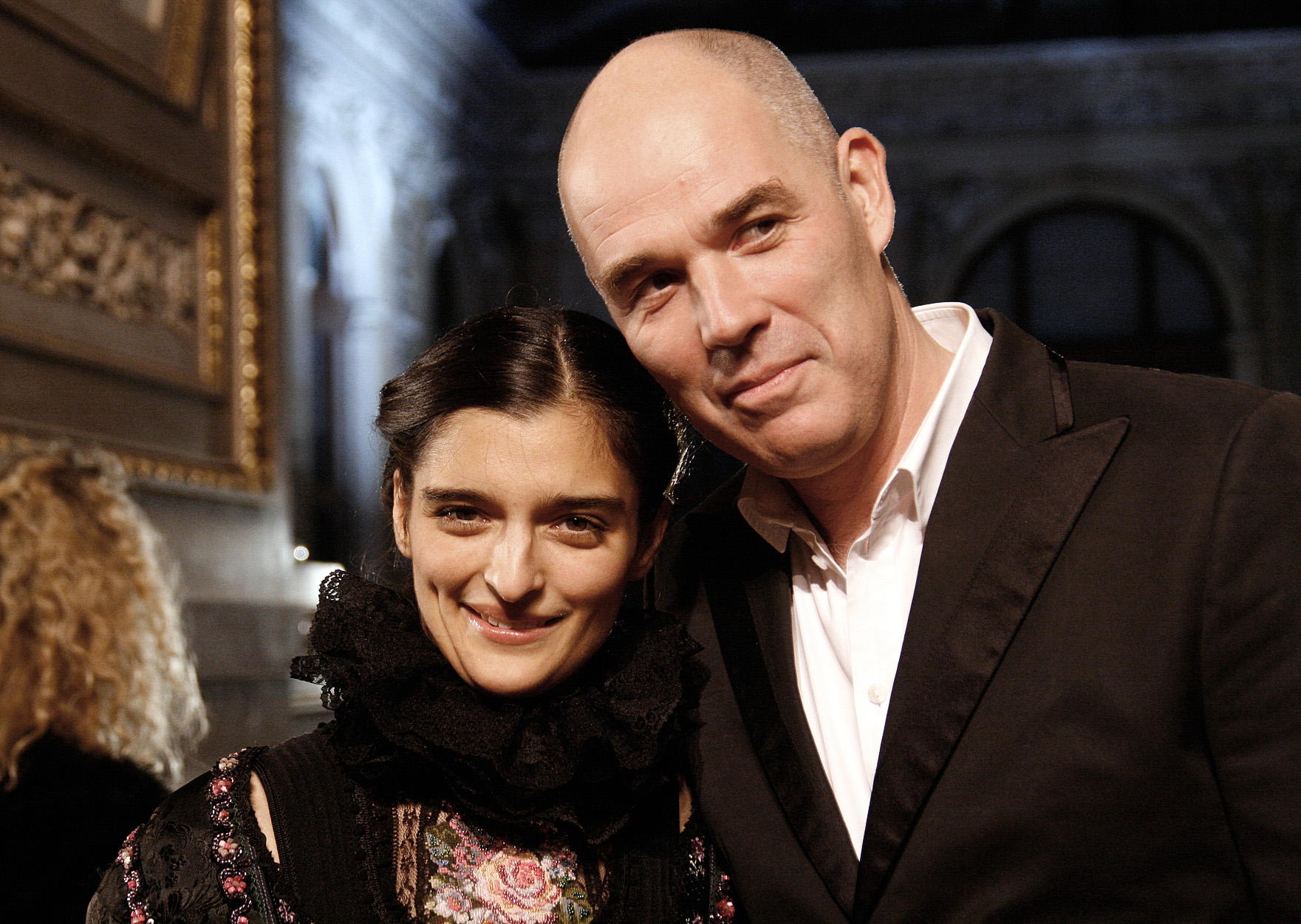
Hartmann with Alexandra Liedtke in 2010

Matthias Hartmann (born 27 June 1963) is a German theatre director and manager. He was born in Osnabrück and began as an assistant director in 1985, before he directed his first own production in 1989. He was managing director (Intendant) of the Schauspiel Bochum in 2000–2005, Schauspielhaus Zürich in 2005–2009 and Vienna's Burgtheater in 2009–2014. He left the Burgtheater amid a scandal about irregularities in the accounting.
