= August Engelhardt =

German author (1875–1919)

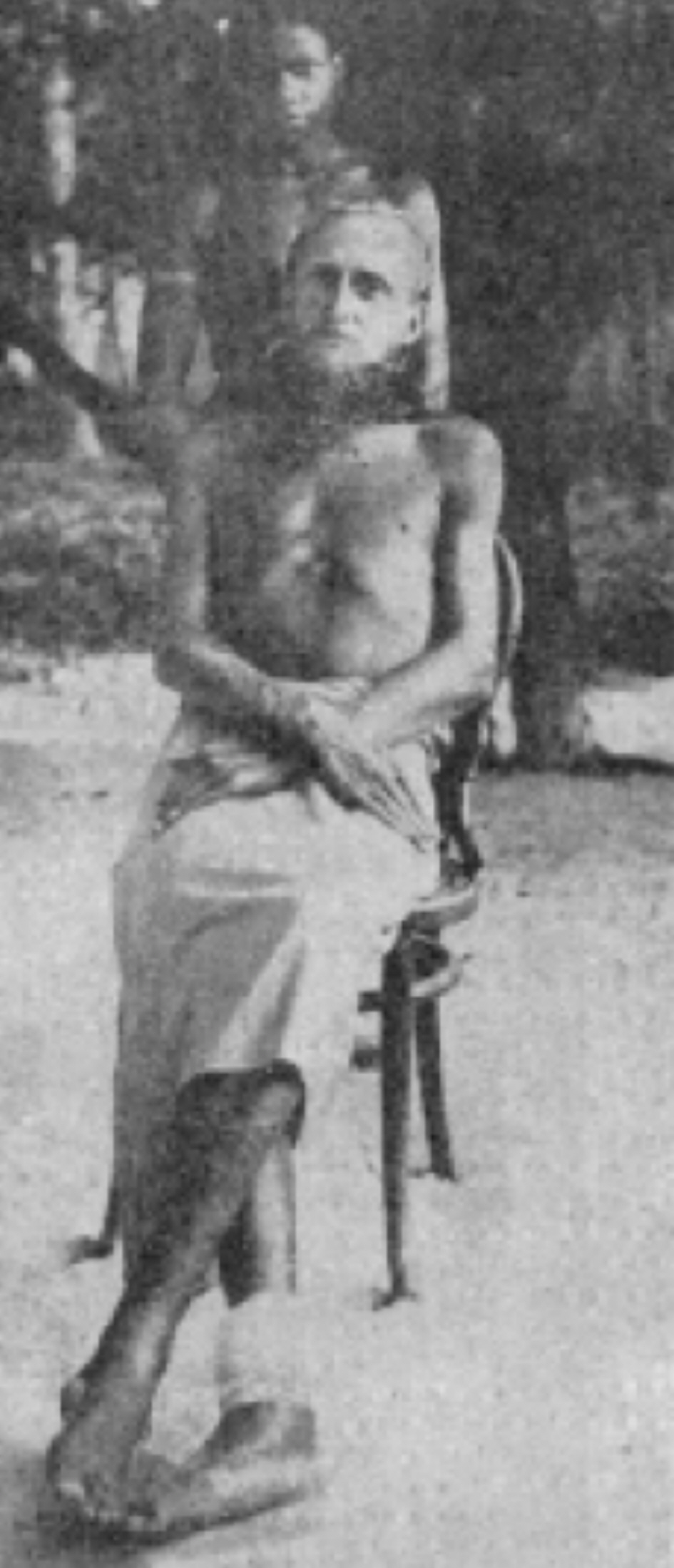
- Engelhardt in 1911
- Born: 27 November 1875; Nuremberg, German Empire
- Died: 6 May 1919 (aged 43); Kabakon, German New Guinea
- Scientific career
- Fields: Cocoivorism, Sun Worship

August Engelhardt (27 November 1875 – 6 May 1919) was a German author. He promoted fruitarianism, specifically the consumption of coconuts and coconut products, and was the founder of a sect of sun worshipers.

== Background ==
Engelhardt wrote a book called A Carefree Future (Eine Sorgenfreie Zukunft) in 1898, which described a colony of fruit and vegetable eaters, specifically cocoivores (coconut eaters), he was founding in the then-German (now Papua New Guinean) Bismarck Archipelago in the South Pacific, a place known for its headhunters. After graduating from Erlangen University in physics and chemistry, he conducted an 18-year experiment on Kabakon island, living a natural life on coconuts. However, in the writings of Engelhardt's contemporary Arnold Ehret, a pioneer of vitalism, the lack of transition diet contributed to his weakened vitality.

== Life ==
=== Early life ===
Engelhardt was born on 27 November 1877 in Nuremberg, the second son of Friedrich Carl Otto Engelhardt and Charlotte Maria Wilhelmina Engelhardt. August was the middle child of the four children born to the couple. Engelhardt's older sister and brother were named Julia and Friedrich (Fritz) and a younger sister Klara. Engelhardt's parents were first cousins. Through his paternal grandmother Engelhardt was the grand-nephew of the theologian and preacher Christoph Friedrich von Ammon.

Engelhardt's father was the owner of a factory located in Maxfeld that manufactured paints and varnish. Later in life Engelhardt would describe his childhood as being deeply unhappy and of being subjected from physical abuse from his parents. In 1894 when Engelhardt was just a teenager his mother died, this was followed in 1896 by the death of his father.

Engelhardt had studied at the Königliche Bayerischen Studienanstalt but Engelhard left the gymnasium (i.e., preparatory high school) to study physics and chemistry at Erlangen University, before working as a pharmacy assistant. From this he developed an interest in health, issues that were being promoted by the lifestyle reform movement, which included writers such as Gustav Schlickeysen, author of Obst und Brod: eine wissenschaftliche Diätetik (Fruit And Bread: A Scientific Diet) in 1877. The book proposed that a frugivorous diet was the rational and natural diet for man. In particular, he heard of a new philosophy developing in the United States called cocoivorism.

In the fall of 1899, Engelhardt joined the Jungborn ("Fountain of Youth") in the Harz mountains, Eckental, an association for wild living, which was founded by brothers Adolf Just and Rudolf Just and whose basic principles were vegetarianism and nudism. There he preached his idea that humans might live best in a "natural state" eating only coconuts, and gave public lectures in Leipzig and Nuremberg, where he was ridiculed. The Jungborn later experienced legal complications that led to its dissolution, as the practice of nudism was considered illegal and immoral. Adolf Just was convicted of improper activities as a naturopath and sent to jail. It is likely that these events led Engelhardt to a place away from the constraints and conventions of Europe where he could realize his ideas of natural living. Engelhardt was also part of the Monte Verità movement.

== Pacific islands ==
After serving for one year in the 14th Infantry Regiment, with a substantial inheritance, the 26-year-old took a trip on board the mail steamer Empire in July 1902. On 15 September 1902, Engelhardt arrived in German New Guinea in the West Pacific via Ceylon. There he hoped to find the conditions that he had envisaged to conduct a coconut eating and tropical living experiment. He obtained on 2 October 1902, from Queen Emma Kolbe's Forsayth Company, a coconut and banana plantation of 75 hectares on the coral island of Kaka Kon (Kabakon) for 41,000 marks. Kabakon was in Neu-Lauenburg (the Duke of York Islands in the Bismarck Archipelago, now part of Papua New Guinea) and 28 miles from Herbertshöhe (today Kokopo), where the German New Guinea imperial administration was based at that time. The other 50 hectares were a protected nature reservation inhabited by natives.

On Kabakon, as the only white man among 40 Melanesians, he built a three-room hut and began implementing his ideas of living close to nature. He gave up clothes completely and fed exclusively on a vegetarian diet, mostly from coconuts. He developed a philosophy that assumed that the sun was the venerable source of all life, and since the coconut was the fruit that grows nearest the sun, it must be the most perfect food for people. This view, called cocoivorism, culminated in Engelhardt's statement that the constant consumption of coconuts leads man to immortality. Engelhardt also made a living trading in coconuts, dried coconut, and coconut oil. After developing an ulcer on his right leg, he adopted a coconut monodiet, blaming tropical fruits for his condition.

According to a New York Times article from 15 October 1905: "His plan was to have his sect worship the sun. He held that man was a tropical animal, not intended to live in caves called houses, but to wander, as Adam did, with the sun beating upon him all day and the dews of heaven for a mantle at night. Living such a life, he believed that the healing and curative powers of the sun would in time render a man so immune that sickness could be overcome". The further Engelhardt's philosophy developed, the more dramatic was his testimony. He claimed that the noblest organ of the human body was the brain, because it is nearest to the sun, and he denied that such a noble part of the body receives its strength from the deep and dirty digestive tract. He suggested instead that the brain receives its energy from the hair roots, which in turn are fed by sunlight.

== Rise and fall of the coconut cult ==
Although he had brought 1200 books with him, Engelhardt felt isolated and wanted a community of like-minded people, an "Order of the sun", for which he wrote promotional literature published in Europe. His inheritance allowed him to support passage for his followers. In 1903, the first newcomers arrived on the island, including nature writer August von Bethmann-Alsleben (born 21 April 1864), from Heligoland, with whom Engelhardt wrote his main book The Carefree Future (1898). According to the New Zealand Herald: "The long-haired, naked vegetarians, thought to number no more than 30, were a stark contrast to Kaiser Wilhelm's rigid turn-of-the-century Germany – and modern-day perceptions of German colonisers in the Pacific as military men, traders or administrators." In June 1905, Heinrich Conrad joined Engelhardt, but returned to Germany in October. Wilhelm Heine joined the colony in November 1905, but died two months later.

With Bethmann, Engelhardt continued his promotional work. Bethmann wrote enthusiastic accounts of life on Kabakon, which were published in Germany. Bethmann later started to have doubts about the nudist living on Kabakon. He told a German civil servant of the government that, by June 1906, he would leave on the next available steamer for Germany; however, he died (possibly of malaria) in September 1906. There seems to have been a quarrel between Engelhardt and Bethmann, probably about Bethmann's wife, Anna Schwab. Bethmann married her after her arrival in mid-1906, and she encouraged him to eat tropical fruits rather than just coconuts. Engelhardt believed the fruits were the catalyst for his demise. Schwab returned to Germany two months later, to criticise the cult. As a result, the governor of the island ordered a halt to new immigrants. Engelhardt was again alone on the island.

=== New members ===
Engelhardt's cult was restarted with the coming of Heinrich Eukens and Max Lützow. Eukens was a 24-year-old vegetarian, originally from Heligoland, and then a student in Bavaria. Lützow was a conductor, violinist and pianist with the well-known Lützow Orchestra of Berlin; in glowing letters to Germany he talked about Kabakon and published a letter in the most-read vegetarian magazine in Germany. Other newcomers arrived until the community reached its peak of up to 30 members. However, disillusion quickly set in, with the members experiencing disease and accidents. Six weeks after his arrival, Eukens had died, after developing a cold then a fever, although the cause of death was undetermined. Lützow became seriously ill after being stranded for two days in a boat during a storm. After returning to the island, he wanted to visit the hospital in Herbertshöhe once he could reach the island Lamassa, but died from complications instead. Other members later left, so that the nudist community was near its end.

=== Change of weather ===
In 1903, a drought devastated the fruit crop. The remaining crop was wiped out in a storm in the spring of 1904. Engelhardt subsequently fell ill. At the insistence of Bethmann, who had not yet departed, Engelhardt went to the hospital in Herbertshöhe, where he was found to be in alarmingly poor health, weighing only 39 kg (86 lb) despite his height of 1.66 m (5 ft 5 in). He suffered from severe itching, and he was beset with skin ulcers, exhausted, and unable to walk. In summer 1905, he was taken to Herbertshöhe to be treated by Dr Wendland. With intensive care, he managed to recover but fled the hospital, returning to Kabakon. Dempwolff, a German doctor at the hospital in Herbertshöhe, judged Engelhardt "a paranoid wreck". According to The New York Times (15 October 1905), "[f]or nearly two years more he continued to live the 'pure, natural life'". He only attended to his plantation, but the coconut apostle became a point of interest for tourists in German New Guinea, among them painter Emil Nolde. It came to be considered a "must" to visit Kabakon and be photographed with the only remaining cocoivore.

=== Evolving writings ===
On recovery, Engelhardt founded "Sonnenorden Kabakon" (Order of the Sun Kabakon) at Kabakon, but it was refused official status by the island's German governor. Nevertheless, Ernst Schweizer from Switzerland arrived in 1908, but died a month later. Engelhardt continued to publish promotional literature including the bi-monthly "Für Sonne, Tropen u(nd) Kokosnuss!" between 1909 and 1913, co-funded by plantation manager, Wilhelm Bradtke, but his writings seemed increasingly confused. (Note: dwelt there several years editing a journal titled, 'Sun, Coconut and Grapes') Engelhardt again started a publicity campaign to find followers, but now the German government was cautious. A new follower of Engelhardt had first to deposit 1,400 Goldmarks for possible cost of hospital and the trip back. He announced he wanted to establish an "international tropical colonial empire of frugivores" for nudism and sun-worship, which should include the entire Pacific, South America, Southeast Asia and Central Africa. All civil servants were requested to warn every newly arriving settler of Kabakon, since Engelhardt had become unmistakably insane. The German colonial administration wanted to ensure that no further arrivals reach his island.

In 1909, Engelhardt closed down his "Order of the Sun" colony and visited German New Guinea. His plantation operated since 1909 as Engelhardt & Company and was farmed by manager Wilhelm Bradtke, a vegetarian who had arrived in Kabakon in March 1905. After nearly three months, Bradtke had decided against the lifestyle and began working for Queen Emma as manager of the Ralum Plantation. Writing in a vegetarian magazine in 1906, Bradtke documented Engelhardt's major leg wounds, gout in the fingers, skin rashes, fever and seizures. Four weeks later, Bradtke experienced similar symptoms, due to the mosquitoes and sandflies. He tried to convince Engelhardt to eat meat to improve his health. Bradtke's motto was "better to eat pork and live, than to eat coconuts and die." Engelhardt's health worsened, and allegedly he followed Bradtke's advice. Bradtke managed to make the plantation profitable in 1909. In 1910, Engelhardt tried to register a plot of 50 hectares on the island Towalik (west of Kabakon) as his property, in the land register. By 1913, Engelhardt had lost money on the magazine, and he fell into a depression. An admission fee of 3,000 marks had been imposed to prospective members of the colony by Wilhelm Bradtke, causing a shortage of newcomers. Engelhardt and Bradtke separated. Other plantation managers and converts arrived, but either returned or died.

According to the New Zealand Herald: "After Engelhardt fell seriously ill, the group's numbers dwindled; by 1913, before the outbreak of World War One, he was alone. He turned his attention to the cultivation of plants and their healing powers, interviewing many of the local people on the subject." In 1914, Engelhardt received a letter from Benedict Lust, leader of an American society of vegetarians about possible migration, but World War I stopped their plans. In 1913, Lust had published Engelhardt's book in English.

=== World War One ===
German New Guinea was captured on 11 September 1914. In early 1915, during World War I, Engelhardt was interned for three weeks in an Australian camp in Rabaul as a prisoner of war, but was dismissed as a crank. He then returned to Kabakon now occupied by Australia, where Gordon Thomas of the Rabaul Times visited him, also in 1915. His plantation was now managed by another German planter, Wilhelm Mirow, who later sold it to his Australian wife to escape expropriation by the Australians. Engelhardt continued to study the indigenous medicinal plants and homeopathy, and sent a lot of specimens to the botanic gardens of Brisbane and Sydney.

=== Engelhardt dies ===
Engelhardt continued to advocate sun worship and coconuts until he died in early May 1919 in his mid-40s. His body was found on the sixth of May. He was buried in Inabui Cemetery on Mioko, Duke of York islands, but there is no burial site, which was possibly destroyed in World War Two. Bradtke, his final follower, died on 10 May in Bitalolo Hospital near Herbertshohe. Bradtke is buried in the German cemetery in Herbertshöhe (now Kokopo).

Engelhardt was erroneously alleged to have died sometime after 1904, in a 1905 newspaper account, aboard a German government ship, near Herbertshohe: "Engelhardt refused all nourishment to the last, refused all medicine, and accused the missionary of interfering with his convictions. He wrought himself up to a great frenzy, fell upon the deck and was restrained only with difficulty from flinging himself overboard and swimming back to the island. Before the beach had sunk below the horizon the man was dead." According to The New York Times, "Wrapped in a German flag, Engelhardt, founder and survivor of the sun worshippers, was laid to rest beside Lutzow and Eukens on the beach at Kahakua (Kabakon)".

=== Expropriation ===
Mirow, on 26 July 1919, was appointed as executor. Through the Australian law on expropriation of German property (expropriation ordinance), the plantation and remaining assets of £6 fell on 6 May 1920 to the Australian state. Engelhardt's plantation was worthless. He left all his personal possessions, writings and paintings to Dr Berewenger in Berlin. Despite requests for these, nothing had been received as late as 1938.

=== Legacy ===
Swiss author Christian Kracht's 2012 novel Imperium is inspired by the life of Engelhardt. An English translation, Imperium – A Fiction of the South Seas, was published by Farrar Straus Giroux in 2015. Engelhardt appears as a major character in Adrian McKinty's 2014 novel The Sun Is God (ISBN 1616140682), whose plot revolves around real life suspicious deaths at the colony. McKinty visited the site of the Kabakon colony in 2014 and found few traces remaining of the Cocovore encampment.

=== Criticisms ===
Arnold Ehret maintained that Engelhardt's ill-health resulted from a failure to transition to a fruit diet. (Note: Man is so perfect that he can live on one kind of fruit only, at least for quite some time. This has been conclusively proven by the Mono-diet system of August Engelhardt who solved by his great philosophy and practice of natural life all problems of mankind. But a self-evident truth preached by nature must not be discarded just because no one has been able to apply it in actual practice on account of civilizational considerations. From the eating of fruit only, one gets first a crisis, i.e. cleansing.)

== Works ==
- Eine Sorgenfreie Zukunft (A Future Without Worries), August Bethmann & August Moritz Engelhardt, Remscheid: August Bethmann, 1st edition, 1898.
- Eine Sorgenfreie Zukunft, August Bethmann & August Moritz Engelhardt, 2nd edition, 1898.
- Eine Sorgenfreie Zukunft, August Bethmann & August Moritz Engelhardt, 3rd edition, 1899.
- Bethmann, August; Engelhardt, August (1906). Eine sorgenfreie Zukunft: Das neue Evangelium; Tief- u. Weitblicke f. d. Auslese der Menschheit … (4th ed.). Bethmann & Engelhardt.
- Eine Sorgenfreie Zukunft: Das neue Evangelium: Tief- und Weitblicke für die Auslese der Menschheit – zur Beherzigung für alle – zur Überlegung und Anregung, völlig umgearbeitete und erweiterte Aufl, Insel Kabakon bei Herbertshöhe, August Bethmann & August Moritz Engelhardt, 5th edition, Berlin: Engelska, 111 pages, 1906. Online at National Library of Australia, Canberra, A.C.T., 2009..
- Eine Sorgenfreie Zukunft, August Bethmann & August Moritz Engelhardt, 6th edition, Publisher: Harald Fischer Verlag, 2003.
- Eine Sorgenfreie Zukunft: practisch erprobte rathschlage eines modernen naturmenschen, August Moritz Engelhardt & August von Bethmann-Alsleben, 5th edition, Quedlinburg, 31 pages
- A Carefree Future: The New Gospel (Glimpse into The Depth And Distance for the Selection of Mankind, For The Reflection of All, For Consideration And Stimulation), August Bethmann & August Moritz Engelhardt, Publisher: New York: Benedict Lust Publications (1913); from the German (1898), 116 pages.
- Cocoivorism
- Fur Sonne Tropen und Kokonuss (Sun, Tropics and Coconuts), journal, 1909–1913.
- Engelhardt, August; Bethmann, August (2012). Hoch Der Äquator! Nieder Mit Den Polen! Eine Sorgenfreie Zukunft Im Imperium Der Kokosnuss. BoD – Books on Demand. ISBN 978-3-8482-0442-7.

== Related writings ==
- Biograpisches Handbuch Deutsch Neuguinea 1882–1922, Karl Baumann, 2002.
- The German South Pacific 1884–1914 – A Manual, Hermann Hiery, Schöningh, 2001, ISBN 3-506-73912-3. Chapter: "New Guinea, as a German Utopia: August Engelhardt and his Sunny North" by Dieter Klein.
- Mönter, Sven (2008). Following a South Seas Dream: August Engelhardt and the Sonnenorden. Research Centre for Germanic Connections with New Zealand and the Pacific, University of Auckland. ISBN 978-0-9582345-7-3.

== See also ==
- Coconuts
- Inedia
