= Kiepenheuer & Witsch =

German publishing house

- Founded: 1951
- Founder: Joseph C. Witsch
- Country of origin: Germany
- Headquarters location: Cologne
- Official website: Official website (in German)

Kiepenheuer & Witsch is a German publishing house, established in 1948 by Joseph C. Witsch and Gustav Kiepenheuer. The partners initially held 30% and 40% of the company's share capital respectively. The publisher is based in Cologne, Germany and has been part of the Holtzbrinck Publishing Group since 2002.

The publishing house has its own paperback series, Kiwi Paperback, established in 1982 and has owned the Galiani Berlin imprint since 2009.

== History ==
Following the end of World War II, Kiepenheuer & Witsch was one of few publishing houses who received permission to start printing books again.

Kiepenheuer died in 1949, after which Witsch took over control and broke the original link with the existing Gustav Kiepenheuer Verlag in Weimar (which had ended up in the Soviet occupation zone). For the Kiepenheuer & Witsch publishing business several years of major organisational restructuring followed. The first books to be published under the Kiepenheuer & Witsch imprint was the novel Marion by Vicki Baum, which appeared in 1951. In 1953 the firm acquired a new head office incorporating, for the first time, its own onsite publishing facilities, at Cologne-Marienburg.

== Authors ==
Kiepenheuer & Witsch fiction authors include:

- John Banville
- Julian Barnes
- Vicki Baum
- Saul Bellow
- Heinrich Böll
- Breyten Breytenbach
- Rolf Dieter Brinkmann
- Michael Chabon
- Don DeLillo
- Bret Easton Ellis
- Dave Eggers
- Dario Fo
- Jean Giono
- Marek Hłasko
- Nick Hornby
- Christian Kracht
- Jean-Marie Gustave Le Clézio
- Czesław Miłosz
- Gabriel García Márquez
- Wilhelm Reich
- Erich Maria Remarque
- Joseph Roth
- J. D. Salinger
- Ignazio Silone
- David Foster Wallace
- Günter Wallraff
- Feridun Zaimoglu

Nonfiction authors include:

- Ralph Giordano
- Joschka Fischer
- Heiner Geißler
- Carola Stern
- Alice Schwarzer
- Gerd Koenen
- Necla Kelek
- Patti Smith
- Helmut Schmidt
- Christoph Schlingensief
- Ranga Yogeshwar
- Thomas Hitzlsperger (autobiography Mutproben)
