= Boris Becker (disambiguation) =

Boris Becker (born 1967) is a German tennis player.

Boris Becker may also refer to:

- Boris Becker (internet personality) (born 1993), a Belgian internet personality
- Boris Becker (photographer) (born 1961), son of German poet Jürgen Becker
