= RCE - Remote Code Execution =

2022 novel by Sibylle Berg

RCE - Remote Code Execution is a dystopian science fiction novel by the German-Swiss author Sibylle Berg, published in April 2022 by Kiepenheuer & Witsch. It follows her work GRM. Brainfuck, and features some of the same characters, but stands alone and is not a direct sequel to it.

== Plot ==
The novel is set in a dystopian future, in which large parts of the world have become uninhabitable and governments have privatised infrastructure, health care and police. Most people live in a surveillance state, while the rich can afford to repair their bodies by nanobots. While most have resigned themselves to this state, a group of five hackers in Ticino, Switzerland, plan a digital revolution by spreading information about the exploitative system via Remote code execution (hence the title of the book).

== Reception ==
In literaturkritik.de, Werner Jung praises Berg's mastery of changing tone, from brash and post-punk to laconic, realistic narration, and compares the novel to the works of Dave Eggers. Rainer Moritz of Deutschlandfunk Kultur also sees parallels to Eggers, Raphaela Edelbauer, and Hanya Yanagihara, but complains of the characters becoming simple mouthpieces of the author at times. However, he describes it as "an exhausting, funny, annoying, redundant, humane book that omits no cliché, yet corresponds amazingly well to our apocalyptic present." Juliane Bergmann of NDR notes that the book has the typical Sybille-Berg sound; it envelops the reader in darkness and is hardly bearable and, hence, brilliant. However, she complains that the book loses itself in technical details, so the characters and dialogue, Berg's strengths, fail to reach their full potential. of the Frankfurter Rundschau notes that Berg uses her literary skill to address all the topical themes of the day and asks whether a revolution that removes everything that damages the bulk of humanity is possible without brute force.

The book made the Spiegel best-seller list shortly after its publication, entering at position 14.
