= Melara Mvogdobo =

Swiss-Cameroonian writer

Melara Mvogdobo (born 1972 in Lucerne, Switzerland) is a Swiss-Cameroonian writer and the author of two novels and has been shortlisted for the Caine Prize for African Writing.

== Early life ==
Mvogdobo's mother is Swiss and her father is from Cameroon. She trained as a teacher in Lucerne, and, after the birth of her three sons, lived in the Dominican Republic, Cameroon, and various parts of Switzerland. She has also taught severely traumatized young people and led workshops in textile handicrafts and tropical cuisine. In 2022, she moved with her family to Andalusia, Spain, where she currently lives.

== Literary career ==
Mvogdobo's debut novel, Von den fünf Schwestern, die auszogen, ihren Vater zu ermorden ("Of the Five Sisters Who Set Out to Murder Their Father"), was published by in 2023.

Her second novel, Großmütter (Grandmothers), was published by Transit Verlag in 2025. The novel is narrated in turn by two grandmothers, one from a poor Swiss farming family and the other from a wealthier Cameroonian family, and addresses themes of patriarchal oppression and self-determination. Großmütter was nominated for the Swiss Book Prize in 2025. It was ranked seventh on the St. Galler Tagblatt's list of the best Swiss novels of 2025.

Mvogdobo's short story "Dieu Merci!" was published in Literatur.Review's annual summer special in August 2025.

On 3 September 2026, "Dieu Merci!" was named one of five finalists for the 2026 Caine Prize for African Writing, selected from 407 entries submitted from 27 African countries.

== Awards and recognition ==
- Swiss Book Prize nomination (2025), for Großmütter
- Caine Prize for African Writing shortlist (3 September 2026), for "Dieu Merci!"

== Bibliography ==
- Von den fünf Schwestern, die auszogen, ihren Vater zu ermorden. Edition 8, 2023.
- Großmütter. Transit Verlag, 2025. ISBN 978-3-88747-416-4.
- "Dieu Merci!". Literatur.Review
