= Christian Haller =

Christian Haller may refer to:

- Christian Haller (curler) (born 1979), Swiss/Filipino curler
- Christian Haller (snowboarder) (born 1989), Swiss snowboarder
- Christian Haller (writer) (born 1943), Swiss novelist, dramaturg and poet
- Christian Haller (peasant leader) (16th century–1597), innkeeper and captain-in-chief during the Lower Austrian Peasant Revolt of 1596/1597
- Christian Haller Lindsay (1878–1941), American Major League Baseball player, nicknamed "Pinky" and "the Crab"
