= Martina Clavadetscher =

Swiss writer and playwright

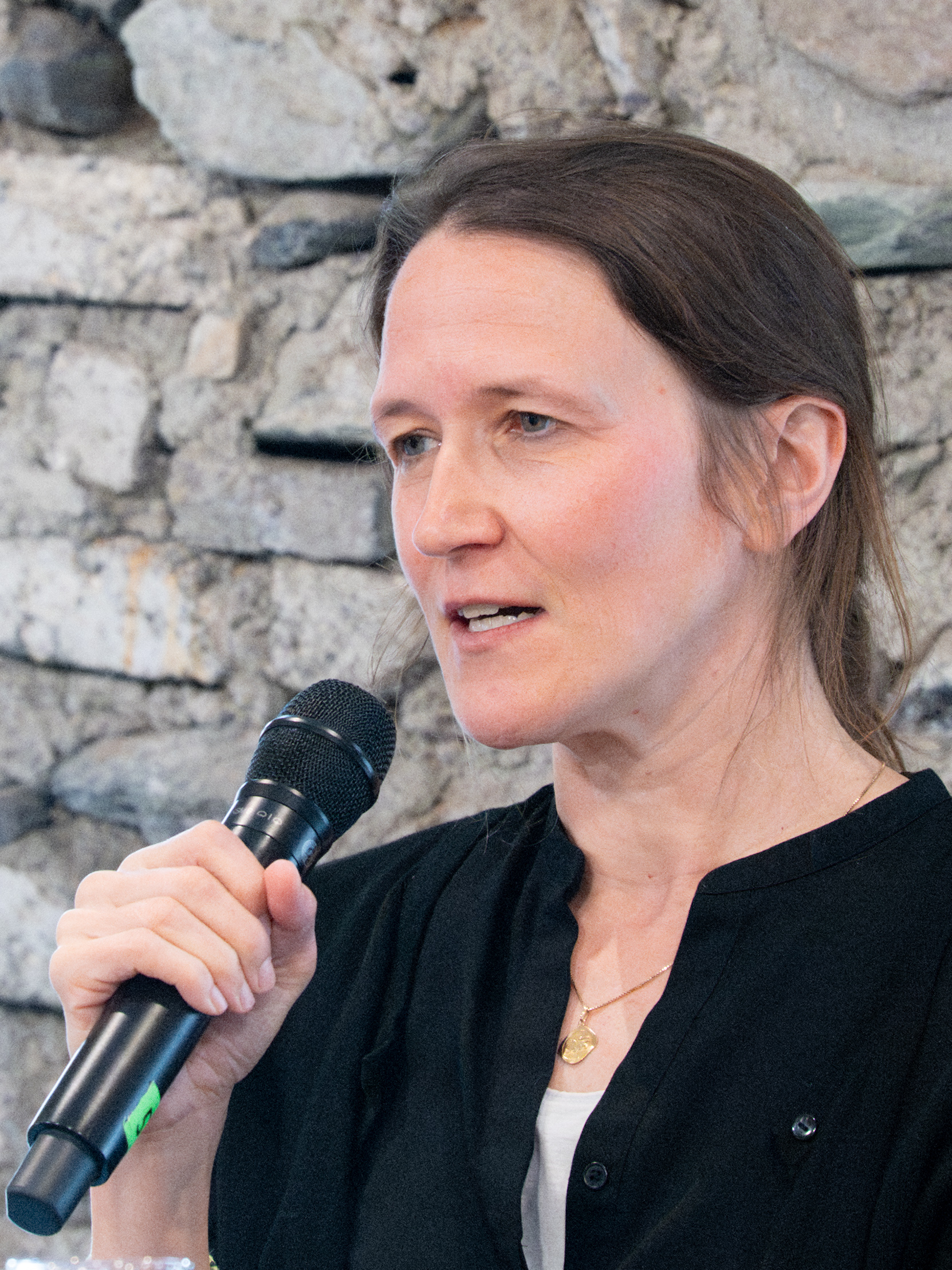
Martina Clavadetscher in 2026

Martina Clavadetscher (born 1979, Zug, Switzerland). is a Swiss playwright and book author. She was the recipient of several awards amongst them also the Swiss Book Prize of 2021.

== Education ==
She studied German, linguistics and philosophy at the University of Fribourg where she was also awarded with the Literature Prize of the University in 2004. She moved to Berlin on scholarship of Literary Colloquium Berlin in July 2018.

== Professional career ==
Since 2009, she writes plays, and is the presenter of radio program for the SRF 1. For the season 2013-2014 she was the resident author of the Theater Lucerne. In 2014 she published Sammler (Collectors) which made her known as an author of literature and with which she was invited to represent Switzerland at the Leipzig Book Fair. In 2016 she received the Prize of the Marianne and Curt Dienemann Foundation for her book project for her novel Knochenlieder (Song of Bones). She published the book in 2017 which was shortlisted for the Swiss Book Prize the same year. In 2021 she published the Erfindung der Ungehorsams (The Invention of Disobedience) which focuses on three women in different eras and continents. She often writes in the Canton of Schwyz, which she calls a region she gets inspired of. In 2022, Vor aller Augen (Before all eyes) in which she describes the fictional autobiographies of nineteen women portrayed in art and deals with the male gaze on women was published.

== Awards ==
- 2012 the Culture Prize of the Canton of Schwyz
- 2015 at the Essener Autorentagen for the play Umständliche Rettung (Cumbersome Rescue)
- 2016 Prize of the Marianne and Curt Dienemann Foundation for project of the book Knochenlieder (Songs of Bones)
- 2021 Swiss Book Prize for her Novel Die Erfindung der Ungehorsams (The Invention of Disobedience).
