= Hasko Weber =

German actor and theatre director

Hasko Weber (born 10 December 1963) is a German actor and theatre director.

== Life ==
Weber was born in Dresden. After his Abitur, he first did an apprenticeship as a machine and plant fitter and then trained as an actor from 1985 to 1989 at the Theaterhochschule Leipzig and at the studio of the Chemnitz municipal theatre. In 1989 he received his first engagement there as an actor and director under artistic director Gerhard Meyer. In the same year, he founded the theatre group "Dramatische Brigade", an independently working group with links to the Schauspielhaus, where Weber gained his first experience as a director.

In 1989, Weber was one of the organisers of the resistance against the Council of Ministers of East Germany at the Schauspiel Karl-Marx-Stadt/Chemnitz. After completing his studies, Weber first received a guest engagement as an actor at the Staatsschauspiel Dresden in 1990 and from the 1991/92 season was permanently engaged by artistic director Dieter Görne for the following two years at the same theatre as an actor with a directorship. From 1993 to 2001, he acted as theatre director at the Dresden Theatre.

Since 1998, Weber has also made guest appearances at various theatres and continued his work as a freelance director after his time in Dresden. He has directed productions in Karlsruhe, Saarbrücken, Mannheim, Lübeck, the Landestheater Tübingen and at the Berliner Ensemble.

In 2002, Weber was appointed by artistic director Friedrich Schirmer to the Staatstheater Stuttgart, where he became house director the following year. In the 2005/06 season, he succeeded Schirmer and took over as acting director at the Staatstheater Stuttgart. There, he directed the world premiere of Missions of Beauty by Sibylle Berg on 30 September 2010. He opened the renovated Schauspiel Stuttgart on 17 February 2012 with Schiller's Don Karlos.

Since August 2013, Weber has been general director at the Deutsches Nationaltheater und Staatskapelle Weimar. He has also been chairman of the Intendantengruppe des Deutschen Bühnenvereins since 2016.

In 2019, he commemorated the fall of the Berlin Wall 30 years ago with a temporary wall construction at the National Theatre in Weimar. In the art project Horizons, the Wall changes its appearance in 10 days through projections and thus becomes a sign of commonality between different people.

== Filmography ==
- 1990: Die Sprungdeckeluhr
- 1992: Wunderjahre
- 2011: Wer wenn nicht wir
- 2012: Tatort: Todesschütze (TV series)

== Awards ==
Weber's production of Henrik Ibsen's Brand won the Bayerischer Theaterpreis in 2002, the Staatstheater Stuttgart was named Theatre of the Year in 2006 under his directorship.
