= Reiner Kunze =

German writer and GDR dissident (born 1933)

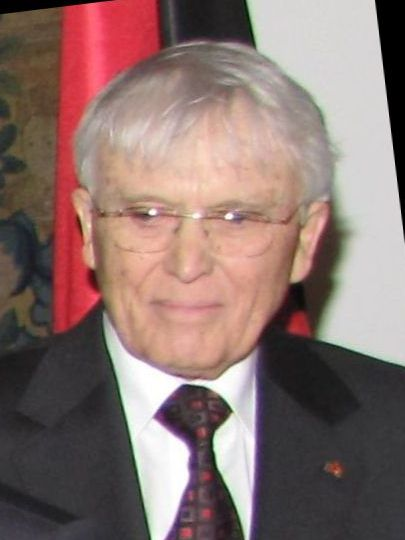
Reiner Kunze.

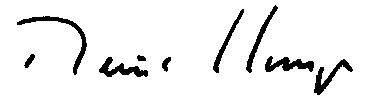
Signature.

Reiner Kunze (born 16 August 1933 in Oelsnitz, Erzgebirge, Saxony) is a German writer and GDR dissident. He studied media and journalism at the University of Leipzig. In 1968, he left the GDR state party SED following the communist Warsaw Pact countries invasion of Czechoslovakia in response to the Prague Spring. He had to publish his work under various pseudonyms. In 1976, his most famous book The Lovely Years, which contained critical insights into the life, and the policies behind the Iron Curtain, was published in West Germany to great acclaim. In 1977, the GDR regime expatriated him, and he moved to West Germany (FRG). He now lives near Passau in Bavaria.

His writings consist mostly of poetry, though he wrote prose as well, including essays. He is also a translator of Czech poetry and prose.

Kunze was a victim of the Stasi's Zersetzung psychological warfare program.

In 2009, he was awarded the Thüringer Literaturpreis.

== Works ==
- Die Zukunft sitzt am Tische. 1955 (with Egon Günther)
- Vögel über dem Tau. Liebesgedichte und Lieder. 1959
- Fragen des lyrischen Schaffens. 1960 (Beiträge zur Gegenwartsliteratur, Issue 18)
- Widmungen. 1963
- Die guten Sitten. 1964 (with Heinz Knobloch)
- Sensible Wege. 1969
- Der Löwe Leopold, fast Märchen, fast Geschichten. 1970
- Zimmerlautstärke. 1972
- Briefe mit blauem Siegel. 1973
- Die wunderbaren Jahre. 1976
- Das Märchen vom Dis (The Tale of Dis). 1976
- Die Wunderbaren Jahre. 1979 [movie script]
- Auf eigene Hoffnung. 1981
- Gespräch mit der Amsel. 1984
- Eines Jeden Einziges Leben. 1986
- Zurückgeworfen auf sich Selbst. Interviews (1984–1988), 1989
- Das weiße Gedicht. 1989
- Deckname Lyrik. 1990
- Wohin der Schlaf sich Schlafen Legt. 1991
- Am Sonnenhang, Tagebuch eines Jahres. 1993
- Steine und Lieder: Namibische Notizen und Fotos. 1996
- Ein Tag auf Dieser Erde. 1998
- Nocturne in E. 2001 (with Andreas Felger)
- Die Aura der Wörter. 2002
- Der Kuß der Koi. 2002
- Wo wir zu Hause das Salz haben. 2003
- Bleibt nur die eigene Stirn. 2005
- Lindennacht. 2007
- Die Stunde mit dir selbst. Gedichte. S. Fischer, Frankfurt am Main 2018, ISBN 978-3-10-397376-1.

== Awards ==
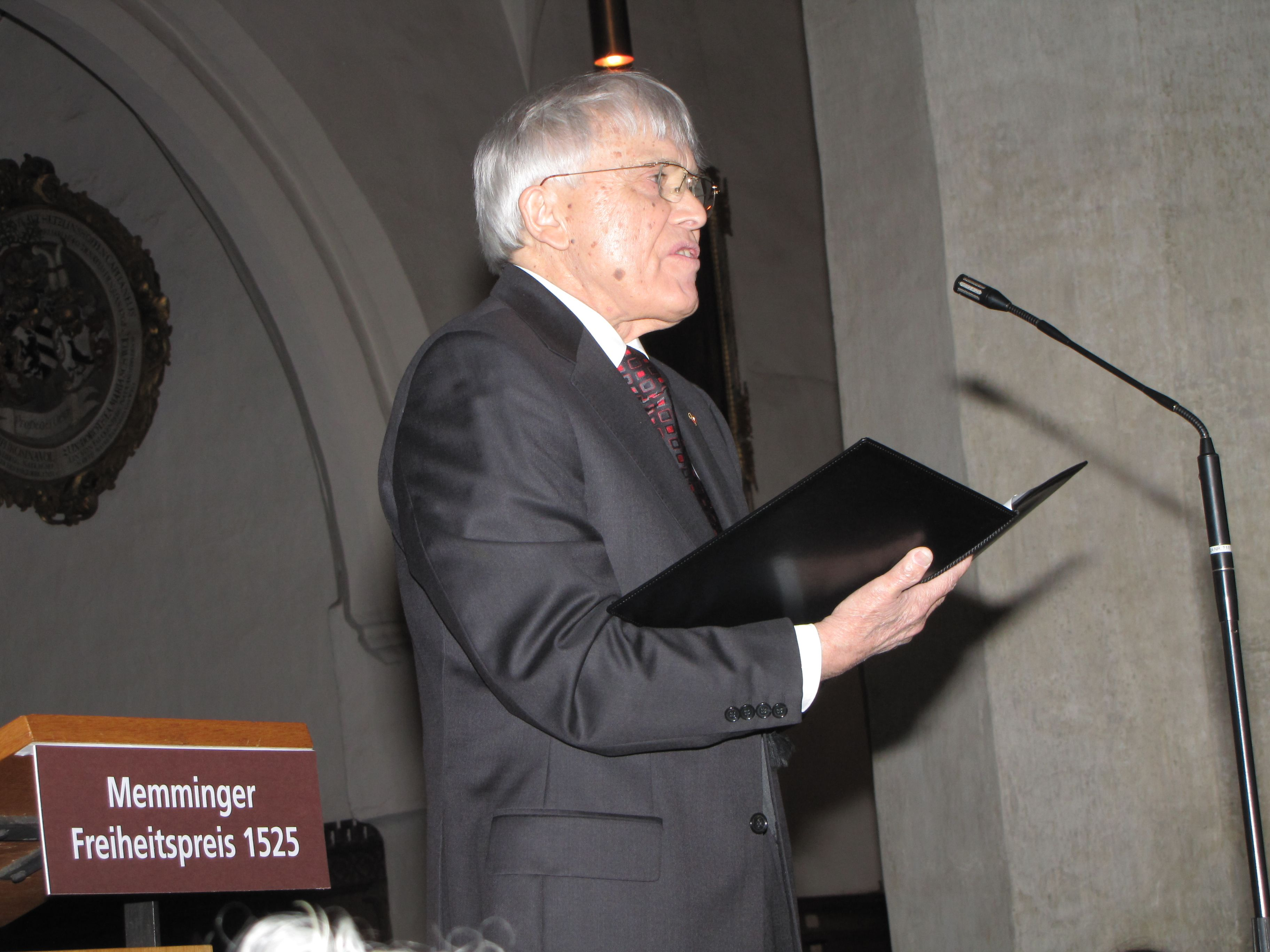
Reiner Kunze in 2009 in the St. Martins Church at Memmingen

- 1968 Übersetzerpreis des Tschechoslowakischen Schriftstellerverbandes
- 1971 Deutscher Jugendbuchpreis
- 1973 Großer Literaturpreis der Bayerischen Akademie der Schönen Künste and Mölle Literature Prize, Sweden
- 1977 Georg Trakl Prize, Austria, Andreas-Gryphius-Preis and Georg Büchner Prize
- 1979 Bavarian Film Awards, Best Screenplay
- 1981 Geschwister Scholl-Preis
- 1984 Eichendorff-Literaturpreis
- 1988 Bavarian Order of Merit
- 1989 Kulturpreis Ostbayerns
- 1990 Herbert und Elsbeth Weichmann-Preis and Hanns Martin Schleyer Prize
- 1993 Commander's Cross of the Order of Merit of the Federal Republic of Germany, Kulturpreis deutscher Freimaurer and Honorary doctorate Technische Universität Dresden
- 1995 Honorary citizenship of the city of Greiz and Culture award of the district of Passau
- 1997 Weilheimer Literaturpreis
- 1999 Friedrich-Hölderlin-Preis
- 2000 Christian Ferber-Ehrengabe der Deutschen Schillerstiftung
- 2001 Hans Sahl Prize and Bavarian Maximilian Order for Science and Art
- 2002 Kunstpreis zur deutsch-tschechischen Verständigung
- 2003 Ján Smrek Prize and honorary citizenship of the city of Oelsnitz, Erzgebirge
- 2004 STAB-Preis der Stiftung für Abendländische Besinnung and Czech translation prize Premia Bohemica
- 2006 Guest of Honor of the Heinrich-Heine-Haus Lüneburg
- 2008 Order of Merit of the Free State of Thuringia
- 2009 Memminger Freiheitspreis 1525 and Thüringer Literaturpreis
- 2013 Robert Schuman Medal, EPP Group
- 2013 America Award for a lifetime contribution to international writing

== British/American editions ==
- The Lovely Years
- In Time of Need: A Conversation about Poetry, Resistance & Exile (with Mireille Gansel)
- Zimmerlautstarke With the Volume Down Low (Swamp Press, 1981)
