= Freie Akademie der Künste Hamburg =

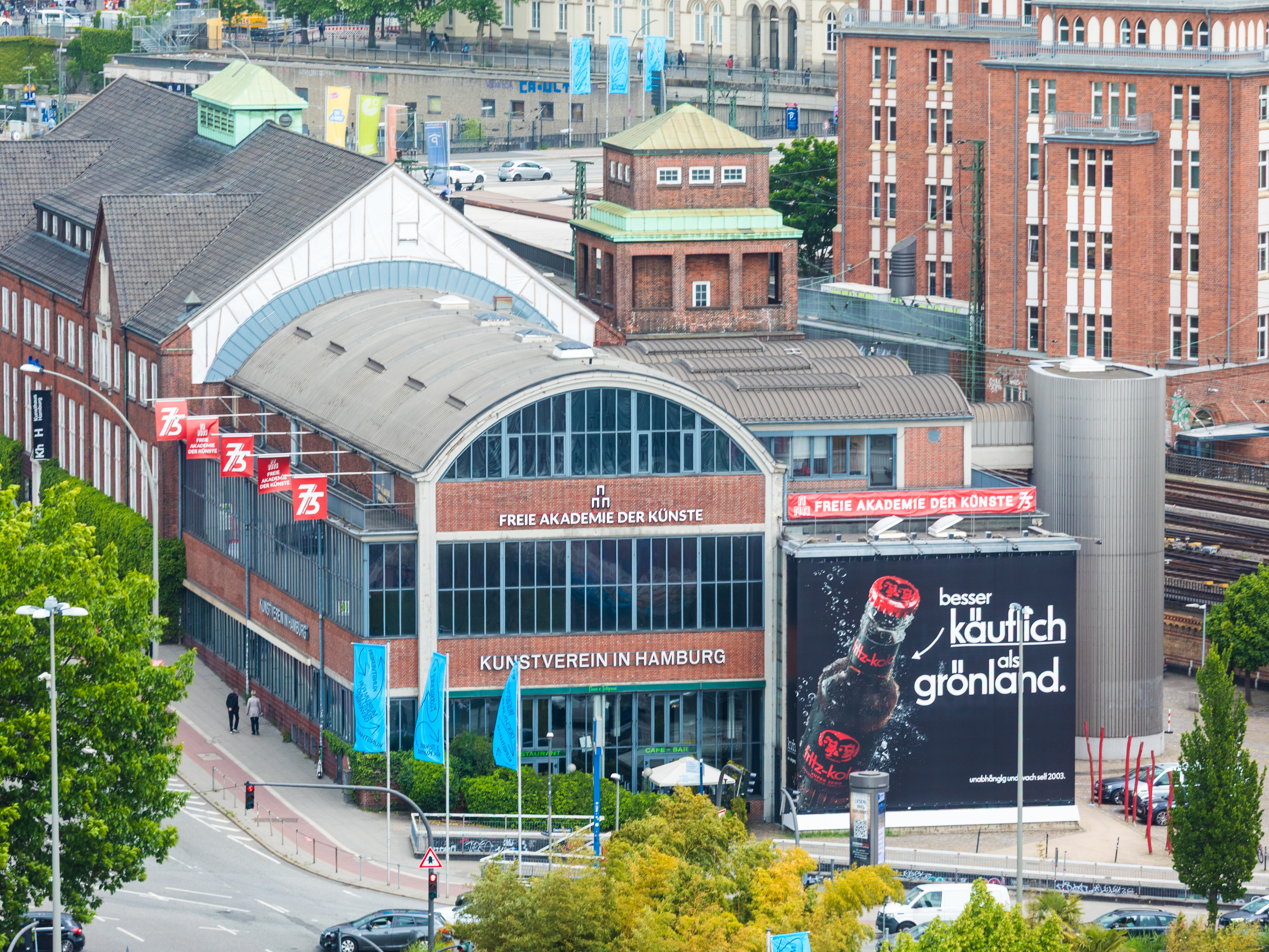
- Freie Akadamie der Künste in the "Markthalle"
- Formation: 1950
- Type: e.V.
- Purpose: Association of artists
- Headquarters: Hamburg, Germany

The Freie Akademie der Künste in Hamburg e.V. is a not-for-profit association of artists, founded in 1950 by the organ-builder and writer Hans Henny Jahnn. It now includes architecture, visual arts, performing arts, literature, media and music sections. The current president is Monique Schwitter, elected in 2021, after being member of the academy since 2012. Burghart Klaußner is the current vice president. The previous president was Ulrich Greiner, elected in 2011.
