= Monique Schwitter =

Swiss writer and actress (born 1972)

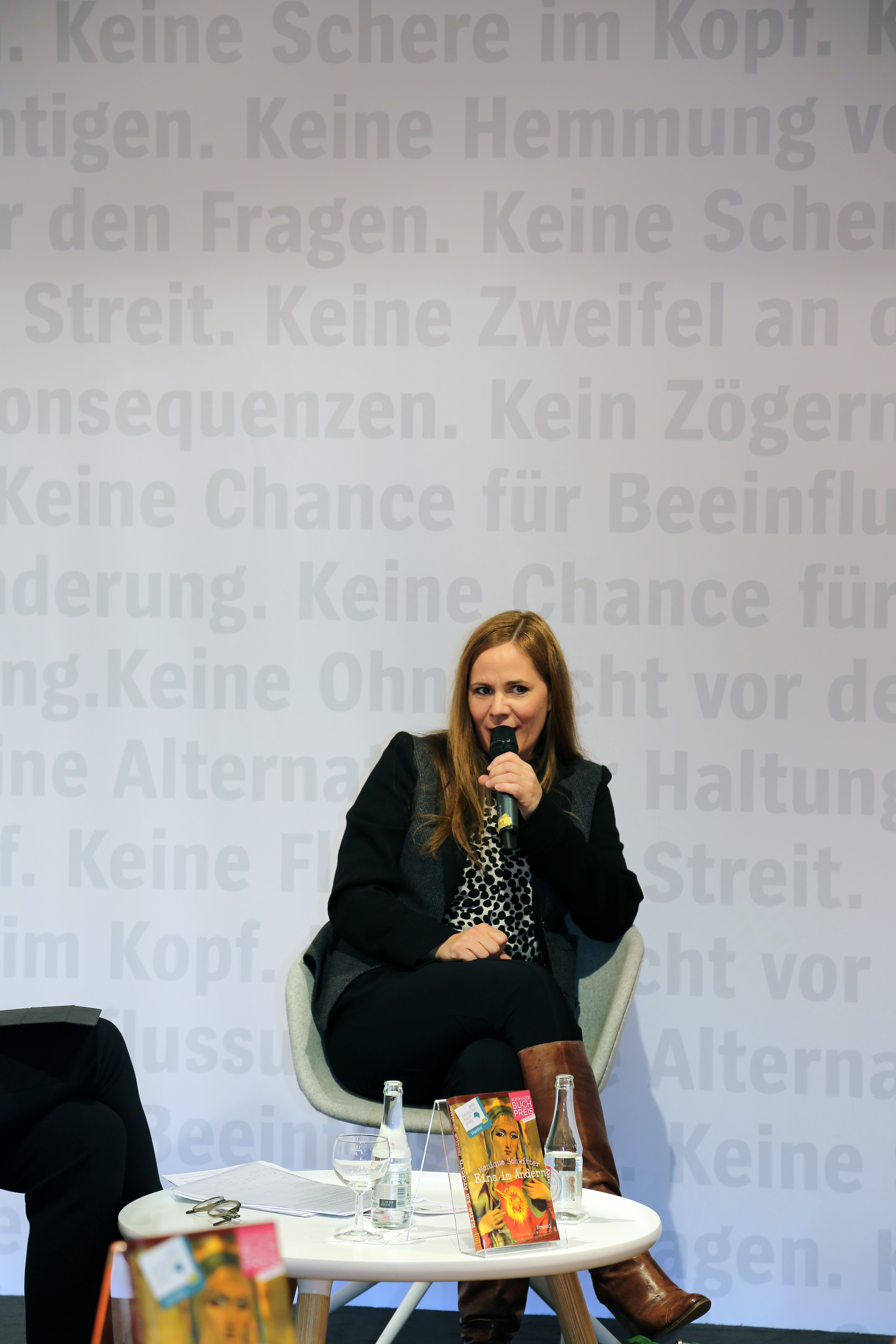
- Schwitter in 2015
- Born: 1972 (age 53–54); Zurich, Switzerland
- Occupations: Writer and actress
- Known for: Novel Eins im Andern (2015)

Monique Schwitter (born 2 March 1972) is a Swiss writer and actress.

== Life and career ==
Schwitter was born in Zürich, Switzerland. She studied stage direction and theater at the Mozarteum Salzburg from 1993 to 1997. Having graduated, she worked as an actress at top-level houses for five years, such as the Schauspielhaus Zürich, the Schauspiel Frankfurt, and Schauspielhaus Graz. She was then an ensemble member at the Deutsches Schauspielhaus in Hamburg. Throughout that period, she was a reciter, a dubbing actor and directed and produced several literary features about Peter Handke, Ernst Jandl, Raymond Queneau, and Sarah Kane. At the Deutsche Schauspielhaus she curated a literary salon and performed as a blues singer. In her acting career, she regularly was part of numerous theater festivals, such as Mülheimer Theatertagen (1999), "Reich und Berühmt" in Berlin (2001), "Theater der Welt" in Stuttgart (2005), Vienna Festival (2006), Salzburg Festival (2006), "Theaterformen" in Hannover (2007) and Berliner Theatertreffen (2008).

Starting 2002, she contributed prose and short stories in various literary magazines. After the editor Alfred Kolleritsch had become interested in her work, she published much of her early work in the Austrian literary magazine Manuskripte. Her first collection of short stories, Wenn's schneit beim Krokodil, was published in 2005 and was awarded the Robert-Walser Preis (2006) and a prize by the Deutsche Schillerstiftung. In 2008, the theater Lucerne comissed the piece Himmels-W, which premiered there on April 3, 2008. In the same year, she was invited to participate in the 2008 Max Frisch Symposium in Brussels. Her debut novel Ohren haben keine Lider was also released in 2008 and was translated into Chinese in 2010 for the Expo in Shanghai. Her second volume of short stories, Goldfish Memory (German: Goldfischgedächtnis), was launched in 2011. In 2010, Monique Schwitter decided to end her acting career, in order to pursue writing full-time.

Nominated by Hildegard Elisabeth Keller, she took part at the Festival of German-Language Literature (Ingeborg-Bachmann-Prize) in 2015. Her novel Eins im Andern was short listed for the German Book Prize (German: Deutscher Buchpreis) and received the Swiss Book Prize (German: Schweizer Buchpreis. The novel is about a forty-year-old woman who during a random google search discovers that her first love had committed suicide many years ago. Learning this, she recounts the biography of her love life by telling the story of twelve previous lovers. In 2016, it was awarded the Swiss Literary Prize (German: Schweizer Literaturpreis).

Her work has been translated into several languages, including French, Danish, Italian, Dutch, Chinese, Russian, Polish, and English.

Schwitter lives in Hamburg with her family since 2005.

After being a member of the Freie Akademie der Künste Hamburg since 2012, she was elected president in 2021.

== Published works ==
- Wenn's schneit beim Krokodil. Short Stories. Literaturverlag Droschl, Graz 2005, ISBN 978-3-8542-0694-1.
- Ohren haben keine Lider. Novel. Residenz, Salzburg 2008, ISBN 978-3-7017-1494-0.
- Himmels-W. Theater piece 2008.
- Goldfischgedächtnis. Short Stories. Literaturverlag Droschl, Graz 2011, ISBN 978-3-8542-0789-4.
  - Goldfish Memory Cardigan: Parthian 2015
- Eins im Andern. Novel. Literaturverlag Droschl, Graz 2015, ISBN 978-3-85420-969-0.

== Awards ==
- 2001: Nestroy-Nomination, best young actor for the role of Mariedl in Die Präsidentinnen by Werner Schwab
- 2003: Nestroy-Nomination, best young actor for performing Janis Joplin and Marie in Woyzeck by Georg Büchner
- 2004: Hermann-Lenz-Stipendium
- 2005: Prize of the Marianne und Curt Dienemann-Stiftung
- 2006: Robert Walser Prize for Wenn’s schneit beim Krokodil
- 2006: Förderpreis of the Schweizerische Schillerstiftung
- 2011: Rotahorn Literature Prize
- 2012: Aufenthalts-Stipendium der Sparte Literatur im Künstlerhaus Lauenburg
- 2013: Manuskripte-Preis
- 2015: Swiss Book Prize, for Eins im Andern
- 2016: Stipendium of the Heinrich-Heine-Haus in Lüneburg
- 2016: Swiss Literature Awards
