= Dorothee Elmiger =

Swiss writer

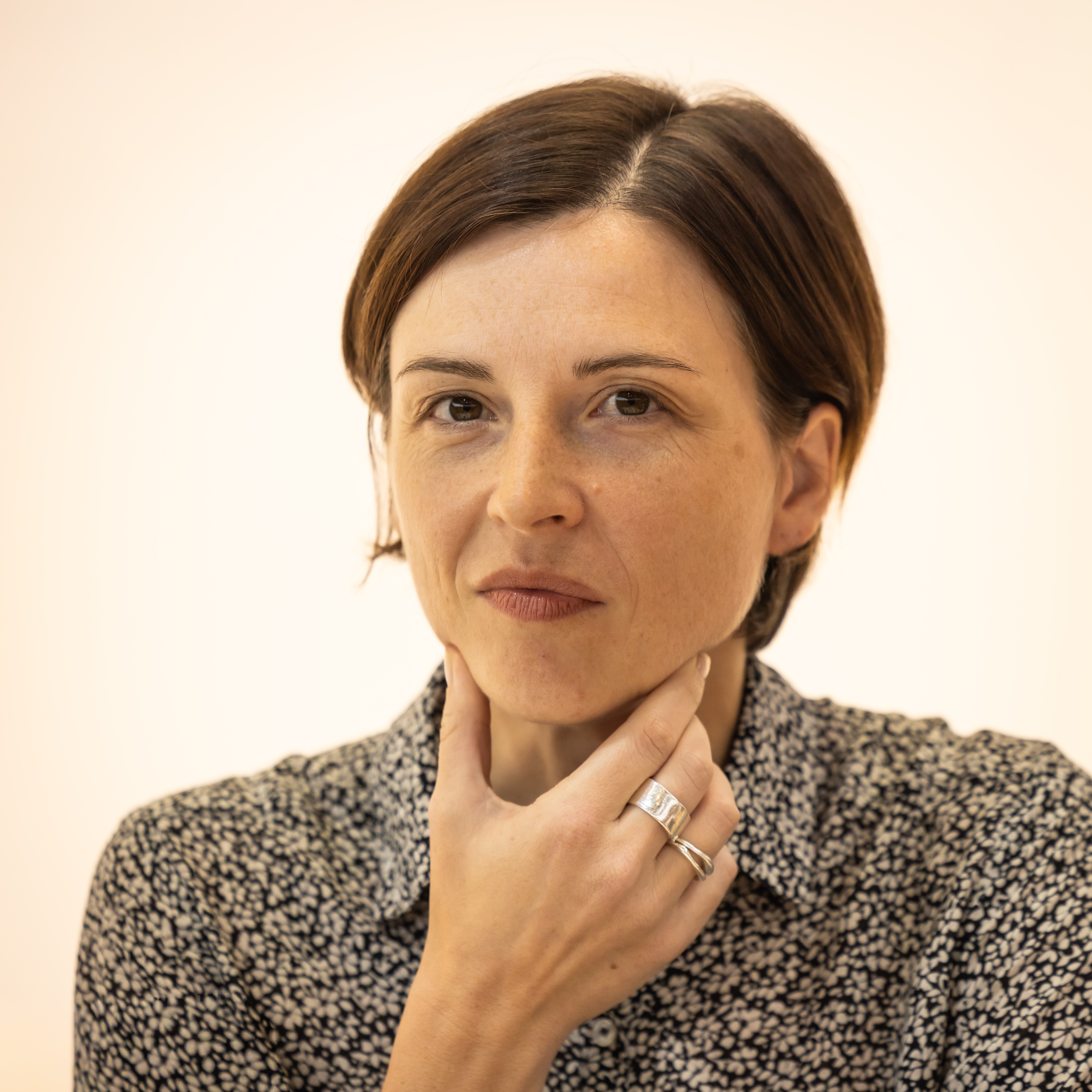
- Dorothee Elmiger at the Frankfurt Book Fair 2025
- Born: 13 October 1985 (age 40); Wetzikon, Switzerland
- Occupation: Writer
- Writing career
- Language: German

Dorothee Elmiger (born 13 October 1985 in Wetzikon) is a Swiss writer, translator and historian. She has been awarded numerous prizes, including the German Book Prize and the Swiss Book Prize for her novel Die Holländerinnen in 2025.

== Early life and education ==
Dorothee Elmiger was born in Wetzikon a town in the German speaking area of Northern Switzerland. She has three younger siblings. She grew up in Appenzell-Innerrhoden and attended school in Appenzell and spent one year in New Hampshire before finishing high school in 2005. Elmiger studied history, philosophy, and political science in Zurich, then completed a bachelor's degree in literary writing at the Swiss Literary Institute in Biel. In 2008, she spent one year in Leipzig to study literature. From 2009 onward she studied political science at Berlin, and Lucerne.

== Career ==
In 2009, she won a scholarship at the Klagenfurt literature course. One year later in 2010 she read from her first book at the Klagenfurt Ingeborg Bachmann competition and won the Kelag Prize. Since then, Elmiger has won numerous prizes, including the aspekte-Literaturpreis and the Rauris Literature Prize for best literary debut. In 2014, she received the Hermann-Hesse-Förderpreis for her second novel Schlafgänger, in 2015 she was awarded a Swiss Literature Award by the Federal Office of Culture and the Erich Fried Prize. Her novel Out of the Sugar Factory (Aus der Zuckerfabrik, 2020) was shortlisted for both the German Book Prize and the Swiss Book Prize. In 2023 she was Max Kade Writer-in-Residence at the University of Michigan. In October 2025 her novel Die Holländerinnen (The Dutch Women) won the German Book Prize and the Bayerischer Buchpreis (de), and in November 2025 it was also awarded the Swiss Book Prize.

== Personal life ==
In 2023 she moved to Queens, New York City and per Buch Basel website as of October 2025, she still lived in New York.

== Work ==
Elmiger is known for her experimental and socially critical texts, which explore themes such as capitalism, history, and identity. Her works combine fictional elements with documentary approaches and are praised for their poetic and dense language. Her work has been translated into several languages, including English, French, Italian, Swedish and Turkish.

== Selected publications ==
- Einladung an die Waghalsigen. DuMont, Cologne 2010, ISBN 978-3-8321-9612-7
- Schlafgänger. DuMont, Cologne 2014, ISBN 978-3-8321-9742-1
- Aus der Zuckerfabrik. Hanser, Munich 2020, ISBN 978-3-446-26750-3
- Die Holländerinnen. Hanser, Munich 2025, ISBN 978-3-446-28298-8
