= Jonas Lüscher =

Swiss writer (born 1976)

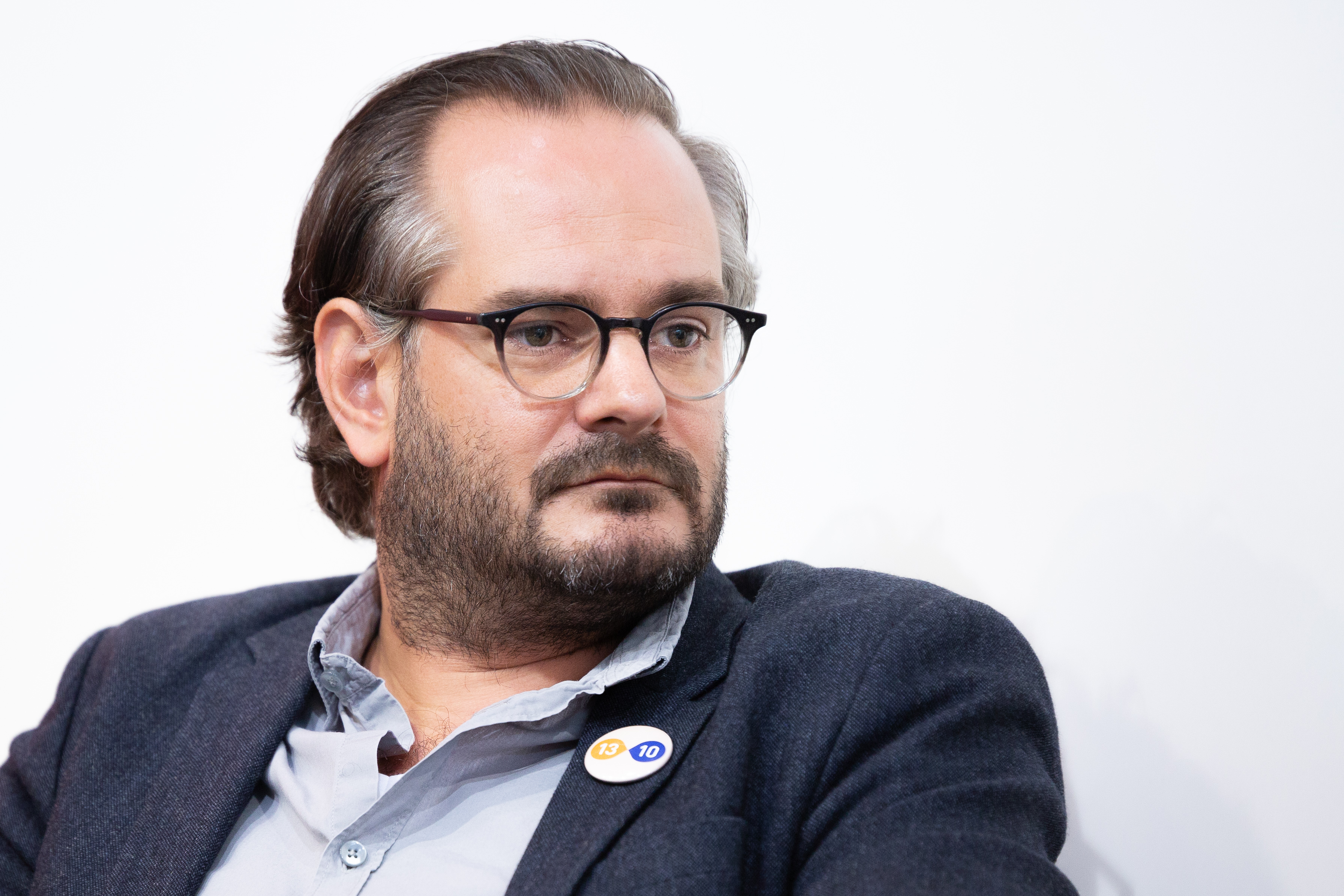
Jonas Lüscher in 2018

Jonas Lüscher (born 22 October 1976 in Schlieren, Switzerland) is a Swiss writer, including of essays and novels, living in Germany.

== Early life ==
Lüscher grew up in Bern, where he later trained between 1994 and 1998 at the Muristalden Evangelical Teacher Training School (Evangelisches Lehrerseminar Muristalden) to qualify as a primary school teacher.

== Career ==
He spent a few years as a script editor and screenwriter for the Munich film industry. He then undertook studies at the Munich School of Philosophy from 2005 to 2009, earning a master's degree in 2009. At the same time, he was working as a freelance editor.

From 2009 to 2001, Lüscher researched ethics in science at the TTN Institute (Institut Technik-Theologie-Naturwissenschaften) at LMU Munich.

In 2011, Lüscher moved to the Swiss Federal Institute of Technology Zürich (Eidgenössische Technische Hochschule Zürich or ETH). There, he embarked on a dissertation under the supervision of philosopher Michael Hampe on the work of Richard Rorty. In 2012–13, Lüscher was awarded a grant by the Swiss government enabling him to spend nine months as a visiting researcher in the Comparative Literature Department at Stanford University in California. At the end of 2014, Lüscher left ETH without completing his dissertation.

Lüscher is a member of the PEN Centre Germany, and began living in Munich in 2001.

His first novel, Frühling der Barbaren (Barbarian Spring, translated by Peter Lewis) was nominated in 2013 for both the Swiss Book Prize and the German Book Prize.

In August 2025 his latest novel Verzauberte Vorbestimmung (Enchanted Destiny) was placed on the longlist of the German Book Prize.

== Selected works ==
- Jetzt. Libretto for the opera by Mathis Nitschke, original production at the Opéra National de Montpellier, 30 November 2012.
- Frühling der Barbaren. Novella. C.H. Beck, Munich 2013. ISBN 978-3-406-64694-2 translated by Peter Lewis as Barbarian Spring, Haus Publishing, London 2014. ISBN 978-1-908-32383-5
- Kraft. Novel. C.H. Beck, Munich 2017. ISBN 978-3-406-70531-1, longlisted for the 2017 German Book Prize. Translated by Tess Lewis as Kraft, Farrar, Straus and Giroux, New York, 2020. ISBN 978-0-374-18214-4
- Verzauberte Vorbestimmung (in German). München: Hanser. 2025. ISBN 978-3-446-28304-6.

== Awards ==
- 2013: Franz-Hessel-Preis for Frühling der Barbaren
- 2013: Literary Award of Kanton Bern
- 2013: Bayerischer Kunstförderpreis
- 2016: Hans Fallada Prize for Frühling der Barbaren
- 2017: Schweizer Buchpreis (Swiss Book Award) for Kraft
- 2022: Max Frisch Prize
- 2025: Rheingau Literatur Preis for Verzauberte Vorbestimmung
- 2025: Wilhelm Raabe Literature Prize for Verzauberte Vorbestimmung

== Literature ==
- Stefan Hofer-Krucker Valderrama: Die perpetuierte Katastrophe. Globalisierung und ihre Schattenseiten in Jonas Lüschers "Frühling der Barbaren". Mit einigen literaturdidaktischen Anmerkungen. In: Almut Hille, Sabine Jambon, Marita Meyer (Eds.): Globalisierung – Natur – Zukunft erzählen. Aktuelle deutschsprachige Literatur für die Internationale Germanistik und das Fach Deutsch als Fremdsprache. ISBN 978-3-86205-410-7, Munich 2015, pp. 39–57.
- Lüscher, Jonas (15 March 2015). Barbarian Spring. Haus Publishing. ISBN 978-1-908323-84-2.
- Yvonne Hütter: Ethics and Aesthetics in Jonas Lüscher’s "Barbarian Spring". In: Primerjalna književnost, No. 40.2, 2017, pp. 149–163.
