= The Main Thing Is Work! =

Satirical play written by Sibylle Berg

The Main Thing Is Work! (German:Hauptsache Arbeit!) is a satirical play written by the Swiss author and influential playwright Sibylle Berg. The play had its premiere at Die Staatstheater Stuttgart.

== Theme ==
The play takes place on a boat centering around an insurance companies party, which turns into a game show highlighting the blatant absurdity of much waged work.

A pair of rats comment, interrupt as well as seem to orchestrate the turn of events, while taking on the role of narrators in a brechtian style. The rats are responsible for a kind of Milgram experiments of work with electric shocks being administered to the workers.

Some of the characters include: an abusive boss, a workaholic obsessed with fitness and performance, a HR-representative with Stockholm syndrome, an alienated and indifferent office worker, a female wage worker who has given up on everything in life except good food and a woman who gets sexually harassed by her boss, etc.

The play is a reflection about what the work that most people conduct means, how it affects, and controls our lives. In short, what work does to us.

The tone is cynical, and there is a large variety and amount of stories presented which dismantles usual narratives justifying peoples relation to work and the common logic of our working situations. This leaves the audience with a sense of disarmament and ruin, creating a new space of possibility for something else to fill that void of thought. The play mainly criticizes meaningless work, the taken for granted 40 hour work week, the way we often come to identify with the social role one takes on at work, and how it dominates peoples lives and lifetime and structure peoples sense of what's imaginable and attainable.

== Reception ==
The theater critic Cecilia Djurberg wrote that "If I had not already left this soulsucking work culture behind me, I would have needed a serious trigger warning before I saw the Swedish premiere of Sibylle Bergs work life satire The Main Thing Is Work! That's how heavy flashbacks it gives me."

The theater critic Ingegärd Waaranperä called the play "A thriller-comedy about works demeaning and characteristic elements. It's both unsettling and fun."

The chief dramaturge Bochow of Die Staatstheater Stuttgart considered "the insurance employees [to] stand for a psychogram of an entire society."

== See also ==
- Critique of work
- Episches Theater
- Karoshi
