= Kim de l'Horizon =

Swiss novelist (born 1992)

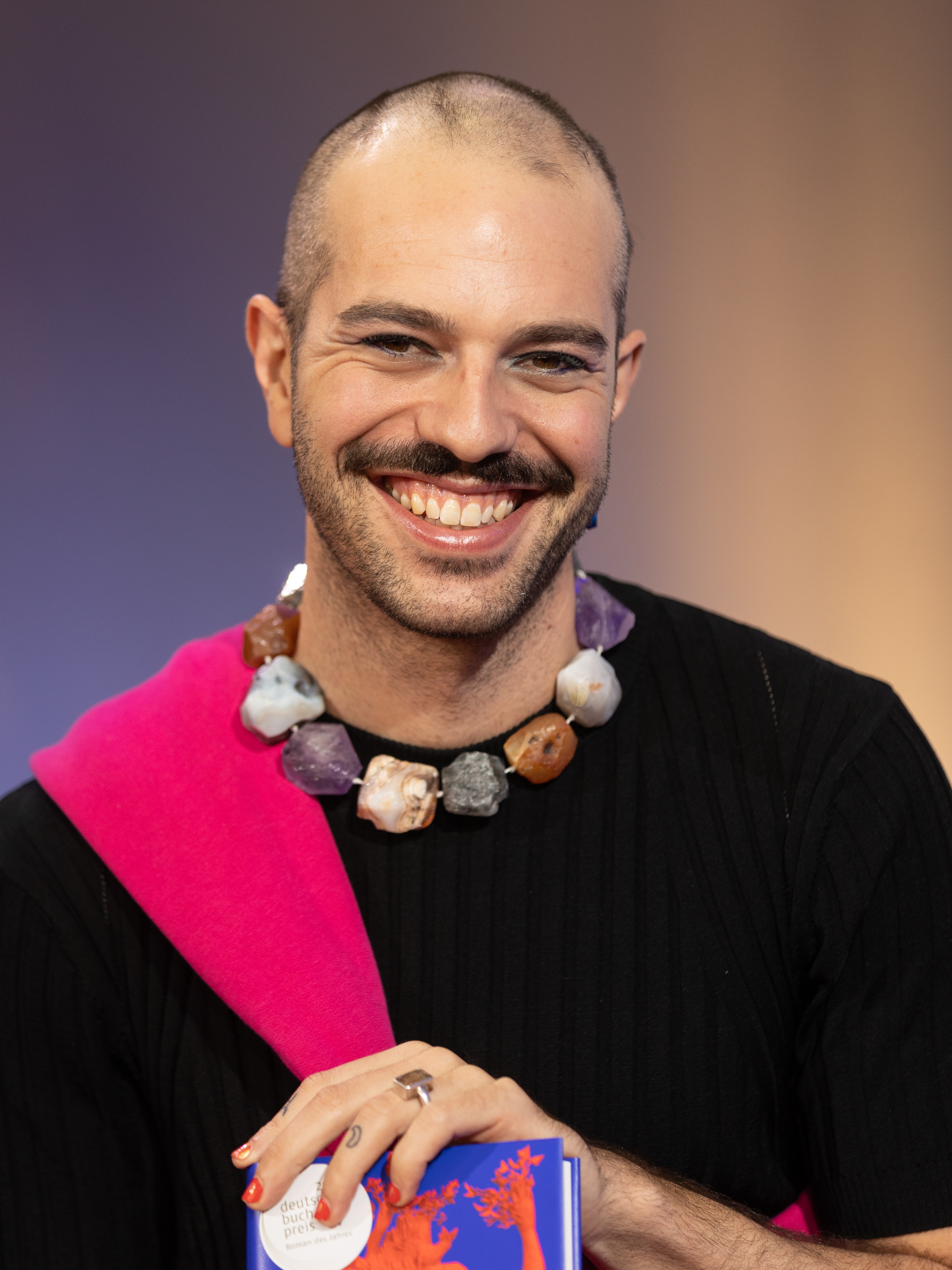
- At the Frankfurt Book Fair in 2022
- Born: 9 May 1992 (age 34); Ostermundigen, Bern, Switzerland
- Education: University of Zurich
- Occupations: Writer; thespian
- Writing career
- Notable work: Blutbuch (Note: "Blutbuch" may be translated as either "copper beech" in Swiss German, or "blood book" in standard German, where "blood" could refer to the liquid, to violence, and to familial relations.)
- Notable awards: German Book Prize (2022); Swiss Book Prize (2022)

Kim de l'Horizon (born 9 May 1992) is a Swiss non-binary novelist, playwright and thespian. In 2022, they (Note: De l'Horizon is non-binary. According to their Instagram profile, they either use no pronouns or dey/dem pronouns, German-language neopronouns equivalent to they/them.) won the German Book Prize and the Swiss Book Prize for their debut novel Blutbuch.

== Early life and education ==
De l'Horizon was born in Ostermundigen, Bern, on 9 May 1992. (Note: A fictional biography of de l'Horizon states that they were born in 2666 on Gethen. De l'Horizon states that this is both a reference to the novel 2666 by Roberto Bolaño (which represents the future to de l'Horizon) and the novel The Left Hand of Darkness by Ursula K. Le Guin (in which people on the planet Gethen do not have a fixed gender).) De l'Horizon moved to the canton of Zurich at the age of seven, and attended gymnasium in Winterthur. De l'Horizon started using a pen name, an anagram of their legal first name and last name.

De l'Horizon studied German studies, film studies, and theater studies at the University of Zurich and the University of Bern, as well as literary writing at the Swiss Literary Institute in Biel, Bern. In 2022 De l'Horizon was completing a master's degree in transdisciplinary studies at the Zurich University of the Arts.

== Career ==
De l'Horizon is an editor of the literary magazine Delirium. In 2014, de l'Horizon was a co/author of the Szenart production Industrial Radio in cooperation with Radio Kanal K and the Aargauer Literaturhaus Lenzburg. As a member of the collective E0b0ff, de l'Horizon wrote the text of, acted in, and developed costumes for the production Wie eine Barke das Meer aus Testosteron durchpflügen ('Plow through the sea of testosterone like a barge'), which the collective staged in 2017. Between 2017 and 2019 de l'Horizon contributed to the Swiss magazine Tsüri.

De l'Horizon was the 2021–2022 resident author at the Bern Theatre. In September 2022, the theater hosted the premiere of de l'Horizon's play Hänsel & Greta & The Big Bad Witch, the first in a planned series of what de l'Horizon classifies as "posthumanist theater" plays. They are also the author of the 2021 play Dann mach Limonade, Bitch ('Then make lemonade, bitch').

De l'Horizon won numerous prizes, including the 2015 Treibhaus and the OpenNet competition at the Solothurn Literaturtage für Prosa (Literature Days for Prose), the Textstreich competition for poetry, the Dramenprozessor 2020 sponsorship award from the Winkelwiese theater and a short film competition from the German daily Hannoversche Allgemeine Zeitung.

== Blutbuch ==
External videos
- German Book Prize award ceremony

De l'Horizon's debut novel, Blutbuch, is an autofictional novel about secrets and silences within a family and took de l'Horizon ten years to write. In the novel, the non-binary narrator resides in Zurich, after having escaped from life in a small conservative village in Switzerland. Once the narrator's grandmother starts to suffer from dementia, the narrator begins to open up.

In 2022, de l'Horizon won the Literature Prize of the Jürgen Ponto Foundation, the German Book Prize, and the Swiss Book Prize for Blutbuch. The jury for the German Book Prize based their decision on the "urgency and literary innovative power" of de l'Horizon's novel, which they were "provoked and enthusiastic" about. De l'Horizon became the first non-binary person to win the German Book Prize.

During the award ceremony for the German Book Prize, de l'Horizon intoned the song Nightcall by Kavinsky before shaving their head in a sign of solidarity with women in Iran following the death of Mahsa Amini, and dedicated the prize to them. (Note: People have cut their hair to protest the September 2022 death of Mahsa Amini, who died after being taken into custody by the Iranian morality police for allegedly wearing a hijab in a manner that violated the dress code.) De l'Horizon's gesture was met with cheers and a standing ovation from the audience. Sabine Kieselbach of Deutsche Welle stated that this sort of reception had never happened before in the history of the German Book Prize. After the ceremony, de l'Horizon was the target of threats and online vitriol. People gave Blutbuch one-star reviews on Amazon, and security was provided for de l'Horizon's appearances at the Frankfurt Book Fair.

== Personal life ==
De l'Horizon lives in Zurich and speaks Bernese German. They consider themself genderfluid. They regard Kim de l'Horizon as a fictional character ("Autorenkunstfigur") who studies witchcraft with the feminist writer Starhawk.
