= Sibylle Berg =

Swiss author and playwright (born 1962)

Sibylle Berg MEP
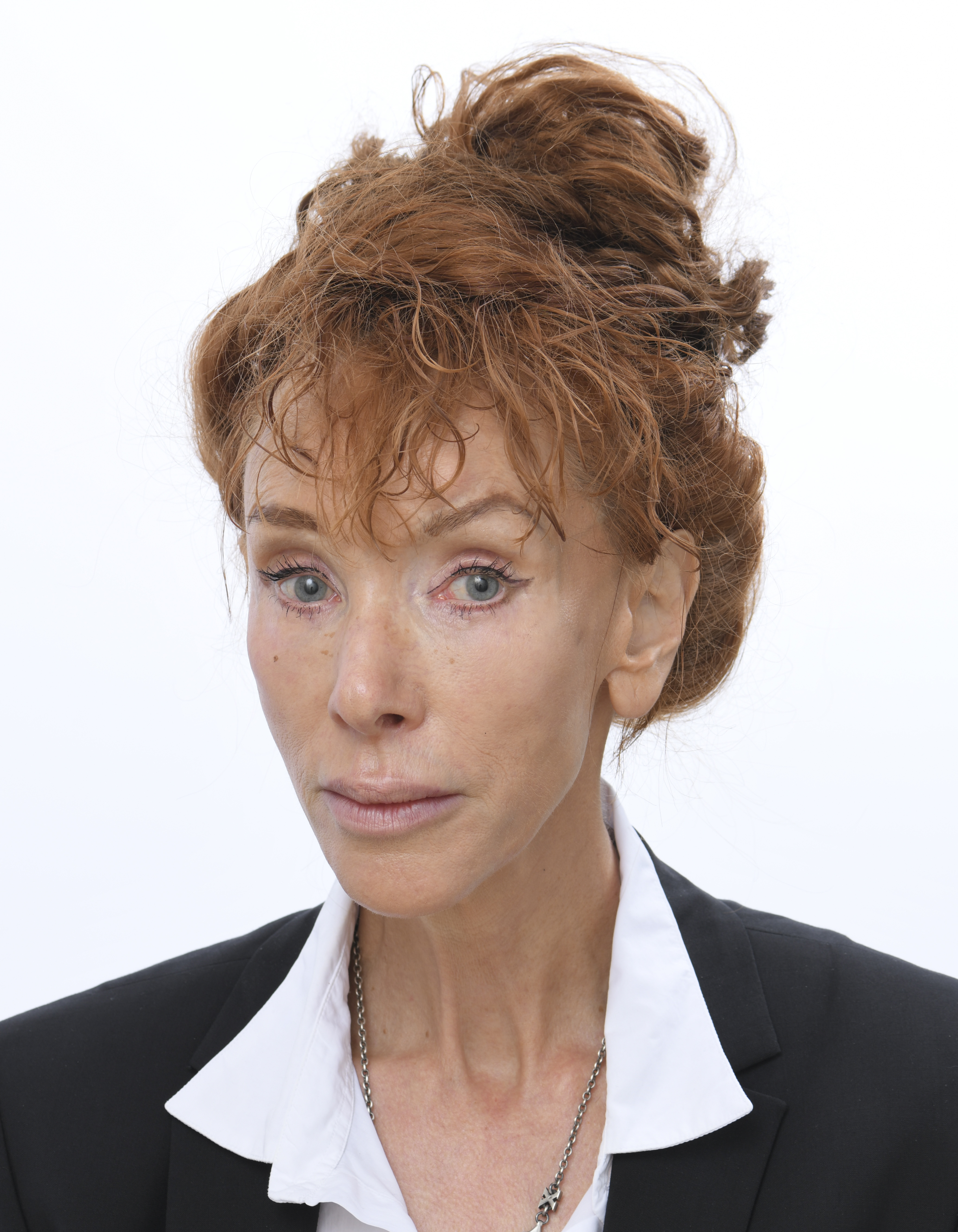
- Official portrait, 2024

Member of the European Parliament for Germany
- Incumbent
- Assumed office 16 July 2024

Personal details
- Born: 2 June 1962 (age 64) Weimar, East Germany
- Party: Die PARTEI
- Education: University of Hamburg
- Writing career
- Language: German
- Years active: 1997–present
- Genres: plays; social criticism; LGBT literature; poetry
- Notable work: GRM. Brainfuck (2019)
- Notable awards: Else Lasker-Schüler Dramatist Prize; Swiss Book Prize; Bertolt Brecht Literature Prize

Sibylle Berg (born 2 June 1962) is a German-Swiss contemporary author, playwright, and member of the European Parliament. They write novels, essays, short fiction, plays, radio plays, and columns. Their 18 books have been translated into 30 languages. They have won numerous awards, including the Thüringer Literaturpreis, the Bertolt-Brecht-Literaturpreis, and the Johann-Peter-Hebel-Preis. They have become an iconic figure in German alternative sub-cultures, gaining a large fan base among the LGBT community and the European artistic communities. They live in Switzerland and Israel. Their 2019 work GRM. Brainfuck, a science fiction novel set in a dystopian near future won the Swiss Book Prize and was noticed by The Washington Post. It reached fourth place on the Spiegel Bestseller list, with the sequel, RCE, entering the list as highest entry of the week at place 14. On 1 March 2023 Berg was invited as special guest to open the high-profile Elevate Festival in Graz, Austria.

== Life ==
Berg was born on 2 June 1962 in Weimar, East Germany. They spent their childhood and youth in Constanta, Romania. Their father was a music professor, and their mother was a librarian. Before beginning their higher education in West Germany, they were trained as a combat diver. They studied oceanography at the University of Hamburg, and worked various jobs. In 1996, they moved to Zürich, Switzerland. Berg married in 2004, and has held Swiss citizenship since 2012. Berg is known to support the Straight Edge movement. Berg describes themself as non-binary.

In 2023 an article in the Neue Zürcher Zeitung put big parts of Berg's biographical details into question.

On 25 September 2023 it was announced that Berg will be competing in the election for the European Parliament in June 2024 for Die PARTEI.

In the 2024 European Parliament election, Berg was elected together with Martin Sonneborn. Berg holds German and Swiss citizenship.

== Novelist ==
Berg's first novel, A Few People Search for Happiness and Laugh Themselves to Death, was published in 1997 by Reclam Publishing, after previously being rejected by 50 other publishers.

As of 2024, Berg has written 18 novels. To promote their newly released books, Berg goes on tour, with the 2012 release of Vielen Dank für das Leben (Thank You For This Life) including contributions from film and theater actors Katia Riemann, Mathias Brandt, and musician Mary Ocher, and the release of GRM: brainfuck featured the grime rappers T.Roadz, and Prince Rapid and Slix of Ruff Sqwad.

== Playwright ==
Berg has written 32 plays. In 2000, in Bochum, their second play Helges Leben (Helge's Life) was staged and commissioned for the Mulheim Theater Festival.

In 2008, the play Von denen die überleben (Of Those Who Survive) was staged in the central theater of Zürich, in collaboration with well-known artists such as Jon Pylypchuk, Gabríela Friðriksdóttir, and more.

In 2013, Berg began working with Maxim Gorki Theater in Berlin, and their first play, Es sagt mir nichts, das sogenannte Draussen (The so-called outside means nothing to me), was selected in 2014 as the play of the year by Theater heute.

In 2015, the play Und dann kam Mirna (And Then Came Mirna) won the Friedrich Luft Prize as the best production in Berlin and Potsdam.

In 2019, the play Wonderland Ave was invited to the "Mülheim Theatertage".

In 2019, the play Hate Triptych – Ways out of the crisis (Hass-Triptychon – Wege aus der Krise) won the Nestroypreis as the best play of the year in German-speaking countries.

Berg's plays have been staged and aired in the United States, Britain, Italy, France, Spain, Poland, Lithuania, the Czech Republic, Slovenia, Hungary, Turkey, Denmark, Sweden, Norway, the Netherlands, Romania, and Bulgaria.

== Social activism ==
Berg has long been a social activist. In 2018, they launched a referendum against insurance companies monitoring individual insurers without the requirement for a court order. They support the referendum E-ID, against privatization of a digital passport project into private businesses. In 2019, in response to man-dominated historiography, together with other women and non-binary people, they published The Canon for the Visibility of Women in Science Art and Literature.

Berg is active in science education. Their interviews with experts in various disciplines were published in the Swiss magazine Republik, and then in book form under the title Nerds retten die Welt ("Nerds save the world").

They support the Charter of Digital Fundamental Rights of the European Union, published at the end of November 2016, and is a regular guest at the Re:publica conference.

== Other projects ==
Berg has written various contributions for Die Zeit, the Neue Zürcher Zeitung, and Die Presse, among others. They have also been a columnist for Spiegel Online since January 2011, under the title "S.P.O.N. – Fragen Sie Frau Sibylle" (Ask Ms. Sibylle), published weekly until March 2018, and bi-weekly since then. The column has more than 4 million followers. Berg also conducts a regular interview series for the Swiss online magazine Republik, entitled "Nerds Save The World", in which they speak to specialists from various disciplines. In 2020, a book named Nerds Save the World that unites all conversations was published by Kiepenheuer & Witsch.

Berg has written songs to their own plays, as well as to other artists, like the lyrics for several songs by the Swiss singer Sina. In 2011, the song "Ich Schwvara", written by Berg and sang by Sina, was the song of the year and the most-played song at weddings in Switzerland. Berg wrote the text "Speed" for Phillip Boa and the Voodooclub. Along with Rammstein and Element of Crime, Phillip Boa and the Voodooclub can be heard on the recorded reading of Berg's novel Sex II (1999). From January 2016 to December 2017, Berg read their own satirical texts off-air ahead of the introduction of guests on the ZDFneo talk show Schulz & Böhmermann.

== Director ==
In March 2013, Berg co-directed, with Hasko Weber, Angst Reist Mit (Fear Travels With Us) at the Stuttgart Theater. That same year, The Berliner Festspiele honored them in "A Day with Sibylle Berg", where they directed a day-long event (including 60 well-known artists, some personal friends, others collaborators). In October 2015, they directed their play, How to Sell a Murder House, at the Neumarkt Zurch Theater.

== Educational canon ==
In 2018, Berg collaborated with Simone Meier, Hedwig Richter, Margarete Stokowski, and seven others to produce the list "Women You Need to Know", published in August by Spiegel Online and Watson.ch. The canon includes 145 women and three female artist groups, sub-divided into science, technology, research, as well as politics, literature, and art.

== Teaching work ==
Berg has been teaching dramaturgy at the Zurich University of the Arts since 2013.

== Works translated into English ==
- By the Way, Did I Ever Tell You. Editor Raphael Gygax, Distributed Art Pub Incorporated, 2007, ISBN 978-3-905770-77-3
- AND NOW: THE WORLD!. Directed by Abigail Graham, Hackney Showroom London, 2015.
- Wonderland Avenue, commissioned by Frieze Projects for Frieze Arts Fair 2016. Directed by Sebastian Nuebling, set built by German artist Claus Richter.
- Grime [GRM Brainfuck], trans. Tim Mohr, St. Martin's Griffin, 2022. ISBN 978-1-250-79651-6.

== Works translated into French ==
- Chercher le bonheur et crever de rire ["Ein paar Leute suchen das Glück und lachen sich tot"], trans. by Maryvonne Litaize and Yasmin Hoffmann, Nîmes, France, Éditions Jacqueline Chambon, coll. "Métro", 2000, 206 pp. ISBN 978-2-87711-213-0
- Amerika ["Amerika"], trans. by Maryvonne Litaize and Jacqueline Chambon, Nîmes, France, Éditions Jacqueline Chambon, coll. " Métro ", 2001, 267 p. ISBN 978-2-87711-228-4
- La Mauvaise Nouvelle d'abord. Des histoires d'hommes : nouvelles ["Das unerfreuliche Zuerst. Herrengeschichten"], trans. by Maryvonne Litaize and Yasmin Hoffmann, Nîmes, France, Éditions Jacqueline Chambon, coll. "Métro", 2003, 150 p. ISBN 978-2-87711-258-1
- La Vie de Martin ["Helges Leben"], trans. by Pascal Paul-Harang, Paris, Éditions Climats, 2004, 75 p. ISBN 978-2-84158-252-5
- Herr Mautz ["Herr Mautz"], trans. by Silvia Berutti-Ronelt and Laurent Hatat, Toulouse, France, Presses Universitaires du Mirail, coll. "Nouvelles scènes", 2004, 73 p. ISBN 978-2-85816-729-6
- Chien, femme, homme ["Hund, Frau, Mann"], trans. by Pascal Paul-Harang, Paris, L'Arche Éditeur, coll. "Scène ouverte", 2012, 41 p. ISBN 978-2-85181-780-8L'Arche éditeur
- Merci bien pour la vie ["Vielen Dank für das Leben"], trans. by Rose Labourie, Arles, France, Actes Sud, 2015, 352 pp. ISBN 978-2-330-05304-8

== Awards ==
- 2000: Marburg Literature prize for Amerika
- 2006/2007: Stipendium Landis & Gyr Foundation
- 2008: Wolfgang Koeppen Prize
- 2012: City of Zürich prize
- 2014: Play of the year of the magazine Theater heute for Es sagt mir nichts, das so genannte Draußen (The So-Called Outside Means Nothing To Me)
- 2015: Friedrich Luft Prize for Und dann kam Mirna (And Then Came Mirna)
- 2016: Audience Prize Plays. Mülheimer Theatertage NRW for Und dann kam Mirna (And Then Came Mirna) at the Maxim Gorki Theatre in Berlin
- 2016: Else Lasker-Schüler Dramatist Prize
- 2017: City of Zürich prize
- 2019: Kassel Literary Prize
- 2019: Thüringer Literaturpreis
- 2019: Nestroy Theatre Prize – The author prize for the best theater play
- 2019: Swiss Book Prize for GRM. Brainfuck
- 2020: Swiss Grand Prix Literatur Prize
- 2020: Bertolt Brecht Literature Prize
- 2020: Johann-Peter-Hebel-Preis (Presentation in May 2021)
- 2021: "Play of the Year" in Theater heute's critics' poll: And surely the world has disappeared with me
- 2022: Dreitannen Literaturpreis

== Bibliography ==
=== Prose ===
- A Few People Search For Happiness And Laugh Themselves To Death / Ein paar Leute suchen das Glück und lachen sich tot. Roman. Reclam, Leipzig 1997; Reclam, Stuttgart 2008, ISBN 978-3-15-021577-7.
- Sex II. Roman. Reclam, Leipzig 1998; Reclam, Stuttgart 2009, ISBN 978-3-15-021665-1.
- Amerika. Roman. Hoffmann und Campe, Hamburg 1999; Goldmann, München 2001, ISBN 978-3-442-44848-7
- Gold. Hoffmann und Campe, Hamburg 2000; erw. Taschenbuchausgabe: Kiepenheuer & Witsch, Köln 2002, ISBN 978-3-462-03098-3.
- Das Unerfreuliche zuerst. Herrengeschichten. Kiepenheuer & Witsch, Köln 2001, ISBN 978-3-462-03037-2.
- End Happy / Ende gut. Roman. Kiepenheuer & Witsch, Köln 2004; Rowohlt Verlag, Reinbek 2005, ISBN 978-3-499-23858-1.
- Did I Ever Tell You... A Fairy Tale For Everyone / Habe ich dir eigentlich schon erzählt... – Ein Märchen für alle. Illustriert von Rita Ackermann und Andro Wekua. Kiepenheuer & Witsch, Köln 2006, ISBN 978-3-462-03735-7.
- The Journey / Die Fahrt. Roman. Kiepenheuer & Witsch, Köln 2007; Rowohlt, Reinbek 2009, ISBN 978-3-499-24775-0.
- The Man Sleeps / Der Mann schläft. Roman. Hanser, München 2009; dtv, München 2011, ISBN 978-3-423-14002-7.
- Thank You For This Life / Vielen Dank für das Leben. Roman. Hanser, München 2012, ISBN 978-3-446-23970-8.
- How Am I Supposed To Stand All This? / Wie halte ich das nur alles aus? Fragen Sie Frau Sibylle. Hanser, München 2013, ISBN 978-3-446-24322-4.
- The Day My Wife Found A Husband / Der Tag, als meine Frau einen Mann fand. Hanser, München 2015,ISBN 978-3-446-24760-4
- Wonderful years. When we were still traveling the world / Wunderbare Jahre. Als wir noch die Welt bereisten. Hanser, München 2016, ISBN 978-3-446-25408-4.
- GRM. Brainfuck. Kiepenheuer & Witsch, Köln 2019, ISBN 978-3-462-05143-8
- Nerds retten die Welt. Kiepenheuer & Witsch, Köln 2020, ISBN 978-3-462-05460-6.
- RCE. #RemoteCodeExecution Kiepenheuer & Witsch, Köln 2022, ISBN 978-3-462-00164-8.
- My rather strange friend Walter. S. Fischer Verlage, Berlin 2024, ISBN 978-3-7373-7257-2.
- Try Praying. Kiepenheuer & Witsch, Köln 2024, ISBN 978-3-462-00648-3.
- PNR: La Bella Vita. Kiepenheuer & Witsch, Köln 2025,

=== Theater ===
- A Few People Search For Happiness And Laugh Themselves To Death / Ein paar Leute suchen das Glück und lachen sich tot. (1999)
- Victor's Life / Helges Leben (2000)
- Dog, Woman, Man / Hund, Frau, Mann (2001)
- Herr Mautz (2002)
- Eine Stunde Glück (2003)
- Look, The Sun Is Going Down / Schau, da geht die Sonne unter (2003)
- It'll Be Alright. Never Love Again! / Das wird schon. Nie mehr Lieben! (2004)
- Make A Wish / Wünsch dir was. Ein Musical (2006)
- Did I actually tell you...? / Habe ich dir eigentlich schon erzählt..., 2 October 2007 Deutsches Theater in Göttingen. Director: Katja Fillmann (2007)
- Of Those Who Will Survive /Von denen, die überleben (2008)
- The Final Golden Years / Die goldenen letzten Jahre (2009)
- Only At Night / Nur nachts (2010)
- The Main Thing Is Work! / Hauptsache Arbeit! (2010)
- Missions Of Beauty / Missionen der Schönheit (2010)
- Don't Spoil The Surprise! / Lasst euch überraschen (2010)
- The Ladies Are Waiting / Die Damen warten (2012)
- Fear Travels With Us / Angst reist mit (2013, Berg's debut as stage director)
- Es sagt mir nichts, das sogenannte Draußen (2013)
- My Slightly Strange Friend Walter / Mein ziemlich seltsamer Freund Walter (2014)
- Good Cooking / Viel gut essen, von Frau Berg (2014)
- And Now: The World! / Und jetzt: Die Welt! (2015)
- And Then Came Mirna / Und dann kam Mirna (2015)
- How To Sell A Murder House (2015)
- After us the universe or the inner team knows no break/ Nach uns das All oder Das innere Team kennt keine Pause. 15 September 2017 Maxim Gorki Theater, Berlin. Director: Sebastian Nübling (2017)
- Wonderland Ave., at: Schauspiel Köln, 8 June 2018; Director: Ersan Mondtag (2018)
- Hate Triptych – Ways out of the crisis / Hass-Triptychon — Wege aus der Krise. Director: Ersan Mondtag (2019)
- In the gardens / In den Gärten, 16 November 2019 Theater Basel (Director: Miloš Lolić) (2019)
- And surely the world disappeared with me / Und sicher ist mit mir die Welt verschwunden, 24 October 2020 Maxim Gorki Theater, Berlin. Director: Sebastian Nübling (2020)
- GRM Brainfuck ( based on the 2019 novel of the same name). A musical. 10 September 2021 premier at Thalia Theater. Director: Sebastian Nübling. Editing: Sibylle Berg (2021)
- It can only get better / Es kann doch nur noch besser werden. 21 September 2023 premier at the Berliner Ensemble. Director: Max Lindemann.
- RCE #RemoteCodeExecution , at: Berliner Ensemble, 25. April 2024. Director: Kay Voges.
- Toto or Thank You For This Life( based on the 2012 novel Thank You For This Life). 24 October 2024 premier at Burgtheater Wien. Director: Ersan Mondtag
- A little light. And that calm. , 26.09.2025 at Schauspiel Hannover (directed by Lena Brasch)

=== Radio plays ===
- Sex II shortend reading of Sibylle Berg, with music of Phillip Boa, Rammstein, Element of Crime, u. a. Reclam, Leipzig 1999.
- Amerika, shortend reading of Sibylle Berg, Hoffmann und Campe, Hamburg 1999.
- Gold shortend reading of Sibylle Berg, Hoffmann und Campe, Hamburg 2000.
- Sex II, director: Stefan Hardt and Inga Busch and Beate Jensen (SWR). 2000.
- Ein paar Leute suchen das Glück und lachen sich tot, director: Beate Andres. voice: Sophie Rois, Dagmar Sitte, Christian Berkel u. a. (NDR/HR), Munich 2003
- Ende gut, Hörspiel, director: Claudia Johanna Leist, composer: Caspar Brötzmann (WDR). 2005.
- Das wird schon. Nie mehr lieben!, adaptation: Wolfgang Stahl, director: Sven Stricker, voice: Leslie Malton, Stefanie Stappenbeck, Daniela Ziegler, Andreas Fröhlich (NDR) radio play of the month Juli. 2006.
- Hongkong Airport, 23.45 h. director: Claudia Johanna Leist, voice: Christian Redl, Angelika Bartsch, Anna Thalbach, u. a. (WDR) 2007.
- Der Mann schläft. director: Leonhard Koppelmann, composer: Gerd Bessler, voice: Judith Engel, Leonie Landa, Markus John, Jens Harzer, Achim Buch, Marion Breckwoldt, Christian Redl (NDR) 2010.
- Vielen Dank für das Leben, shortend reading of Gustav Peter Wöhler, 5 CD, 397 minutes. radio play Hamburg, Hamburg 2012.
- Und jetzt: die Welt! Oder: Es sagt mir nichts, das sogenannte Draußen., director: Stefan Kanis, voice: Marina Frenk (MDR) 2015.
- GRM Brainfuck. voices: Torben Kessler, Lisa Hrdina. 2019 Argon Verlag GmbH, Berlin
