= Peter Stamm =

Swiss writer (born 1963)

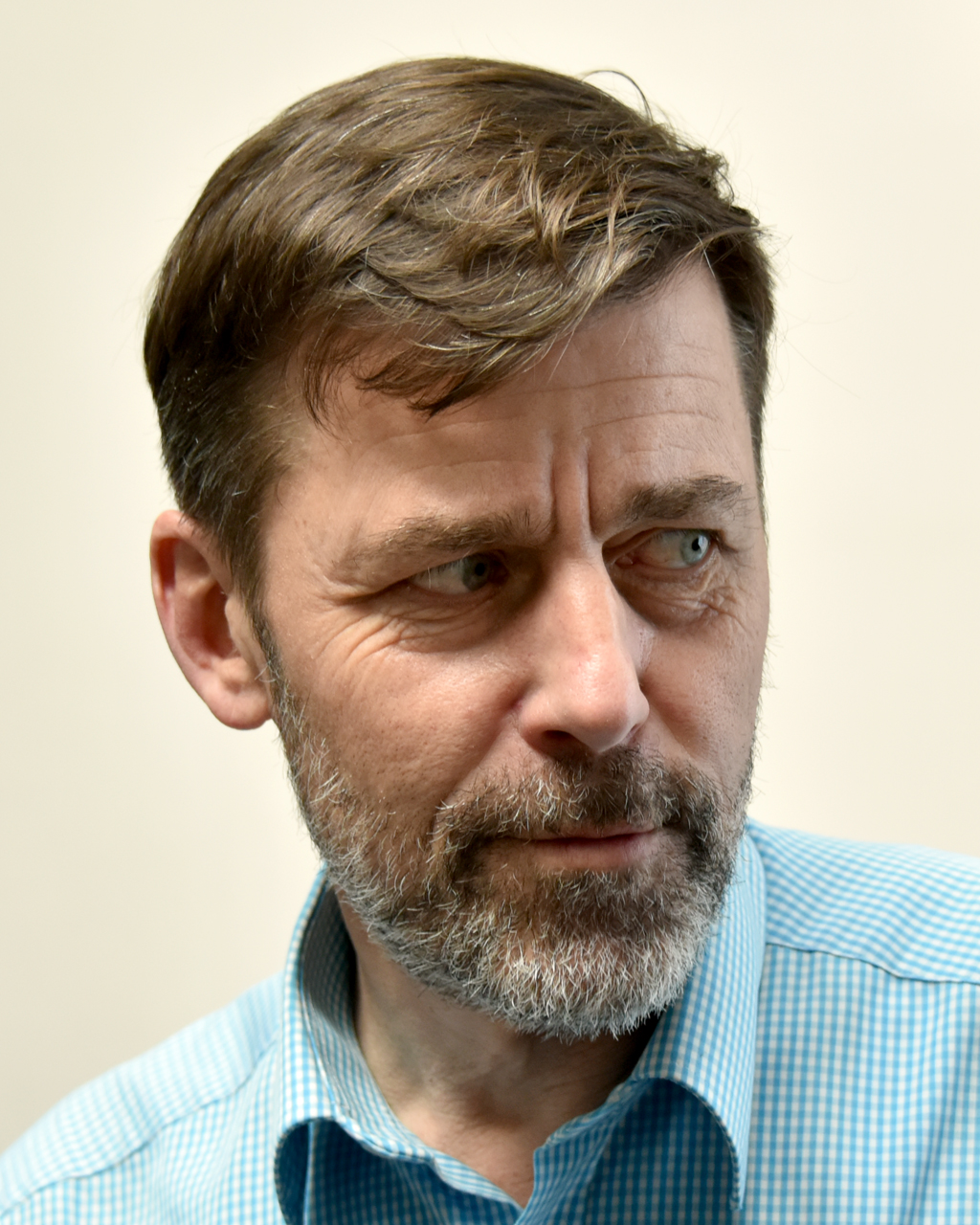
Peter Stamm (2019)

Peter Stamm (born 18 January 1963 in Münsterlingen) is a Swiss writer. His prize-winning books have been translated into more than thirty languages. For his entire body of work and his accomplishments in fiction, he was nominated for the International Booker Prize in 2013, and in 2014 he won the prestigious Friedrich Hölderlin Prize.

== Life ==
Peter Stamm grew up in Weinfelden in the canton of Thurgau the son of an accountant. After completing primary and secondary school he spent three years as an apprentice accountant and then five as an accountant. He then chose to go back to school at the University of Zurich taking courses in a variety of fields including English studies, Business informatics, Psychology, and Psychopathology. During this time he also worked as an intern at a psychiatric clinic. After living for a time in New York, Paris, and Scandinavia he settled down in 1990 as a writer and freelance journalist in Zurich. He wrote articles for, among others, the Neue Zürcher Zeitung, the Tages-Anzeiger, Die Weltwoche, and the satirical newspaper Nebelspalter. Since 1997 he has belonged to the editorial staff of the quarterly literary magazine "Entwürfe für Literatur." He lives in Winterthur.

Peter Stamm has written prose, radio drama, and plays. He is most known for his cool and sparse writing style. Since 2003 Stamm has been a member of the group "Autorinnen und Autoren der Schweiz" (Authors of Switzerland).

In the fall term 2018 Peter Stamm was the tenth Friedrich Dürrenmatt Guest Professor for World Literature at the University of Bern.

== Prizes ==
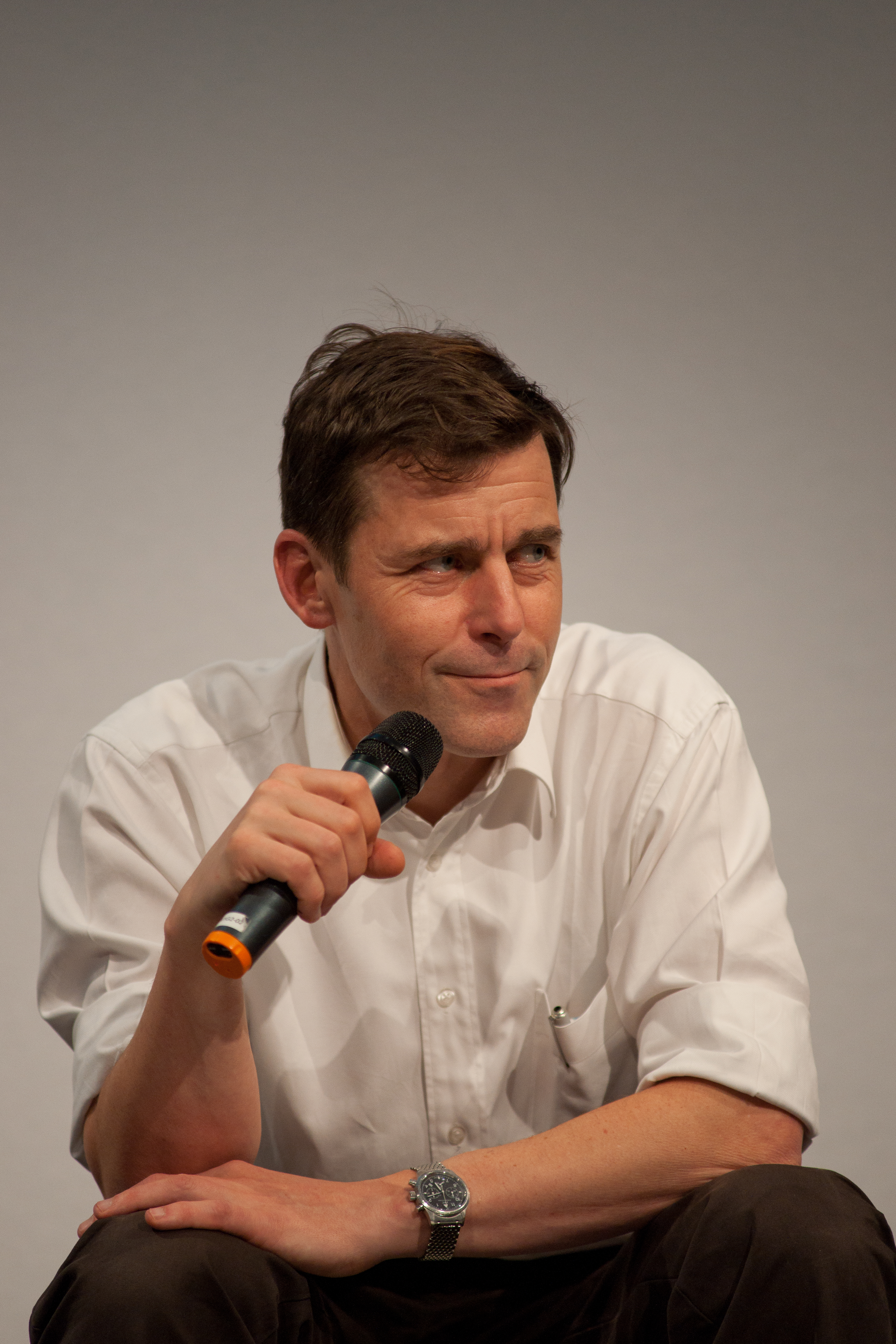
Peter Stamm (Geneva, 2012)

Stamm has received a number of literature prizes.

- 1998: Ehrengabe des Kantons Zürich
- 1999: Rauris Literature Prize
- 2000: Rheingau Literatur Preis
- 2001: Ehrengabe der Stadt Zürich
- 2002: Preis der Schweizerischen Schillerstiftung
- 2002: Carl-Heinrich-Ernst-Kunstpreis
- 2013: Frank O'Connor International Short Story Award shortlist We're Flying
- 2014: Friedrich-Hölderlin-Preis of the town of Bad Homburg
- 2017: Schiller Prize of the Zürcher Kantonalbank
- 2017: Johann-Friedrich-von-Cotta-Literatur- und Übersetzerpreis der Landeshauptstadt Stuttgart for Weit über das Land
- 2018: Solothurner Literaturpreis
- 2018: Heinrich-Heine guest lectureship
- 2018: Swiss Book Prize for Die sanfte Gleichgültigkeit der Welt
- 2024: IBBY Honour List for Theo und Marlen auf der Insel

== Works ==
=== Prose ===
- Alles über den Mann, 1995 (with Brigitte Fries)
- Gotthard, 1997 (with Markus Bühler)
- Agnes, 1998 (translated by Michael Hofmann as Agnes, Other Press, 2016)
- Blitzeis, 1999 (translated by Michael Hofmann as "Black Ice" in the first section of In Strange Gardens, Other Press, 2006)
- Ungefähre Landschaft, 2001 (translated by Michael Hofmann as Unformed Landscape, Other Press, 2005)
- In fremden Gärten, 2003 (translated by Michael Hofmann in the second section of In Strange Gardens, Other Press, 2006)
- Warum wir vor der Stadt wohnen, 2005 (with Jutta Bauer)
- An einem Tag wie diesem, 2006 (translated by Michael Hofmann as On a Day Like This, Other Press, 2008)
- Wir fliegen, 2008 (translated by Michael Hofmann in the first section of We're Flying, Other Press, 2012)
- Sieben Jahre, 2009 (translated by Michael Hofmann as Seven Years, Other Press, 2011)
- Seerücken, 2011 (translated by Michael Hofmann as "The Ridge" in the second section of We're Flying, Other Press, 2012)
- Nacht ist der Tag, 2013 (translated by Michael Hofmann as All Days are Night, Other Press, 2014)
- Weit über das Land, 2016 (translated by Michael Hofmann as To the Back of Beyond, Other Press, 2017)
- Die sanfte Gleichgültigkeit der Welt, 2018 (translated by Michael Hofmann as The Sweet Indifference of the World, Other Press, 2020)
- Das Archiv der Gefühle, novel, S. Fischer, Frankfurt, 2021
- In einer dunkelblauen Stunde, novel, S. Fischer, Frankfurt, 2023
- Otto von Irgendwas, children's book, Atlantis Kinderbuch 2024

=== Plays ===
- Die Planung des Planes Monologue, Schauspielhaus Zürich
- Fremd gehen, Theater 1230, Bern 1995
- Après Soleil oder Wen der Wind zur Insel trägt, Theater Saarbrücken 2002
- Der Kuss des Kohaku, Schauspielhaus Hamburg 2004
- Die Töchter von Taubenhain, Theater Osnabrück 2004

=== Radio dramas ===
- Ich und die anderen 1991
- Die Nacht der Gewohnheiten 1993
- In Vitro Zürich 1994
- Der letzte Autofahrer 1995
- Bildnis eines Knaben mit Peitsche 1995

=== Editor ===
- Diensttage, 2003

=== Translations ===
- Susan Musgrave: Träum dir eine Badewanne (English: Dreams are More Real than Bathtubs), 2002

== In translation ==
Several of Stamm's works have been translated into English by Michael Hofmann, and published in the United States by Other Press. These include novels Seven Years, Agnes, Unformed Landscape, and On a Day Like This, as well as In Strange Gardens and Other Stories, a collection of short stories.
