= Bertolt-Brecht-Literaturpreis =

German literary award

Bertolt-Brecht-Literaturpreis (English: "Bertolt Brecht Literature Prize") is a literary award in Augsburg, Germany, birthplace of Bertolt Brecht. It has been awarded every three years since 1995. With a prize of €15,000, it is considered one of the most prestigious literary awards in Germany. It is awarded to writers and personalities "who have distinguished themselves through the critical analysis of the present day in their literary works." The 2006 edition marked the 50th anniversary of the death of Brecht.

== Award winners ==
Year	Recipient
1995	Franz Xaver Kroetz
1998	Robert Gernhardt
2001	Urs Widmer
2004	Christoph Ransmayr
2006	Dea Loher
2010	Albert Ostermaier
2013	Ingo Schulze
2016	Silke Scheuermann
2018	Nino Haratischwili
2020	Sibylle Berg
2023	Lutz Seiler
2026	Emine Sevgi Özdamar
