= Ingo Schulze =

German writer

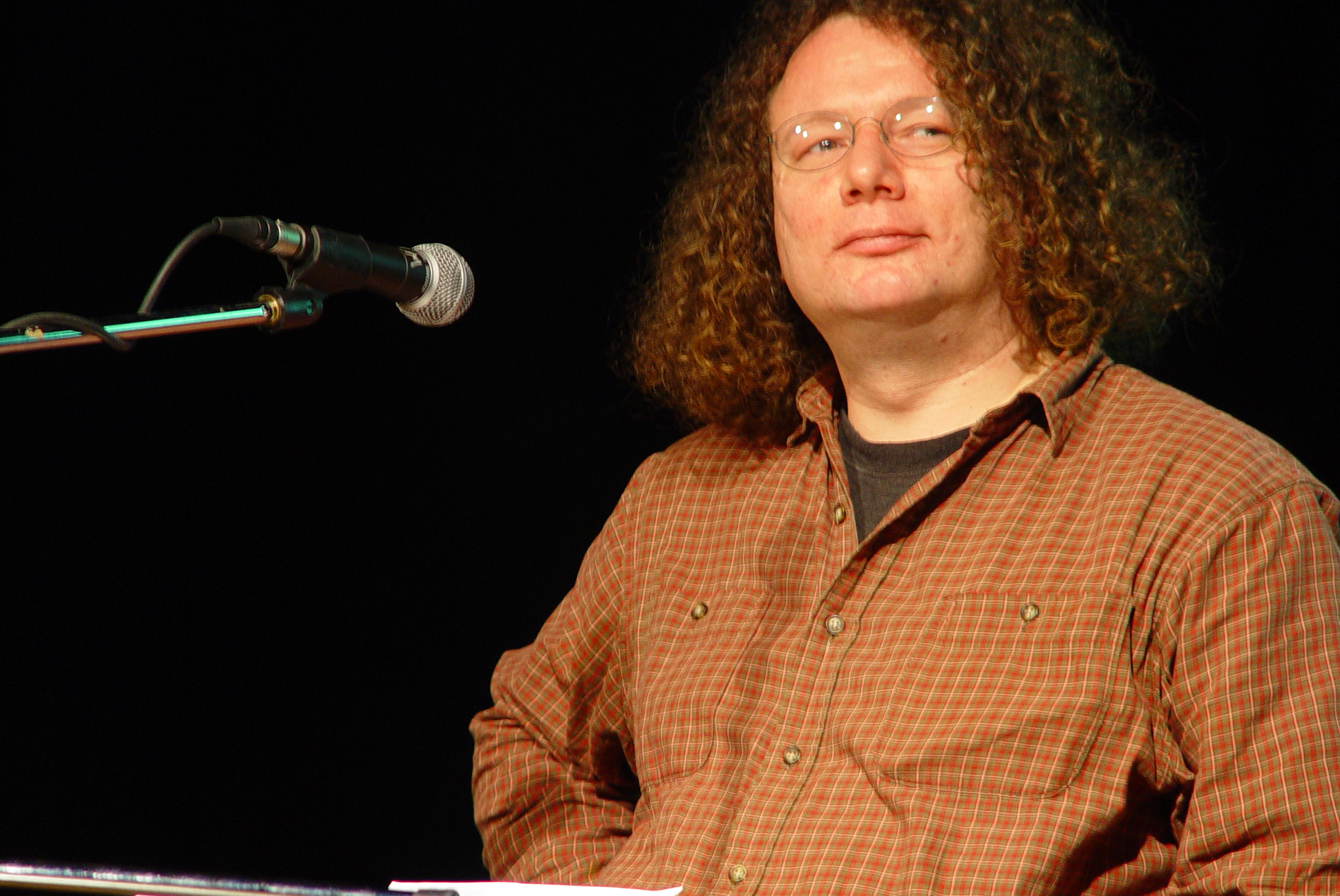
Ingo Schulze (2004)

Ingo Schulze (born 15 December 1962) is a German writer born in Dresden in former East Germany. He studied classical philology at the University of Jena for five years, and, until German reunification, was an assistant director (dramatic arts advisor) at the State Theatre in Altenburg 45 km south of Leipzig for two years. After sleeping through the events of the night of 9 November 1989, Schulze started a newspaper with friends. He was encouraged to write. Schulze spent six months in St Petersburg which became the basis for his debut collection of short stories 33 Moments of Happiness (1995).

Schulze has won a number of awards for his novels and stories, which have been translated into twenty languages, among them into English by John E. Woods. In 2007, he was awarded the Thüringer Literaturpreis. In 2013 he was awarded the Bertolt-Brecht-Literaturpreis.

== Life ==
Schulze, the son of a physicist and a doctor, grew up with his mother after his parents' divorce. After completing his Abitur, which he took in 1981 at the Kreuzschule in Dresden, he completed basic military service in the National People's Army. Until 1988 he studied classical philology at the Friedrich-Schiller University of Jena.

Subsequently, Schulze was a dramaturg at the Landestheater of Altenburg, which he left in order to work as a journalist. In 1990 he was a cofounder of the 'independent newspaper' the Alternburger Wochenblatt, which was operational until Autumn 1991, as well as an Offertenblatt (a kind of newspaper for classified ads) called the Anzeiger. Both were published by the Alternburg publishing house, which was managed by Schulze until the end of 1992. In early 1993 he went to Russia, where he launched the advertising newspaper Привет Петербург (Privet Petersburg).

Since the mid-1990s Schulze has lived as a freelance author in Berlin. He and his wife have two daughters.

Since 2006 he has been a member of the Berlin Academy of the Arts and, since 2007, of the German Academy for Language and Poetry in Darmstadt. He is also a member of the Saxony Academy of the Arts and the PEN Centre Germany.

In Autumn 2019 Schulze curated the forum:autoren at the Munich Literature Festival. The theme was titled 'Exercises in paradise. Questions to the world after 1989.'

== Creative Work ==
Schulze drew on his experiences in Saint Petersburg for his first book publication. The stories in 33 Moments of Happiness (1995) are set in the Russian metropolis. Schulze uses a literary device in which he attributes his texts to a journalist from Germany with a literary background, who disappeared in Saint Petersburg. The collection of stories was received positively by most critics. His Simple Storys (1998) are set in Altenburg, Thuringia, where Schulze had lived and worked; focusing on the consequences of Germany's reunification on the lives of his characters, whose portrayal was said to be devoid of any “post-reunification sentimentality.” The text was characterized by a style that reviewers described as ruthless and precise, which the author himself described as “this short story tone [that] made things easier.” After the work was published, German author and Nobel Prize winner Günter Grass praised Schulze as one of the “great storytellers” of the new federal states.

After publishing several short stories, his next novel, Neue Leben (New Lives), did not follow until 2005. It tells the story of the author and newspaper editor Enrico Türmer, who writes to a friend, his sister, and a lover in the year of German reunification. Schulze once again retreats into the position of an editor who merely edited the letters that make up the novel, thus making use of a literary device typical of 18th-century epistolary novels. This revival was not unanimously welcomed by critics. While critic Richard Kämmerlings of the German newspaper Frankfurter Allgemeine Zeitung asked, “Could it be any more old-fashioned?”, Jörg Magenau of Die Tageszeitung saw this connection as the “real highlight of the novel.” Some reviewers, not always without irony, classified the work as the long-awaited “ultimate reunification novel.”

On the occasion of the 800th anniversary of his native city of Dresden, Ingo Schulze wrote an essay for the German public broadcaster Mitteldeutscher Rundfunk on the subject of “The Myth of Dresden” entitled Nachtgedanken (Night Thoughts), which was broadcast on 3 May 2006. Schulze also participated in the exhibition Mythos Dresden at the German Hygiene Museum in Dresden.

Schulze's collection of short stories Handy. 13 Geschichten in alter Manier (Cell Phone: 13 Stories in the Old Style), which hit stores in 2007, received almost unanimous praise. German writer and critic Volker Weidermann, for example, reviewed it in the German newspaper Frankfurter Allgemeine Sonntagszeitung, comparing it to Neue Leben (New Lives) as “more casual, simpler, calmer, and simply very, very beautifully written.”

Schulze's 2007 acceptance speech at the German literary prize Thüringer Literaturpreis award ceremony, in which he addressed the increasing importance of sponsorship in the cultural sector and the simultaneous withdrawal of the state from this area, also attracted widespread attention in the national media.

Schulze's novel Adam und Evelyn, whose protagonists leave the East Germany via Hungary in late autumn 1989, was nominated for the 2008 German Book Prize alongside five other finalists. In 2018, the novel was adapted into a film of the same title by German filmmaker Andreas Goldstein.

Schulze's 2010 collection of short stories, Orangen und Engel. Italienische Skizzen (Oranges and Angels: Italian Sketches), was written during the author's scholarship stay at the Villa Massimo in Rome. These stories mostly focus on ordinary people from the metropolitan environment of Rome; the stories are presented as the author's actual experiences and are told in the first person; however, they then almost imperceptibly depart from this autobiographical pattern, become enigmatic, and usually have an ambiguous ending.

== Political Statements ==
In early 2012, Ingo Schulze's Theses Against The Plundering of Society, published in the German newspaper Süddeutsche Zeitung, and his Dresden speech Against Market-Conform Democracy attracted a great deal of attention.

After the 2013 German federal election, he was the initiator and one of the first signatories of the appeal Against the Grand Coalition, which called on the Social Democratic Party of Germany (SPD) not to enter into another coalition government with the Christian Democratic Union of Germany and the Christian Social Union in Bavaria, but to form a majority government led by the SPD with The Greens and Die Linke. He is a member of a goup called Neubeginn (New Beginning).

== Awards ==
- 1995 Alfred-Döblin-Förderpreis
- 1995 Ernst-Willner-Preis beim Ingeborg-Bachmann-Wettbewerb
- 1995 Aspekte-Literaturpreis
- 1998 Johannes-Bobrowski-Medaille
- 2001 Joseph-Breitbach-Preis (gemeinsam mit Dieter Wellershoff und Thomas Hürlimann)
- 2006 Finalist für den Deutschen Buchpreis: Neue Leben
- 2006 Peter-Weiss-Preis
- 2007 Thüringer Literaturpreis
- 2007 Preis der Leipziger Buchmesse
- 2008 Premio Grinzane Cavour
- 2008 Samuel-Bogumil-Linde-Preis
- 2008 Finalist of Deutscher Buchpreis: Adam und Evelyn
- 2009 Longlist of the International IMPAC Dublin Literary Award
- 2011 Mainzer Stadtschreiber
- 2012 Literaturpreis des Freien Deutschen Autorenverbands (FDA)
- 2013 Bertolt-Brecht-Literaturpreis
- 2013 Manhae-Preis
- 2014 Radio play of the month October by the Deutsche Akademie der Darstellenden Künste for "Das Deutschlandgerät"
- 2017 Rheingau Literatur Preis
- 2019 Werner-Bergengruen-Preis
- 2020 Officer's Cross of the Order of Merit of the Federal Republic of Germany
- 2021 Preis der Literaturhäuser
- 2021 Kunstpreis der Landeshauptstadt Dresden
- 2025 Ten-week London scholarship from the German Literature Fund, as Writer-in-Residence at Queen Mary University of London
- 2026 Uwe Johnson Prize

== Publications ==
- 33 Augenblicke des Glücks, Berlin 1995 ("33 Moments of Happiness") ISBN 978-3-8270-0050-7
- Simple Storys, Berlin 1998 [German text under an English heading] ISBN 978-3-423-12702-8
- Der Brief meiner Wirtin, Ludwigsburg 2000
- Von Nasen, Faxen und Ariadnefäden, Berlin 2000 ISBN 978-3-932109-16-4
- Mr. Neitherkorn und das Schicksal, Berlin 2001 ISBN 3-926433-25-6
- Würde ich nicht lesen, würde ich auch nicht schreiben, Lichtenfels 2002
- Neue Leben, Berlin 2005 ISBN 978-3-8270-0052-1
- Handy. Dreizehn Storys in alter Manier, Berlin 2007 ISBN 978-3-8270-0720-9
- Adam und Evelyn, Berlin 2008. ISBN 978-3-8270-0810-7
- One More Story: Thirteen Stories in the Time-Honored Mode, 2010 ISBN 978-0-307-27104-4
- Peter Holtz: sein glückliches Leben erzählt von ihm selbst, 2017 ISBN 978-3-10-397204-7
- Die rechtschaffenen Mörder, 2020 ISBN 978-3-10-390001-9
- Der Amerikaner, der den Kolumbus zuerst entdeckte: Essays, 2022 ISBN 978-3-10-397043-2
- Das Wasser im August, 2026 ISBN 978-3-10-397166-8
