= Thüringer Literaturpreis =

Literary award

Thüringer Literaturpreis is a literary prize of Germany. It is awarded every two years and is endowed with 12,000 euros. The winners are selected by a three-member independent jury.

== Recipients ==
- 2005 – Sigrid Damm
- 2007 – Ingo Schulze
- 2009 – Reiner Kunze
- 2011 – Jürgen Becker
- 2013 – Kathrin Schmidt
- 2015 – Wulf Kirsten
- 2017 – Lutz Seiler
- 2019 – Sibylle Berg
- 2021 – Steffen Mensching
- 2023 – Daniela Danz
- 2025 – Emma Braslavsky
