= Kathrin Schmidt =

German poet and novelist

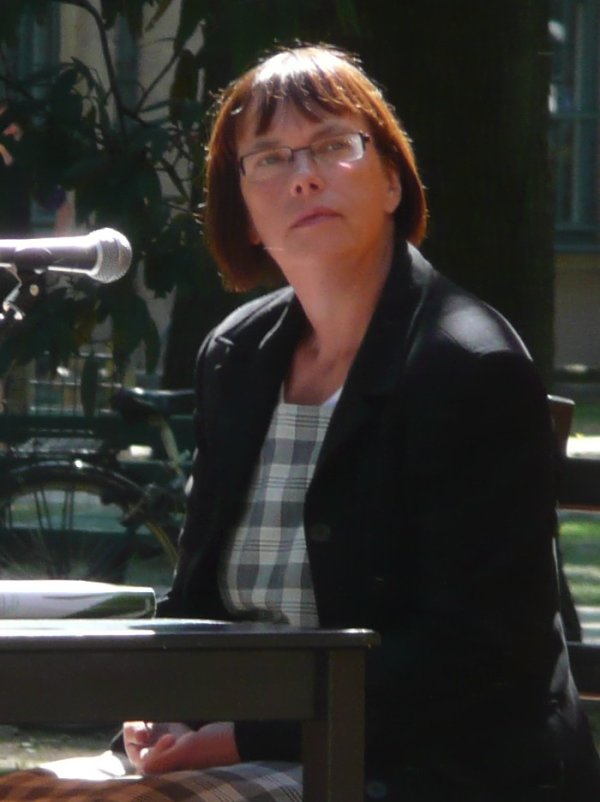
Kathrin Schmidt in 2009

Kathrin Schmidt (born 12 March 1958 in Gotha, Bezirk Erfurt), is a German writer. She is known both for her poetry and prose.

== Life and work ==
Kathrin Schmidt grew up in Gotha and from 1964 in Waltershausen. After graduating from high school, she studied psychology at the University of Jena from 1976 to 1981. After completing her studies (diploma), she worked as a research assistant at the University of Leipzig from 1981 to 1982, and then as a child psychologist at the Rüdersdorf District Hospital and at the Berlin-Marzahn Child and Youth Health Protection Center.

In 1986/1987, she completed special studies at the Johannes R. Becher Institute of Literature in Leipzig. After the fall of the Berlin Wall, she worked at the Round Table in East Berlin. In 1990/1991 she was editor of the feminist women's magazine Ypsilon and worked as a research assistant at the Berlin Institute for Comparative Social Research until 1993. She has been a freelance writer since 1994. She is a member of the PEN Center Germany.

Kathrin Schmidt began writing as a teenager and initially published poetry. The poems are characterized by strict metre, powerful, sensual language and frequent use of puns. The novels, sometimes classified as magical realism due to the baroque fullness of the stories, also show Kathrin Schmidt as a powerful author with an exuberant imagination, who has been compared by critics to the early Günter Grass and Irmtraud Morgner.

To date, her greatest literary success is the autobiographically tinged novel Du stirbst nicht. In it, the author describes the illness and recovery story of the writer Helene, who is confronted with the lack of control over her body after a stroke and must relearn language. The book sold 150,000 copies and was awarded the German Book Prize in 2009.

Kathrin Schmidt raised five children with her husband and lives in Berlin-Mahlsdorf.

== Selected works ==
=== Poetry collections ===
- Kathrin Schmidt. Poetry album (poetry series), 179th edition. Berlin 1982.
- An angel flies through the wallpaper factory. Neues Leben, Berlin 1987, ISBN 3-355-00382-4.
- River Picture with Angel. Suhrkamp, Frankfurt am Main 1995, ISBN 3-518-11931-1; Lyrikedition 2000, Munich 2000, ISBN 3-935284-14-4.
- Go-In the Belladonnas. Kiepenheuer & Witsch, Cologne 2000, ISBN 3-462-02933-9.
- Dances of the Dead. With Karl-Georg Hirsch. Leipzig 2001.
- Blind Bees. Kiepenheuer & Witsch, Cologne 2010, ISBN 978-3-462-04193-4.
- washing place of cool things. Kiepenheuer & Witsch, Cologne 2018, ISBN 978-3-462-31812-8.
- sommerschaums ernte. Kiepenheuer & Witsch, Cologne 2020, ISBN 978-3-462-05390-6.

=== Novels ===
- The Gunnar Lennefsen Expedition. Kiepenheuer & Witsch, Cologne 1998, ISBN 978-3-442-73583-9.
- Koenig's Children. Kiepenheuer & Witsch, Cologne 2002, ISBN 3-462-03129-5.
- Seebach's Black Cats. Kiepenheuer & Witsch, Cologne 2005, ISBN 3-462-03612-2.
- You Don't Die. Kiepenheuer & Witsch, Cologne 2009, ISBN 978-3-462-04098-2.
- Kapok's Sisters. Kiepenheuer & Witsch, Cologne 2016, ISBN 978-3-462-04924-4.

=== Short fiction ===
- Sticky ends. Science fiction novella. Eichborn, Frankfurt am Main 2000, ISBN 3-8218-0682-6.
- Three carp blue. Short prose. Berliner Handpresse, Berlin 2000.
- Finito. Schwamm drüber. Short stories. Kiepenheuer & Witsch, Cologne 2011, ISBN 978-3-462-04317-4.
- Tiefer Schafsee and other stories. With three color etchings by Madeleine Heublein. Leipzig Bibliophile Evening 2016.

=== As editor ===
- Poetry Seminar 1989. 1990.
- Yearbook of Poetry 2011, with Christoph Buchwald. Deutsche Verlags-Anstalt, Munich 2011.

== Awards ==
- 1988: Anna Seghers-Preis
- 1993: Leonce-und-Lena-Preis
- 1994: Merano Poetry Prize
- 1994: Working scholarship of the German Literature Fund
- 1997: Town writer of Berlin-Hellersdorf
- 1998: Prize of the Province of Carinthia at the Ingeborg Bachmann Competition in Klagenfurt
- 1998: Working scholarship of the German Literature Fund
- 1998: Sponsorship award for the Heimito von Doderer Literature Prize
- 1998: GEDOK Literature Promotion Prize
- 2000: Working scholarship of the German Literature Fund
- 2001: German cultural prize
- 2003: Droste Prize of the city of Meersburg
- 2005: Art Prize for Literature of the Land Brandenburg Lotto
- 2009: Preis der SWR-Bestenliste
- 2009: German Book Prize for Du stirbst nicht
- 2017: Thüringer Literaturpreis
