= Christian Haller (writer) =

Swiss novelist, dramaturg and poet

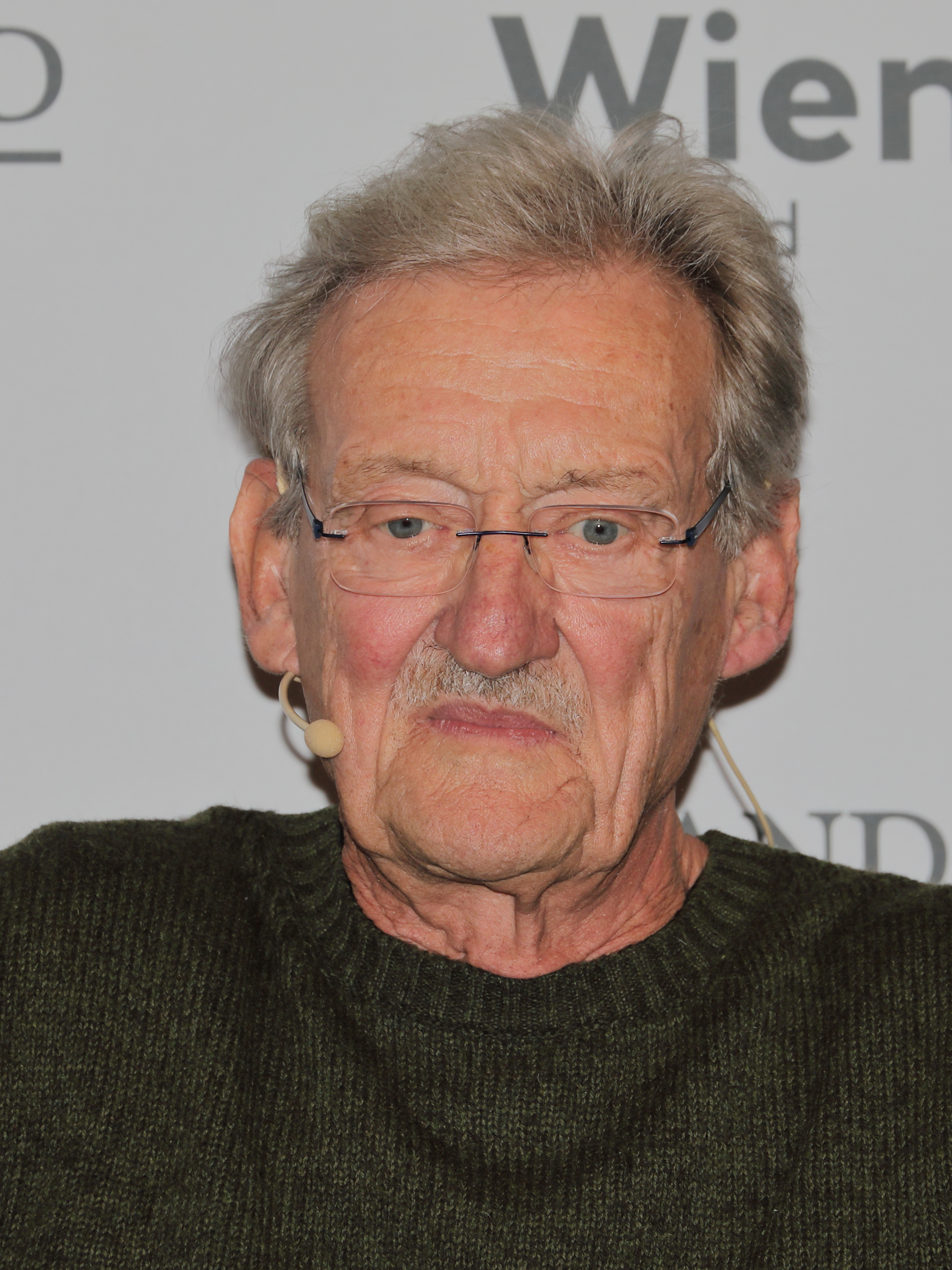
- Christian Haller (2023)
- Born: February 28, 1943 (age 83); Brugg, Switzerland
- Education: University of Basel, Zoology: Diplomabschluss
- Occupations: Novelist, dramaturg, poet
- Employers: The Archive Project: City and Canton of Zürich: Archivist for Adrien Turel; Gottlieb Duttweiler Institute (1974–1982); Theater Claque in Baden; Aargauer Zeitung and Mittelland Zeitung (1996–2009)
- Organizations: Zürich Theater Commission (1994–2000); Eidgenössische Jury für Literatur (2014–2016), Bundesamt für Kultur (BAK, Federal Office of Culture): Haller served on the Jury for Literature that selects recipients of Swiss Literature Awards

Christian Haller (born February 28, 1943) is a Swiss novelist, dramaturg and poet. He has authored more than a dozen books, including Trilogie des Erinnerns (Trilogy of Remembrance) (2008), Sich lichtende Nebel (Clearing Mists (Note: The title Sich lichtende Nebel is sometimes translated as Clearing Mists and sometimes as Clearing the Fog)) (2023), and Das Institut (2024). Haller has been awarded a number of prizes, including the Schiller Foundation Prize (2007), the Kunstpreis des Kantons Aargau (Art Prize of the Canton of Aargau, 2015), and the Schweizer Buchpreis (Swiss Book Prize, 2023).

== Early life and background ==
Haller was born in Brugg but spent most of his youth in Suhr, Aargau. He graduated from Lehrerseminar (Note: A Lehrerseminar is a training school for primary school teachers. Note that Lehrerseminar or the verbal shorthand term Seminar are occasionally mistranslated into English as "seminary". Haller never attented any religious seminary.) in Wettingen, but during this study Haller decided he eventually wanted to become a writer. For one year he worked as a teacher in Rheinfelden, then he moved to Zürich, where he worked at a bookstore and made first attempts to write poetry. At the age of 27, he studied Zoology at the University of Basel.

Commissioned by the city and canton of Zürich, he examined and archived the literary estate of the Swiss philosopher and writer Adrien Turel (1890–1957).

From 1974 to 1982, Haller worked in Rüschlikon as Bereichsleiter der «Sozialen Studien» (head of the "Social Studies" division) at the Gottlieb Duttweiler Institute, an independent think tank and research institute focusing on economic and social trends. According to Haller:

For eight years, I organized international congresses on critical socio-political issues at the GDI. It was an exciting time. I met important figures like Herbert Marcuse and Erich Fromm. I traveled and got to know other countries. In 1970s America, people were talking about a major paradigm shift; new social models were emerging. To paraphrase Dürrenmatt, my work at the GDI shattered the Swiss prison.

Haller's experience in these high-level corporate and managerial strategy circles exposed him to the mechanics of institutional power. Later, Haller processed these dynamics artistically in his novel Das Institut.

From 1996 through 2009, Haller worked as a columnist, guest author or contributor for the Aargauer Zeitung and Mittelland Zeitung. He is currently a freelance author. He has lived in Laufenburg, along the Rhine river, since 1994.

== Literary and theater career ==
Haller worked four years as a dramaturg at the Theater Claque in Baden, Switzerland. From 1994 to 2000, he was a member of the Theaterkommission der Stadt Zürich (Theater Commission for the City of Zurich).

He has written numerous short stories, novels, and plays since the 1980s. Some of his works have been translated into French, Romanian, English and Russian. With his autofictional trilogy Die verborgenen Ufer, Das unaufhaltsame Fliessen, and Flussabwärts gegen den Strom, he stands in the tradition of the Bildungsroman of Karl Philipp Moritz and James Joyce.

Haller's novella Sich lichtende Nebel (Clearing Mists) earned him the Schweizer Buchpreis (Swiss Book Prize) in 2023. It combines fictional storytelling with concepts of quantum physics. His two protagonists, a historian and a physicist, contemplate fundamental questions of physics on a small scale. In this narration, Haller develops striking metaphors that describe quantum mechanics, whose formalism is otherwise off-putting. Through Haller's imagery, abstract terms are filled with content. This clears the path towards understanding the fundamental equations of quantum physics.

== Awards and Honors ==
- 2006 Aargauer Literaturpreis
- 2007 Schiller Foundation Prize for his trilogy of novels titled Trilogie des Erinnerns (Trilogy of Remembrance)
- 2015 Kunstpreis des Kantons Aargau (Art Prize of the Canton of Aargau)
- 2023 Schweizer Buchpreis (Swiss Book Prize) for the 2023 novel Sich lichtende Nebel (Clearing the Fog)

== Works ==
=== Books ===
- Haller, Christian (1980). Die Hälfte der Träume und andere Geschichten. Noack-Hübner. ISBN 9783884530092. (Collection of short stories)
- Haller, Christian (1984). Prinz Ramins Baum. Lenzburg: Çoban-Verlag. ISBN 3905284030. (Collection of stories)
- Haller, Christian (1991). Strandgut. Frankfurt am Main: Luchterhand. ISBN 978-3-63086-768-7. (Novel)
- Haller, Christian (1995). Der Brief ans Meer. München: Luchterhand. ISBN 978-3-63086-851-6. (Novel)
- Haller, Christian (1996). Kopfüberland oder die Reise zu den Bäumen. Eine Geschichte. Eggingen: Isele. ISBN 3-86142-073-2.
- Haller, Christian (1998). Der Fernseher ist kein schlechter Priester. Eggingen: Isele. ISBN 3-86142-107-0. (Poems)
- Haller, Christian (2008). Trilogie des Erinnerns [Trilogy of Remembrance]. München: btb. ISBN 978-3-442-73676-8. Paperback (collected edition)
  Individual editions:
  - Haller, Christian (2001). Die verschluckte Musik. München: Luchterhand. ISBN 3-630-87100-3. (Novel)
  - Haller, Christian (2004). Das schwarze Eisen. München: Luchterhand. ISBN 3-630-87184-4. (Novel)
  - Haller, Christian (2006). Die besseren Zeiten. München: Luchterhand. ISBN 3-630-87246-8. (Novel)
- Haller, Christian (2008). Am Rand von allem. Eggingen: Isele. ISBN 978-3-86142-438-3. (Poems)
- Haller, Christian (2008). Im Park. Eggingen: Isele. ISBN 978-3-630-87284-1. (Novel)
- Haller, Christian (2010). Die Stecknadeln des Herrn Nabokov. Eggingen: Isele. ISBN 978-3-630-87350-3.
- Haller, Christian (2013). Der seltsame Fremde. München: Luchterhand. ISBN 978-3-630-87392-3. (Novel)
- Haller, Christian (2014). Laub vor dem Winter. Zürich: Wolfbach Verlag. ISBN 978-3-905910-46-9. (Poems)
- Haller, Christian (2025). Fluss-Trilogie: Die autobiografischen Romane. München: btb. ISBN 9783442775460. Paperback (collected edition)
  Individual editions:
  - Haller, Christian (2015). Die verborgenen Ufer. München: Luchterhand. ISBN 978-3-630-87465-4. (autobiography vol. 1) (Novel)
  - Haller, Christian (2017). Das unaufhaltsame Fliessen. München: Luchterhand. ISBN 978-3-641-21308-4. (autobiography vol. 2) Novel
  - Haller, Christian (2020). Flussabwärts gegen den Strom. München: Luchterhand. ISBN 978-3-630-87602-3. (autobiography vol. 3) (Novel)
- Haller, Christian (2018). Reise im Korbstuhl. Zürich: Wolfbach Verlag. ISBN 978-3-906929-03-3. (Epic)
- Haller, Christian (2022). Blitzgewitter. Eine kurze Geschichte des Lichts, in das wir uns stellen [Thunder and Lightning. A Brief History of the Light of Self-Illumination]. Berlin: Matthes & Seitz. ISBN 978-3-7518-0557-5.
- Haller, Christian (2023). Sich lichtende Nebel [Clearing Mists]. München: Luchterhand. ISBN 978-3-630-87733-4. (Novella)
- Haller, Christian (2024). Das Institut (in German). München: Luchterhand. ISBN 978-3-630-87776-1. (Novel)
- Haller, Christian (2026). Einfallende Dämmerung. München: Luchterhand. ISBN 978-3-630-87792-1. (Novella)

=== Stage plays ===
- Haller, Christian (April 24, 1987). Götterspiele [Divine Games] (Premiere live performance). Bremgarten, Switzerland: Theater im Spittel.
  - Later published as: Haller, Christian (2000). Götterspiele [Divine Games] (Play) (in German). Editura Alpha.
- Haller, Christian (1991). Leben [Life] (Theatrical manuscript) (in German). Berlin: Gustav Kiepenheuer Bühnenvertrieb.
