= Swiss Book Prize =

Swiss annual literary award

The Swiss Book Prize (German: Schweizer Buchpreis) is a literary award awarded annually by a jury on behalf of the Swiss Booksellers' Association. The prize amount is CHF 30,000. The award was instituted in 2008 following the example of the German Book Prize. Only German language works of authors living in Switzerland or of Swiss nationality are eligible.

== Honorees ==
Blue Ribbon = Winner

=== 2008 ===
- Rolf Lappert, Nach Hause schwimmen
- Lukas Bärfuss, Hundert Tage
- Anja Jardine, Als der Mond vom Himmel fiel
- Adolf Muschg, Kinderhochzeit (withdrew)
- Peter Stamm, Wir fliegen

=== 2009 ===
- Ilma Rakusa, Mehr Meer
- Eleonore Frey Muster aus Hans
- Jürg Laederach Briefe aus Mailland
- Angelika Overath Flughafenfische
- Urs Widmer Herr 'Adamson

=== 2010 ===
- Melinda Nadj Abonji, Tauben fliegen auf
- Dorothee Elmiger, Einladung an die Waghalsigen
- Urs Faes, Paarbildung
- Pedro Lenz, Der Goalie bin ig
- Kurt Marti, Notizen und Details 1964 – 2007

=== 2011 ===
- Catalin Dorian Florescu, Jacob beschliesst zu lieben
- Monica Cantieni, Grünschnabel
- Felix Philipp Ingold, Alias oder Das wahre Leben
- Charles Lewinsky, Gerron
- Peter Stamm, Seerücken

=== 2012 ===
- Peter von Matt, Das Kalb vor der Gotthardpost
- Sibylle Berg, Vielen Dank für das Leben
- Ursula Fricker, Ausser sich
- Thomas Meyer, Wolkenbruchs wunderliche Reise in die Arme einer Schickse
- Alain Claude Sulzer, Aus den Fugen

=== 2013 ===
- Jens Steiner, Carambole
- Ralph Dutli, Soutines letzte Fahrt
- Roman Graf, Niedergang
- Jonas Lüscher, Frühling der Barbaren
- Henriette Vásárhelyi, immeer

=== 2014 ===
- Lukas Bärfuss, Koala
- Dorothee Elmiger, Schlafgänger
- Heinz Helle, Der beruhigende Klang von explodierendem Kerosin
- Guy Krneta, Unger üs
- Gertrud Leutenegger, Panischer Frühling

=== 2015 ===
- Monique Schwitter, Eins im Andern
- Martin R. Dean, Verbeugung vor Spiegeln
- Dana Grigorcea, Das primäre Gefühl der Schuldlosigkeit
- Meral Kureyshi, Elefanten im Garten
- Ruth Schweikert, Wie wir älter werden

=== 2016 ===
- Christian Kracht, The Dead (Die Toten)
- Sacha Batthyany, Und was hat das mit mir zu tun?
- Christoph Höhtker, Alles sehen
- Charles Lewinsky, Andersen
- Michelle Steinbeck, Mein Vater war ein Mann an Land und im Wasser ein Walfisch

=== 2017 ===
The longlist was announced in August 2017. The shortlist was later announced. The winner was announced in November 2017.

- Jonas Lüscher, Kraft
- Martina Clavadetscher, Knochenlieder
- Urs Faes, Halt auf Verlangen. Ein Fahrtenbuch
- Lukas Holliger, Das kürzere Leben des Klaus Halm
- Julia Weber, Immer ist alles schön

=== 2018 ===
- Peter Stamm, Die sanfte Gleichgültigkeit der Welt
- Heinz Helle, Die Überwindung der Schwerkraft
- Gianna Molinari, Hier ist noch alles möglich
- Vincenzo Todisco, Das Eidechsenkind
- Julia von Lucadou, Die Hochhausspringerin

=== 2019 ===
- Sibylle Berg, GRM. Brainfuck
- Simone Lappert, Der Sprung
- Tabea Steiner, Balg
- Alain Claude Sulzer, Unhaltbare Zustände
- Ivna Žic, Die Nachkommende

=== 2020 ===
- Anna Stern, das alles hier, jetzt
- Dorothee Elmiger, Aus der Zuckerfabrik
- Tom Kummer, Von schlechten Eltern
- Charles Lewinsky, Der Halbbart
- Karl Rühmann, Der Held

=== 2021 ===
- Martina Clavadetscher, Die Erfindung Des Ungehorsam
- Thomas Duarte, Was der Fall Ist
- Michael Hugentobler, Feuerland
- Christian Kracht, Eurotrash
- Veronika Sutter, Grösser als du

=== 2022 ===
- Kim de l'Horizon, Blutbuch
- Simon Froehling, Dürrst
- Lioba Happel, Pommfritz aus der Hölle
- Thomas Hürlimann, Der rote Diamant
- Thomas Röthlisberger, Steine zählen

=== 2023 ===
- Christian Haller, Sich lichtende Nebel

=== 2024 ===
- Zora del Buono, Seinetwegen

=== 2025 ===
- Dorothee Elmiger, Die Holländerinnen

=== 2026 ===
- Sarah Elena Müller, Unwucht
