= GRM. Brainfuck =

Novel by Sibylle Berg

GRM. Brainfuck (with GRM pronounced as Grime) is a dystopian novel by the German-Swiss author Sibylle Berg, published in April 2019 by Kiepenheuer & Witsch. In 2019 it won the Swiss Book Prize.

== Plot ==
The novel is set in the near future in the English town of Rochdale and describes the lives of four teenage friends. They belong to the so-called lower class, and their everyday life is characterised by poverty, unkindness and brutality. After all four teenagers lose their original family through various strokes of fate, they move to London, with the aim of taking revenge on people living in London who have had a negative impact on their lives. Here they live outside the city and society in abandoned factories, where they come into contact with the local hacker scene. They are able to locate and observe the targets of their revenge, but these all either die or lead an unhappy existence without any intervention from the main characters. The author also addresses social developments in the course of the novel. For example, due to high unemployment, the unconditional basic income is introduced, but at the same time it is linked to a morally normative, technological state surveillance system. The state also restricts the rights of women and minorities. The four protagonists escape this surveillance through their illegal way of life. Only after a change of government following a political election do they integrate into society, which, according to the end of the book, leads to the isolation of the four participants from each other.

== Style ==
The style of the novel is partly influenced by rap. The word GRM is a disemvoweling of the word grime, referring to the rap style. The narrator focuses on one character at a time and then switches to portraying the next person by mentioning their name. This person is introduced, especially if he or she is new to the plot, through a kind of profile in the form of catchwords, as in a wanted poster. In addition to the four main characters of the novel, people who have a (mostly negative) influence on the protagonists are also described in this way. Among others, this includes Thome, who belongs to the upper class.

== Characters ==
The following characters play a crucial role in the novel:

- Don has a brother with whom she lives along with her black, single mother in the first part of the book. The mother has frequently changing partners (including Don's father in some cases), who are usually aggressive and also beat and harass Don.
- Hannah is the only child of Asian parents. Her mother dies after a medical error, leading her father to commit suicide.
- Karen is highly gifted and therefore suffers especially from the viciousness of her two brothers. Her black, single mother is completely overwhelmed by the situation. All family members (except Karen) die in a house fire.
- Peter is autistic and comes to England from Poland with his mother. His mother leaves him alone in Rochdale and moves to London with a rich Russian.

Furthermore, there are numerous secondary characters in the book, some of whom appear once, others regularly. Among other things, EX 2279 regularly expresses itself in the programming language Brainfuck.

== Reception ==
=== Commercial success ===
Immediately after its publication, the novel made it onto Der Spiegel's bestseller list, where it was listed among the top ten books ten times and achieved fourth place. This makes the book the author's most successful publication to date.

=== Contemporary criticism ===
The apocalyptic writing style is frequently discussed in reviews of the book. Ursula März of Die Zeit finds the ability of this gloomy milieu study to evoke tenderness and empathy in the reader despite its brutality to be a colossal achievement. Carsten Otte in Der Tagesspiegel also attests to the novel's astonishing impact, despite its simple narrative premise and rabid doom-mongering. Dietmar Jacobsen of literaturkritik.de, however, describes the book as "perhaps one or two hundred pages too long". Eva Behrendt in Die Tageszeitung and Marlen Hobrack in Die Welt find that the characters in the book do not develop a personality, but are simply abandoned to their misery. For Philipp Theison in the Neue Zürcher Zeitung the book is hard to categorise and against everything that still believes in a blueprint for the future.

=== Awards ===
- 2019: Swiss Book Prize

== Editions ==
- GRM. Brainfuck - 1st edition, 640 pages. Kiepenheuer & Witsch, Köln 2019, ISBN 978-3-462-05143-8.
