= Jürgen Becker (poet) =

German poet and writer (1932–2024)

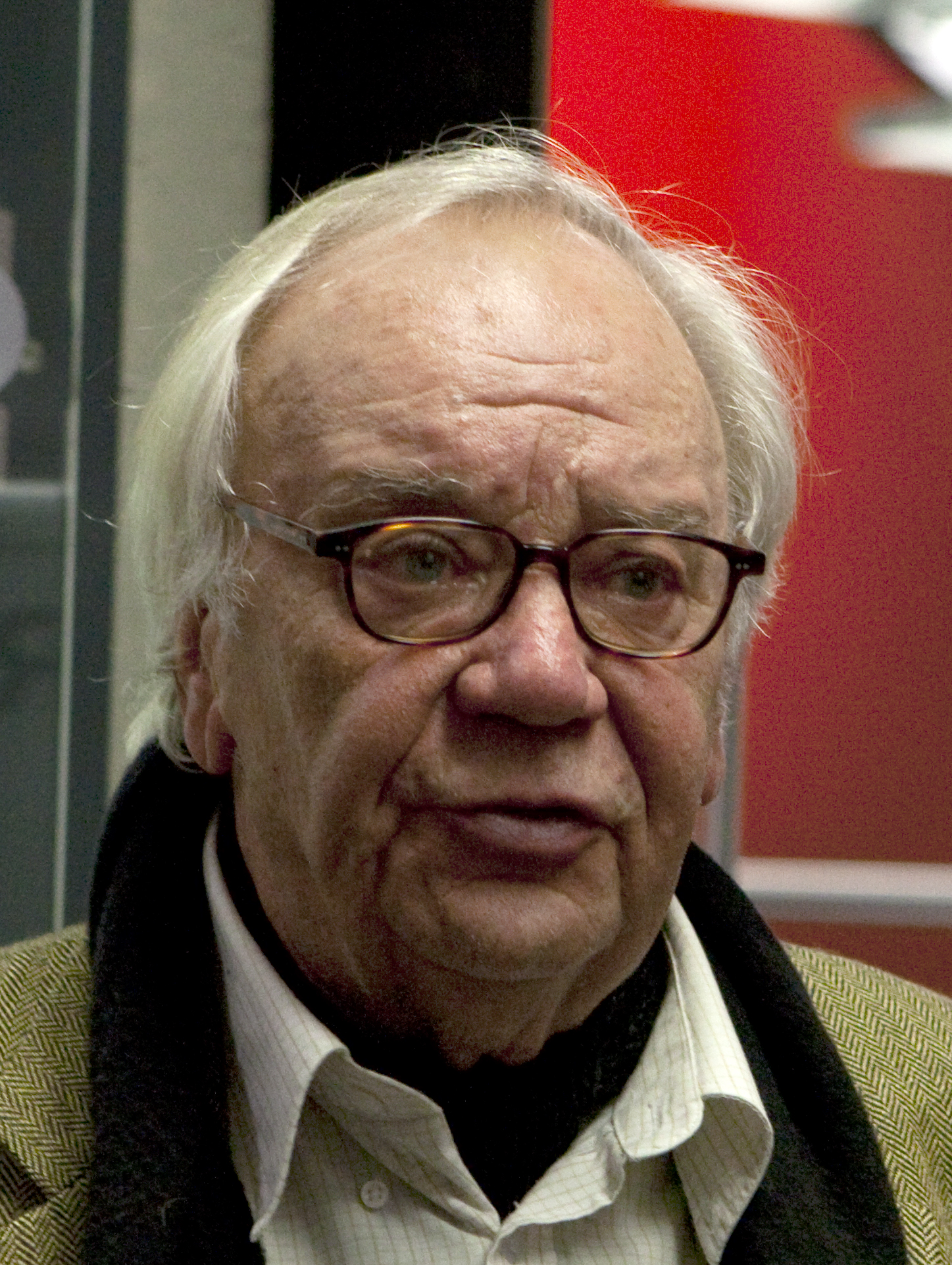
- Becker in 2009
- Born: 10 July 1932; Cologne, Rhine Province, Prussia, Weimar Germany
- Died: 7 November 2024 (aged 92); Cologne, North Rhine-Westphalia, Germany
- Occupation(s): Poet, writer, radio play author
- Spouse: Rango Bohne (m. 1965; died 2021)
- Children: 1

Jürgen Becker (German pronunciation: [ˈjʏʁɡn̩ ˈbɛkɐ]; 10 July 1932 – 7 November 2024) was a German poet, prose writer and audio play author. He won the 2014 Georg Büchner Prize.

== Life and career ==
Becker was born in Cologne on 10 July 1932. His family moved from Cologne to Erfurt in 1939; he experienced the war as a child in Thuringia. In 1947, the family moved to Waldbröl in West Germany, and in 1950, back to Cologne. From 1950 to 1953, he attended a gymnasium there, completing with the Abitur. He began to study German studies, but broke off a year later.

From 1959 to 1964, Becker was a member of the Westdeutscher Rundfunk, and from 1964 to 1966, literary editor in the Rowohlt publishing house. He became a freelance writer in 1968. From 1973, he was director of Suhrkamp Theater publishing, and from 1974 to 1993, director of the department for audio plays of Deutschlandfunk.

Becker emerged as a poet in the 1960s, with a highly experimental kind of literature in open form, in opposition to conventional narrative. In later texts, landscape plays an important role in his poetry. He also wrote stories and audio plays. Since 1994, his contributions have appeared in the journal Sinn und Form, edited by the Akademie der Künste in Berlin.

From 1960, Becker was a member of the Group 47, whose literary prize he won at the last meeting of the group in 1967. Since 1969, he was a member of the PEN Centre Germany and the Akademie der Künste, since 1974 also of the Deutsche Akademie für Sprache und Dichtung, since 1984 of the Academy of Sciences and Literature in Mainz, and since 2009 of the North Rhine-Westphalian Academy of Sciences, Humanities and the Arts.

In 2012 a first documentary about him appeared, entitled "In Hell of Silence" The Author Jürgen Becker. Produced by Christoph Felder, the 80-minutes portrait featured him in interview and also short contributions by his colleagues Günter Grass, Uwe Johnson and Hans Magnus Enzensberger from Group 47.

=== Personal life ===
Becker was married to the artist Rango Bohne from 1965, and lived in Odenthal near Cologne. Their son is the photographer and filmmaker Boris Becker. His wife died in 2021.

Becker died in Cologne on 7 November 2024, at the age of 92.

== Works ==
- Bilder, Häuser, Hausfreunde. Drei Hörspiele. Suhrkamp, Frankfurt 1969; Teilausgabe mit einem
- Nachwort des Autors: Häuser. Hörspiel. Reclam, Stuttgart 1972, ISBN 978-3-15-009331-3.
- Umgebungen. Suhrkamp, Frankfurt 1970, ISBN 978-3-518-00722-8.
- Schnee. Gedichte. Literarisches Colloquium, Berlin 1971.
- Eine Zeit ohne Wörter. Suhrkamp, Frankfurt 1971, ISBN 978-3-518-06520-4.
- Die Zeit nach Harrimann. 29 Szenen für Nora, Helen, Jenny und den stummen Diener Moltke. Als Bühnenmanuskript gedruckt. Suhrkamp, Frankfurt 1971, OCLC 74148215.
- Das Ende der Landschaftsmalerei. Gedichte. Suhrkamp, Frankfurt 1974, ISBN 978-3-518-02084-5.
- Erzähl mir nichts vom Krieg. Gedichte. Suhrkamp, Frankfurt 1977, ISBN 978-3-518-02114-9.
- In der verbleibenden Zeit. Gedichte. Suhrkamp, Frankfurt 1979, ISBN 978-3-518-02111-8.
- Erzählen bis Ostende. Suhrkamp, Frankfurt 1981, ISBN 978-3-518-02117-0.
- Gedichte 1965–1980. Suhrkamp, Frankfurt 1981, ISBN 978-3-518-37190-9.
- mit Rango Bohne: Fenster und Stimmen. Suhrkamp, Frankfurt 1982, ISBN 978-3-518-02118-7.
- Felder, Ränder, Umgebungen. Suhrkamp, Frankfurt 1983, ISBN 978-3-518-04468-1.
- Die Abwesenden. Drei Hörspiele. Suhrkamp, Frankfurt 1983, ISBN 978-3-518-37382-8.
- Die Türe zum Meer. Suhrkamp, Frankfurt 1983, ISBN 978-3-518-04506-0. Odenthals Küste. Gedichte. Suhrkamp, Frankfurt 1986, ISBN 978-3-518-02572-7.
- Das Gedicht von der wiedervereinigten Landschaft. Suhrkamp, Frankfurt 1988, ISBN 978-3-518-40122-4.
- mit Rango Bohne: Frauen mit dem Rücken zum Betrachter. Suhrkamp, Frankfurt 1989, ISBN 978-3-518-40183-5.
- Das englische Fenster. Gedichte. Suhrkamp, Frankfurt 1990, ISBN 978-3-518-40284-9.
- Beispielsweise am Wannsee. Ausgewählte Gedichte Suhrkamp, Frankfurt 1992, ISBN 978-3-518-22112-9.
- Foxtrott im Erfurter Stadion. Gedichte. Suhrkamp, Frankfurt 1993, ISBN 978-3-518-40545-1.
- Die Gedichte. Suhrkamp, Frankfurt 1995, ISBN 978-3-518-39096-2.
- mit Boris Becker: Geräumtes Gelände. Verlag der Buchhandlung Walther König, Köln 1995, ISBN 978-3-88375-228-0.
- mit Rango Bohne: Korrespondenzen mit Landschaft. Suhrkamp, Frankfurt 1996, ISBN 978-3-518-40801-8.
- Gegend mit Spuren. Hörspiel. Akademie der Künste, Berlin 1996, ISBN 978-3-88331-008-4.
- Der fehlende Rest. Erzählung., Frankfurt 1997, ISBN 978-3-518-40857-5.
- Kaleidoskop der Stimmen. Ein Gespräch mit Leo Kreutzer und das Hörspiel „Bahnhof am Meer". Wehrhahn, Hannover 1998, ISBN 978-3-932324-55-0.
- Journal der Wiederholungen. Gedichte. Suhrkamp, Frankfurt 1999, ISBN 978-3-518-41026-4.
- Aus der Geschichte der Trennungen. Roman. Suhrkamp, Frankfurt 1999, ISBN 978-3-518-39762-6.
- mit Rango Bohne: Häuser und Häuser. Fünfunddreißig Prosatexte. Suhrkamp, Frankfurt 2002, ISBN 978-3-518-41307-4.
- Schnee in den Ardennen. Journalroman. Suhrkamp, Frankfurt 2003, ISBN 978-3-518-41458-3. Awarded "Ein Buch für die Stadt", Cologne 2009.
- Die folgenden Seiten. Journalgeschichten. Suhrkamp, Frankfurt 2006, ISBN 978-3-518-41820-8.
- Dorfrand mit Tankstelle. Gedichte. Suhrkamp, Frankfurt 2007, ISBN 978-3-518-22420-5.
- Aus der Kölner Bucht. Gedichte. Suhrkamp, Frankfurt 2009, ISBN 978-3-518-46155-6.
- Im Radio das Meer. Journalsätze. Suhrkamp, Frankfurt 2009, ISBN 978-3-518-42108-6.
- Scheunen im Gelände. Gedichte. Mit Collagen von Rango Bohne. Edition Lyrik Kabinett, München 2012, ISBN 978-3-938776-31-5.
- Wie es weiterging. Ein Durchgang – Prosa aus fünf Jahrzehnten. Suhrkamp, Berlin 2012, ISBN 978-3-518-42305-9.
- "Was wir noch wissen. Journal der Augenblicke und Erinnerungen". In: Sinn und Form 4/2013, pp. 591–602.
- Jetzt die Gegend damals. Journalroman. Suhrkamp, Berlin 2015, ISBN 978-3-518-42488-9.

== Works in English ==
- Becker, Jürgen (1981). Häuser : Hörspiel. Stuttgart: Reclam. ISBN 978-3-15-009331-3.
- Becker, Jürgen (2015). Blackbirds in September : selected shorter poems. Pittsburgh, PA: Black Lawrence Press. ISBN 978-1-62557-938-6.

== Awards ==
- 1965/66: Villa Massimo scholarship
- 1967: Prize of Group 47
- 1994: Peter Huchel Prize
- 1995: Heinrich-Böll-Preis
- 2001: Uwe Johnson Prize
- 2011: Thüringer Literaturpreis
- 2013: Günter Eich Prize
- 2014: Georg Büchner Prize
