= Boris Becker (internet personality) =

Belgian dancer and internet personality (born 1993)

- Born: Boris Becker Bule Mbelu; May 16, 1993 (age 33)
- Occupations: Dancer, internet personality
- Years active: 2017–present

Instagram information
- Page: mr_boris_becker
- Followers: 2.6m

TikTok information
- Page: mr_boris_becker
- Followers: 1m (April 13, 2024)

YouTube information
- Genre: Prank
- Subscribers: 853k (April 13, 2024)
- Views: 385m (April 13, 2024)

Boris Becker (born 16 May 1993), also known as Mr Boris Becker, born Boris Becker Bule Mbelu, is a Belgian dancer and internet personality. He became known on the internet by trapping people or celebrities in the street.

== Early life ==
Boris grew up in Antwerp, Belgium.

== Career ==
Becker became known in 2017 on Facebook.

In 2019, he pranked the French rapper Maes.

In 2021, he collaborated with PSG for the release of a new jersey, for the inauguration of the Paris Saint-Germain Academy in Rwanda.

In June 2021, he infiltrated the security of Travis Scott during the Fashion week in Paris. Afterwards, Travis Scott blocked him on Instagram. Later that year in November, the RATP filed a complaint against him and another influencer after they were filmed pretending to drive the metro in a video posted on Instagram, judging this joke of bad taste.

In November 2021, he interviewed Will Smith before the release of the film King Richard.

== Personal life ==
Becker is a fan of combat sports. In January 2021, during the England's third national COVID-19 lockdown, Becker was arrested and locked up for four days for being outside "without a reasonable excuse". He declared that the police treated him like a criminal.

== Awards and nominations ==
Award	Year	Category	Result	Ref
E! People’s Choice Awards	2020	Social Star France	Nominated	

== Filmography ==
=== Video clip ===
- 2023 : DERIX - Just Dance

=== Serie ===
- 2023 : Celebrity Hunted : Chasse à l'homme on Amazon Prime Video
