= Helene Richter =

Austrian English scholar and theatre critic

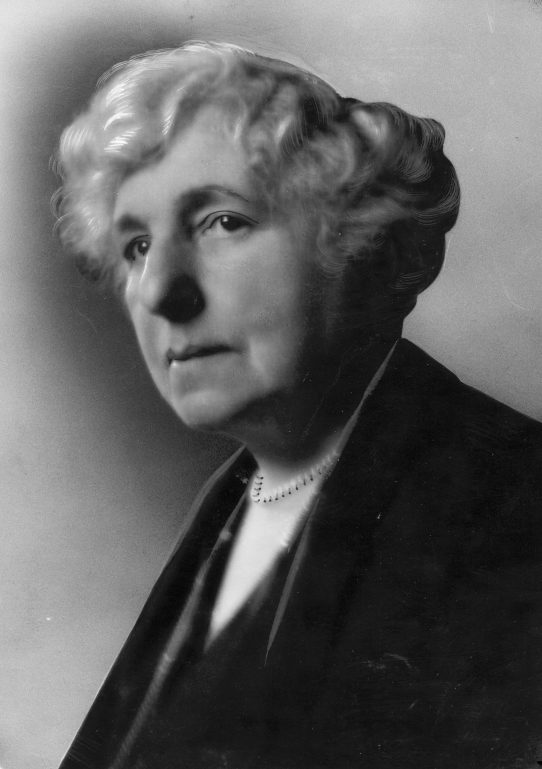
- Helene Richter, c. 1931
- Born: 4 August 1861; Vienna, Austrian Empire
- Died: 8 November 1942 (aged 81); Theresienstadt Ghetto, Terezín, Protectorate of Bohemia and Moravia
- Relatives: Elise Richter (sister)

Helene Richter (4 August 1861 in Vienna, Austria-Hungary – 8 November 1942 in Theresienstadt Ghetto) was an Austrian specialist for English studies. She specialized in drama and theatre critic. She was sister of Elise Richter (1865–1943), Romance studies professor and, like her Helene, killed by the Nazis in Theresienstadt. She is a published author and specialist known for her extensive work on English Romanticism and her reviews of theatre plays at the Vienna Burgtheater. Together with her sister Elise, she led one of the last salons in Vienna, offering a place of discourse for artists and intellectuals.

== Early life ==
Helene Richter was born on 4 August 1861 in Vienna into a bourgeoise family of Jewish descent. Her father was Maximilian Richter (1824-1890), a doctor; her mother was Emilie Richter, née Lackenbacher (1832-1889); her sister was Elise Richter (1865-1943), a professor of Romance Philology and the first woman to habilitate and become professor at the University of Vienna. Helene and Elise Richter were taught at home, following non-denominational principles. In January 1911 the sisters took on a Protestant denomination. Since women were not admitted to university, Helene Richter undertook autodidactic studies for several years before being admitted as guest student to the University of Vienna in 1891.

Richter lived in Vienna throughout her life. In her youth, she travelled extensively across Europe and North Africa. She cohabited with her sister Elise Richter; both women never married. At their weekly salon, influential intellectuals such as the feminists Marianne Hainisch and Rosa Mayreder, theatre director Hugo Thimig, actor Auguste Wilbrandt-Baudius, writers Max Kalbeck and Richard Kralik and classical philologist Hans von Arnim met to exchange ideas.

== Professional career ==
Helene Richter is best known for her work on English Romanticism, starting with the publication of an article on Percy Bysshe Shelley in Vossische Zeitung in 1892. Her work on Shelly further includes a German translation of and commentary on “Prometheus Unbound”, published in 1895, and a 640-page biography, published in 1898. Other works on English Romanticism include biographies on Thomas Chatterton (1900), William Blake (1906), George Eliot (1907), Oscar Wilde (1912), George Bernard Shaw (1913), and Lord Byron (1929). A two-volume publication on the history of English Romanticism (1911-1916) was the foundation of her widespread academic recognition. In 1897 Helene Richter published a study on the English feminist Mary Wollstonecraft.

Richter was also a renowned theatre critic, particularly for the Burgtheater, Austria’s national theatre in Vienna. She contributed to the Shakespeare-Jahrbuch (Shakespeare Yearbook) and published several biographical volumes focusing on the Burgtheater and its important figures, like Auguste Wilbrandt-Baudius, Josef Kainz, and Josef Lewinsky.

In 1931 Richter received honorary doctorate degrees from the universities of Heidelberg and Erlangen and honorary citizenship of the City of Vienna.

== WWII and death ==
After the National Socialists took over power in Austria in 1938, Richter faced persecution by the Nazis. She was banned from lecturing at the university, denied access to the university library, had to give up their house and sell their private library. Both sisters refused the offer to be evacuated to another country by quoting “alte Bäume verpflanzt man nicht” (“old trees are not to be moved”). Richter was deported to Theresienstadt Ghetto on October 8th 1942 and died there on November 8th 1942.

== Legacy ==
Since 1998, the gate entering the University of Vienna campus from Garnisongasse 13 has been named “Richter-Tor” to commemorate Elise and Helene Richter. The “Helene Richter Saal” is a lecture hall at the same campus, used by the Department of English and American Studies. In 2008, the City of Vienna named a street in Floridsdorf, Vienna’s 21st district, “Helene-Richter-Gasse” in honour of Helene Richter. When Helene Richter was forced to sell her and her sister’s vast collection of books due to Nazi persecution, she contacted the University of Cologne in Germany. Hermann Corsten, then director of the university library, offered 4,600 Reichsmark for the purchase of 2,700 volumes during a meeting in Vienna in 1942. Before the money was transferred, Helene and Elise Richter were deported to Theresienstadt Ghetto and died. The books were transported to the library in Cologne. When the relevant correspondence was found, the library initiated a process of provenance research, reconstructed the library and offered restitution to the heirs of Helene and Elise Richter. In 2014, the heirs and the library reached an agreement by which the collection remains at the university library in Cologne to further serve the pursuit of science. More books of Helene Richter’s collection can be found at the Österreichische Nationalbibliothek (Austrian National Library), the University of Vienna Library and at the Theatermuseum (Austrian Theatre Museum). The Wienbibliothek im Rathaus (Vienna Library at the Town Hall) owns the private document collection of Helene Richter. From 2007 to 2018 the Deutsche Anglistenverband (The German Association for the Study of English) awarded the Helene-Richter-prize to junior scientists for outstanding publications within the field of English Studies.

== Selected works ==
The following works may be found on Wien Geschichte Wiki:

- Percy Bysshe Shelley: Der entfesselte Prometheus. Lyrisches Drama in 4 Aufzügen. Deutsch in den Versmaßen des Originals und mit Anmerkungen versehen von Helene Richter. Leipzig: Reclam [1895] (Universal-Bibliothek, 3321/3322)
- Helene Richter: Mary Wollstonecraft. Die Verfechterin der "Rechte der Frau". Wien: Konegen 1897
- Helene Richter: Percy Bysshe Shelley. Weimar: Felber 1898
- Helene Richter: William Blake. Strassburg: Heitz 1906
- Helene Richter: George Eliot. Fünf Aufsätze. Berlin: A. Duncker 1907
- Helene Richter: Schauspieler-Charakteristiken. Hamburg / Leipzig: Voß 1914
- Helene Richter: Unser Burgtheater. Wien: Amalthea 1918
- Helene Richter: Shakespeare der Mensch. Leipzig 1923
- Helene Richter: Josef Lewinsky. Fünfzig Jahre Wiener Kunst und Kultur. Zum 150-jährigen Jubiläum des Burgtheaters mit Unterstützung der Stadt Wien hrsg. Wien u. a.: Deutscher Verlag für Jugend und Volk 1926
- Helene Richter: Lord Byron. Persönlichkeit und Werk. Halle (Saale): Niemeyer 1929
- Helene Richter: Auguste Wilbrandt-Baudius: Der Weg einer großen Burgschauspielerin. Aus dem Nachlaß von Helene Richter hrsg. von Rainer Zitta. Wien: Notring der Wissenschaftlichen Verbände Österreichs 1963
- Helene Richter: Die drei großen Tragödinnen des Burgtheaters im 19. Jahrhundert. [Sophie Schröder, Julie Rettich, Charlotte Wolter]. Unveröffentlichtes Manuskript. Wienbibliothek im Rathaus, Druckschriftensammlung, B-88184
