= Ludolf Wienbarg =

German journalist and literary critic

Christian Ludolf Wienbarg
- Born: 25 December 1802; Altona, Hamburg, Kingdom of Prussia
- Died: 2 January 1872 (aged 69); Schleswig, Schleswig-Holstein, German Empire
- Citizenship: Prussian (1802-1871); German (1872)
- Occupations: Journalist, Editor, Theologian
- Known for: Founding figure of the Young Germany movement during the Vormärz period

Academic background
- Education: Kiel University, Marburg University
- Thesis: (1829)

Academic work
- Notable students: Christian Günther von Bernstorff
- Main interests: Platonic ideas

Christian Ludolf Wienbarg (25 December 1802 – 2 January 1872) was a German journalist and literary critic, one of the founders of the Young Germany movement during the Vormärz period.

== Biography ==
Wienbarg was born in Altona, as the son of a blacksmith. In 1822 he started studying theology at the Kiel University. In 1826, he had to drop his studies for financial reasons and worked as a private tutor for Count Christian Günther von Bernstorff in Lauenburg. In 1829, he was conferred a doctor's degree at Marburg University for his thesis on the original meaning of Platonic ideas. In 1833, he accepted a job as lecturer in Kiel.

In 1834, he published a collection with 22 of his lectures under the title "Ästhetische Feldzüge" ("Aesthetic Campaigns"). With the opening words "To you, young Germany, I dedicate these speeches" he helped to create the expression "Young Germany". In the same year, he met the writer Karl Gutzkow in Frankfurt am Main. They planned to publish a journal in summer 1835. However, it was seized and banned by the German government even before the delivery of its first edition.

In November 1835, Wienbarg's writings, together with those of Heinrich Heine, Ludwig Börne, Karl Gutzkow, Heinrich Laube and Theodor Mundt, were first banned in Prussia and subsequently in all the member states of the German confederation. Wienbarg was forced to leave Frankfurt and escaped to Heligoland, then a British island popular with political refugees from Germany. In the autumn of 1836, he returned to Hamburg where he resumed his activities as a journalist and editor for different journals. At the end of the 1830s, he was supported by his siblings. On 12 May 1839 he married Elisabeth Wilhelmine Dorothea Marwedel, daughter of a middle-class family in Altona, but his marriage did not improve his financial situation.

In 1846, his plans to emigrate to the United States were discussed in the press, but the national enthusiasm for the Schleswig-Holstein Question made him rethink his decision. In 1848 and 1849, he volunteered in the First Schleswig War.

After 1850, Wienbarg lived in Hamburg and Altona, addicted to alcohol, destitute, and forgotten by the public. In 1869, he was committed to a psychiatric clinic in Schleswig where he died on 2 January 1872.

== Works (selection) ==
- Aesthetische Feldzüge. Dem jungen Deutschland gewidmet. Hamburg: Hoffmann u. Campe 1834. Reprint, with modernised orthography: East Berlin/Weimar, Aufbau 1964.
- Zur neuesten Literatur. Von L. W., Verfasser der "ästhetischen Feldzüge. Mannheim: Löwenthal 1835.
- Wanderungen durch den Thierkreis. Hamburg: Hoffmann u. Campe 1835; Reprint: Frankfurt a. M. 1973.
- Tagebuch von Helgoland. Hamburg: Hoffmann u. Campe, 1838. Digitalisat
- Die Dramatiker der Jetztzeit, H. 1. Altona 1839.
- Die Volks-Versammlung zu Nortorf am 14ten September 1846. Hamburg: Hoffmann u. Campe 1846.
- Der dänische Fehdehandschuh. Aufgenommen von L. W. Hamburg: Hoffmann u. Campe 1846.
- Nach Helgoland und anderswohin. Gedanken auf Reisen. Edited by Alfred Estermann. Nördlingen: Greno 1987.
