= Karl Gutzkow =

German writer (1811–1878)

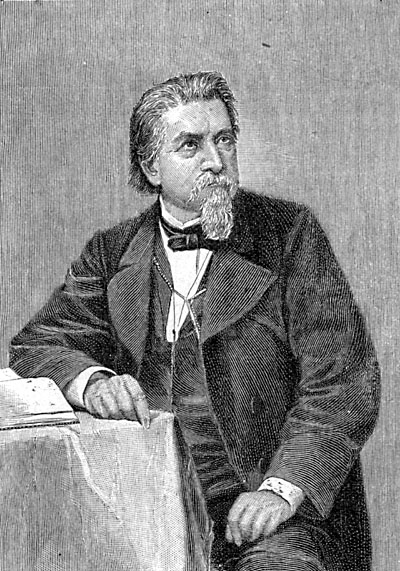
Karl Gutzkow

Karl Ferdinand Gutzkow (17 March 1811 in Berlin – 16 December 1878 in Sachsenhausen) was a German writer and dramatist who promoted political and social reformism. He studied philosophy and theology with Georg Wilhelm Friedrich Hegel and Friedrich Schleiermacher, and his early works, like the novel Maha-Guru, Geschichte eines Gottes (1833), were satirical. His 1835 novel Wally, die Zweiflerin led to his imprisonment and suppression, marking the start of the Young Germany movement. His plays, especially Uriel Acosta (1847, based on Uriel da Costa), influenced German and Yiddish theater.

== Life and work ==
=== Upbringing and education ===
Born to a poor Berlin war-office clerk, Gutzkow may have rebelled against his father's strict pietism in his later agnosticism.

He began studying philosophy and theology with Hegel and Schleiermacher at the Friedrich Wilhelm University of Berlin in 1829. For the Augsburg Confession's tercentenary in June 1830, Hegel delivered an address in Latin as rector, declaring that Protestant Prussia reconciled religion, philosophy, and ethical life (Sittlichkeit).

But news of the July Revolution in Paris stirred radical politics. After Frederick William III's birthday celebration, Gutzkow wrote:

Hundreds of students thronged behind the barrier in front of which sat the professors, the government officials, the military. [...] The crown prince smiled, but everyone who read the newspapers knew that in France a king had just been knocked off his throne. [...] Hegel [...] announced the winners of the academic competitions [...]. I myself heard with one ear that I had won the prize in the philosophical faculty over six competitors, and with the other about a people who had overthrown a king, about the thunder of cannons and about thousands who had fallen in battle [...]. Scientific academic study lay behind me, history before me.

Hegel saw "catastrophe" in the Revolutions of 1830 but reaffirmed his dialectic before dying in 1831. Amid the Vormärz reaction, spurred also by the populist Erweckungsbewegung (Awakening), his followers split, and some were radicalized. Right Hegelians' and centrists' reformism often slid into accommodationism or fundamentalism. The Young Hegelians sought divinity in human life and community, veering into revolutionary, atheistic humanism. A "theologizing Paul", Gutzkow wrote that his bent for the Hegelian "Damascus experience" faded as he became a "philosophizing Saul".

=== Early literary career ===
Gutzkow began his literary career at university with the 1831 periodical Forum der Journalliteratur, leading Wolfgang Menzel to hire him to co-edit Stuttgart's Literaturblatt. But Menzel, wrote David Friedrich Strauss, tried "to muzzle the spirit of the times".

Gutzkow continued studies across the University of Jena, Heidelberg University, and the Ludwig-Maximilians-Universität München, publishing Briefe eines Narren an eine Närrin (1832, Hamburg) anonymously. He wrote a fantastic, satirical Tibetan romance novel, Maha-Guru, Geschichte eines Gottes (1833, Stuttgart, Cotta), and founded the Deutsche Revue in Frankfurt, where he was living in 1835.

=== Punishment ===
Influenced by Strauss's Life of Jesus and French ideas like Henri de Saint-Simon's theory of the emancipation of the flesh, Gutzkow's novel Wally, die Zweiflerin (1835) was a critique of revelation and marriage, exalting its heroine's agnostic, emancipated views. The German Federal Assembly promptly banned his writings and those of Heinrich Heine, Heinrich Laube, Ludolf Wienbarg, and Theodor Mundt by December 1835. This arguably marked the start of the Young Germany movement, whose literary reformers anticipated the German revolutions of 1848–1849.

The Assembly sentenced Gutzkow to three months' imprisonment, barred him from editing in the German Confederation, and officially suppressed his work. This only amplified it. During his Mannheim imprisonment, Gutzkow wrote his treatise Zur Philosophie der Geschichte (1836). He returned to Frankfurt upon release and moved to Hamburg in 1837.

=== Theater and further novels ===
He began a new literary phase with the tragedy Richard Savage (1839), which was staged across Germany. The comedies Zopf und Schwert (1844), Das Urbild des Tartüffe (1847), and Der Königsleutnant (1849) entered the Germany repertory, as did the blank verse tragedy Uriel Acosta (1847). He moved to Dresden in 1847 to succeed Ludwig Tieck as literary adviser to the court theater.

He continued writing novels with Seraphine (1838), Blasedow und seine Söhne (a satire on the educational theories of the time), and Die Ritter vom Geiste (1850–1852), arguably the first German social novel. Der Zauberer von Rom is a social allegory of Roman Catholic life in southern Germany.

After Die Ritter vom Geiste, Gutzkow founded the journal Unterhaltungen am häuslichen Herd (1852–1865, after Dickens' Household Words).

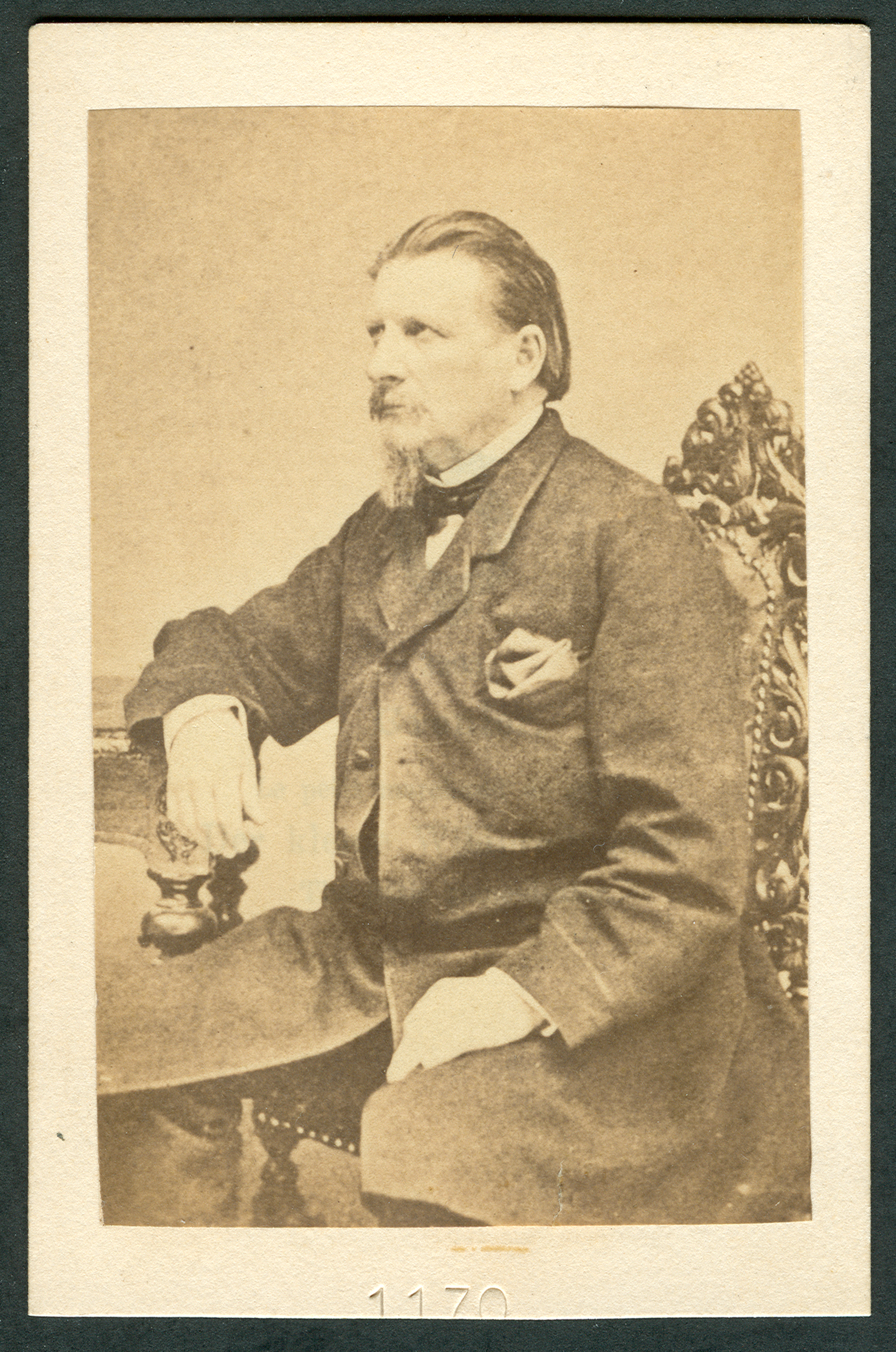
About 1860: "Carte de visite" of Gutzkow, No. "1170" probably made by an anonymous copyist

=== Later life ===
An 1864 epileptic seizure reduced his theatrical work, but he wrote the historical novels Hohenschwangau (1868) and Fritz Ellrodt (1872), plus Die Söhne Pestalozzis (1870, based on Kaspar Hauser) and the autobiographical sketches Lebensbilder (1870–1872). After another seizure, Gutzkow visited Italy in 1873 and then retired to the countryside near Heidelberg before returning to Frankfurt, where he died on 16 December 1878.

== Legacy ==
Gutzkow was among the first Germans to try to make a living by writing. He promoted the emancipation of the Jews in works like Uriel Acosta, which was translated to become a Yiddish theater staple. A reformer rather than a revolutionary, he grew more conservative with age and fell into neglect by 1910. His polemical work reflected generational struggles and shaped German thought.

=== Adaptations ===
His five-act comedy Zopf und Schwert (1844) was twice adapted: the 1926 film Sword and Shield by Aafa-Film, and Edmund Nick's 1940 operetta Über alles siegt die Liebe (Love Conquers Everything) to Bruno Hardt-Warden's libretto.
