= Elise Richter =

Austrian philologist

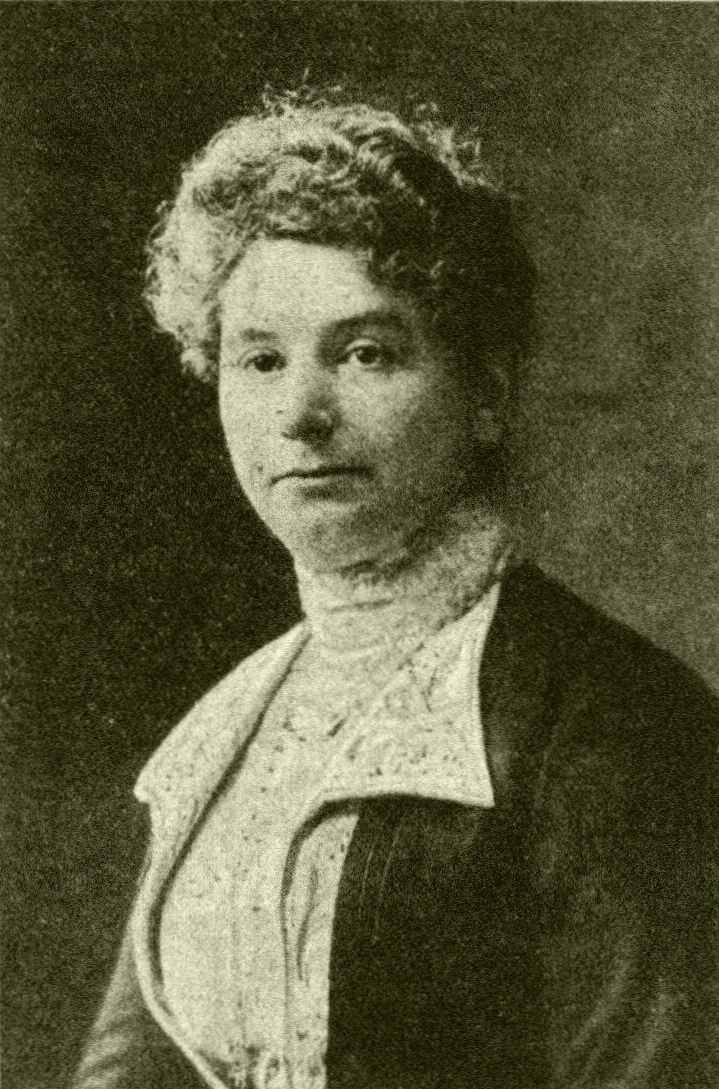
- Elise Richter, Wiener Bilder (in German), 18 September 1907.
- Born: 2 March 1865; Vienna, Austria
- Died: 21 June 1943 (aged 78); Theresienstadt Ghetto, Terezín, Czechoslovakia

Signature
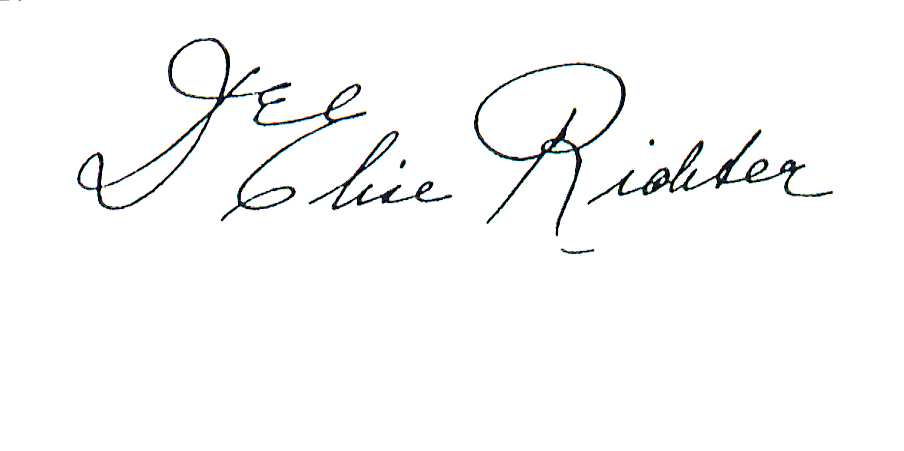

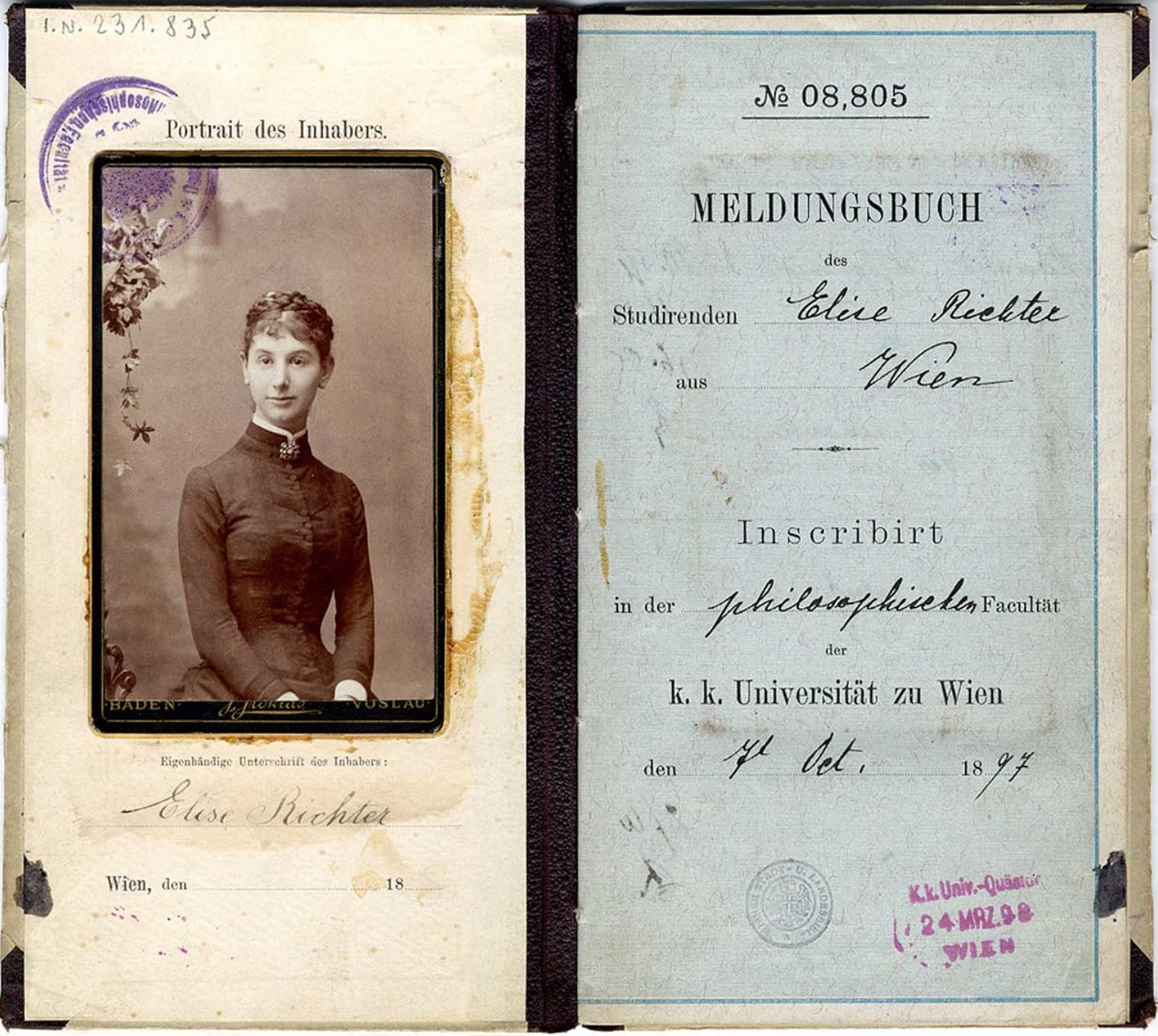
Elise Richter's student record book (Meldungsbuch) showing her matriculation as a philosophy student with her signature, Vienna University, 7 October 1897.

Elise Richter (2 March 1865 – 23 June 1943) was an Austrian philologist, specialising in Romance studies, and university professor. She was the first woman to achieve the habilitation at the University of Vienna(which is equivalent to being accepted as a full badge member of the German-speaking research community), the first female associate professor and the only woman at any Austrian university before World War I to hold an academic appointment. Persecuted like all other members of her family, by Nazi officials during World War II, she was deported to the Theresienstadt concentration camp in German-occupied Czechoslovakia in October 1942, and was murdered there, like her English PhD holder sister Helene. Elise was killed in June 1943, half a year after her sister.

== Biography ==
Born in Vienna, Austria, on 2 March 1865, to a middle-class, non-practicing Jewish family, Elise Richter was the daughter of Emilie Richter and Maximilian Richter, the chief physician of the Austrian Southern Railway Company. Her sister Helene Richter, four years older than Elise, became known as an anglicist and theatre scholar, writing about and translating English literature and drama. Elise Richter developed rheumatoid arthritis as a young woman, and was confined to bed for a year during her early 20s. The two women grew closer, following the deaths of their mother and father, respectively, in 1889 and 1891. Traveling together, they also encouraged each other to continue their respective academic pursuits.

As girls were excluded from formal higher education at the time, Richter and her two sisters (one of them died at a young age) were initially educated at home by the family's Prussian governess. During the 1890s, Helene and Elise Richter audited university courses with special permission from certain professors. It was not until 1896 that girls were admitted to the Matura examination (general university entrance qualification), which Elise Richter passed the following year, at the age of 32. Then she enrolled at the University of Vienna as a student of Classical, Indo-European and Romance philology under Adolph Mussafia and Wilhelm Meyer-Lubke, and then became one of the first women ever to be awarded a Doctorate from that university in 1901. That degree was awarded summa cum laude.

In 1905, she became the first woman to receive the habilitation for her work on Romance languages. Two years later, she became the first female Privatdozent (assistant professor) at the University of Vienna. Her inaugural lecture on "the history of indeclinables" was moved to another lecture hall to avoid disruption by militant Catholic and German nationalist students who took offense not only at Richter's gender but also at her Jewish roots. In 1921, she became the first woman in Austria to be appointed as an untenured professor (außerordentlicher Professor). However, she never received an ordinary professorship.

In their home in the "cottage quarter" of Währing, Elise and Helene Richter hosted a weekly salon for intellectuals and artists, starting in 1906. Among their regular guests were the women's rights activists Marianne Hainisch and Rosa Mayreder, music critic Max Kalbeck, and Burgtheater director Hugo Thimig. In 1911 both Richter sisters were baptised in Vienna's Lutheran City Church. Beginning in 1920, she chaired the Association of Austrian Academic Women (Verband der Akademikerinnen Österreichs). In 1922, Elise Richter founded the Austrian Federation of University Women.

After the 1938 Anschluss, and the introduction of Nazi anti-semitic policies in Austria, which excluded people of Jewish origin from public life, Richter was denied access to the university's library, dismissed from her post, denied pension support in her old age, and prohibited from visiting museums and other cultural institutions. In addition, her personal library, which held 3,000 items, and other possessions were confiscated. She and her sister, Helene, who lived with her, were then deported to the Theresienstadt concentration camp on 9 October 1942, on Transport IV/13, number 598. Helene was 81 when she died there on 8 November 1942. Elise was 78 when she died there on 21 June 1943.

The Elise Richter Program of the Austrian Science Fund (FWF), which provides financial support for female postdoc researchers aiming for a professorship, is named in her honour.

== Selected writings ==
- On the Development of the Romance Word Order from the Latin [German title: Zur Entwicklung der romanischen Wortstellung aus der lateinischen] (Max Niemeyer Verlag, Halle (Saale): 1903)
- Foreign Word Knowledge [German title: Fremdwortkunde] (Teubner, Leipzig: 1919)
- Phonics: Introduction to Phonetics [German title: Lautbildungskunde. Einführung in die Phonetik] (Teubner, Leipzig/Berlin: 1922)
- How We Speak. Six Popular Lectures [German title: Wie wir sprechen. Sechs volkstümliche Vorträge] (Teubner, Leipzig: 1925)
- The Development of Modern French [German title: Die Entwicklung des neuesten Französischen] (Velhagen & Klasing, Bielefeld/Leipzig: 1933)
- Contributions to the History of Romanisms I: Chronological Phonetics of French Up to the End of the 8th Century [German title: Beiträge zur Geschichte der Romanismen I. Chronologische Phonetik des Französischen bis zum Ende des 8. Jahrhunderts] (Niemeyer, Halle (Saale): 1934)
- Smaller Writings on General and Romance Linguistics [German title: Kleinere Schriften zur allgemeinen und romanischen Sprachwissenschaft] (Institute for Linguistics at the University of Innsbruck, Innsbruck: 1977)
- Sum of Life [German title: Summe des Lebens] (WUV-Universitätsverlag, Vienna: 1997)
