= Cemetery of the March Fallen =

Cemetery in Volkspark Friedrichschain, Berlin

Coordinates: 52.5246°N 13.4367°E

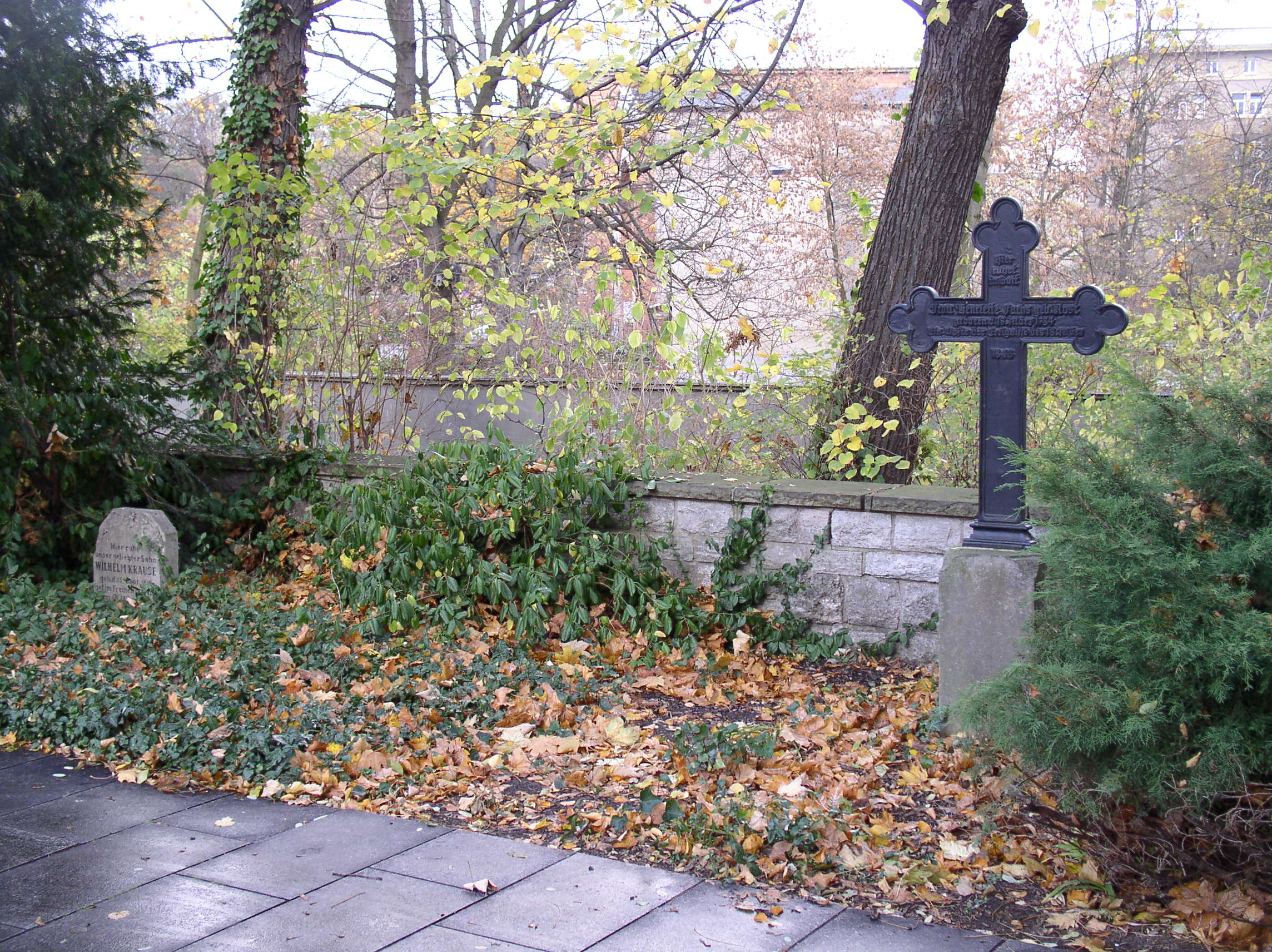
Cemetery of the March Fallen (graves)

The Cemetery of the March Fallen is a cemetery in Volkspark Friedrichshain in the Berlin district of Friedrichshain. It was laid out for the victims of the March Revolution of March 18, 1848, the March Fallen. In 1925, the Berlin architect Ludwig Hoffmann redesigned the park and gave it its existing three-sided shape. Further redesigns took place in 1948 and 1957.

After the November Revolution of 1918, the first Berlin soldiers who died in the uprising were also buried here, as commemorated by the bronze statue of the Red Sailor by Hans Kies, which was erected in 1960.

In 1948, a memorial stone with the names of those who died in the March uprising was erected to mark the cemetery's 100th anniversary. Today there are still 18 gravestones, three iron grave crosses, a stele and two cast iron memorials. The cemetery of the March soldiers is now a memorial and garden monument.

A total of 255 March soldiers and 33 soldiers of the November Revolution rest in the cemetery.

== History ==
=== Preparations and burial in 1848 ===
The first people to be buried in the Cemetery of the March Fallen were 183 civilian victims of the barricade battles of the March Revolution on March 18, 1848. They were buried on March 22, 1848, on Lindenberg, the highest elevation of the Volkspark, which was still under construction at the time and was also popularly known as Kanonenberg. The Berlin City Council only decided to build the new cemetery on a 2.3 hectares (5.7 acres) site the day before the burial based on a motion by city council member Daniel Alexander Benda. It was intended that the fallen soldiers should also be buried here alongside the civilian victims. The decision for a joint burial had already been widely discussed and mostly rejected by the population, but in the end the military decided not to make the bodies of the dead soldiers available. The two windmills that existed at the time were to be demolished for the construction of the burial site. In addition, a memorial was to be erected in the cemetery, which was not yet part of the Berlin city area at the time, and another in the city. Despite this decision, only one mill was demolished and the area was considerably smaller as a result. The second mill burned down in 1860. The burial of the soldiers did not take place here either, but only on March 24 at the Invalids' Cemetery in Berlin-Mitte. The planned monuments were not erected either. The cemetery was originally laid out in a square with diagonal paths leading to a surrounding path along which the graves were located. A traffic circle with a summer lime tree stood at the center of the cemetery.

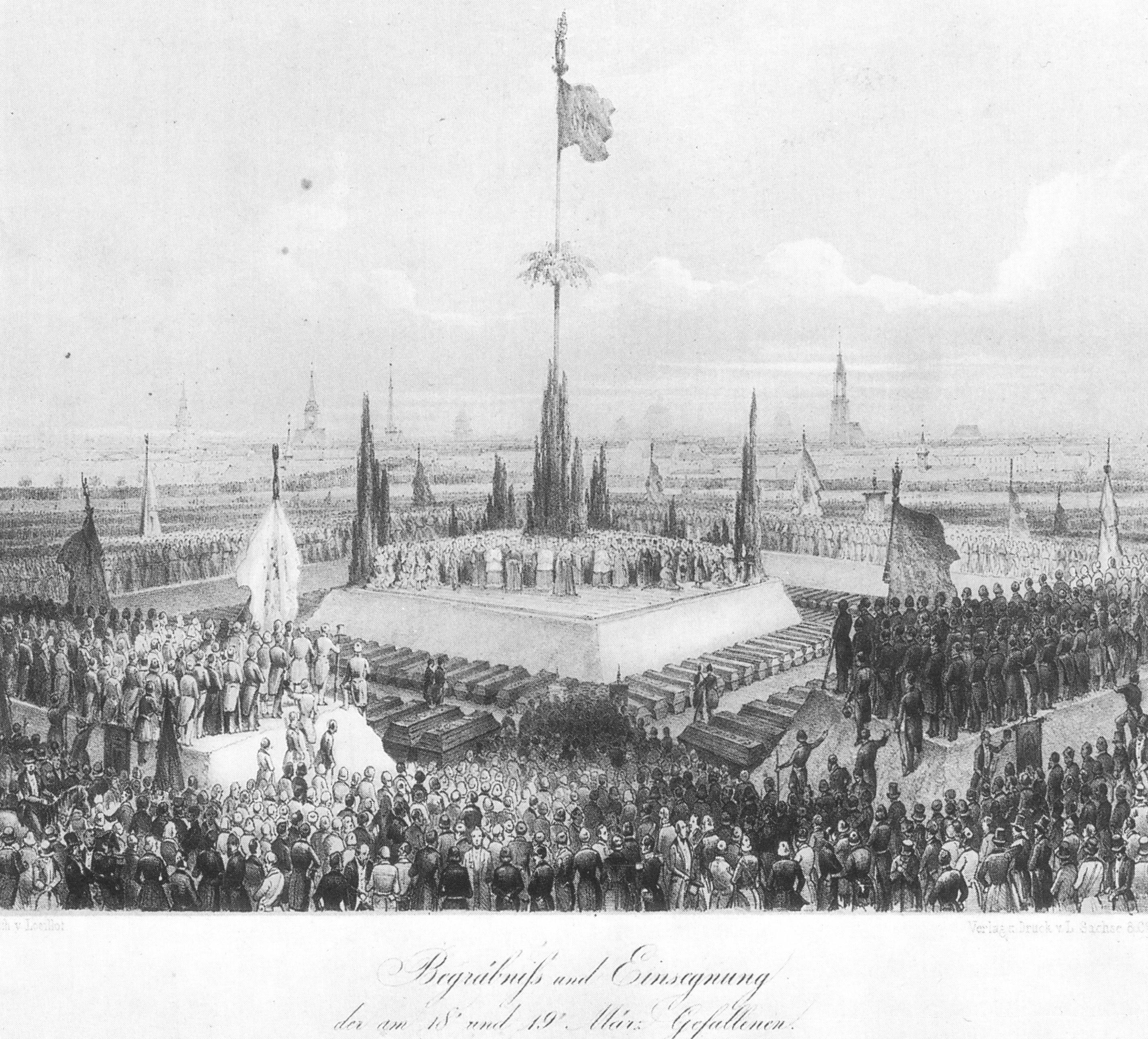
Funeral and blessing of those killed on March 18 and 19, 1848, lithograph by Wilhelm Loeillot de Mars, 1848.

After an opportunity for a private farewell on March 21, the funeral took place on March 22. On this day, a procession was prepared and the whole of Berlin, including the Berlin City Palace and the Scharnhorst and Blücher memorials in the city center, were decorated in red, gold and black. Helpers decorated the coffins of the fallen with flowers from the royal garden. The March Fallen (1848) were laid out on the Gendarmenmarkt. 100,000 people gathered, and Adolf Glaßbrenner even spoke of 300,000. The relatives of the dead gathered for a Protestant service in the New Church, the church next to the German Cathedral on the Gendarmenmarkt. Those present sang the hymn "Jesus, My Confidence", after which they left the church.The Protestant preacher of the Neue Kirche Adolf Sydow, the Catholic chaplain Johann Nepomuk Ruhland from the St. Hedwig's Cathedral and the rabbi Michael Sachs held a short consecration speech in front of the door, an interreligious meeting which the Königlich privilegierte Berlinische Zeitung commented on as follows: "it was a historic moment which is as unprecedented in history as this whole ceremony itself".

The procession from the New Church to the cemetery consisting of 20,000 participants and 3,000 stewards, was about 7.5 kilometres (4.7 miles) long and lasted four hours. The Königlich privilegirte Berlinische Zeitung (later Vossische Zeitung), whose entire editorial staff attended the funeral, noted that the symbols carried "seemed to embody the entire history of our fatherland". The participants carried flags from other cities as well as those of individual trades in the city. There were hardly any medals or uniforms. On the way across Berlin's Schloßplatz, Prussian King Friedrich Wilhelm IV took off his helmet on the balcony, as previously planned.

In the cemetery itself, Adolf Sydow preached first, followed by Assessor Georg Jung, the spokesman for the Berlin Democrats, who also gave a speech. In the following weeks, other victims of the fighting who succumbed to their injuries were buried on this site. The total number of graves rose to 254.

=== 1848–1849 ===
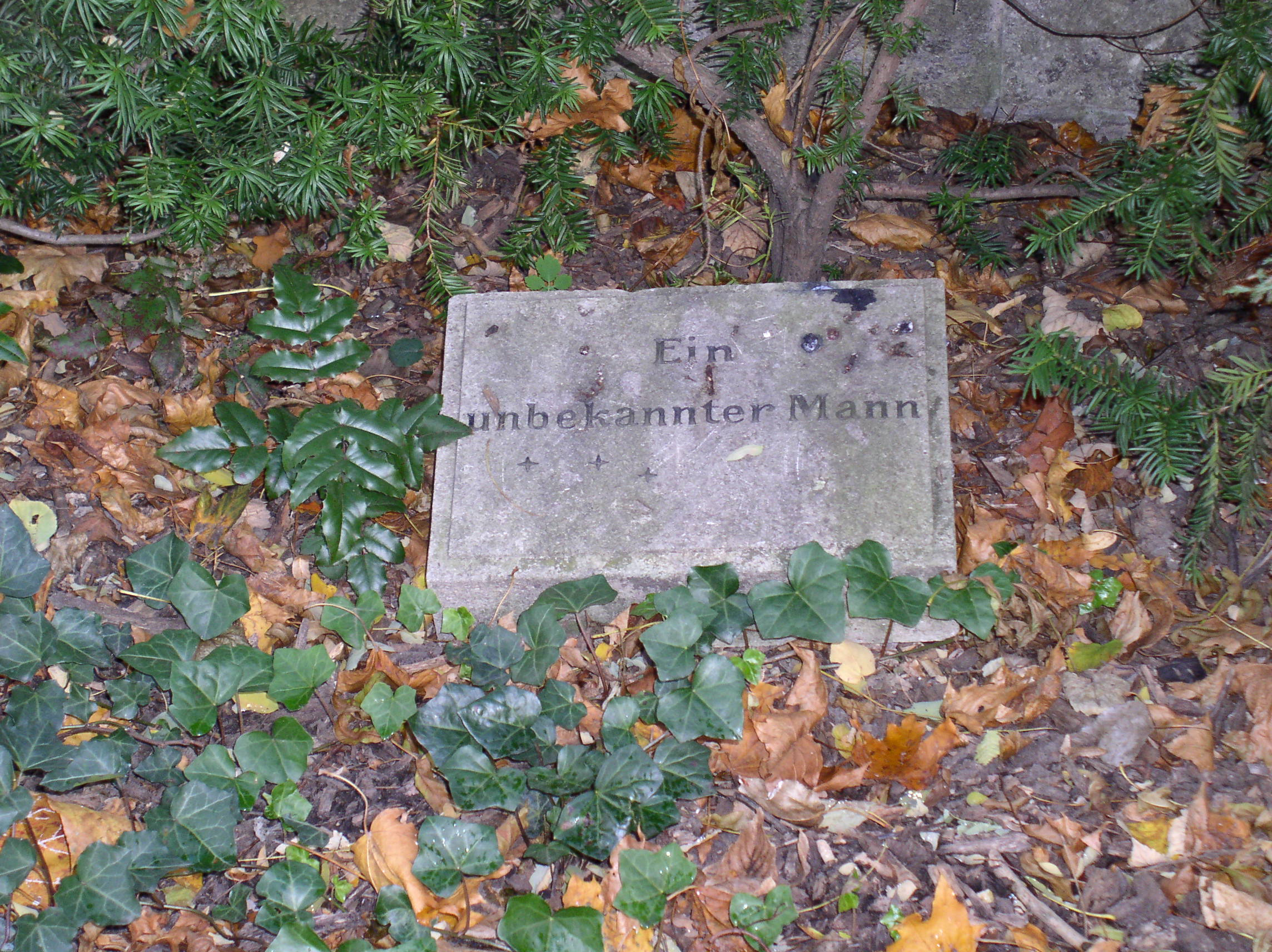
Grave of an unknown man

The Cemetery of the March Fallen became a symbol of the German democratic movement from 1848 onwards. The site regularly served as an important memorial and demonstration site.

In June 1848, around 100,000 Berlin students took part in the first demonstration at the graves at this site. They wanted to commemorate the dead and at the same time warn those in power not to hastily reverse the changes brought about by the revolution. A letter from the students to the magistrate makes this clear:

"The purpose of the procession is to react to the widespread disapproval and condemnation of a revolution to which we owe our political rights, and to honor the names of the fallen, crowned by their wounds."

As early as March 25, 1848, a public announcement was published in several Berlin newspapers asking for donations and designs for a monument in the cemetery, for which the foundation stone was to be laid on the anniversary of the revolution. This announcement was addressed to the entire German people, pointing out that the March Revolution had a national significance and that Berliners were therefore not solely responsible. The money raised by the committee to erect the monument was administered by the merchant and shoe manufacturer F. H. Bathow. However, as this committee was not officially authorized, Bathow was forced by the police to hand over the money. The whereabouts and the amount of money collected remained unclear; according to contradictory reports, it was either deposited at the municipal court in 1854 or transferred to the pension fund of the policemen.

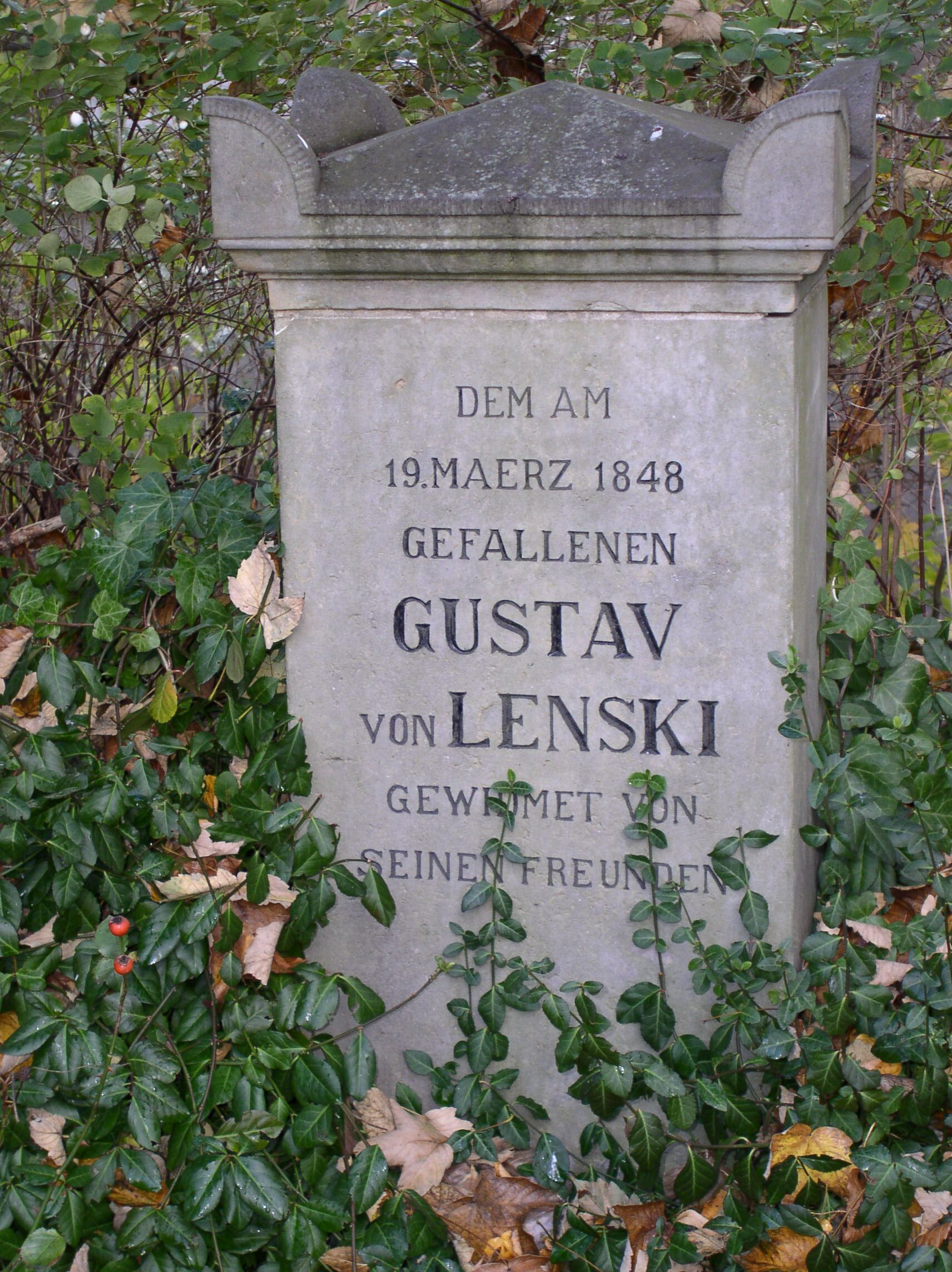
Gravestone

Due to the confiscation of the money, there was no memorial to mark the anniversary of the revolution. By this date, not all graves had even been fitted with simple wooden crosses and the city government did not want to finance them. So the Berliners provided the about 60 missing crosses through a spontaneous collection between March 18 and 22, 1849.

Due to the political situation leading up to the first anniversary of the revolution, both the magistrate and the city council anticipated new uprisings in Berlin. For this reason, the military and police forces were massively reinforced. The Königlich privilegirte Berlinische Zeitung wrote on March 20, 1849:

"The city itself already presented a completely warlike appearance on the 17th, and every measure that could be taken in a state of siege had been taken. In every village and suburb around Berlin significant numbers of troops were camped (...). Friedrichshain in front of the Landsberg Gate was particularly heavily garrisoned. The few buildings located at the entrance to Friedrichshain were filled with soldiers down to the smallest rooms (...) Large units of dragoons patrolled every road, and Friedrichshain was also guarded by a division of guards.

"The city itself already presented a completely warlike appearance on the 17th, and every measure that could be taken in a state of siege had been taken. In every village and suburb around Berlin significant numbers of troops were camped (...). Friedrichshain in front of the Landsberg Gate was particularly heavily garrisoned. The few buildings located at the entrance to Friedrichshain were filled with soldiers down to the smallest rooms (...) Large units of dragoons patrolled every road, and Friedrichshain was also guarded by a division of guards."

Despite this military and police presence, thousands marched to the graves of the March Fallen on March the 18th. Most of them were workers. The graves had already been decorated with flowers the previous night and employees of Borsigwerke had erected a steel pillar at each of the four corners of the cemetery, which was topped with two torches. In the afternoon of the day, the feared clashes between demonstrators and the security guards did indeed occur, but the outcome was relatively mild. When Otto von Bismarck visited the cemetery in September 1849, he wrote bitterly to his wife:

"Yesterday I was with Malle [Malwine von Arnim-Kröchlendorff, Bismarck's sister] in Friedrichshain, and I could not even forgive the dead. My heart was full of bitterness against the worship of the graves of these criminals, in which every inscription on the crosses boasts of 'freedom and justice', a mockery of God and man. I say to myself that we are all sinners, and God alone knows how to tempt us; but my heart swells with poison when I see what these murderers have made of my fatherland, and how Berliners still worship their graves today."

=== From 1850 to 1900 ===
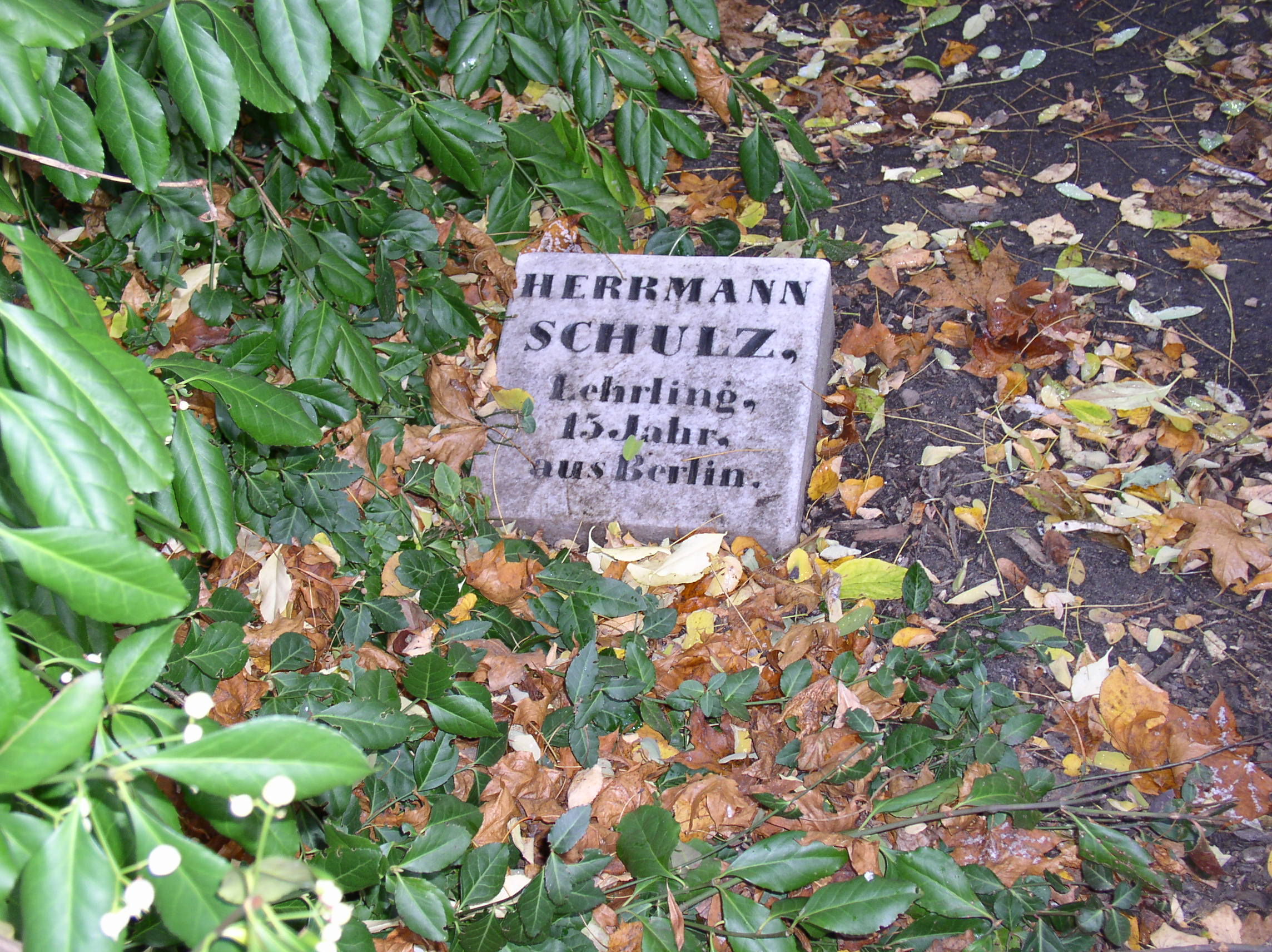
Gravestone

To avoid riots in the following years, the Prussian State Ministry banned people from entering the cemetery on March 18, 1850, and on the anniversaries of the following years. As early as March 17, 1850, all entrances were cordoned off by police forces. On the same day and the following day, workers arrived at the park and attempted to enter the cemetery grounds to lay flowers and wreaths. The commemorative events were then held in the surrounding garden pubs, and there were also clashes between the police and the demonstrators that year.

On March 20, 1850, the Königlich privilegierte Berlinische Zeitung announced that the cemetery of the March Fallen was to be levelled and the graves relocated. The site was to make way for a new railroad station. However, this announcement was never carried out, and so many workers came to the cemetery on March 18, 1851. This day again ended in riots, which this time did not end without casualties. By March 18, 1852, all paths to the cemetery, except the main path from Landsberger Tor, had been planted with flowers and thus made impassable. However, in the run-up to the Cologne communist trial that year, 10,000 demonstrators came to the park and once again the day ended in violence. From 1853, the entire park was cordoned off with a high wooden fence, later a bar fence. By this means, the authorities prevented a gathering at the cemetery that year.

The planned construction of the station was not reported again until February 1854, after the construction of an orphanage on the edge of the park was rejected in 1853 on the grounds that the sight of the cemetery could remind young people of the March Revolution of 1848 daily and thus incite them to rebellion once again. Once again, the cemetery was not relocated, and until 1856, many people gathered at the cemetery every year to commemorate the revolution and the fallen. In a letter dated October 22, 1856, the Chief of Police of Berlin asked the city magistrate to make access to the cemetery impossible by planting a thorny hedge, "with the intention of allowing the site to fall into oblivion if possible". The magistrate rejected these plans and once again suggested relocating the dead, which the police commissioner agreed to on the condition that this should be done as quietly as possible.

In October 1857, the press and thus the public became aware of the magistrate's plans through relatives of the dead, from whom the magistrate wanted to obtain permission to relocate the dead in return for money. In September 1858, the magistrate presented a plan to the city council for an immediate relocation, which the council approved. As a result, an unknown number of coffins were also dug up, but a complete relocation did not take place. On May 15, 1861, the Königlich-Privilegierte Zeitung announced that access to the cemetery was once again permitted without restriction.

Between 1868 and 1874, the [[Friedrichshain municipal hospital|Friedrichshain municipal hospital]] was built on Landsberger Allee near the cemetery. Since then, the cemetery itself has been located directly next to the hospital wall, separated from the rest of the Volkspark by the access road to the hospital's main entrance.

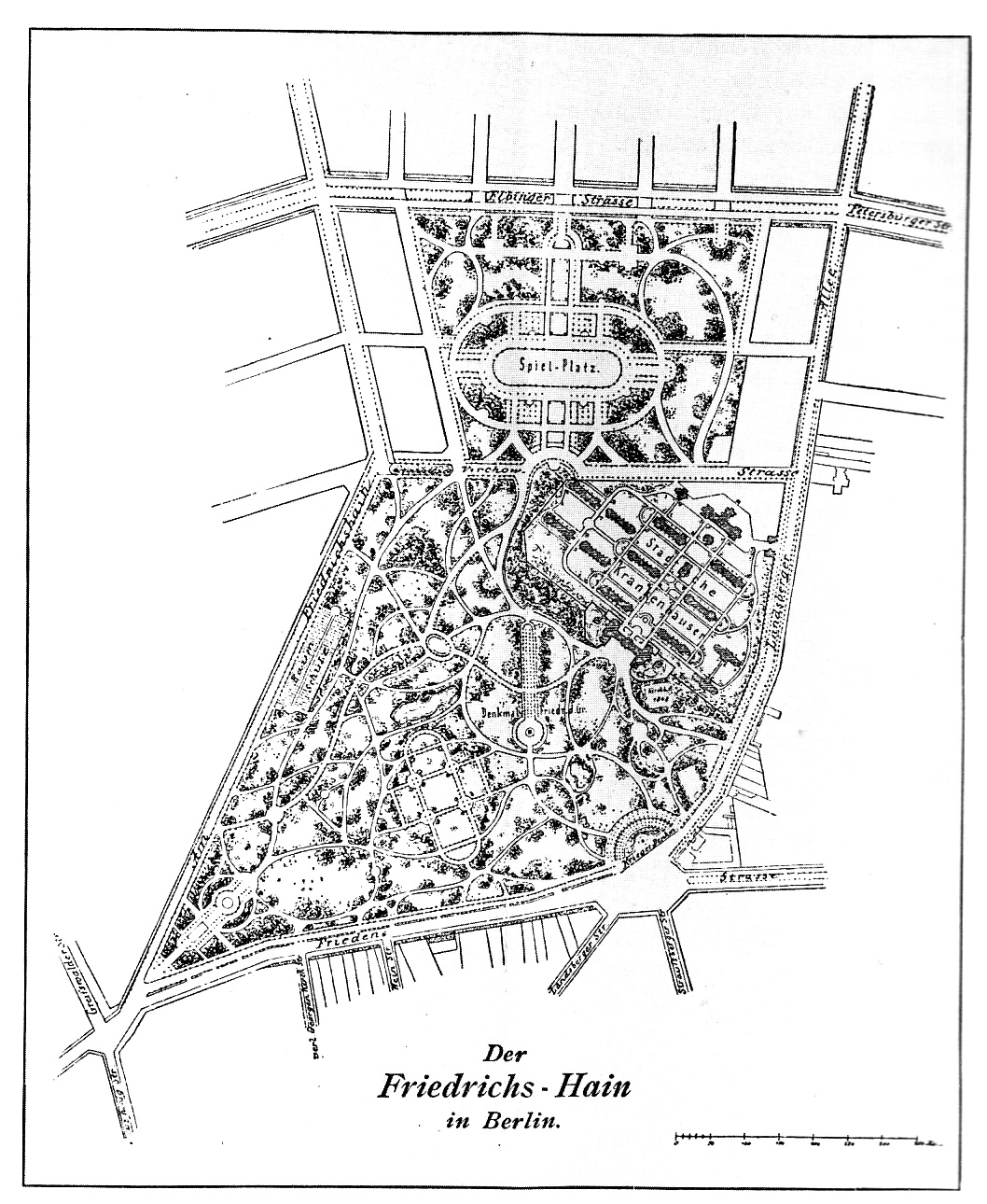
Plan of the Volkspark after the hospital was built, 1875.

The next important date for the cemetery was March 18, 1873, the 25th anniversary of the revolution. At the same time, this day became a day of remembrance for the Paris Commune of 1871. Large crowds gathered at the Cemetery of the March Fallen, and the anniversary again led to major clashes between demonstrators and the police. The latter cleared the park by force in the late afternoon. In the years that followed, the cemetery continued to be visited by thousands of people every year, mainly Communist and Social Democratic workers. Local politicians and the Social Democratic faction of the Reichstag also repeatedly honored the dead by laying wreaths.

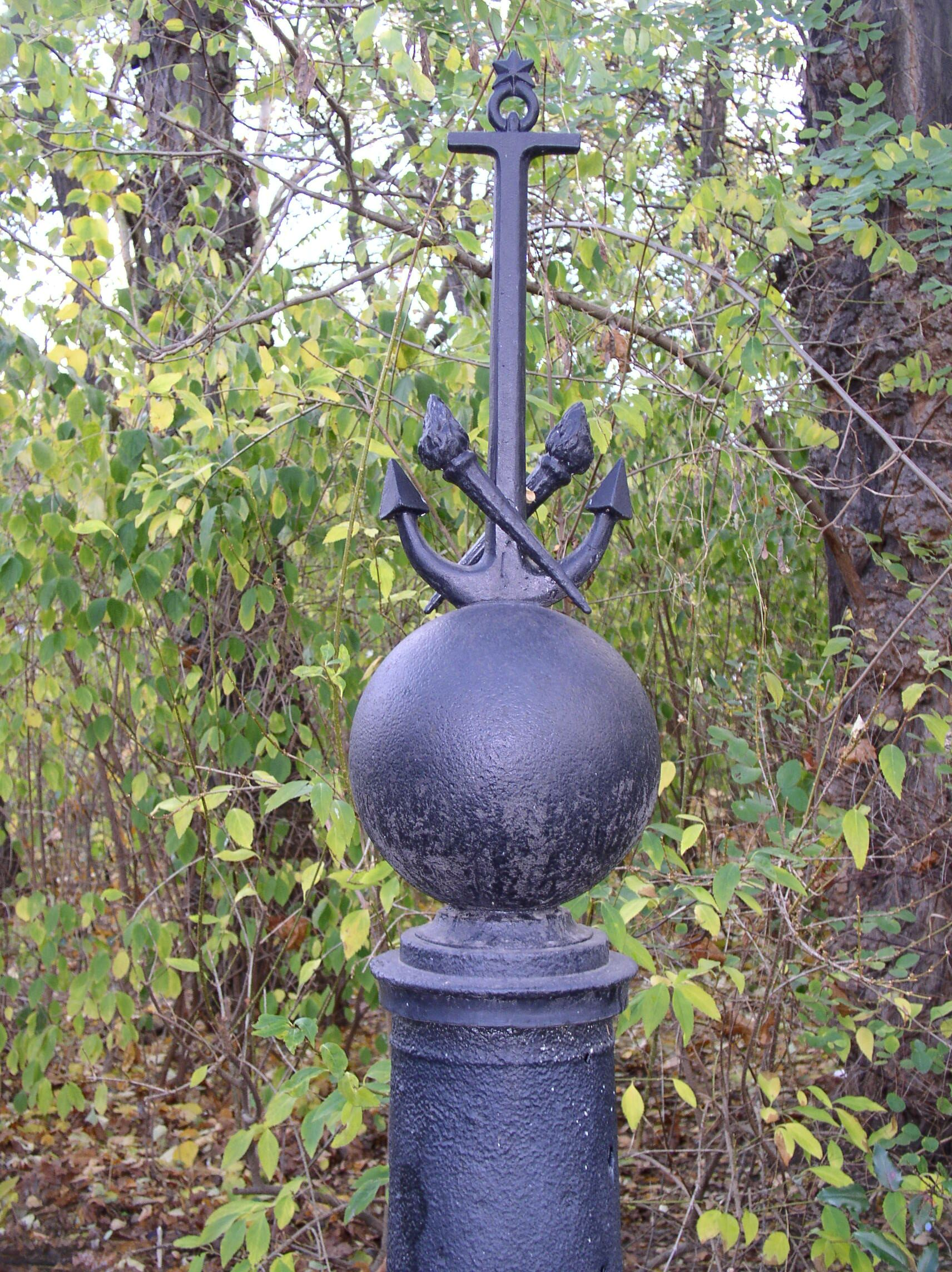
Grave stele

Before the 50th anniversary in 1898, there was a dispute between the city authorities and the Berlin police headquarters over the redesign of the cemetery; historian Helke Rausch describes the behavior of the monarch and the authorities as "massive obstruction". In March 1895, the General Workers' Association of Berlin had revived the plans of 1848 in a resolution and demanded that a memorial be erected to the "fighters" of 1848. The city councillors approved the erection of a representative entrance portal with an iron gate in the cemetery, for which Ludwig Hoffmann submitted a design, while the Chief President of the province of Brandenburg, Heinrich von Achenbach, expressed reservations if the Berlin Magistrate were to participate in honoring the insurgents. In January 1898, the Berlin Magistrate rejected the proposal under pressure from the Council of Ministers, against which the city councillors protested and appealed to the Higher Administrative Court without success, so that the "reactionary" view of the authorities prevailed. In 1899, the dispute arose again when the placement of a memorial plaque at the entrance portal was suggested instead of a monument. The police headquarters now refused permission to build on the grounds that "the building was intended to pay tribute to the March fallen buried there, i.e. a political demonstration to glorify the revolution, which cannot be permitted for public order reasons".

A tribute to those who died in March was still rejected, and the cemetery was restored to an "orderly" state without taking into account its historical peculiarity. In relation to these disputes about the memorial, the inscription on the wreath of the Social Democratic group of city councillors stated:

"You have erected your own monument."

The Marxist historian Franz Mehring empathetically summarized the history of the cemetery in his 1897/1898 History of Social Democracy:

"[The bourgeoisie] betrayed [the work of March 18], and its guilty conscience allowed the cemetery where the fallen people's fighters had been laid to rest to run wild. Rust began to gnaw at the letters and numbers on the crosses, and the grass blew over the sunken grave mounds. But then came the day when the awakened class consciousness of the proletariat understood the historical significance of the March Revolution and consecrated the gravesite of Friedrichshain anew."

=== From 1900 to 1945 ===
In 1908, the 60th anniversary of the cemetery coincided with the political dispute over voting rights in Germany. In March, the Social Democrats passed their resolution on this issue at the graves of the March Fallen as the March Resolution, in which they called for universal, equal, secret and direct suffrage in Germany. Wreaths were laid at the cemetery and several thousand people gathered there. The ribbons on the wreaths in particular drew attention to the demands of the people and especially to the demands for voting rights. One of the wreaths laid by the editors of Vorwärts newspaper carried the dedication "To the first suffrage fighters". Around 60 ribbons were removed by the police because of the inscriptions, resulting in visitors clashing with the police.

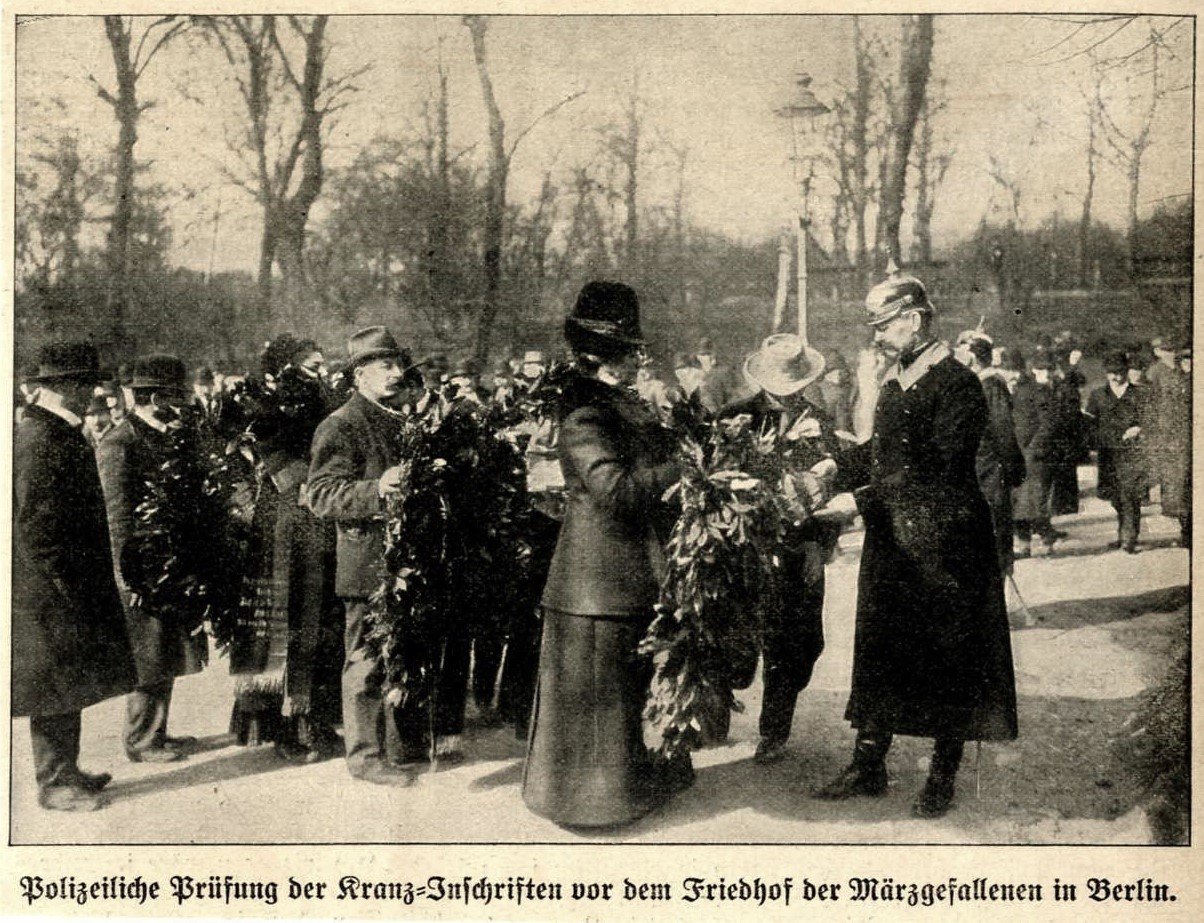
Police inspection of the wreath inscriptions in front of the cemetery (1912)

On March 18, 1917, the traditional annual workers' procession to the graves was combined with a demonstration of solidarity with the February Revolution in Russia.

In November of the following year, 1918, there was also a revolution in Germany, which became known as the November Revolution. On November the 20th, eight people who died in these uprisings were buried in a separate burial ground at the Cemetery of the March Fallen in order to emphasize and underline the connection between the two revolutions. The memorial service, at which several speakers emphasized the parallels between the two revolutions, took place on Tempelhofer Feld; several thousand people took part in it and in the funeral procession that followed. An honorary company of the Alexander Regiment led the procession, followed by a large crowd of wreath bearers, representatives of the Reich, state and city authorities, the Social Democratic Party and the trade unions. Next came the carriages with the coffins and the relatives of the fallen, as well as a special company of sailors. The workers followed with red and black flags. When the first coffin was lowered into the pit at around 3 p.m., Emil Barth (USPD) gave the eulogy for the dead on behalf of the Council of the People's Deputies; Luise Zietz (USPD) and Karl Liebknecht also spoke.

"Let us not deceive ourselves. The political power of the proletariat, which was seized on November 9th, has already largely vanished and continues to disappear hour by hour (...) Hesitation delays death - the death of revolution" — Karl Liebknecht

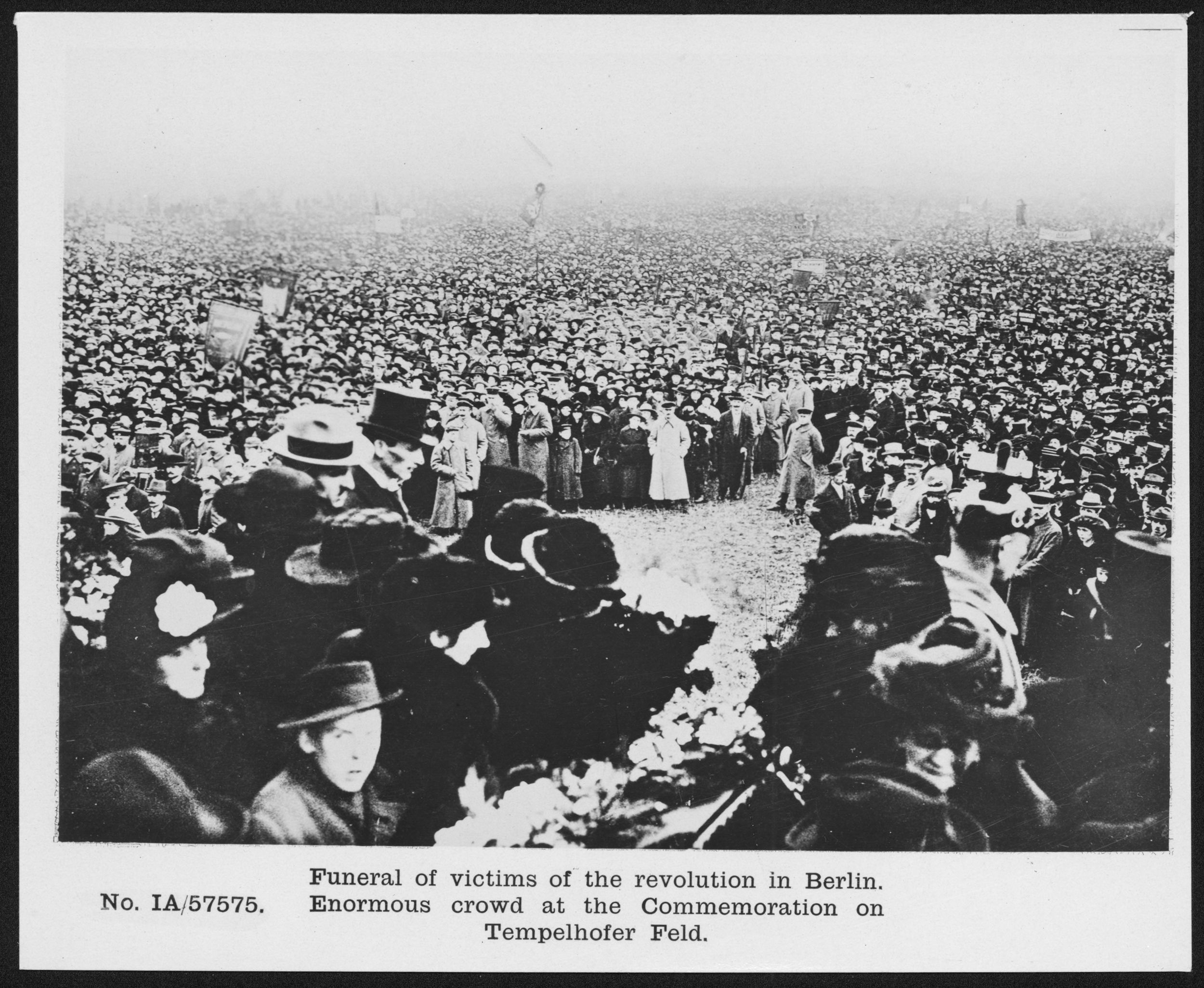
Crowd at the funeral service on Tempelhofer Feld, November 1918

From December 6th–11th, 1918, there were conflicts with counter-revolutionary troops in Berlin. In a violent clash on December 6th in the area of Invalidenstraße, 16 revolutionaries were killed, including members of the Red Soldiers' League (see Roter Frontkämpferbund). Willi Budich, a leading member of the Spartacus League and one of the two chairmen of the Soldiers' League, was wounded. The victims of this attack were also buried in the cemetery on December 21st. On December 24th, government troops attacked the People's Naval Division, which was stationed in the Berlin City Palace and was considered Spartacist. Eleven people lost their lives in the successful defensive battles of the sailors, who were buried in a third pit in the Cemetery of the March Fallen on December the 29th.

In January 1919, the KPD and USPD requested the burial of 31 people who had died in the Spartacus Uprising in the Cemetery of the March Fallen, including Karl Liebknecht. As the magistrate refused to honor them, these victims of the revolution were buried at the Zentralfriedhof Friedrichsfelde.

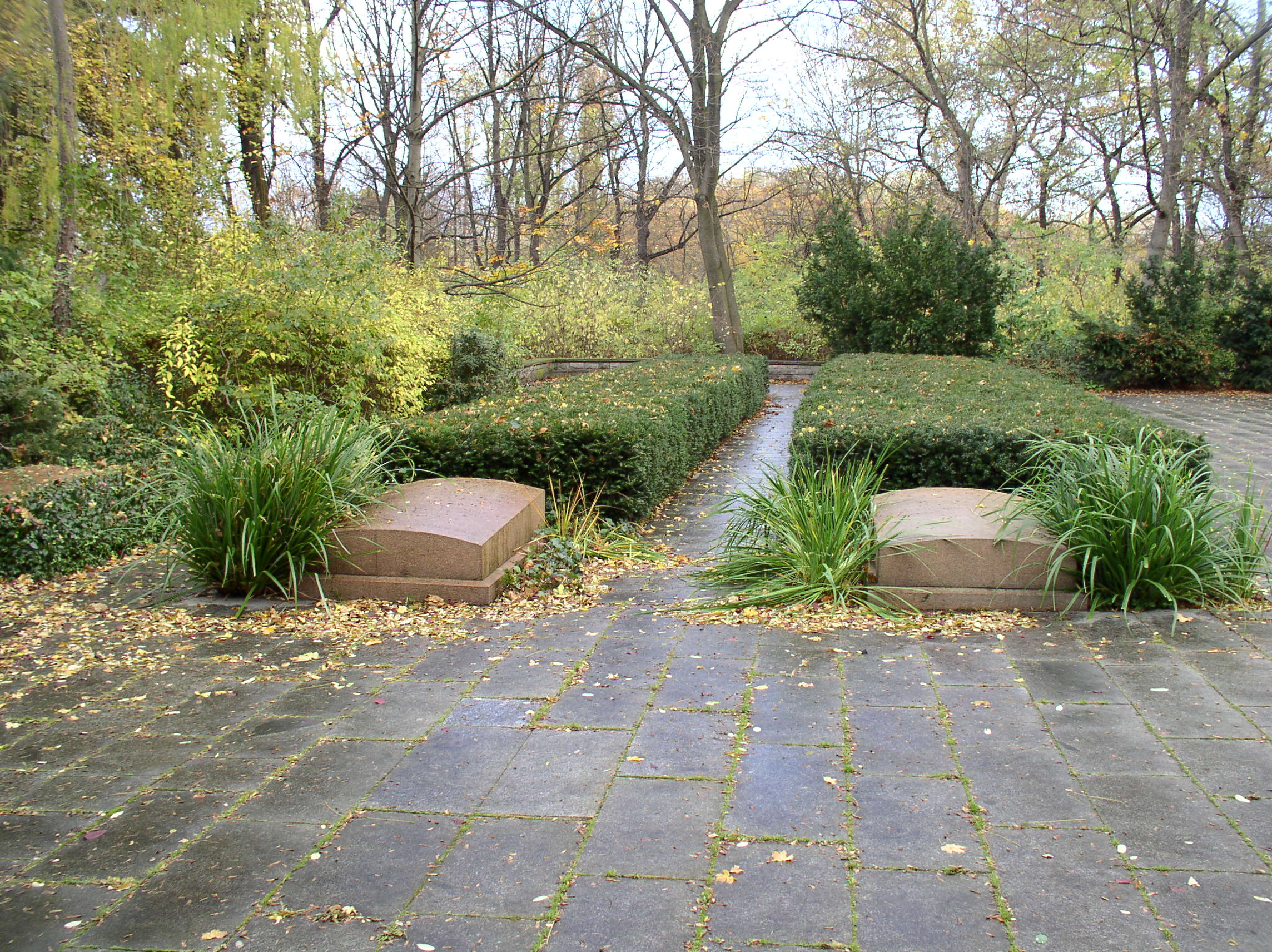
Memorial plaques for the victims of the November Revolution

During the Weimar Republic, workers as well as representatives of the SPD, the KPD, the trade unions and the Reichsbanner Schwarz-Rot-Gold visited the cemetery as a memorial site every year.

At the beginning of the 1920s, the Friedrichshain district council decided, with a majority of SPD and KPD votes, to "give the cemetery a dignified appearance". This mainly related to the redesign of the entrance gate according to Ludwig Hoffmann's design. On October 11, 1925, Hoffmann's new gate was inaugurated as his last construction project and with a rally in honour of the "fighters for German freedom" (speech by district mayor Mielitz). According to the newspaper Vorwärts, this took place with the participation of a "large crowd"; before the unveiling of the new portal, 10,000 men from the Berlin comradeship of the Reichsbanner marched past it with lowered flags and to the beat of drums. At this point, Hoffmann had already been out of office for a year as Berlin's city planning officer. The gate was forged from iron and supported on both sides by pillars, on each of which the figure of the Greek god of death Thanatos was kneeling and naked, leaning on a lowered torch. Vorwärts wrote:

The simple, almost austere moderation of republican views is also expressed in the new gate, which (...) finally opens the entrance to the small cemetery of the March Fallen in Friedrichshain in a dignified form. A simple portal made of hard stone and tough iron, designed by an artist, will be handed over to the public.

In addition, the remaining gravestones and crosses were arranged on three sides of the cemetery in the manner that can still be seen today (2023).

During the National Socialist regime, the cemetery received little attention and was forgotten by large sections of the population. Publicly honoring the fallen of the revolutions could lead to political persecution, and even the social democratic and communist opponents of the Nazis stayed away out of fear.

=== After 1945 ===
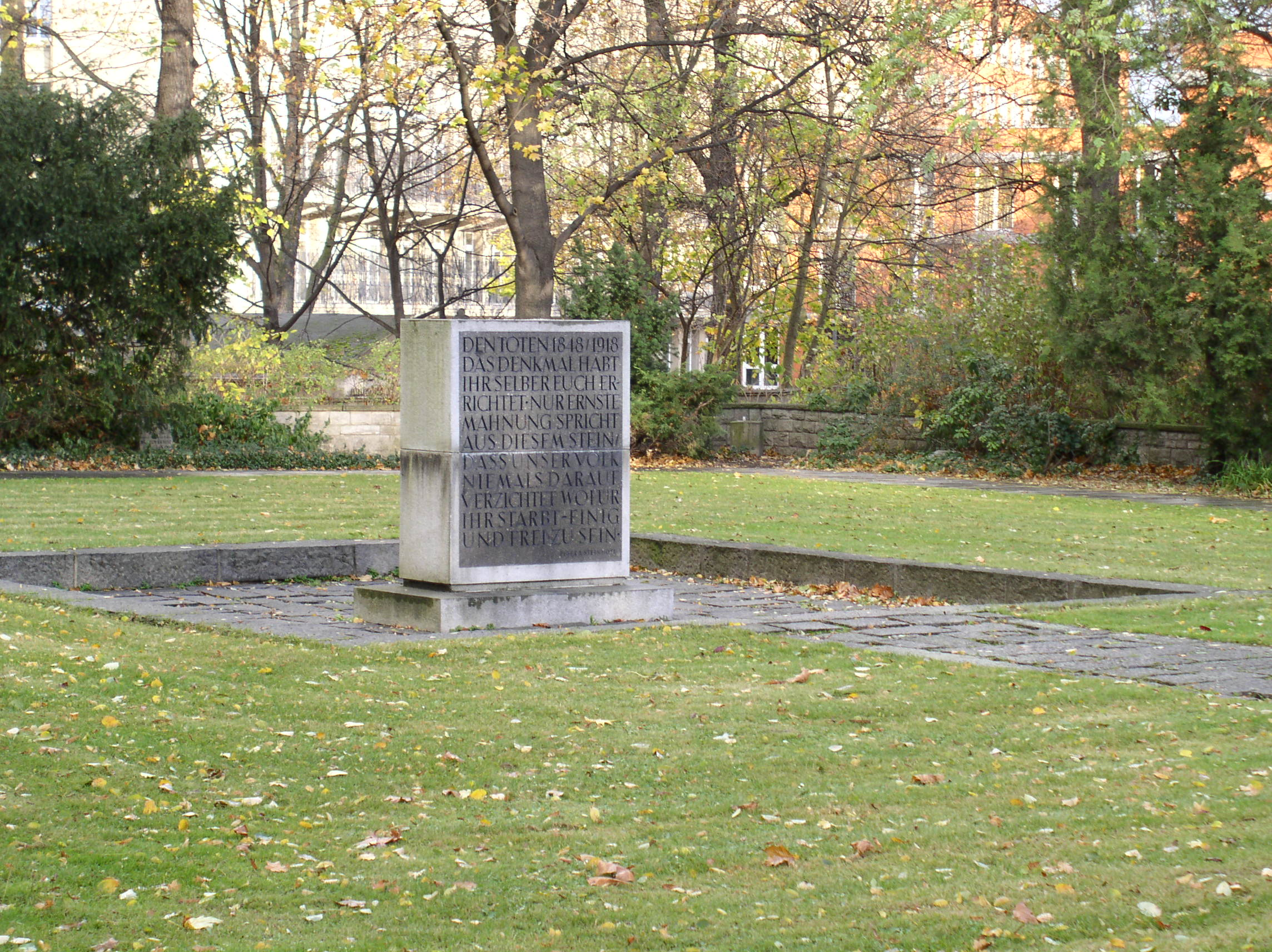
Memorial stone (front)

After the end of World War II, the cemetery also came back into the public eye; it was now located in the Soviet sector of the city. In 1947, the Berlin magistrate drew up a plan to commemorate the 100th anniversary of the revolution and, above all, to redesign the cemetery. The Friedrichshain district office proposed removing the cemetery's narrow paths in favor of a central meeting place and erecting a memorial stone in the center. The decorated gate based on Hoffmann's design still existed at this time and was to be replaced by a simpler version during this redesign, but instead only the ornamental figures were removed at first: "Only the entrance gate requires a minor redesign, with the removal of its less attractive figurative decoration."

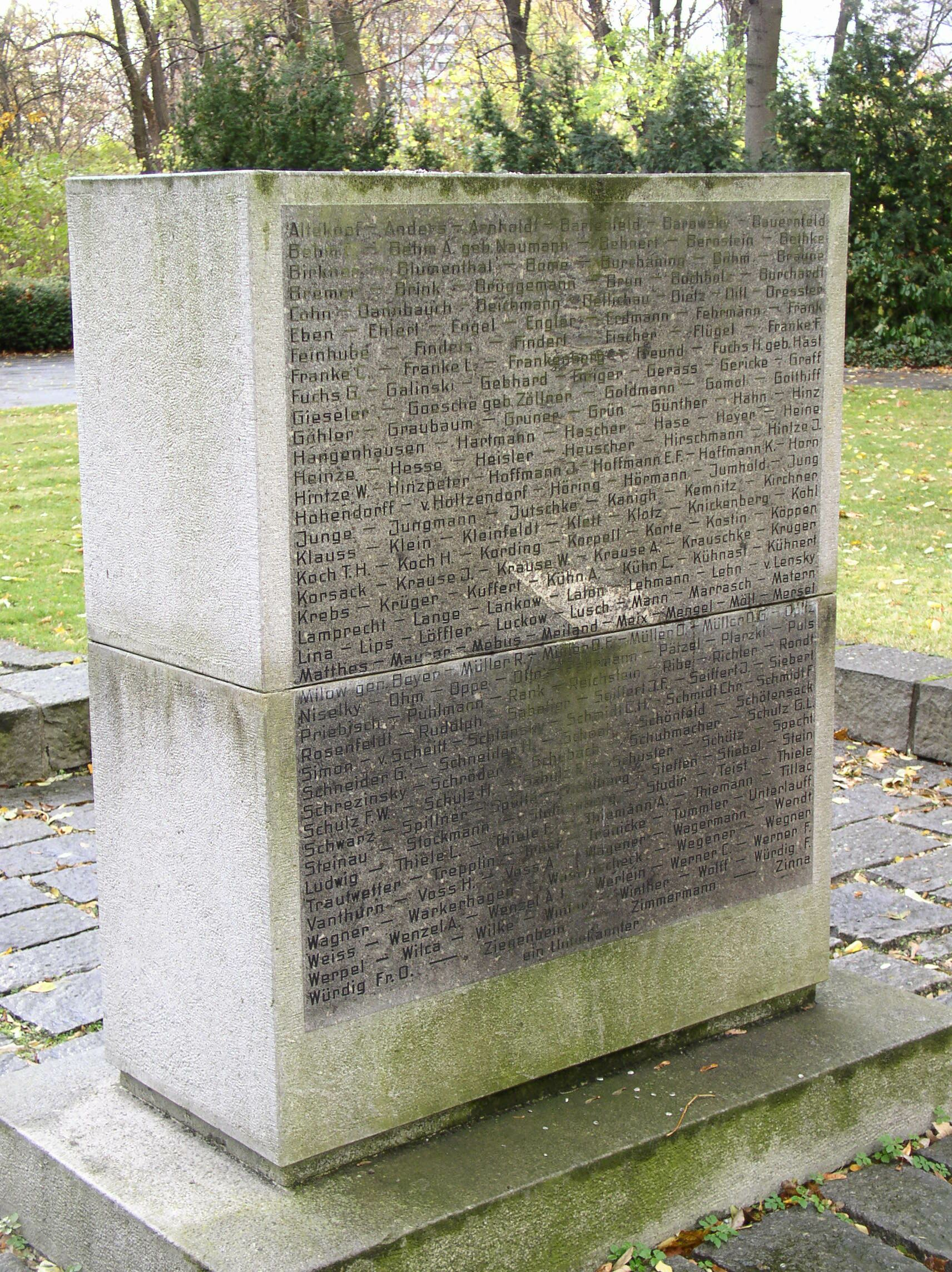
Memorial stone (back)

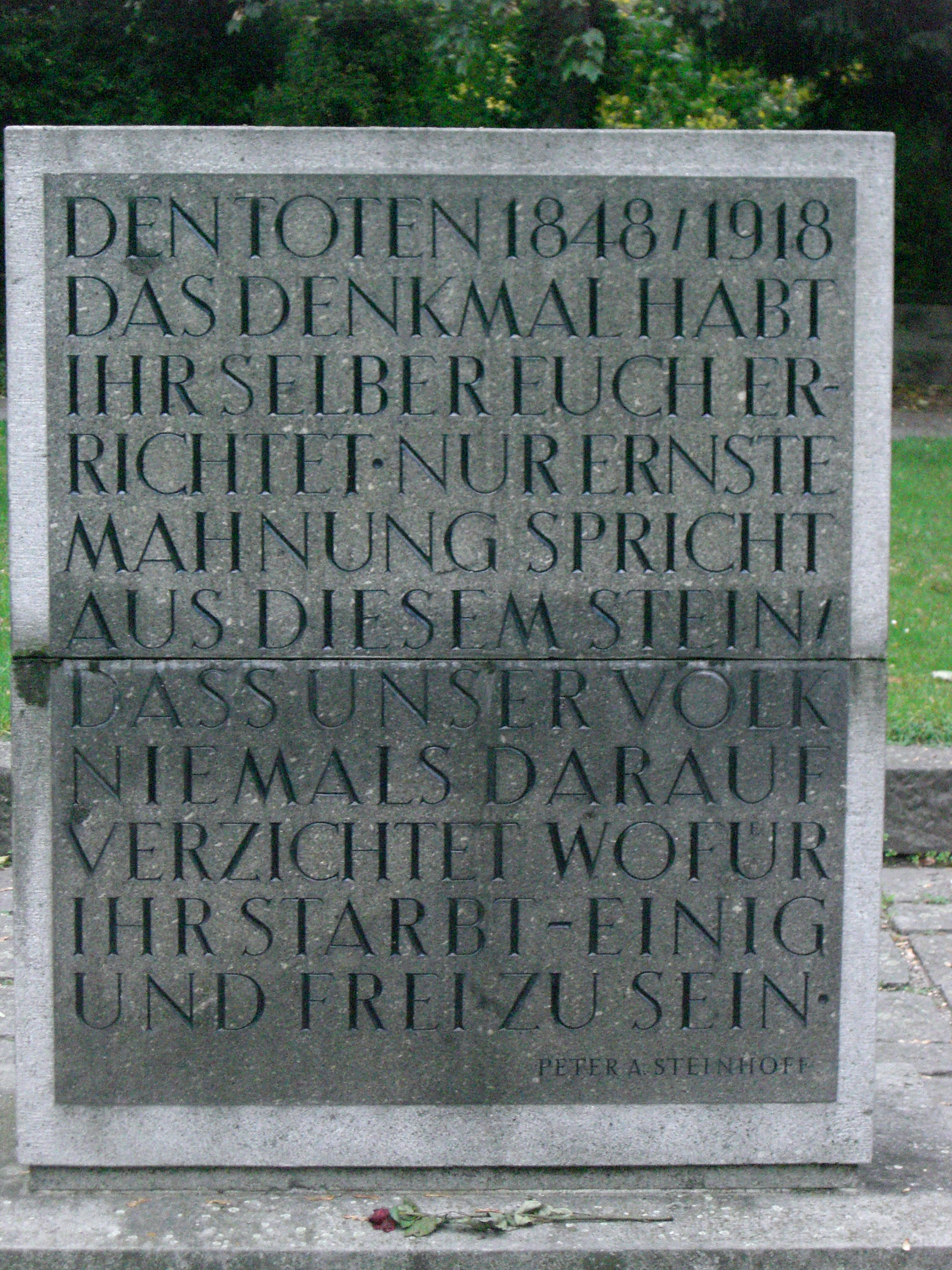
Inscription on the memorial stone (front)

On March 18, 1948, the new memorial stone was unveiled in a central location at the beginning of the celebrations. The area had been planted with grass and a narrow path led to the memorial stone. The back of the stone is inscribed with the names of 249 soldiers who died in March 1848, while the front bears the text by Peter A. Steinhoff:

To the dead of 1848/1918. You erected the memorial yourselves – Only a serious warning speaks from this stone / That our people will never renounce the cause for which you died – to be united and free.

The cemetery was redesigned again in 1956/57 in preparation for the 40th anniversary of the November Revolution. Under the direction of Franz Kurth, the western section was fitted with three gravestones as memorials to the victims of 1918. The gate was also replaced by a new, four-meter-wide entrance gate facing Leninallee. In 1960, the bronze figure of the Red Sailor by Berlin sculptor Hans Kies was erected directly in front of the entrance. Larger than life, it represents an armed sailor of the November Revolution.

Throughout the GDR era, annual commemorations and wreath-laying ceremonies were held at the cemetery, but these rarely attracted much attention. Since 1979, the West Berlin initiative Aktion 18. März ('March 18 Action') has also organized an annual wreath-laying ceremony at the cemetery, which the GDR authorities did not like, but tolerated.

== Since 1990 ==
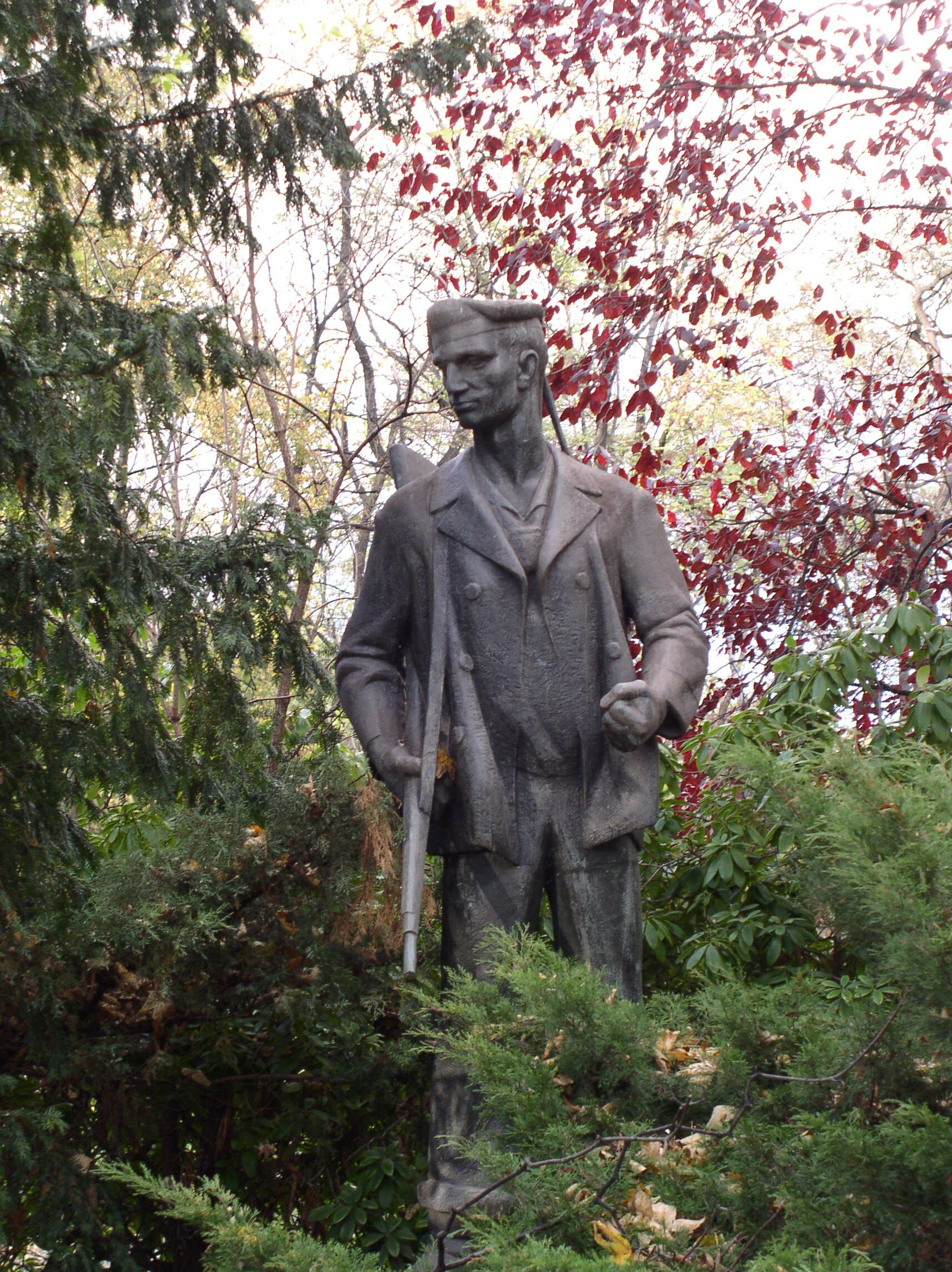
Red Sailor

Since 1992, commemorative ceremonies have been jointly organized by the responsible district office and the Initiative, at which the President of the House of Representatives of Berlin traditionally lays a wreath.

The Cemetery of the March Fallen is located in the southern part of Volkspark Friedrichshain and is one of its quietest parts due to its somewhat remote location. It is separated from the rest of the park by the access road to the hospital, Ernst-Zinna-Weg. This was named on March 18, 2000, after the journeyman locksmith Ernst Zinna, who died on March 19, 1848, as a result of the fighting. The cemetery is rectangular, has a size of about 30 by 40 metres (98 ft × 131 ft) and is surrounded by a low stone wall. 18 stone grave slabs, three iron grave crosses, a stele and two grave monuments have been preserved from the original cemetery. They are located in the three-sided surrounding beds, which have been planted with shrubs and trees. In the center of the grounds is the memorial stone unveiled in 1948, the back of which bears 249 names of those who fell in March, along with the words "An unknown".

Some of the names on the surviving gravestones differ from those on the memorial stone. The three gravestones for the victims of the November Revolution are located in the western part of the complex. While the one on the left is covered with a slogan by Karl Liebknecht and the one on the right with a slogan by Walter Ulbricht, the one in the middle bears 33 names of victims of the November Revolution, the most famous of whom is Erich Habersaath. He was the first Berlin victim of the November Revolution and was shot on November 9, 1918. The bronze sculpture of the Red Sailor stands on the south-western corner of the small wall surrounding the cemetery.

On 29 May 2011, an exhibition on the Berlin March Revolution and the history of the cemetery, organized by the Paul Singer Association, was opened in front of and inside the cemetery and continues to be operated and maintained by the association. A 30-meter-long green-painted sea container with a floor area of 60 square metres (650 sq ft) was set up in front of the cemetery to serve as an exhibition pavilion on the March Revolution and as an information office. The cemetery features information boards on the history of the cemetery arranged in a circle.

On September 3, 2018, a permanent exhibition on the November Revolution of 1918 opened on the occasion of its 100th anniversary. Due to the limited space in the container, the exhibition was closed in March 2023 and replaced by outdoor steles. The container is now used for special events

== Renovation of the cemetery from 2024 ==
To the east of the cemetery, a visitor center with four crossed glass cubes, a base made of recycled clinker bricks and a green roof is to be built on a 600 square metres (6,500 sq ft) site by the end of 2026, replacing the existing exhibition and container. The winning design in the competition was submitted by Berlin architects AFF Architekten. [Berliner Immobilienmanagement GmbH (BIM) purchased the required area from the neighboring Vivantes Hospital in Friedrichshain.

== See also ==
- List of cemeteries in Berlin
- Lists of cemeteries

== Bibliography ==
- Jung, Georg (1848). Rede am Grab (in German). Braunschweig: Universitätsbibliothek Johann Christian Senckenberg.
- Liebknecht, Wilhelm (1893). Zum 18. März und Verwandtes (in German). Nuremberg: Wörlein.
- Abraham, Heike (1988). Der Friedrichshain. Die Geschichte eines Berliner Parks von 1840 bis zur Gegenwart (= Miniaturen zur Geschichte, Kultur und Denkmalpflege Berlins. Band 27) (in German). Berlin: Kulturbund der DDR.
- Chod, Kathrin; Schwenk, Herbert; Weißpflug, Hainer (2003). Berliner Bezirkslexikon Friedrichshain-Kreuzberg (in German). Berlin: Haude & Spener. ISBN 3100294092.
- Czihak, Hans (1998). "Der Kampf um die Ausgestaltung des Friedhofes der Märzgefallenen im Berliner Friedrichshain". Demokratie, Liberalismus und Konterrevolution. Studien zur deutschen Revolution von 1848/49 (in German). Berlin: Walter Schmidt. pp. 549–561.
- Feustel, Jan (2001). Verschwundenes Friedrichshain. Bauten und Denkmale im Berliner Osten (in German). Berlin: Agit-Druck. ISBN 3935810016.
- Gaida, Oliver; Kitschun, Susanne (2021). Die Revolution 1918/19 und der Friedhof der Märzgefallenen (in German). Metropol. ISBN 978-3863315450.
- Hachtmann, Rüdiger (1997). Berlin 1848, Eine Politik- und Gesellschaftsgeschichte der Revolution (in German). Bonn: Verlag J.H.W Dietz Nachfolger.
- Hettling, Manfred (1998). Totenkult statt Revolution. 1848 und seine Opfer (in German). Frankfurt am Main: S. Fischer. ISBN 3100294092.
- Kitschun, Susanne; Lischke, Jürgen (2012). Am Grundstein der Demokratie, Erinnerungskultur am Beispiel des Friedhofs der Märzgefallenen (in German). Peter Lang. ISBN 9783631617052.
- Laser, Kurt; Podewin, Norbert; Ruch, Werner; Warnecke, Heinz (2016). Der Friedhof der Märzgefallenen im Berliner Friedrichshain – die Begräbnisstätte der Opfer zweier Revolutionen (in German). Berlin: Trafo. ISBN 9783864640964.
- Warnecke, Heinz (2010). "Gedenken an die Revolutionsopfer von 1848 und 1918. Zur Erinnerungskultur auf dem Märzgefallenenfriedhof im Friedrichshain seit 1918.". Demokratische Tradition und revolutionärer Geist. Erinnern an 1848 in Berlin (= Geschichtswissenschaft (in German). Herbolzheim: Centaurus. pp. 104–119. ISBN 9783825507626.
- Strotmann, Christine. "Vergessene Revolutionäre. Der Friedhof der Märzgefallenen". Militärgeschichte (in German). 1/2018: 10–13.
