= Adolf Wilbrandt =

German novelist and dramatist (1837–1911)

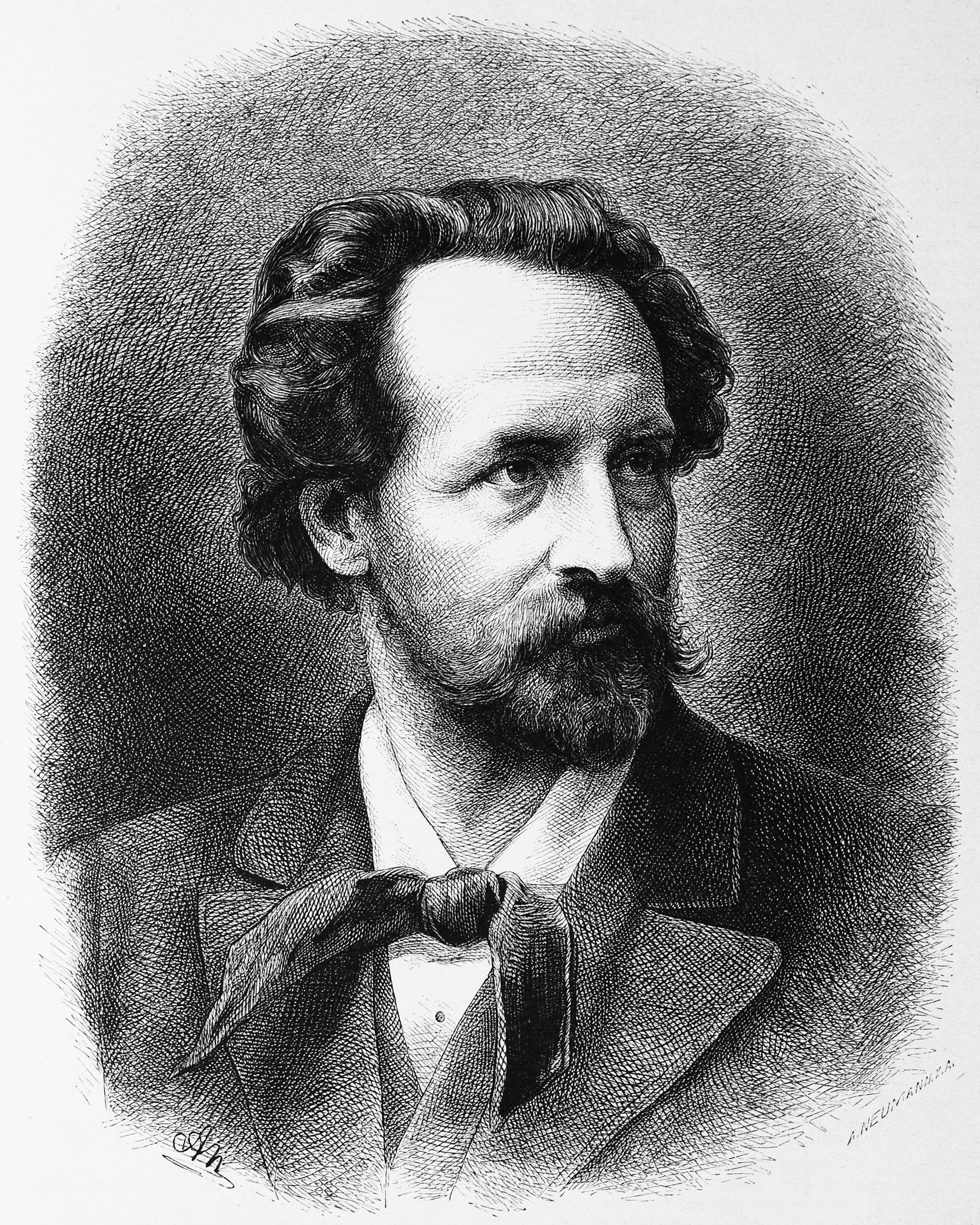
Adolf von Wilbrandt in 1882

Adolf von Wilbrandt (24 August 1837 – 10 June 1911) was a German novelist and dramatist.

== History ==
Wilbrandt was born in Rostock. His father was a professor at the University of Rostock. He received early education in his native town, and then entered the university and engaged in the study of law. He soon abandoned law in favour of philology and history, and continued these studies in Berlin and Munich. After taking the degree of Doctor of Philosophy, he joined the staff of the Süddeutsche Zeitung in Munich.

He travelled abroad for a time and in 1871 he settled in Vienna, where, two years later, he married the actress, Auguste Baudius. In 1881, Wilbrandt was appointed director of the Hofburg theatre in succession to Franz von Dingelstedt, an office he held until 1887. In this year he returned to his native town, and remained actively engaged in literary production. He died in Rostock on 10 June 1911.

Wilbrandt is distinguished both as a dramatist and novelist. His merits were acknowledged by the award of the Franz Grillparzer Prize on two occasions—in 1895 for the tragedy Gracchus der Volkstribun, and in 1890 for his dramatic poem Der Meister von Palmyra, while in 1878 he received the Schiller Prize for his dramatic productions.

== Works ==
=== Novels ===
- Fridolins heimliche Ehe (1875)
- Meister Amor (1880)
- Hermann Ifinger (1892)
- Der Dornenweg (1894)
- Die Osterinsel (1895)
- Die Rothenburger (1895)
- Hildegard Mahlmann (1897)

=== Plays ===
Tragedies

- Arria and Messalina (1874)
- Nero (1876)
- Kriemhild (1877)

Comedies

- Unerreichbar (1870)
- Die Maler (1872)
- Jugendliebe (1873)
- Der Kampf ums Dasein (1874)

Drama

- Die Tochter des Herrn Fabricius (1883).

He also published translations of Sophocles and Euripides (1866), Gedichte (Poems, 1894, 1889 and 1907), and a volume of Erinnerungen (Memoirs, 1905).

== Literature ==
- Franz Horch: Das Burgtheater unter Laube und Wilbrandt. Wien: Österreichischer Bundesverlag 1925.
- Victor Klemperer: Adolf Wilbrandt. Eine Studie über seine Werke. Stuttgart u.a. 1907.
- Eduard Scharrer-Santen: Adolf Wilbrandt als Dramatiker, München: Sachs u.a. 1912.
- Robert Wilbrandt: Mein Vater Adolf Wilbrandt. Berlin u.a.: Österreichischer Wirtschaftsverlag 1937.
