= Auguste Wilbrandt-Baudius =

German-Austrian actress and journalist (1843–1937)

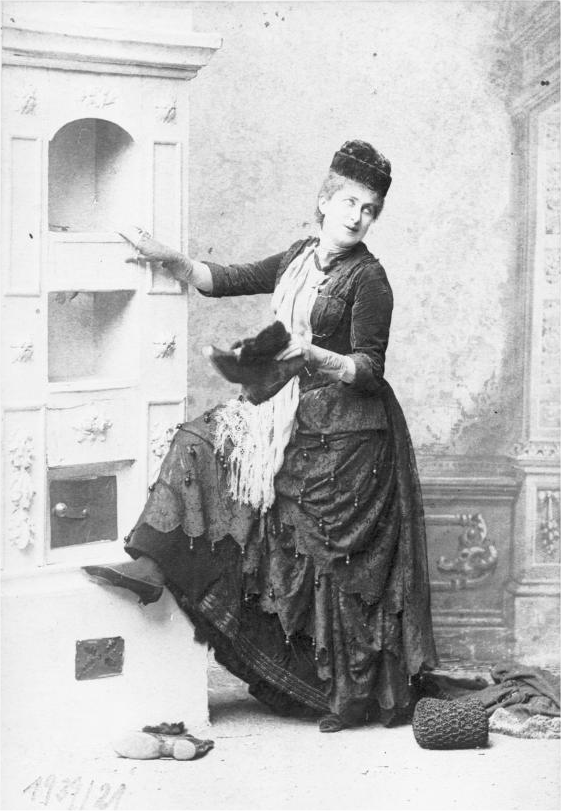
- Wilbrandt-Baudius in 1889
- Born: Auguste Baudius; 1 June 1843; Zwickau, Germany
- Died: 30 March 1937 (aged 93); Vienna, Austria
- Burial place: Vienna Central Cemetery
- Occupations: Actress; journalist
- Spouse: Adolf Wilbrandt (m. 1873; died 1911)
- Children: 1

Auguste Wilbrandt-Baudius (née Baudius; 1 June 1843 – 30 March 1937) was a German-Austrian actress and journalist. She was one of the most popular actresses in Vienna of her time.

== Early life ==
Auguste Wilbrandt-Baudius was born Auguste Baudius on 1 June 1843 in Zwickau, Germany. She received her first artistic lessons from her adoptive father, Karl Friedrich Baudius, an actor. Her mother's maiden name was Kriessich.

== Career ==
Wilbrandt-Baudius made her debut at the Stadttheater in Leipzig, Saxony, in 1857. She received an engagement in Breslau and was hired by Heinrich Laube to the Hof-Burgtheater (later Burgtheater) in Vienna in 1861, where she played until 1878. She preferred to perform in plays by Adolf Wilbrandt.

She left the Burgtheater in 1878 and spent some time in Paris before moving to Vienna in 1889, where she worked at the Theater an der Wien and later the Deutsches Theater in Berlin, the Hoftheater in Meiningen, and from 1893 at the Raimundtheater in Vienna. In 1898, she returned to the Burgtheather in Vienna as an actress and performed there until her death.

She was also active as a journalist and published in Pester Lloyd in Budapest. She wrote feature articles for the Neue Freie Presse and the Neue Wiener Tagblatt in Vienna.

== Personal life and death ==
Auguste Wilbrandt-Baudius married Adolf Wilbrandt in Vienna in 1873. He died on 10 June 1911 in Rostock, Germany. They had a son in 1875, Robert Wilbrandt, who became an economist.

She died in Vienna on 30 March 1937, aged 93. She is buried at the Vienna Central Cemetery.

== Select roles ==
- Juliet – Romeo and Juliet by William Shakespeare
- Annaliese – The Anna-Liese by Hermann Hersch
- Klärchen – Egmont by Johann Wolfgang von Goethe
- Gretchen – Faust by Johann Wolfgang von Goethe
- Käthchen – Das Käthchen von Heilbronn by Heinrich von Kleist
- Luise – Intrigue and Love by Friedrich Schiller
- Mirandolina – Mirandolina by Carlo Goldoni
- The Queen – The Glass of Water by Eugène Scribe
- Bianca – The Taming of the Shrew by William Shakespeare
- Polish Countess – The Clemenceau Affair by Alexandre Dumas the Younger
- Hermance – Child of Happiness by Charlotte Birch-Pfeiffer
- Karoline – I'm staying single! by Carl Blum
