= Young Germany =

Disestablishmentarian think tank consisting of young German artists from 1830-1850

Young Germany (German: Junges Deutschland) was a group of German writers who existed from about 1830 to 1850. It was essentially a youth ideology, similar to those that had swept France, Ireland, the United States and Italy. Its main proponents were Karl Gutzkow, Heinrich Laube, Theodor Mundt and Ludolf Wienbarg. Heinrich Heine, Ludwig Börne and Georg Büchner were also considered part of the movement. The wider group included Willibald Alexis, Adolf Glassbrenner, Gustav Kühne, Max Waldau and Georg Herwegh. Other figures, such as Ferdinand Freiligrath were also associated with the movement.

== Overview ==
The writers of Young Germany were against what they perceived as of "absolutism" in politics and "obscurantism" in religion. They maintained the principles of democracy, socialism, and rationalism. Among the many things they advocated were: separation of church and state, the emancipation of the Jews, and the raising of the political and social position of women. During a time of political unrest in Europe, Young Germany was regarded as dangerous by many politicians due to its progressive viewpoint. During December 1835, the Frankfurt Bundestag banned the publication in Germany of many authors associated with the movement, namely Heine, Gutzkow, Laube, Mundt, and Wienbarg. In their reasoning, they explained that the Young Germans were attempting to “attack the Christian religion in the most impudent way, degrade existing conditions and destroy all discipline and morality with belletristic writings accessible to all classes of readers.”

The ideology produced poets, thinkers and journalists, all of whom reacted against the introspection and particularism of Romanticism in the national literature, which had resulted in a total separation of literature from the actualities of life. The Romantic Movement was considered apolitical, lacking the activism that Germany's burgeoning intelligentsia required. As a result of the decades of compulsory school attendance in German states, mass literacy meant an excess of educated males which the establishment could not subsume. Thus in the 1830s, with the advantage of inexpensive printing presses, there was a rush of educated males into the so-called “free professions.”
