= Luise Mühlbach =

German writer (1814–1873)

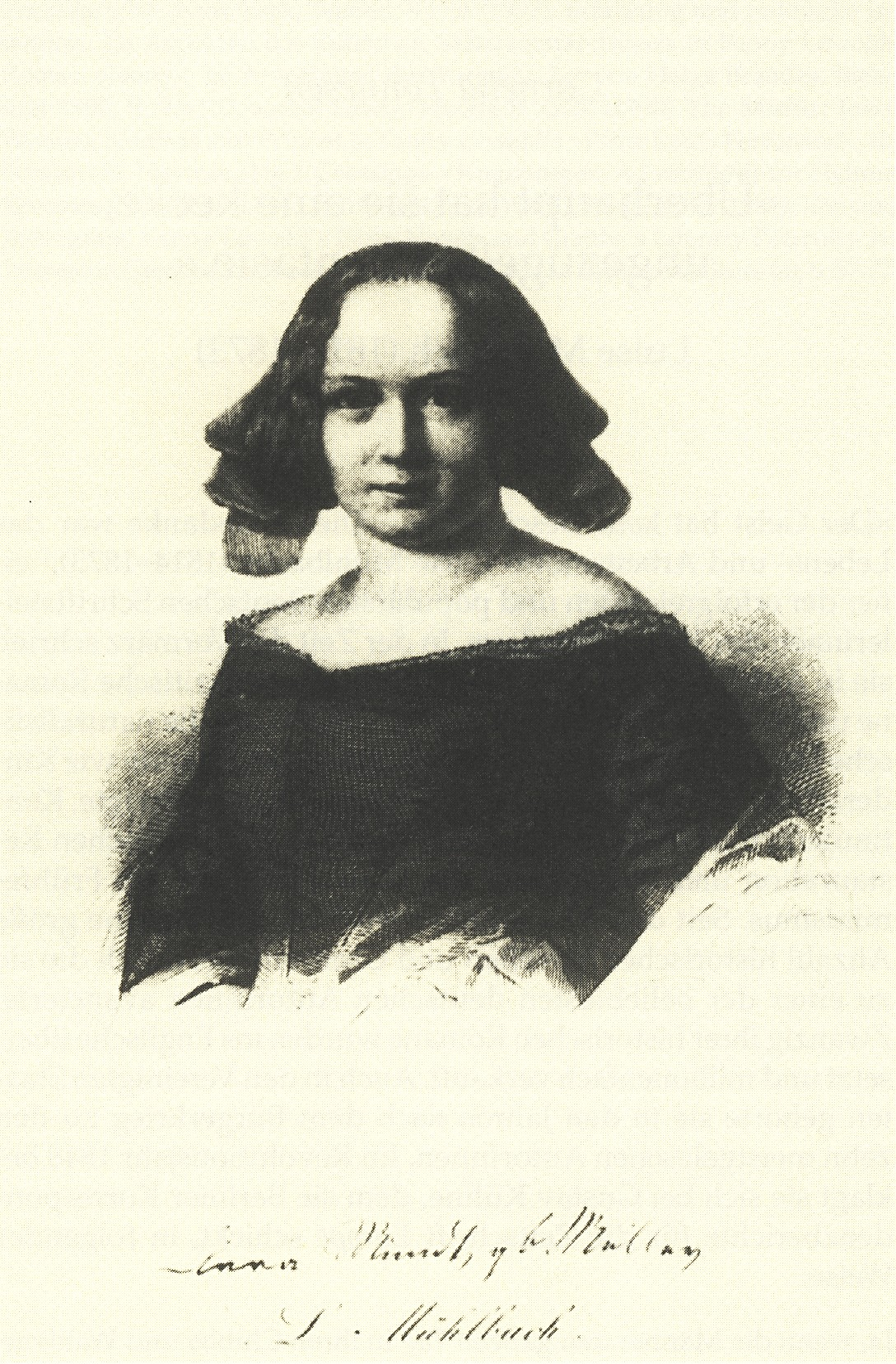
Luise Mühlbach

Luise Mühlbach was the pen name of Clara Mundt (née Clara Maria Regina Müller; January 2, 1814, Neubrandenburg – September 26, 1873, Berlin), a German writer best known for her works of historical fiction, which enjoyed a wide, though short-lived popularity. Frederick the Great and His Court (German: Friedrich der Grosse und sein Hof) and many of her other novels have been translated into English.

She was born to Friedrich Andreas Müller and Friederika Müller (née Strübing) in Neubrandenburg.

== Works ==
Her historical fiction includes:

- Andreas Hofer
- Berlin and Sans-Souci; or Frederick the Great and his friends
- A Conspiracy of the Carbonari
- The Daughter of an Empress
- Empress Josephine
- Frederick the Great and His Court
- Frederick the Great and His Family
- Goethe & Schiller, (English edition, 1902, P.F. Collier & Son)
- Henry VIII and His Court
- Joseph II and His Court
- Louisa of Prussia and Her Times
- Marie Antoinette and Her Son
- The Merchant of Berlin An Historical Novel
- Mohammed Ali and His House
- Napoleon and Blücher; or Napoleon in Germany
- Napoleon and the Queen of Prussia
- Old Fritz and the New Era
- Prince Eugene and His Times
- Queen Hortense: A Life Picture of the Napoleonic Era
- The Reign of the Great Elector
- The Youth of the Great Elector
- Franz Rákóczy

== Family ==
She was married to the critic and novelist Theodor Mundt.
