= Adolf Glassbrenner =

German humorist and satirist

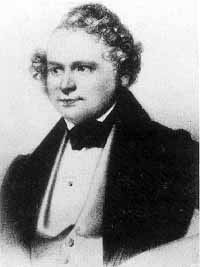
Adolf Glassbrenner

Adolf Glassbrenner (27 March 1810 in Berlin – 25 September 1876) was a German humorist and satirist, considered part of the Young Germany Movement.

== Biography ==
Glassbrenner was born in Berlin. After working for a short time in a merchant's office, he turned to journalism, and in 1831 edited Beriner Don Quixote, a periodical which was suppressed in 1833 owing to its revolutionary tendencies. He next, under the pseudonym Adolf Brennglas, published a series of pictures of Berlin life, under the titles Berlin wie es ist und trinkt (thirty parts, with illustrations, 1833–1849), and Buntes Berlin (fourteen parts, with illustrations, Berlin, 1837–1858), and thus became the founder of a popular satirical literature associated with modern Berlin. In 1840 he married the actress Adele Peroni (1813–1895), and removed in the following year to Neustrelitz, where his wife had obtained an engagement at the Grand Ducal theatre. In 1848 Glassbrenner entered the political arena and became the leader of the democratic party in Mecklenburg-Strelitz. Expelled from that country in 1850, he settled in Hamburg, where he remained until 1858; and then he became editor of the Montagszeitung Berlin, where he died in 1876. His grave is preserved in the Protestant Friedhof III der Jerusalems- und Neuen Kirchengemeinde (Cemetery No. III of the congregations of Jerusalem's Church and New Church) in Berlin-Kreuzberg, south of Hallesches Tor.

Among Glassbrenner's other humorous and satirical writings may be mentioned:

- Leben und Treiben der feinen Welt (1834)
- Bilder und Träume aus Wien (2 vols., 1836)
- Gedichte (1851, 5th ed. 1870)
- Neuer Reineke Fuchs (1846, 4th ed. 1870)
- Die verkehrte Welt (1857, 6th ed. 1873)
- Kaspar der Mensch (1850)
- Berliner Volksleben (3 vols., illustrated; Leipzig, 1847–1851)
- Lachende Kinder (14th ed., 1884)
- Sprechende Tiere (20th ed., Hamburg, 1899).
