= Heinrich Laube =

German writer (1806–1884)

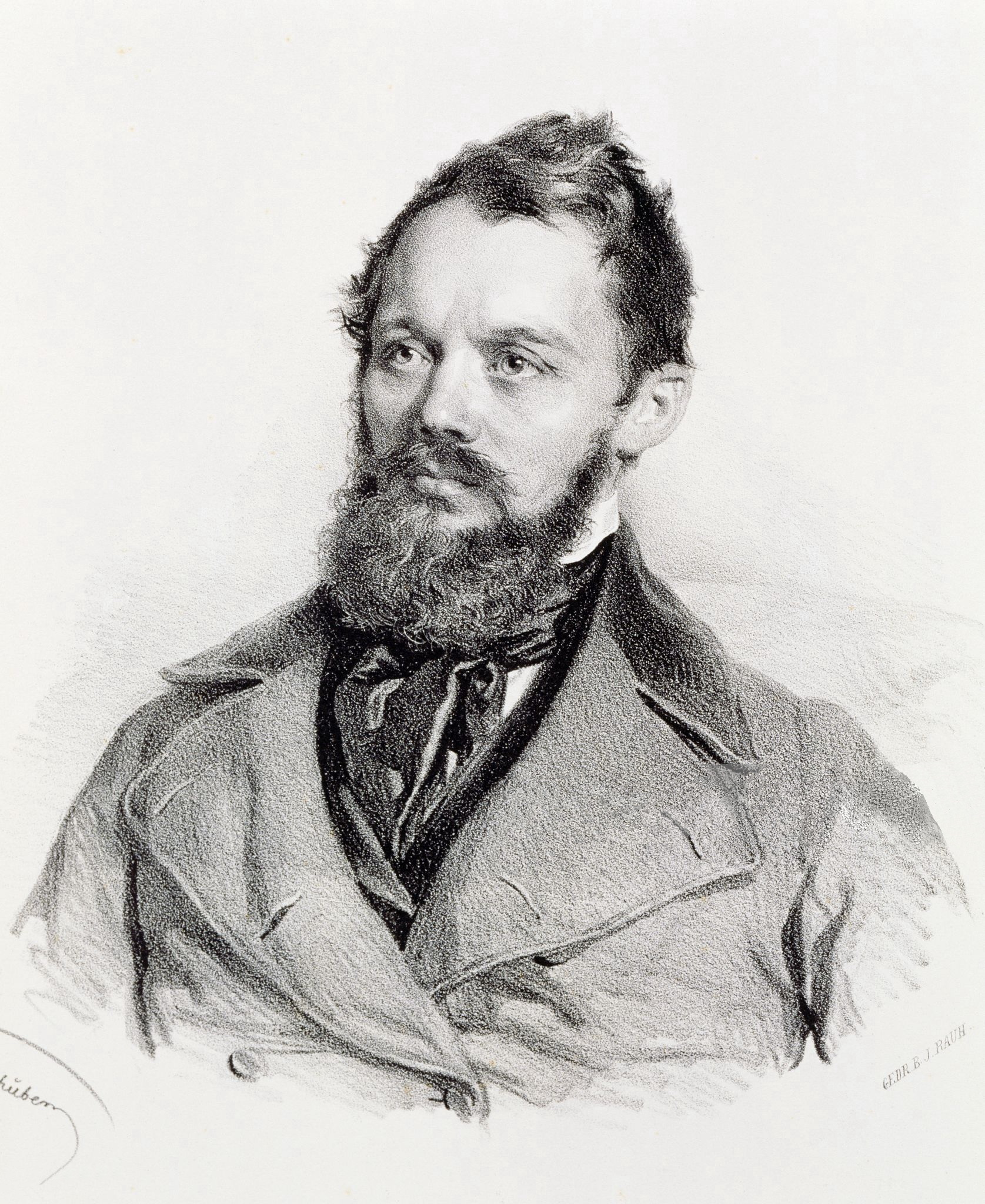
- Born: September 18, 1806; Sprottau, Prussian Silesia
- Died: August 1, 1884 (aged 77); Vienna, Austria-Hungary
- Occupations: Dramatist; novelist; theater director
- Writing career
- Genres: Drama; Political essay
- Literary movement: Young Germany

Heinrich Laube (18 September 1806 – 1 August 1884), German dramatist, novelist and theatre-director, was born at Sprottau in Prussian Silesia.

== Life ==
He studied theology at Halle and Breslau (1826–1829), and settled in Leipzig in 1832. Here he at once came into prominence with his political essays, collected under the title Das neue Jahrhundert, in two parts — Polen (1833) and Politische Briefe (1833) — and with the novel Das junge Europa, in three parts — Die Poeten, Die Krieger, Die Bürger — (1833–1837).

These writings, in which, after the fashion of Heinrich Heine and Ludwig Börne, he severely criticized the political regime in Germany, together with the part he played in the literary movement known as "Das junge Deutschland," led to his being subjected to police surveillance and his works confiscated. On his return, in 1834, from a journey to Italy, undertaken in the company of Karl Gutzkow, Laube was expelled from Saxony and imprisoned for nine months in Berlin. In 1836 he married the widow of Professor Hänel of Leipzig; almost immediately afterwards he suffered a year's imprisonment for his revolutionary sympathies. He was the stepfather of Albert Hänel.

In 1839, he again settled in Leipzig and began a literary activity as a playwright. Chief among his earlier productions are the tragedies Monaldeschi (1845) and Struensee (1847); the comedies Rokoko, oder die alten Herren (1846); Gottsched und Gellert (1847); and Die Karlsschüler (1847), of which the youthful Friedrich Schiller is the hero.

In 1848, Laube was elected to the Frankfurt Parliament for the district of Elbogen, but resigned in the spring of 1849, when he was appointed artistic director of the Hofburg theatre in Vienna. This office he held until 1867, and in this period fall his finest dramatic productions, notably the tragedies Graf Essex (1856) and Montrose (1859), and his historical romance Der deutsche Krieg (1865–1866, 9 vols), which graphically pictures a period in the Thirty Years' War.

In 1869, he became director of the Leipzig Stadttheater, but returned to Vienna in 1870, where in 1872 he was placed at the head of the new Wiener Stadttheater; with the exception of a short interval he managed this theatre with brilliant success until his retirement from public life in 1880. He has left a valuable record of his work in Vienna and Leipzig in the three volumes Das Burgtheater (1868), Das norddeutsche Theater (1872) and Das Wiener Stadttheater (1875).

He was still active after his retirement, and in the five years preceding his death in Vienna on 1 August 1884, he wrote the romances and novels Die Böhminger (1880), Louison (1881), Der Schatten-Wilhelm (1883), and published an interesting volume of reminiscences, Erinnerungen, 1841–1881 (1882).

== Assessment ==
Critics often argue that Laube’s strength lay in theatrical construction rather than originality. His tenure as a theater manager is frequently cited as his most significant contribution to the German literary history.

== Works ==
=== Other novels ===
Besides those mentioned above, other of his novels of note are:

- Das Glück (1837)
- Der Prätendent (1842)
- Die Grafin Chateaubriand (1843)

=== Other dramas ===
Other dramas of note include:

- Böse Zungen (1868)
- Demetrius (1872)

=== Collected works ===
His Gesammelte Schriften (excluding his dramas) were published in 16 vols (1875–1882); his Dramatische Werke, in 13 vols (1845–1875); a popular edition of the latter in 12 vols (1880–1892). An edition of Laube's Ausgewählte Werke in 10 vols appeared in 1906 with an introduction by H. H. Houben.
