= Heinrich Hubert Houben =

Heinrich Hubert Houben (30 March 1875 – 27 July 1935) was a German literary historian. From 1907 to 1919 Houben was literary director of the publishing firm Brockhaus.

== Works ==
- Zeitschriften der Romantik [Romantic magazines], 1904
- (ed.) Gespräche mit Goethe in den letzten Jahren seines Lebens [Conversations with Goethe in the last years of his life], 1909
- Jungdeutscher Sturm und Drang: Ergebnisse und Studien, 1911
- Verbotene Literatur von der klassischen Zeit bis zur Gegenwart; ein kritisch-historisches Lexikon über verbotene Bücher, Zeitschriften und Theaterstücke, Schriftsteller und Verleger [Banned literature from the classical period to the present], 1925
- Gespräche mit Heine [Conversations with Heine], 1926
- (ed.) Zehn Jahre bei Goethe : Erinnerungen an Weimars klassische Zeit 1822-1832 [Ten years with Goethe: memories of Weimar's classical period, 1822-1832] by Frédéric Soret. 1929.
- Der polizeiwidrige Goethe [The police against Goethe], 1932.
- Christoper Columbus: the tragedy of a discoverer, 1935. Translated by John Linton.
