= Max Kalbeck =

German music critic and biographer (1850–1921)

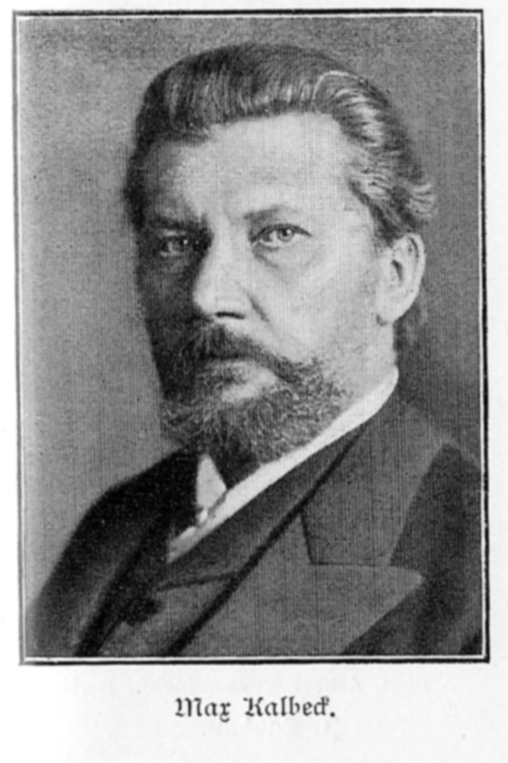
Kalbeck before 1902

Max Kalbeck (4 January 1850 – 4 May 1921) was a German music critic, writer and translator. Best known as a biographer of his friend Johannes Brahms, he became one of the most influential critics in Austria. He was bitterly opposed to the music of Richard Wagner, Anton Bruckner and Hugo Wolf.

== Early life ==
Kalbeck was born in Breslau and studied music in Munich. In 1875, he became the music-critic for the Schlesische Zeitung and assistant director of the Breslau Museum. He came to Vienna in 1880 on the invitation of Eduard Hanslick, first as critic of the Allgemeine Zeitung and then, from 1886 till his death, of the Neue Wiener Tagblatt.

== Career ==
Kalbeck was a close friend and partisan of Johannes Brahms. Kalbeck's principal achievement was his eight-volume biography of that composer, published from 1904 to 1914, which has never been translated into English. Kalbeck also edited several volumes of Brahms's correspondence and in 1918, the letters of the poets Gottfried Keller and Paul Heyse, as well as publishing two collections of his music reviews.

Kalbeck wrote new libretti for Mozart's Bastien und Bastienne and La finta giardiniera; and he revised those of Don Giovanni and The Marriage of Figaro for Gustav Mahler's productions at the Vienna Hofoper. In addition, he supplied lyrics for the songs in the operetta Jabuka by Johann Strauss II, the dialogue and plot being the work of Gustav Davis.

Kalbeck also wrote poetry and Brahms set a few of his verses to music as songs.

== Personal life ==
In 1921, Kalbeck died in Vienna. He was 71.
