= Theodor Mundt =

German author and critic (1808–1861)

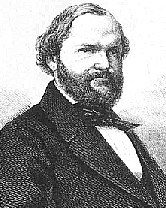
Theodor Mundt

Theodor Mundt (September 19, 1808 – November 30, 1861) was a German critic and novelist. He was a member of the Young Germany group of German writers.

== Biography ==
Born at Potsdam, Mundt studied philology and philosophy at Berlin. In 1832 he settled at Leipzig as a journalist, where he co-edited Blätter für litterarische Unterhaltung, and where he was subjected to a rigorous police supervision. In 1839 he married Klara Müller (1814–1873), who under the name of Luise Mühlbach became a popular novelist, and he moved in the same year to Berlin. Here his intention of entering upon an academical career was for a time thwarted by his collision with the Prussian press laws. In 1842, however, he was permitted to establish himself as Privatdozent. In 1848 he was appointed Professor of Literature and History in Breslau, and in 1850 ordinary professor and librarian in Berlin, where he died.

== Works ==
Mundt wrote extensively on aesthetic subjects, and as a critic he had considerable influence in his time. Prominent among his works are Die Kunst der deutschen Prosa (1837); Geschichte der Literatur der Gegenwart (1840); Aesthetik, die Idee der Schönheit und des Kunstwerks im Lichte unserer Zeit (1845, new ed. 1868); Die Götterwelt der alten Völker (1846, new ed. 1854). He also wrote several historical novels such as Thomas Münzer (1841); Mendoza (1847); and Die Matadore (1850). With Karl August Varnhagen von Ense, he edited Karl Ludwig von Knebel's letters and posthumous works. But perhaps Mundt's chief title to fame was his part in the emancipation of women, a theme which he elaborated in Madonna, Unterhaltungen mit einer Heiligen (1835).
