= German literature =

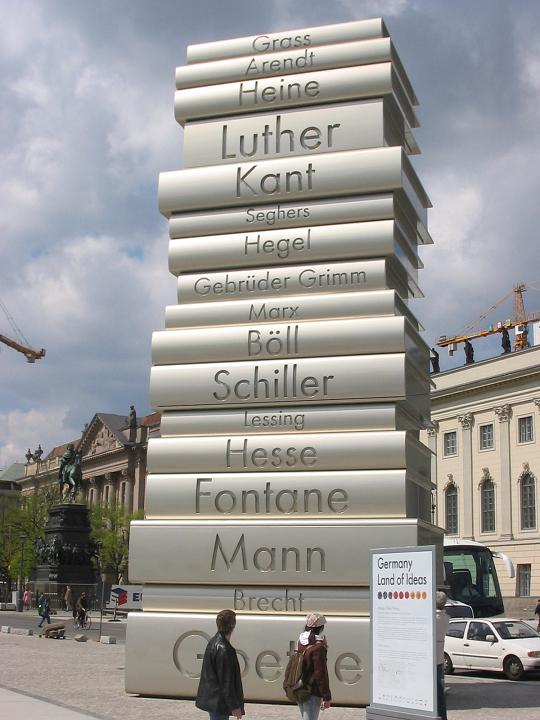
Sculpture in Berlin depicting the names of Grass, Arendt, Heine, Luther, Kant, Seghers, Hegel, Brothers Grimm, Marx, Böll, Schiller, Lessing, Hesse, Fontane, Mann, Brecht and Goethe.

German literature (German: Deutschsprachige Literatur) comprises those literary texts written in the German language. This includes literature written in Germany, Austria, the German parts of Switzerland and Belgium, Liechtenstein, Luxembourg, South Tyrol in Italy and to a lesser extent works of the German diaspora. German literature of the modern period is mostly in Standard German, but there are some currents of literature influenced to a greater or lesser degree by dialects (e.g. Alemannic).

Medieval German literature is literature written in Germany, stretching from the Carolingian dynasty; various dates have been given for the end of the German literary Middle Ages, the Reformation (1517) being the last possible cut-off point. The Old High German period is reckoned to run until about the mid-11th century; the most famous works are the Hildebrandslied and a heroic epic known as the Heliand. Middle High German starts in the 12th century; the key works include The Ring (c. 1410) and the poems of Oswald von Wolkenstein and Johannes von Tepl. The Baroque period (1600 to 1720) was one of the most fertile times in German literature. Modern literature in German begins with the authors of the Enlightenment (such as Herder). The Sensibility movement of the 1750s–1770s ended with Goethe's best-selling The Sorrows of Young Werther (1774). The Sturm und Drang and Weimar Classicism movements were led by Johann Wolfgang von Goethe and Friedrich Schiller. German Romanticism was the dominant movement of the late 18th and early 19th centuries.

Biedermeier refers to the literature, music, the visual arts and interior design in the period between the years 1815 (Vienna Congress), the end of the Napoleonic Wars, and 1848, the year of the European revolutions. Under the Nazi regime, some authors went into exile (Exilliteratur) and others submitted to censorship ("internal emigration", Innere Emigration). The Nobel Prize in Literature has been awarded to German language authors fourteen times (as of 2023), or the third most often, behind only French language authors (with 16 laureates) and English language authors (with 32 laureates) with winners including Thomas Mann, Hermann Hesse, Günter Grass, and Peter Handke.

== Periodization ==
Periodization is not an exact science but the following list contains movements or time periods typically used in discussing German literature. It seems worth noting that the periods of medieval German literature span two or three centuries, those of early modern German literature span one century, and those of modern German literature each span one or two decades. The closer one nears the present, the more debated the periodizations become.

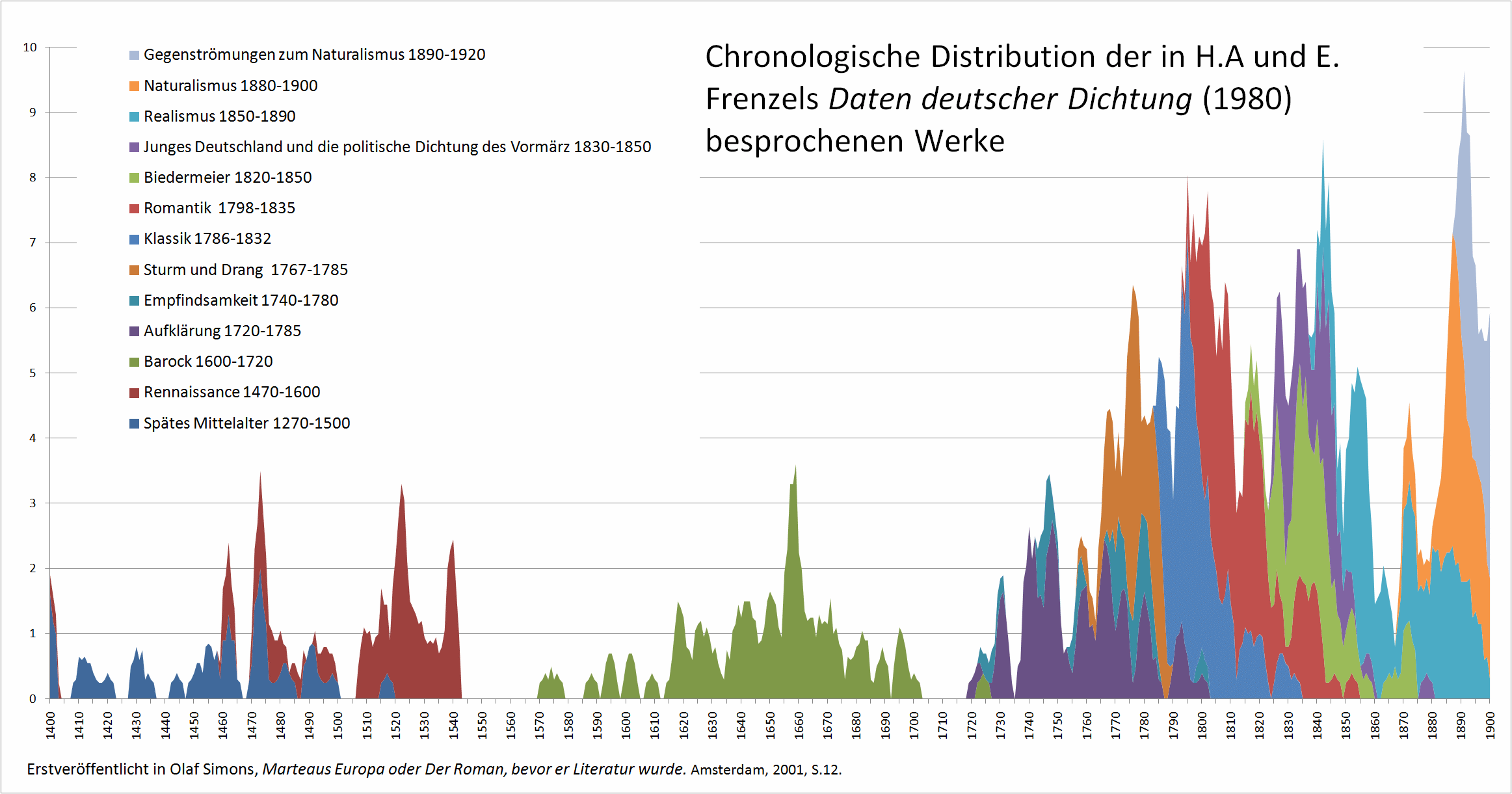
Graph of works listed in Frenzel, Daten deutscher Dichtung (1953). Visible is medieval literature overlapping with Renaissance up to the 1540s, modern literature beginning 1720, and baroque-era works (1570 to 1730) in between; there is a 20-year gap, 1545–1565, separating the Renaissance from the Baroque era. The Diagram was first published in Olaf Simons, Marteaus Europa, oder Der Roman, bevor er Literatur wurde (Amsterdam/ Atlanta: Rodopi, 2001), p. 12. It does not give a picture of the actual production of German literature, but the selection and classification of literary works by Herbert Alfred and Elizabeth Frenzel.

- Medieval German literature
  - Old High German literature (750–1050)
  - Middle High German literature (1050–1350)
  - Late medieval / Renaissance (1350–1500)
- Early Modern German literature (see Early Modern literature)
  - Humanism and Protestant Reformation (1500–1650)
  - Baroque (1600–1720)
  - Enlightenment (1680–1789)
- Modern German literature
  - 18th- and 19th-century German literature
    - Empfindsamkeit / Sensibility (1750s–1770s)
    - Sturm und Drang / Storm and Stress (1760s–1780s)
    - German Classicism (1729–1832)
      - Weimar Classicism (1788–1805) or (1788–1832), depending on Schiller's (1805) or Goethe's (1832) death
    - German Romanticism (1790s–1880s)
    - Biedermeier (1815–1848)
    - Young Germany (1830–1850)
    - Poetic Realism (1848–1890)
    - Naturalism (1880–1900)
  - 20th-century German literature
    - 1900–1933
      - Fin de siècle (c. 1900)
      - Symbolism
      - Expressionism (1910–1920)
      - Dada (1914–1924)
      - New Objectivity (Neue Sachlichkeit)
    - Well Known Writers of the 20th Century
    - 1933–1945
      - National Socialist literature
      - Exile literature
    - 1945–1989
      - By country
        - Federal Republic of Germany
        - German Democratic Republic
        - Austria
        - Switzerland
        - Other
      - By thematic or group
        - Post-war literature (1945–1967)
        - Trümmerliteratur
        - Group 47
        - Holocaust literature
        - Pop literature
  - Contemporary German literature (1989–)

== Middle Ages ==
Medieval German literature refers to literature written in Germany, stretching from the Carolingian dynasty; various dates have been given for the end of the German literary Middle Ages, the Reformation (1517) being the last possible cut-off point.

=== Old High German ===
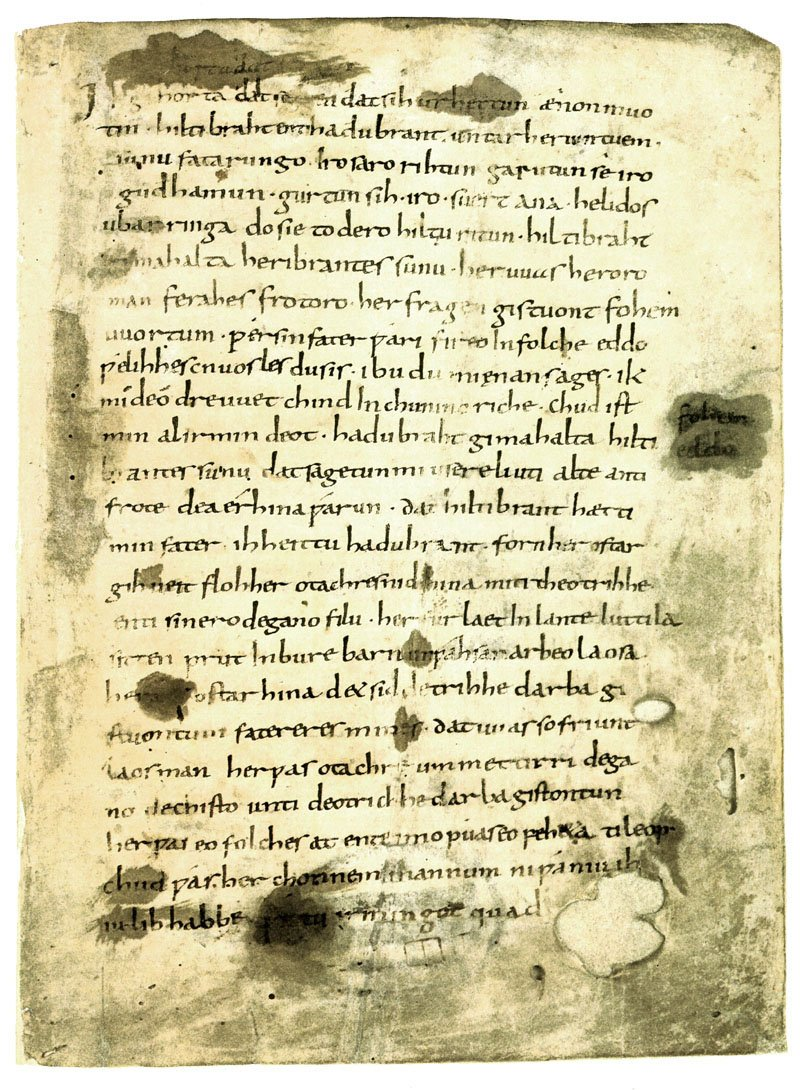
The first page of the Hildebrandslied manuscript

The Old High German period is reckoned to run until about the mid-11th century, though the boundary to Early Middle High German (second half of the 11th century) is not clear-cut.

The earliest texts date from the second half of the 8th century: translation aids (glosses and glossaries) for those learning to read Latin and translations of Latin Christian texts (prayers, creeds, confessions) for use in missionary or pastoral work among the lay population. Translations and, later, adaptations of Latin Christian texts, continue throughout the period, and are seen in Otfrid's gospel harmony in the 9th century and the extensive works of Notker III in the early 11th century.

The most famous work in OHG is the Hildebrandslied, a short piece of Germanic alliterative heroic verse which besides the Muspilli is the sole survivor of what must have been a vast oral tradition. Another important work, in the northern dialect of Old Saxon, is a life of Christ in the style of a heroic epic known as the Heliand.

=== Middle High German ===
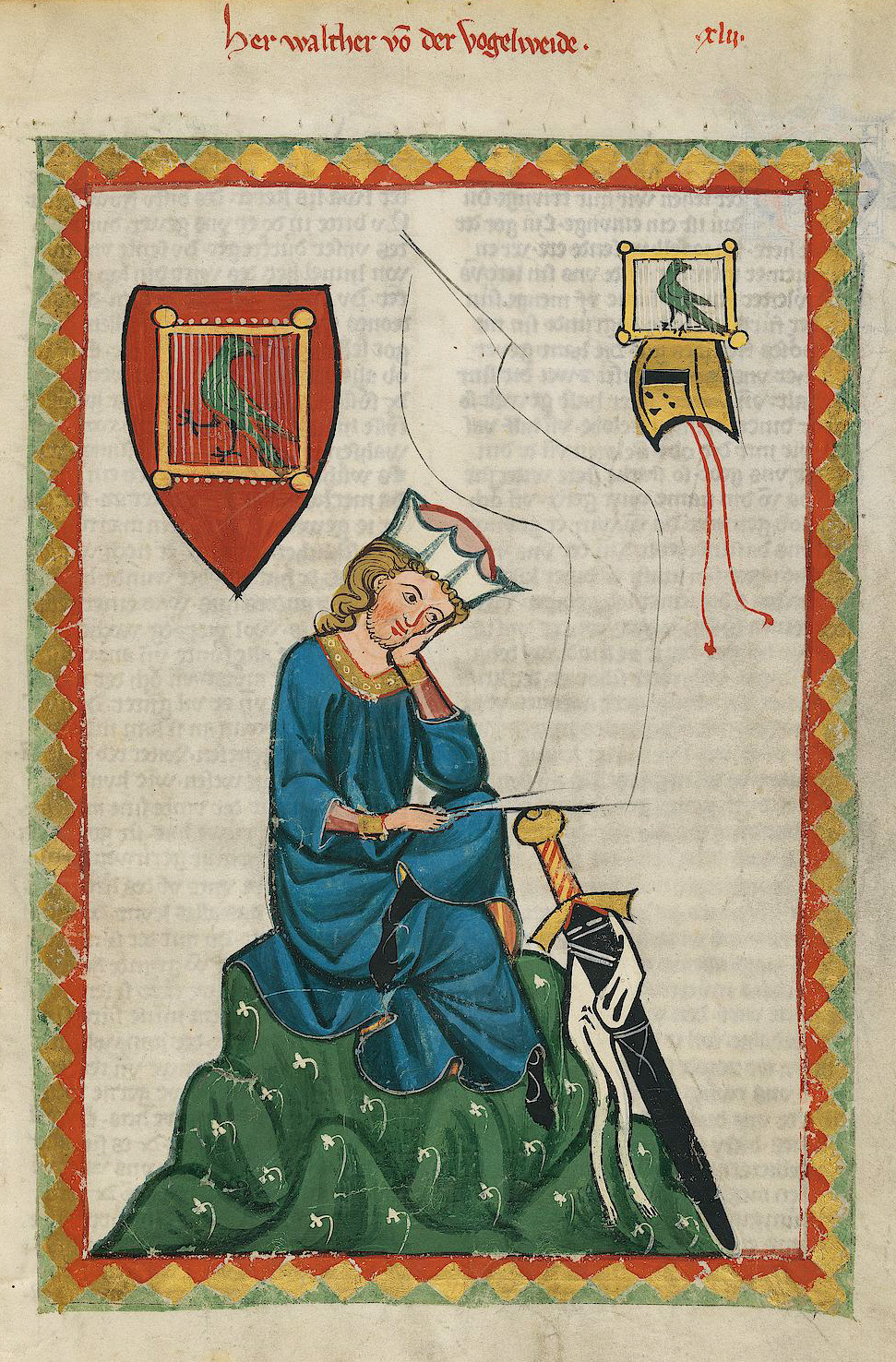
Portrait of Walther von der Vogelweide from the Codex Manesse (Folio 124r)

Middle High German proper runs from the beginning of the 12th century, and in the second half of the 12th century, there was a sudden intensification of activity, leading to a 60-year "golden age" of medieval German literature referred to as the mittelhochdeutsche Blütezeit (1170–1230). This was the period of the blossoming of MHG lyric poetry, particularly Minnesang (the German variety of the originally French tradition of courtly love). One of the most important of these poets was Walther von der Vogelweide. The same sixty years saw the composition of the most important courtly romances. These are written in rhyming couplets, and again draw on French models such as Chrétien de Troyes, many of them relating Arthurian material, for example, Parzival by Wolfram von Eschenbach. The third literary movement of these years was a new revamping of the heroic tradition, in which the ancient Germanic oral tradition can still be discerned, but tamed and Christianized and adapted for the court. These high medieval heroic epics are written in rhymed strophes, not the alliterative verse of Germanic prehistory (for example, the Nibelungenlied).

The Middle High German period is conventionally taken to end in 1350, while the Early New High German is taken to begin with the German Renaissance, after the invention of movable type in the mid-15th century. Therefore, the literature of the late 14th and the early 15th century falls, as it were, in the cracks between Middle and New High German, and can be classified as either. Works of this transitional period include The Ring (c. 1410), the poems of Oswald von Wolkenstein and Johannes von Tepl, the German versions of Pontus and Sidonia, and arguably the works of Hans Folz and Sebastian Brant (Ship of Fools, 1494), among others. The Volksbuch (chapbook) tradition which would flourish in the 16th century also finds its origin in the second half of the 15th century.

== Early Modern period ==
=== German Renaissance and Reformation ===
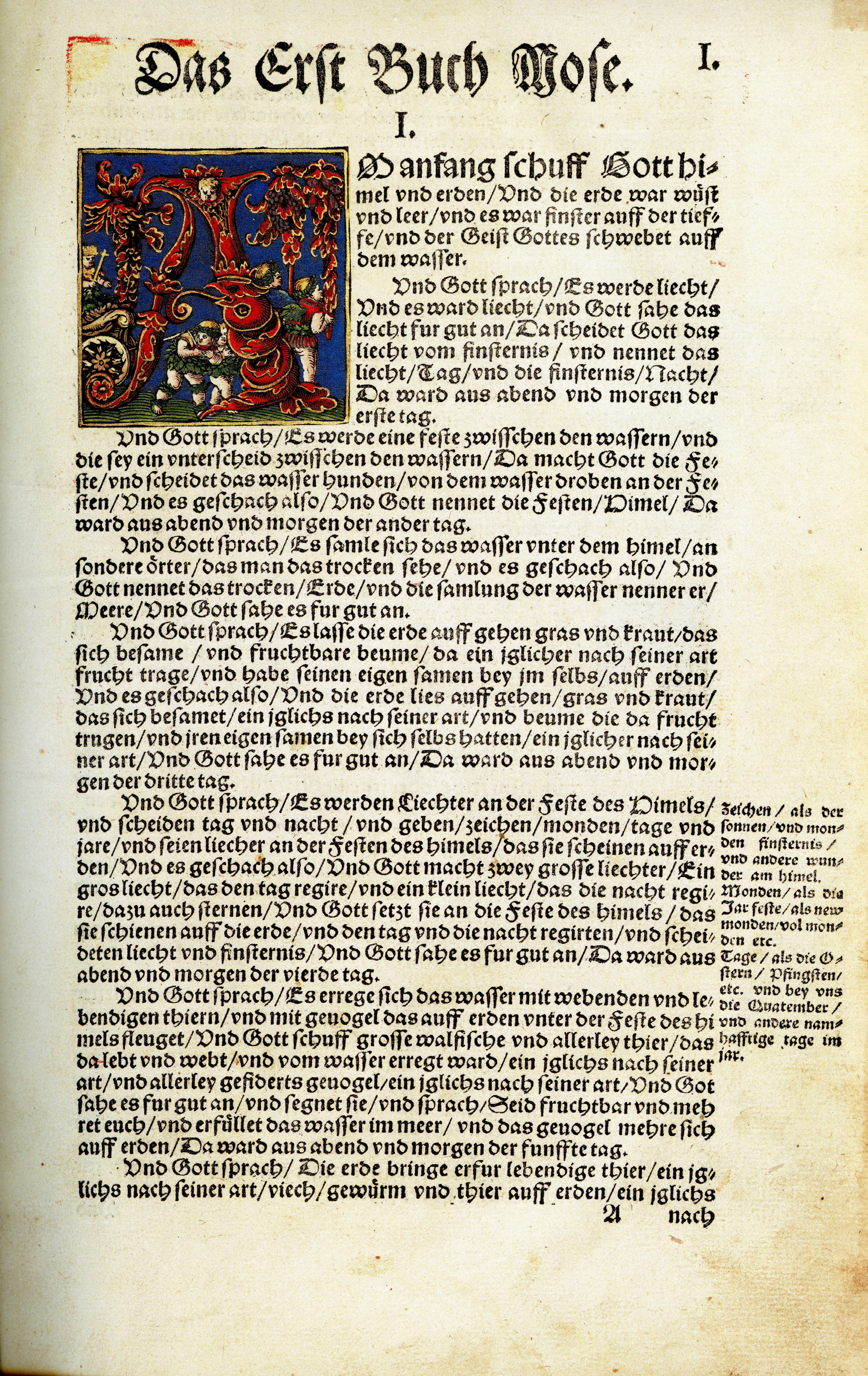
The opening page of the Book of Genesis in Martin Luther's Bible translation of 1534, published by Hans Luft

- Sebastian Brant (1457–1521)
- Thomas Murner (1475–1537)
- Martin Luther (1483–1546)
- Philipp Melanchthon (1497–1560)
- Sebastian Franck (1500–1543)
- Johann Fischart (1545–1591)

=== Baroque period ===
The Baroque period (1600 to 1720) was one of the most fertile times in German literature. Many writers reflected the horrible experiences of the Thirty Years' War, in poetry and prose. Grimmelshausen's adventures of the young and naïve Simplicissimus, in the eponymous book Simplicius Simplicissimus, became the most famous novel of the Baroque period. Martin Opitz established rules for the "purity" of language, style, verse and rhyme. Andreas Gryphius and Daniel Caspar von Lohenstein wrote German language tragedies, or Trauerspiele, often on Classical themes and frequently quite violent. Erotic, religious and occasional poetry appeared in both German and Latin. Sibylle Ursula von Braunschweig-Lüneburg wrote part of a novel, Die Durchlauchtige Syrerin Aramena (Aramena, the noble Syrian lady), which when complete would be the most famous courtly novel in German Baroque literature; it was finished by her brother Anton Ulrich and edited by Sigmund von Birken.

== 18th century ==
=== The Enlightenment ===
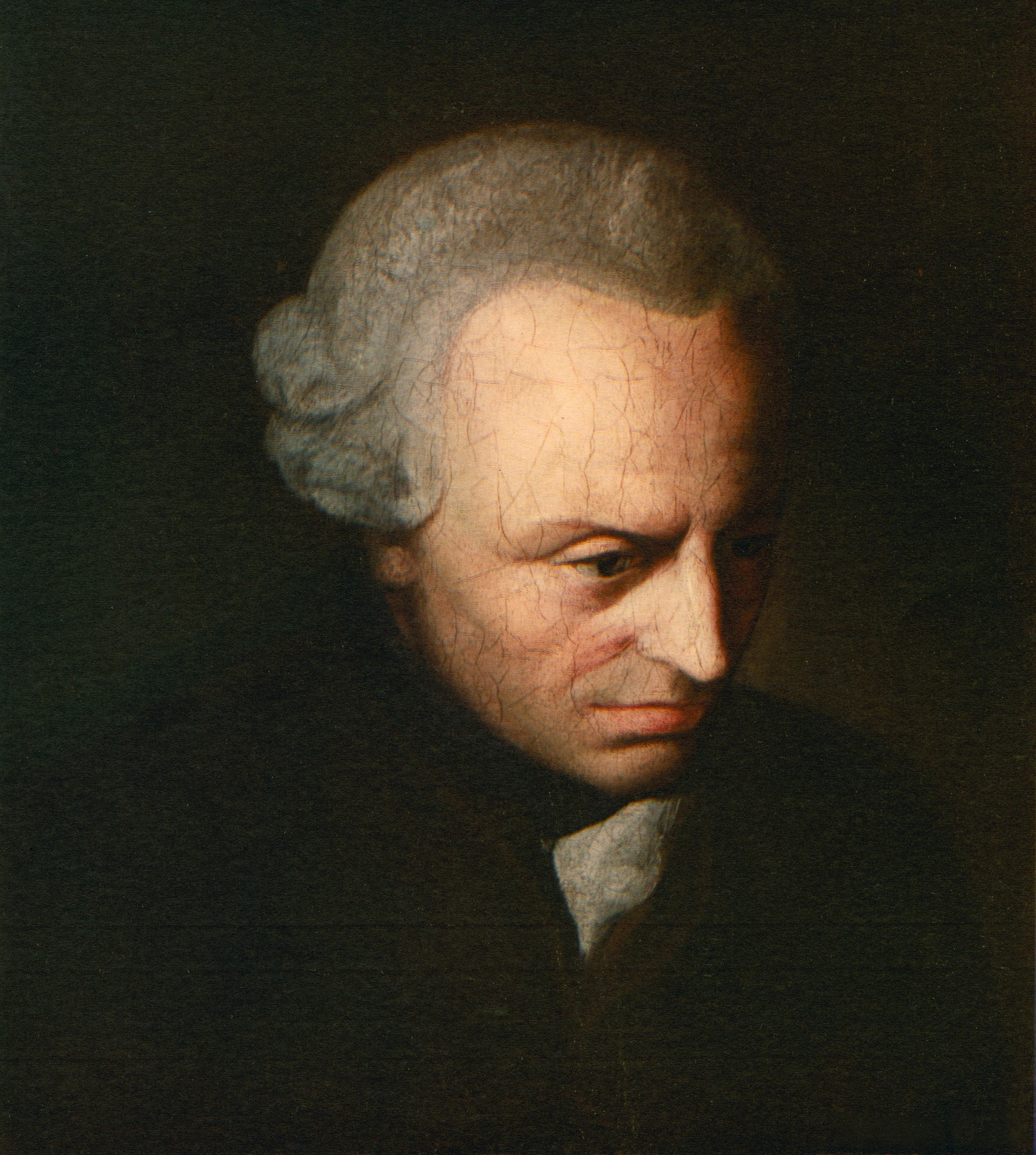
German philosopher Immanuel Kant, one of the most influential figures of Enlightenment and modern philosophy

- August Friedrich Wilhelm Crome
- Johann Gottfried Herder
- Paul Heinrich Dietrich von Holbach
- Friedrich Heinrich Jacobi
- Theodor Gottlieb von Hippel
- Immanuel Kant
- Gotthold Ephraim Lessing
- Moses Mendelssohn
- Carl Leonhard Reinhold
- Christian Thomasius
- Christian Jacob Wagenseil
- Christian Felix Weiße
- Christoph Martin Wieland
- Christian Wolff
- Friedrich Nicolai
- Christian Garve

=== Sensibility ===
Empfindsamkeit / Sensibility (1750s–1770s) Friedrich Gottlieb Klopstock (1724–1803), Christian Fürchtegott Gellert (1715–1769), Sophie de La Roche (1730–1807). The period culminates and ends in Goethe's best-selling Die Leiden des jungen Werthers (1774).

=== Sturm und Drang ===
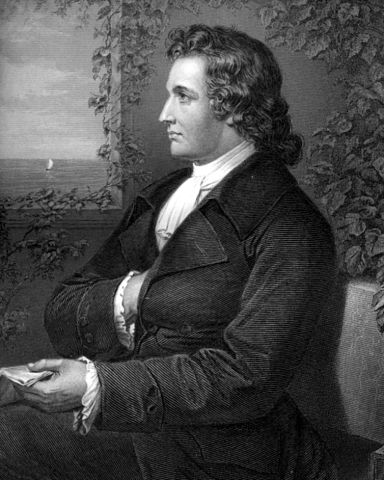
Johann Wolfgang von Goethe c. 1775

Sturm und Drang (the conventional translation is "Storm and Stress"; a more literal translation, however, might be storm and urge, storm and longing, or storm and impulse) is the name of a movement in German literature and music taking place from the late 1760s through the early 1780s in which individual subjectivity and, in particular, extremes of emotion were given free expression in response to the confines of rationalism imposed by the Enlightenment and associated aesthetic movements. The philosopher Johann Georg Hamann is considered to be the ideologue of Sturm und Drang, and Johann Wolfgang von Goethe was a notable proponent of the movement, though he and Friedrich Schiller ended their period of association with it, initiating what would become Weimar Classicism.

The first ideas of Romanticism arose from this movement, directly criticizing the Enlightenment's position that humans can fully comprehend the world through rationality alone, suggesting that intuition and emotion are key components of insight and understanding. Published in 1774, The Sorrows of Young Werther by Goethe began to shape the Romantic movement and its ideals.

== 19th century ==
=== German Classicism ===
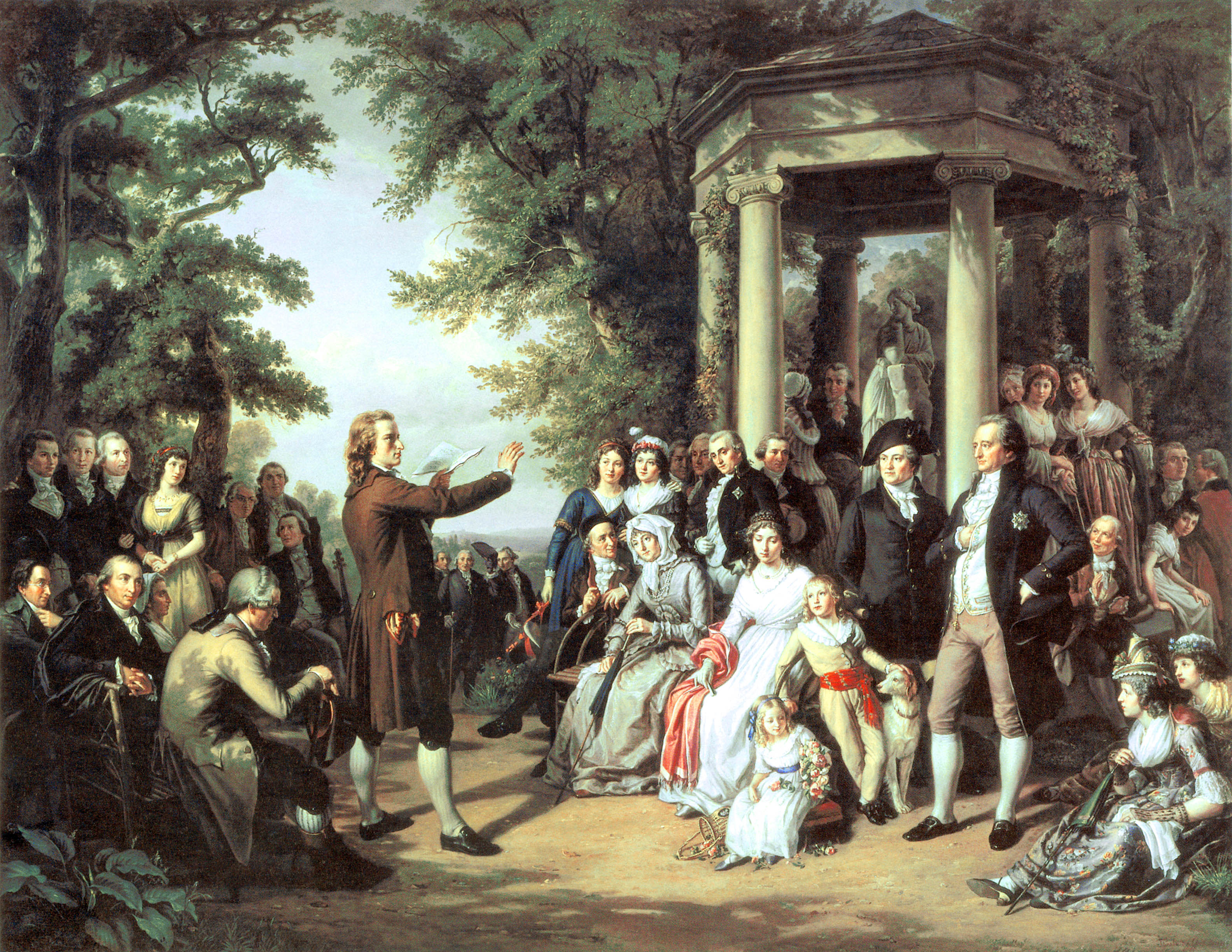
Weimar courtyard of the muses. Schiller reading to the court in Tiefurt. (1860) by Theobald von Oer.

Weimar Classicism (German “Weimarer Klassik” and “Weimarer Klassizismus”) is a cultural and literary movement of Europe, and its central ideas were originally propounded by Johann Wolfgang von Goethe and Johann Christoph Friedrich von Schiller during the period 1786 to 1805.

The Weimarer Klassik movement began in 1771 when Duchess Anna Amalia of Brunswick-Wolfenbüttel invited the Seyler Theatre Company led by Abel Seyler, pioneers of the Sturm und Drang movement, to her court in Weimar. The Seyler company was soon thereafter followed by Christoph Martin Wieland, then Goethe, Johann Gottfried Herder and finally Schiller. The movement was eventually centred upon Goethe and Schiller, previously also exponents of the Sturm und Drang movement, during the period of 1786–1805.

=== Romanticism ===
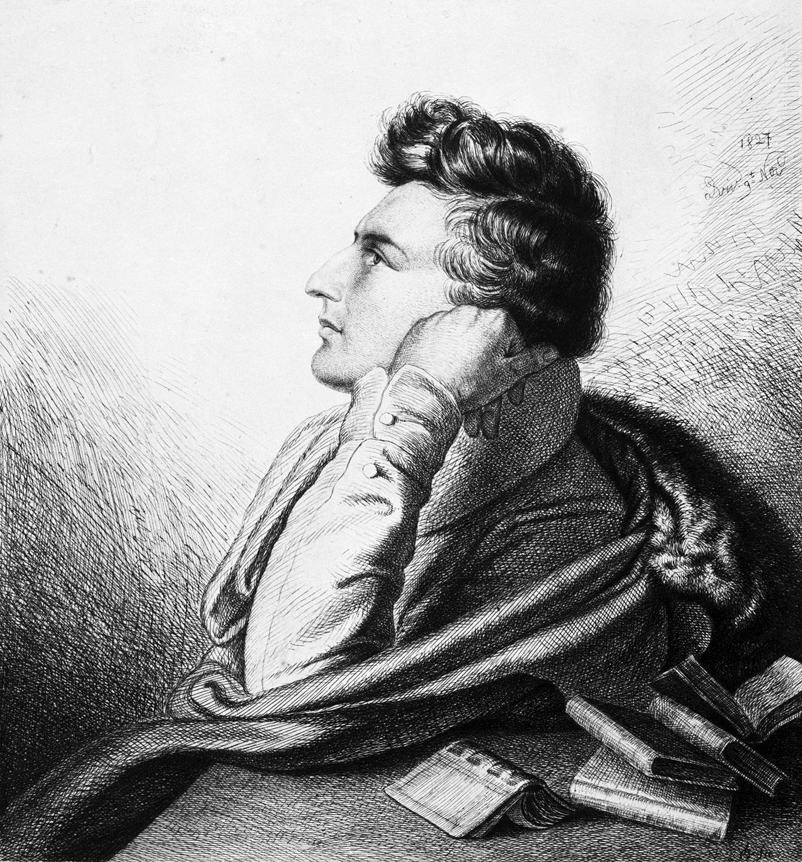
Heinrich Heine, 1827

German Romanticism was the dominant movement of the late 18th and early 19th centuries. German Romanticism developed relatively late compared to its English counterpart, coinciding in its early years with the movement known as German Classicism or Weimar Classicism, which it opposed. In contrast to the seriousness of English Romanticism, the German variety is notable for valuing humor and wit as well as beauty. The early German romantics tried to create a new synthesis of art, philosophy, and science, looking to the Middle Ages as a simpler, more integrated period. As time went on, however, they became increasingly aware of the tenuousness of the unity they were seeking. Later German Romanticism emphasized the tension between the everyday world and the seemingly irrational and supernatural projections of creative genius. Heinrich Heine in particular criticized the tendency of the early romantics to look to the medieval past for a model of unity in art and society.

- G.W.F. Hegel
- Jean Paul
- E.T.A. Hoffmann
- Friedrich Hölderlin
- Heinrich von Kleist
- Novalis (Friedrich von Hardenberg)
- Friedrich Schlegel
- August Wilhelm Schlegel
- Friedrich Schleiermacher
- Ludwig Tieck
- Friedrich de la Motte Fouqué
- Ludwig Uhland
- Arthur Schopenhauer
- Joseph von Eichendorff

=== Biedermeier and Vormärz ===
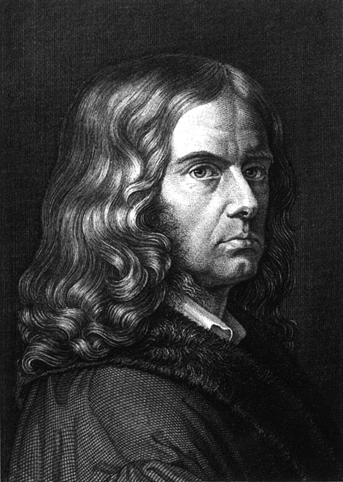
Adelbert von Chamisso

Biedermeier refers to work in the fields of literature, music, the visual arts and interior design in the period between the years 1815 (Vienna Congress), the end of the Napoleonic Wars, and 1848, the year of the European revolutions and contrasts with the Romantic era which preceded it. Typical Biedermeier poets are Annette von Droste-Hülshoff, Adelbert von Chamisso, Eduard Mörike, and Wilhelm Müller, the last three named having well-known musical settings by Robert Schumann, Hugo Wolf and Franz Schubert respectively.

Young Germany (Junges Deutschland) was a loose group of Vormärz writers which existed from about 1830 to 1850. It was essentially a youth movement (similar to those that had swept France and Ireland and originated in Italy). Its main proponents were Karl Gutzkow, Heinrich Laube, Theodor Mundt and Ludolf Wienbarg; Heinrich Heine, Ludwig Börne and Georg Büchner were also considered part of the movement. The wider circle included Willibald Alexis, Adolf Glassbrenner and Gustav Kühne.

=== Realism and Naturalism ===
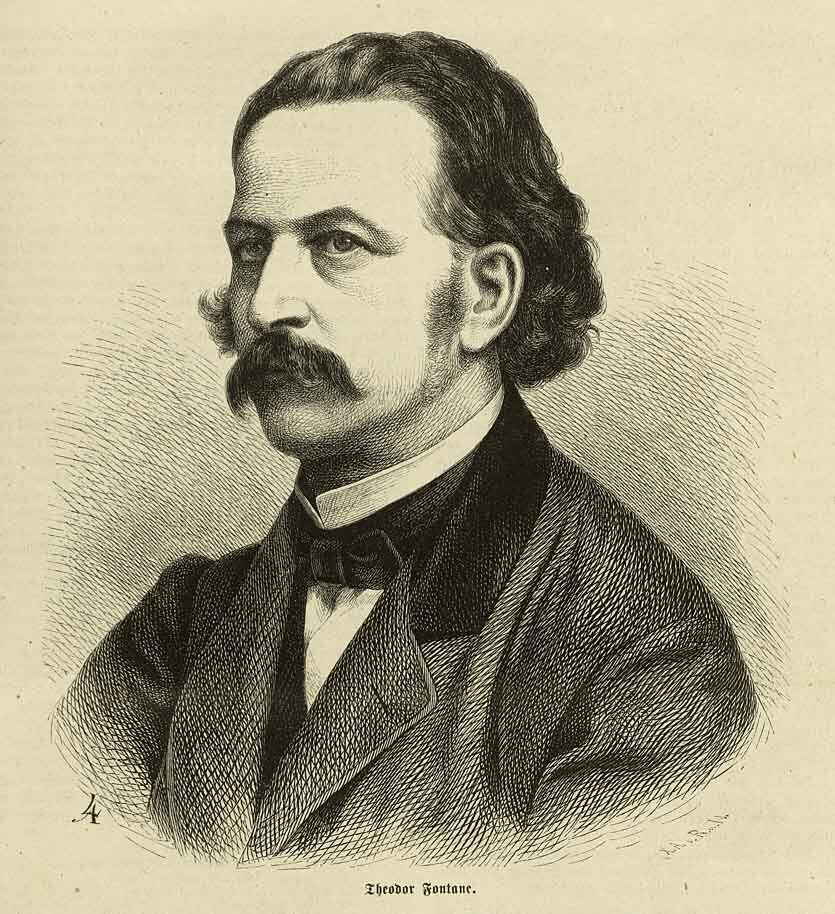
Theodor Fontane (c. 1860).

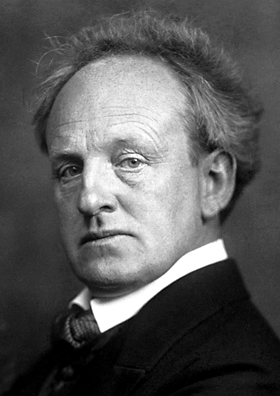
Gerhart Hauptmann is counted among the most important promoters of literary naturalism and received the Nobel Prize in Literature in 1912.

Poetic Realism (1848–1890): 19th-century German Realism in literature, emerging after 1848, focused on depicting everyday life with accuracy and restraint. Writers moved away from Romantic idealism, emphasizing the middle class, social norms, and personal morality. Rather than political upheaval, they portrayed quiet, internal conflicts and the subtle ironies of bourgeois life. This literary realism aimed for poetic realism, blending realistic detail with refined artistic form. Key authors include Theodor Fontane, Gustav Freitag, Gottfried Keller, Wilhelm Raabe, Adalbert Stifter, Theodor Storm. Their works reflect a belief in gradual societal progress, often with a sense of quiet resignation and irony, avoiding extremes of sentimentality or revolutionary zeal.

Naturalism (1880–1900): German Naturalism in literature, emerging in the late 19th century, aimed to depict life with scientific objectivity and detailed realism. Influenced by French Naturalists like Émile Zola, it focused on the deterministic effects of environment, heredity, and social conditions on individuals, especially the marginalized. Naturalist writers rejected idealization, portraying poverty, disease, and moral decay with stark precision. Dialogue often mimicked actual speech patterns, including dialects. Prominent figures include Gerhart Hauptmann, whose play Before Sunrise exemplifies the movement. German Naturalism sought to expose societal injustices, emphasizing a mechanistic, cause-and-effect view of human behavior shaped by forces beyond individual control. Key authors include naturalistic writers were Gerhart Hauptmann, Arno Holz and Johannes Schlaf.

== 20th century ==
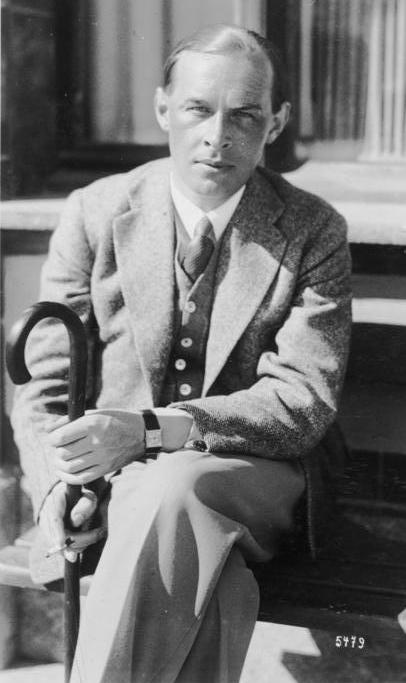
Erich Maria Remarque

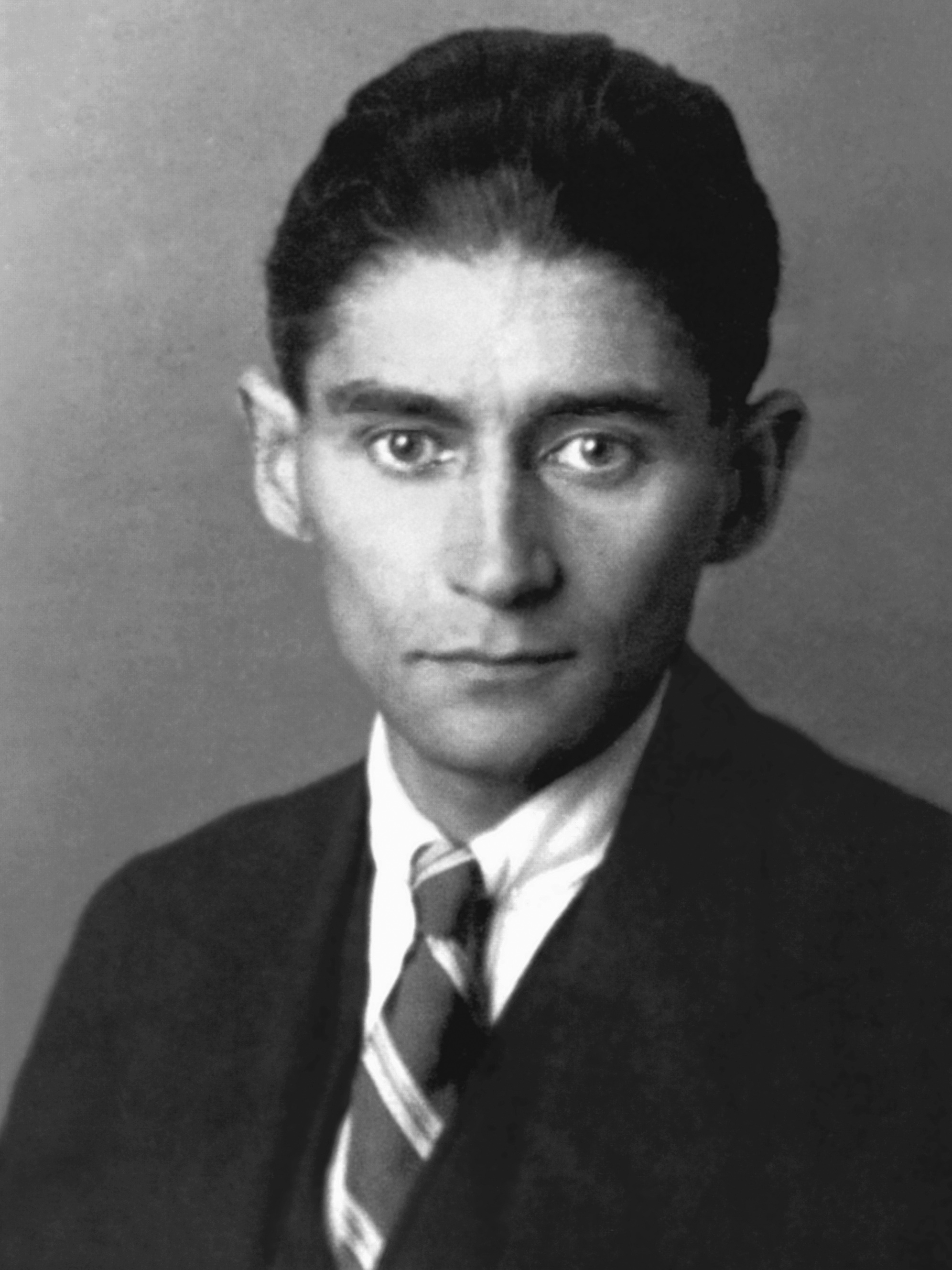
Franz Kafka

=== 1900 to 1933 ===
- Fin de siècle (c. 1900)
- Weimar literature (1919–1933)
- Symbolism
- Expressionism (1910–1920)
- Dada (1914–1924)
- New Objectivity (Neue Sachlichkeit)

=== Well known writers of the 20th century ===
A well-known writer of German literature was Franz Kafka. A Kafka novel, The Trial, was ranked #3 on Le Monde's 100 Books of the Century. Kafka's iconic writing style that captures themes of bureaucracy and existentialism resulted in the coining of the term “Kafkaesque.” Kafka's writing allowed a peek into his melancholic life, one where he felt isolated from all human beings, one of his inspirations for writing.

Kafka is therefore widely regarded as a major figure of 20th-century literature with his work been interpreted as exploring themes of alienation, existential anxiety, guilt, and absurdity. His best-known works include the novella The Metamorphosis (1915) and the novels The Trial (1924) and The Castle (1926).

=== Nazi Germany ===
- National Socialist literature: see Gelöbnis treuester Gefolgschaft, Blut und Boden, Nazi propaganda

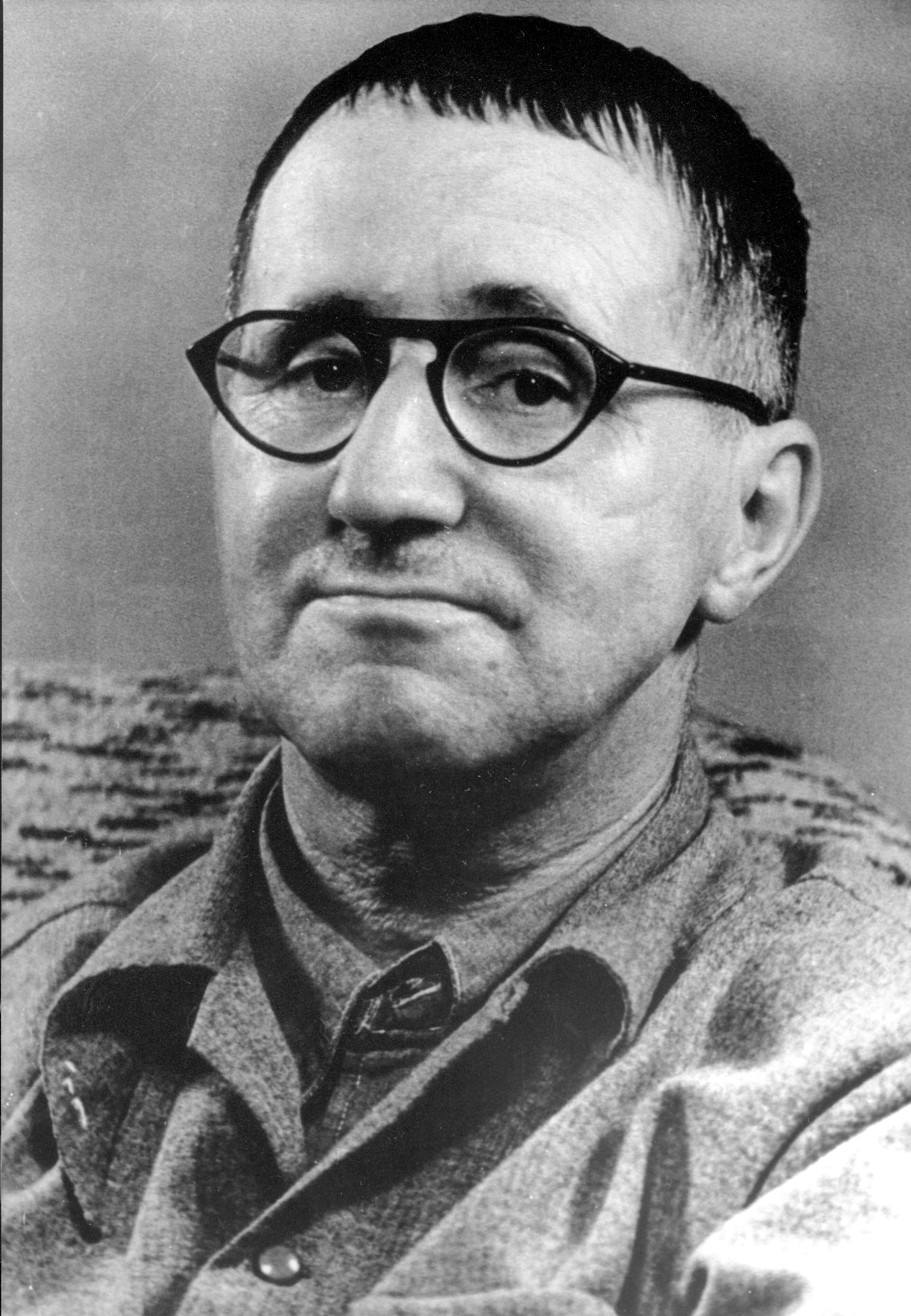
Bertolt Brecht

Under the Nazi regime, some authors went into exile (Exilliteratur) and others submitted to censorship ("inner emigration", Innere Emigration)

- Inner Emigration: Gottfried Benn, Werner Bergengruen, Hans Blüher, Hans Heinrich Ehrler, Hans Fallada, Werner Finck, Gertrud Fussenegger, Ricarda Huch, Ernst Jünger, Erich Kästner, Volker Lachmann, Oskar Loerke, Erika Mitterer, Walter von Molo, Friedrich Reck-Malleczewen, Richard Riemerschmid, Reinhold Schneider, Frank Thiess, Carl von Ossietzky, Ernst Wiechert
- in exile: Ernst Bloch, Bertolt Brecht, Hermann Broch, Alfred Döblin, Lion Feuchtwanger, Bruno Frank, A. M. Frey, Anna Gmeyner, Oskar Maria Graf, Hermann Hesse, Heinrich Eduard Jacob, Hermann Kesten, Annette Kolb, Siegfried Kracauer, Emil Ludwig, Heinrich Mann, Klaus Mann, Thomas Mann, Balder Olden, Rudolf Olden, Robert Neumann, Erich Maria Remarque, Ludwig Renn, Alice Rühle-Gerstel, Otto Rühle, Alice Schwarz-Gardos, Anna Seghers, B. Traven, Bodo Uhse, Franz Werfel, Arnold Zweig, Stefan Zweig, Joseph Roth.

=== 1945 to 1989 ===
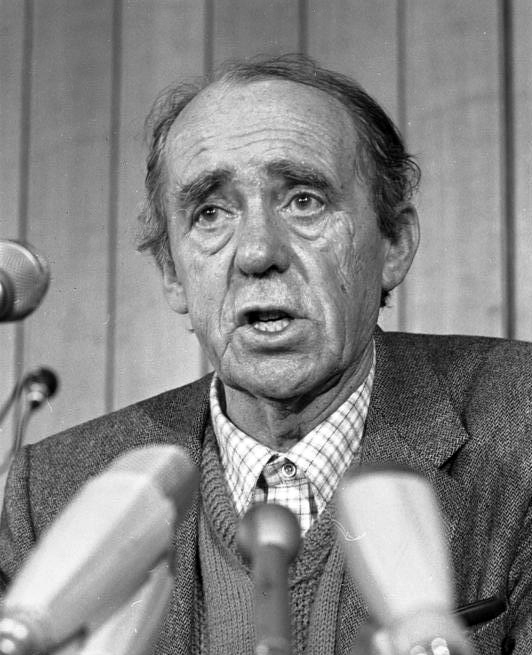
Heinrich Böll

- Post-war literature of West Germany (1945–1967): Heinrich Böll, Günter Grass, Group 47, Trümmerliteratur; Holocaust literature (Paul Celan, Edgar Hilsenrath); pop literature
- GDR Literature in East Germany: Johannes R. Becher, Jurek Becker, Wolf Biermann, Bertolt Brecht, Uwe Johnson, Sarah Kirsch, Günter Kunert, Reiner Kunze, Heiner Müller, Ulrich Plenzdorf, Anna Seghers, Christa Wolf
- Postwar literature of Switzerland and Austria: Ingeborg Bachmann, Thomas Bernhard, Friedrich Dürrenmatt, Max Frisch, Elfriede Jelinek, Peter Handke
- Postmodern literature: Christian Kracht, Hans Wollschläger, Christoph Ransmayr, Marlene Streeruwitz, Rainald Goetz, Clemens J. Setz, Oswald Wiener
- W.G. Sebald
- Arno Schmidt

== 21st century ==
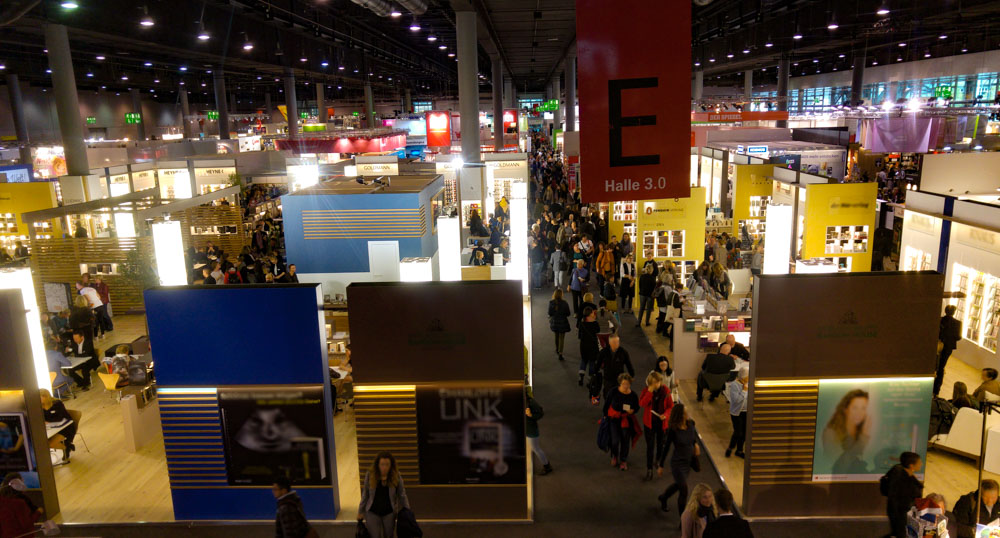
Frankfurt Book Fair 2016

Much of contemporary poetry in the German language is published in literary magazines. DAS GEDICHT, for instance, has featured German poetry from Germany, Austria, Switzerland, and Luxemburg for the last twenty years.

- Science-Fiction, Fantasy: Andreas Eschbach, Frank Schätzing, Wolfgang Hohlbein, Bernhard Hennen, Walter Moers
- Pop literature: Benjamin von Stuckrad-Barre
- Migrant literature: Wladimir Kaminer, Feridun Zaimoglu, Rafik Schami
- Poetry: Jürgen Becker, Kerstin Becker, Marcel Beyer, Theo Breuer, Rolf Dieter Brinkmann, Marc Engelhard, Hans Magnus Enzensberger, Aldona Gustas, Ernst Jandl, Thomas Kling, Uwe Kolbe, Friederike Mayröcker, Durs Grünbein, Kurt Marti, Karl Krolow, Elke Erb, Ulrike Draesner, Ann Cotten, Monika Rinck, Judith Zander
- Aphorists: Hans Kruppa
- Thriller: Ingrid Noll, Zoë Beck
- Novel: Wilhelm Genazino, Günter Grass, Herta Müller, Siegfried Lenz, Charlotte Link, Rainald Goetz, Anna Kaleri, Norbert Scheuer, Dietmar Dath, Christian Kracht, Kathrin Schmidt, Burkhard Spinnen, Robert Menasse, Martin Walser, Andreas Mand, Zsuzsa Bánk, Marc Degens, Jenny Erpenbeck, Klaus Modick, Peter Handke, Elfriede Jelinek, Daniel Kehlmann, Franzobel, Clemens J. Setz, Julya Rabinowich, Olga Flor
- Literaturport (in German): audio clips of contemporary literature, many read out by the authors themselves
- German-American literature: Paul-Henri Campbell, Walter Abish

== Children's literature ==
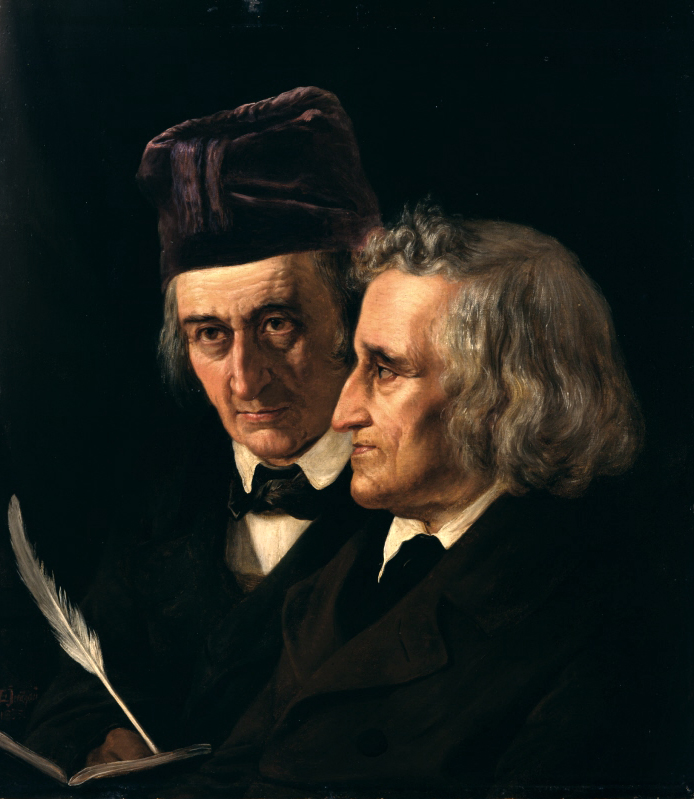
Wilhelm Grimm (left) and Jacob Grimm (right), portrayed by Elisabeth Jerichau-Baumann (1855)

The Brothers Grimm (German: die Brüder Grimm or die Gebrüder Grimm), Jacob (1785–1863) and Wilhelm (1786–1859), were German academics who together collected and published folklore. The brothers are among the best-known storytellers of folktales, popularizing stories such as "Cinderella" ("Aschenputtel"), "The Frog Prince" ("Der Froschkönig"), "Hansel and Gretel" ("Hänsel und Gretel"), "Town Musicians of Bremen" ("Die Bremer Stadtmusikanten"), "Little Red Riding Hood" ("Rotkäppchen"), "Rapunzel", "Rumpelstiltskin" ("Rumpelstilzchen"), "Sleeping Beauty" ("Dornröschen"), and "Snow White" ("Schneewittchen"). Their first collection of folktales, Children's and Household Tales (Kinder- und Hausmärchen), was first published in 1812.

A Physician Heinrich Hoffmann (1809–1894) written a book filled with cautionary tales called: Der Struwwelpeter it was published in 1845 and was given as a Christmas gift for his 3-year-old son. After that, the anniversary of Struwwelpeter and its legacy still goes on until 1864 it was reillustrated by the author himself and it was still claimed as a classic.

Another book was also inspired by Der Struwwelpeter was a book Called: (Max und Moritz) "Max and Moritz" written and illustrated by a poet and artist Wilhelm Busch (1832–1908) and it was published in 1865 it certainly became popular because of its goofy cartoon style from Busch's mind and imagination with the word of phrases and rhymes to it.

The rise of Romanticism in 19th-century Europe revived interest in traditional folk stories, which to the Brothers Grimm represented a pure form of national literature and culture. With the goal of researching a scholarly treatise on folktales, they established a methodology for collecting and recording folk stories that became the basis for folklore studies. Between 1812 and 1857 their first collection was revised and republished many times, growing from 86 stories to more than 200. In addition to writing and modifying folktales, the brothers wrote collections of well-respected Germanic and Scandinavian mythologies, and in 1838 they began writing a definitive German dictionary (Deutsches Wörterbuch), which they were unable to finish.

The popularity of the Grimms' collected folktales has endured. They are available in more than 100 translations and have been adapted by renowned filmmakers, including Lotte Reiniger and Walt Disney, in films such as Snow White and the Seven Dwarfs.

== German women's literature ==
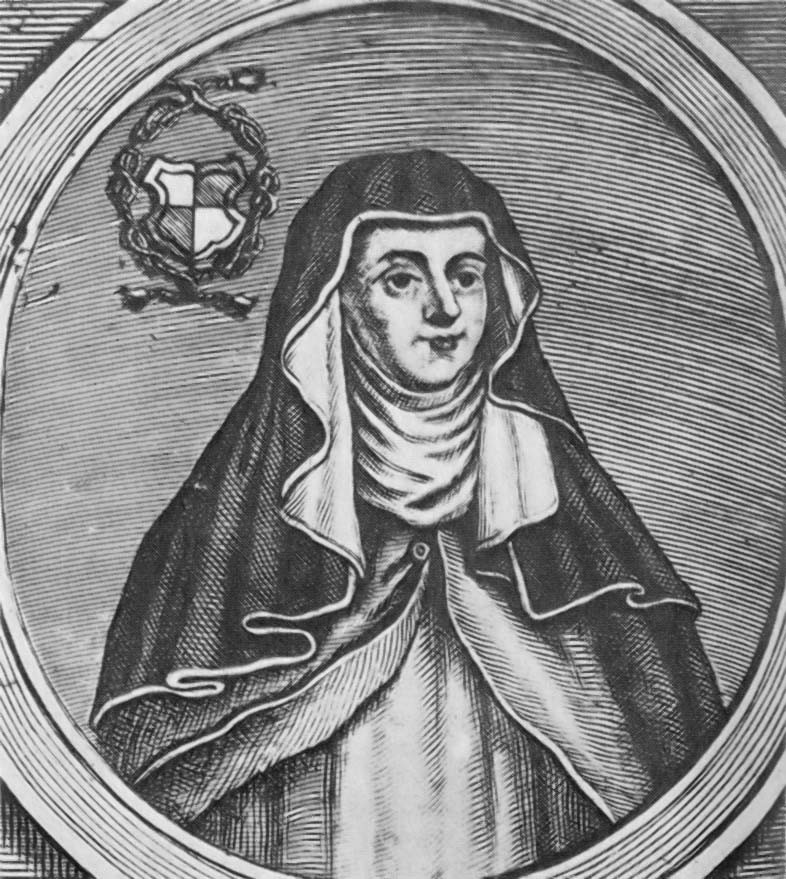
Hrotsvitha

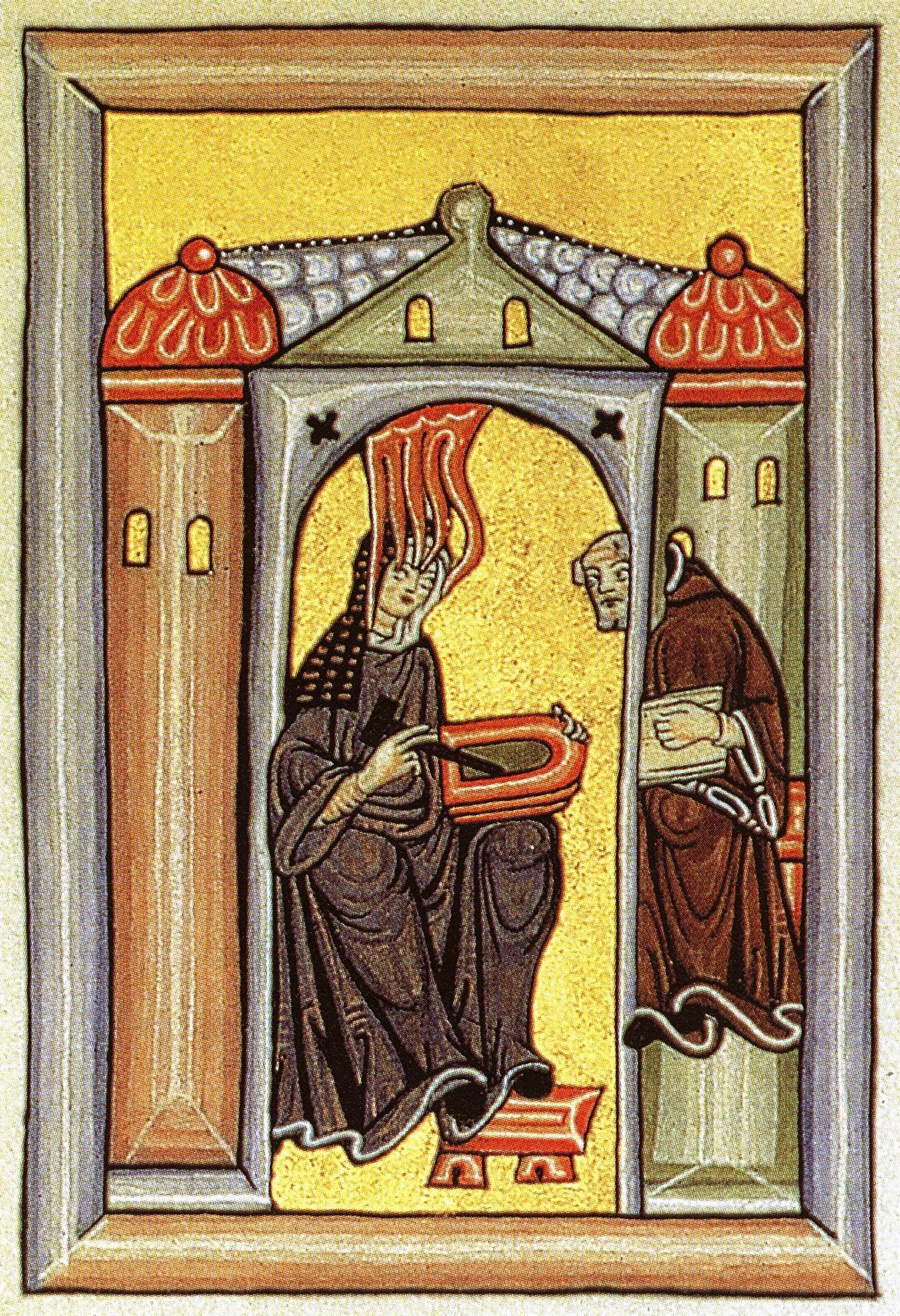
Hildegard of Bingen

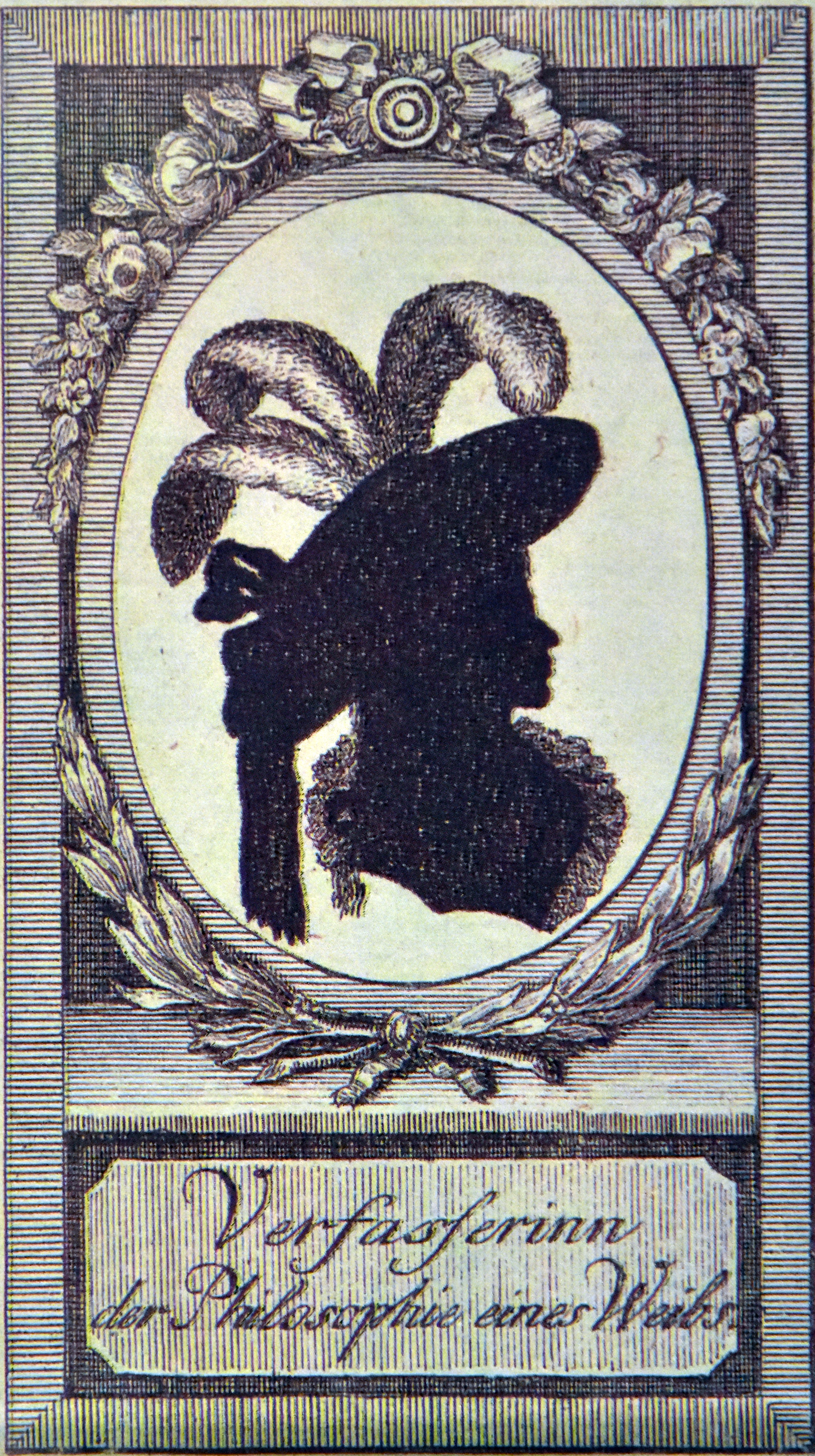
Marianne Ehrmann

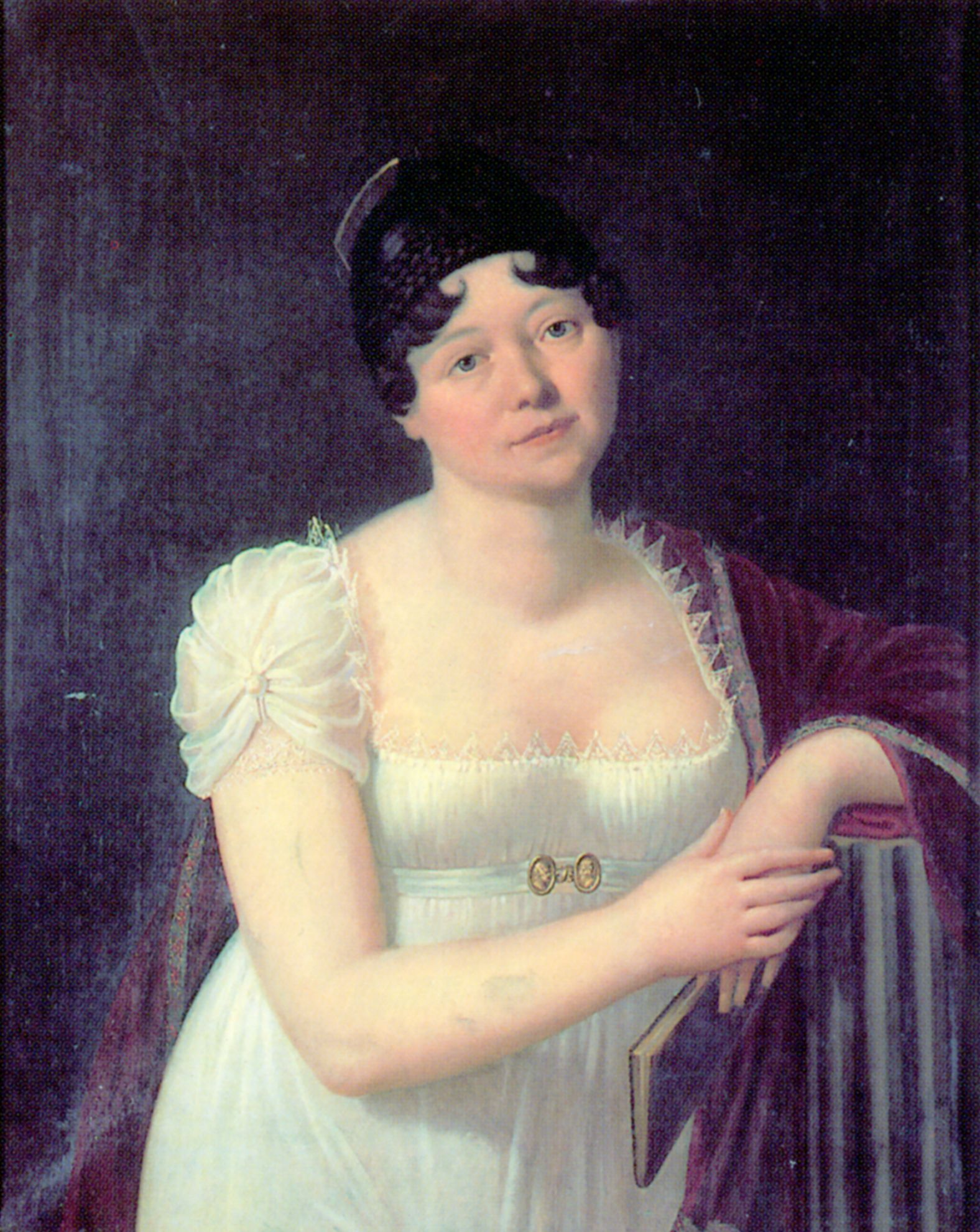
Caroline von Wolzogen

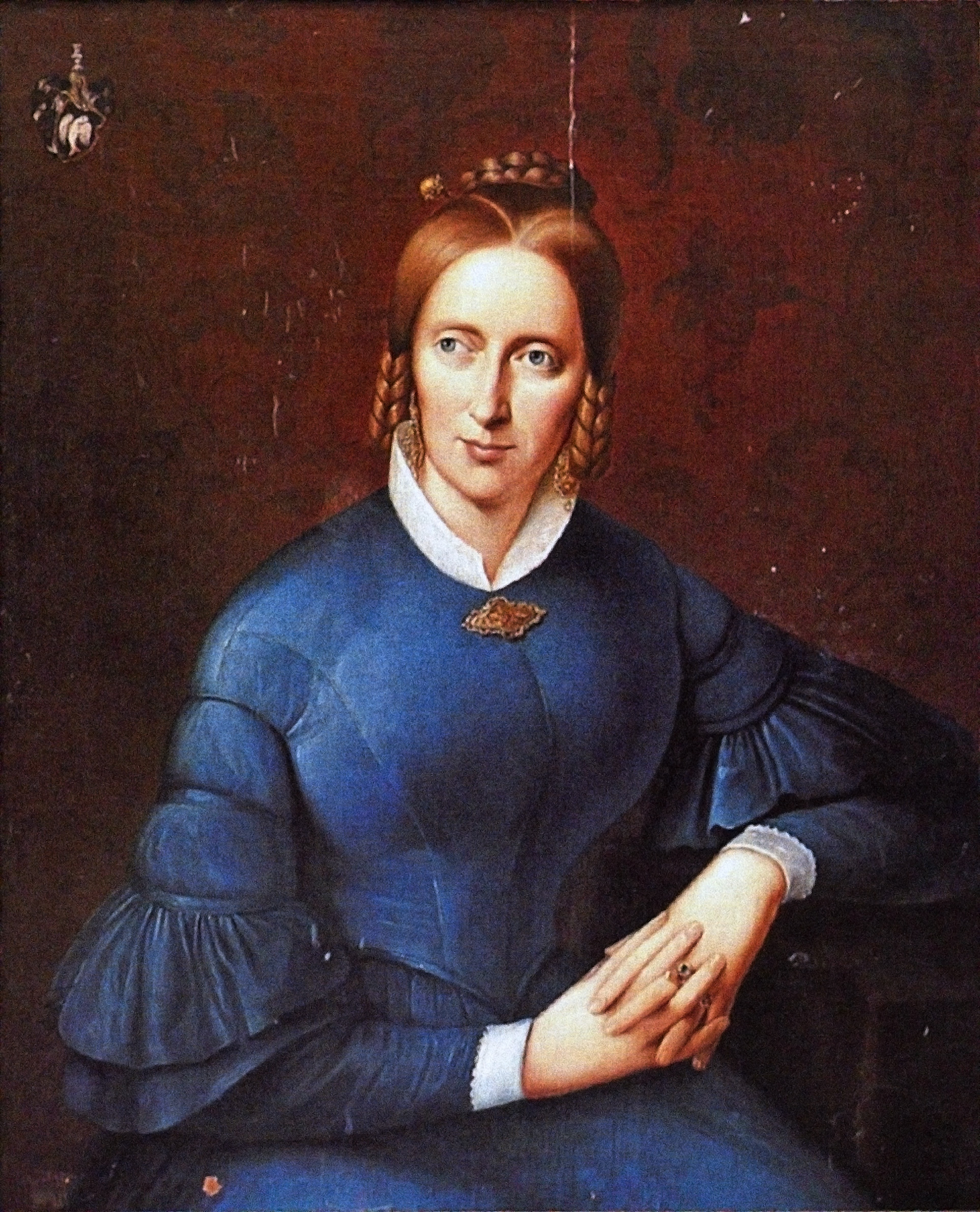
Annette von Droste-Hülshoff

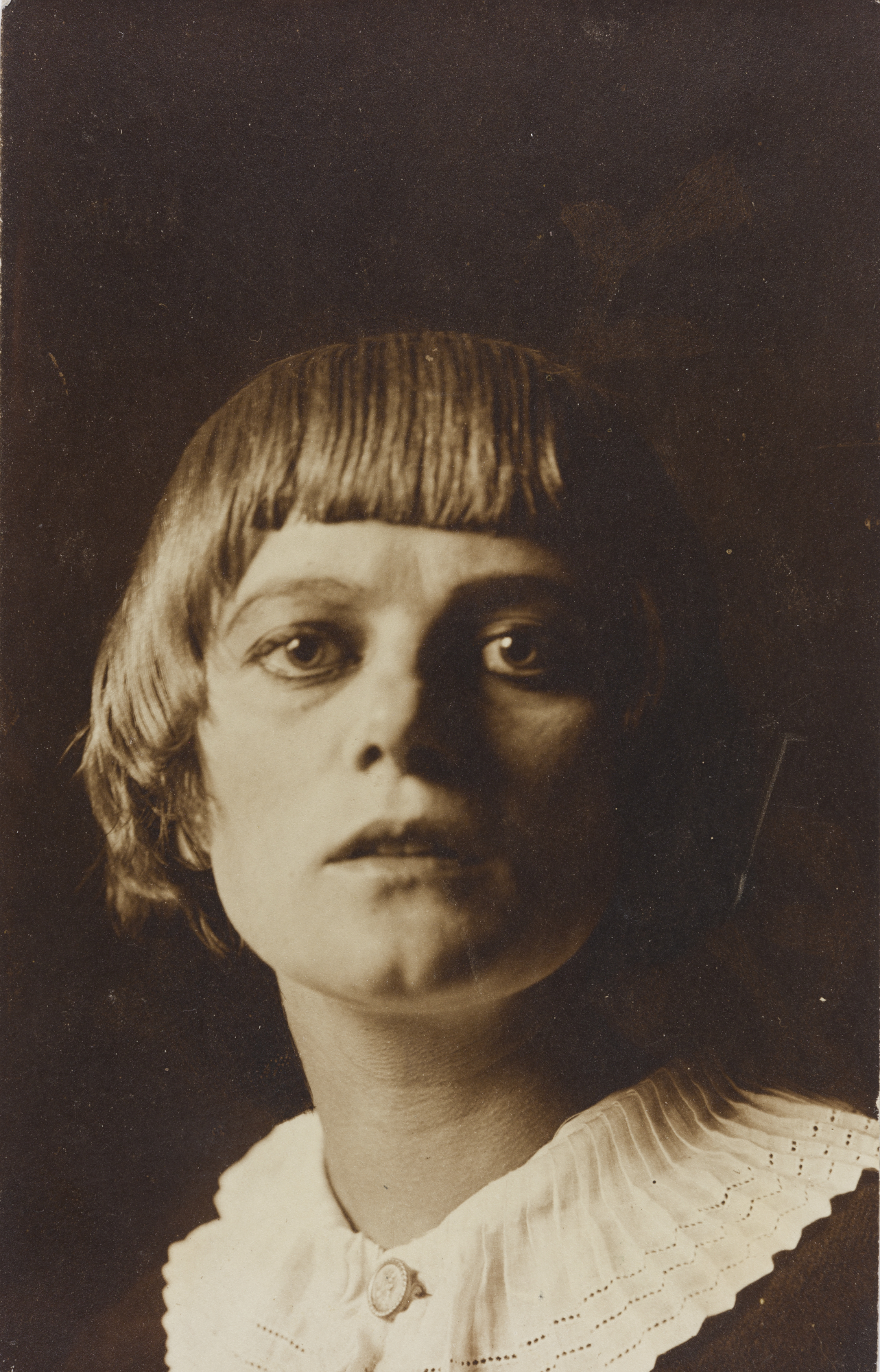
Emmy Hennings

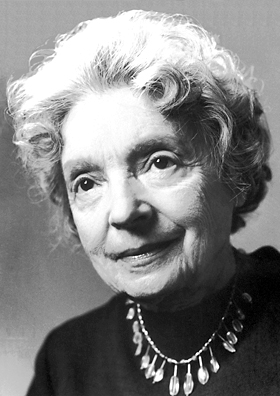
Nelly Sachs

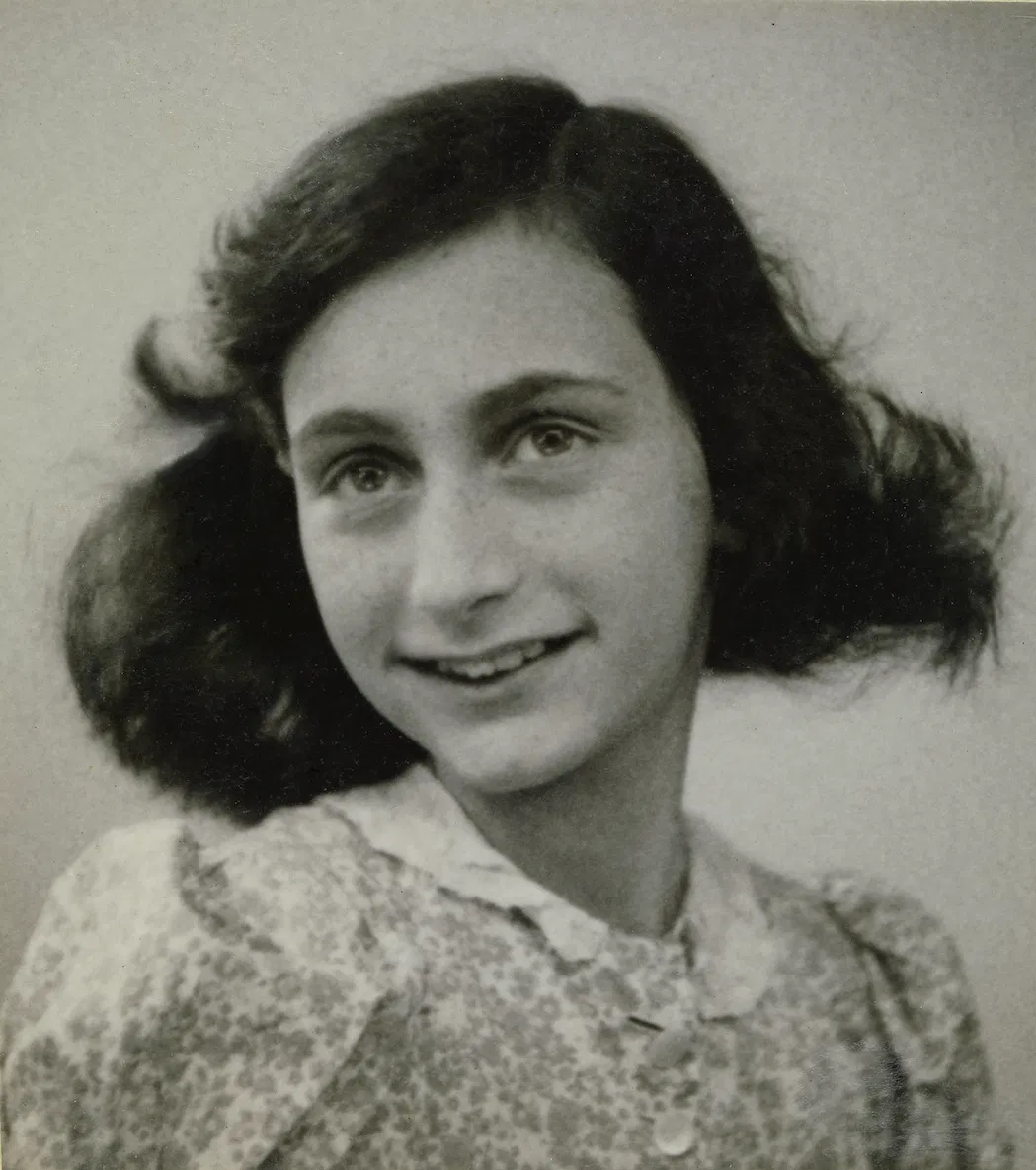
Anne Frank

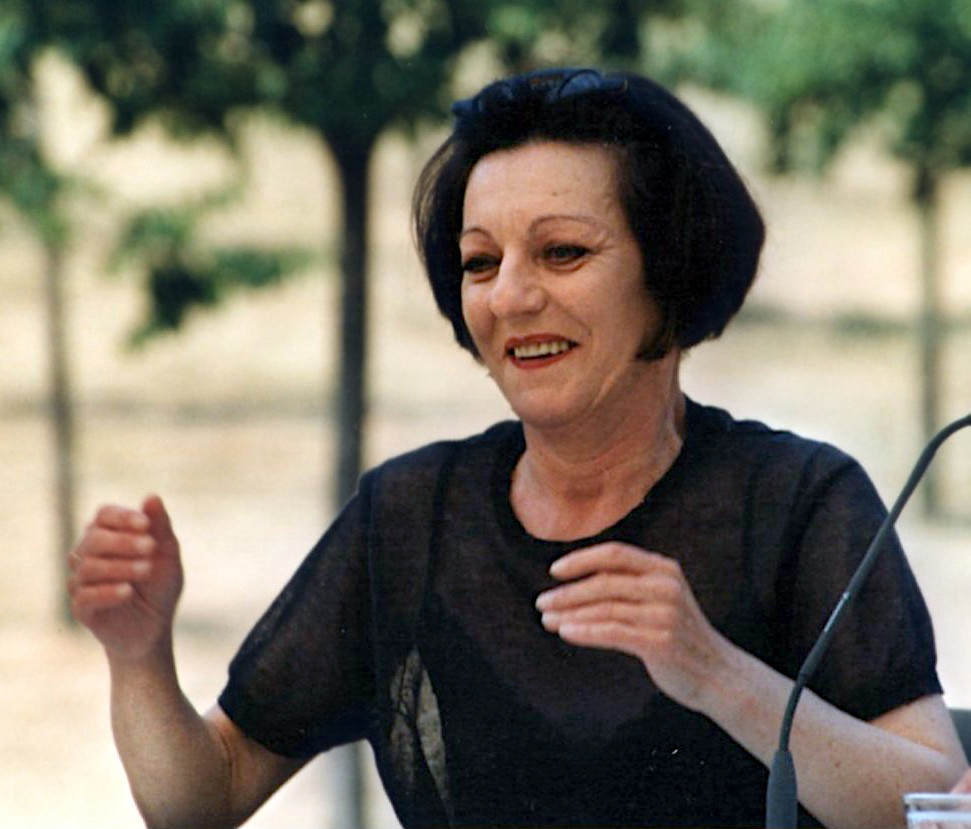
Herta Müller

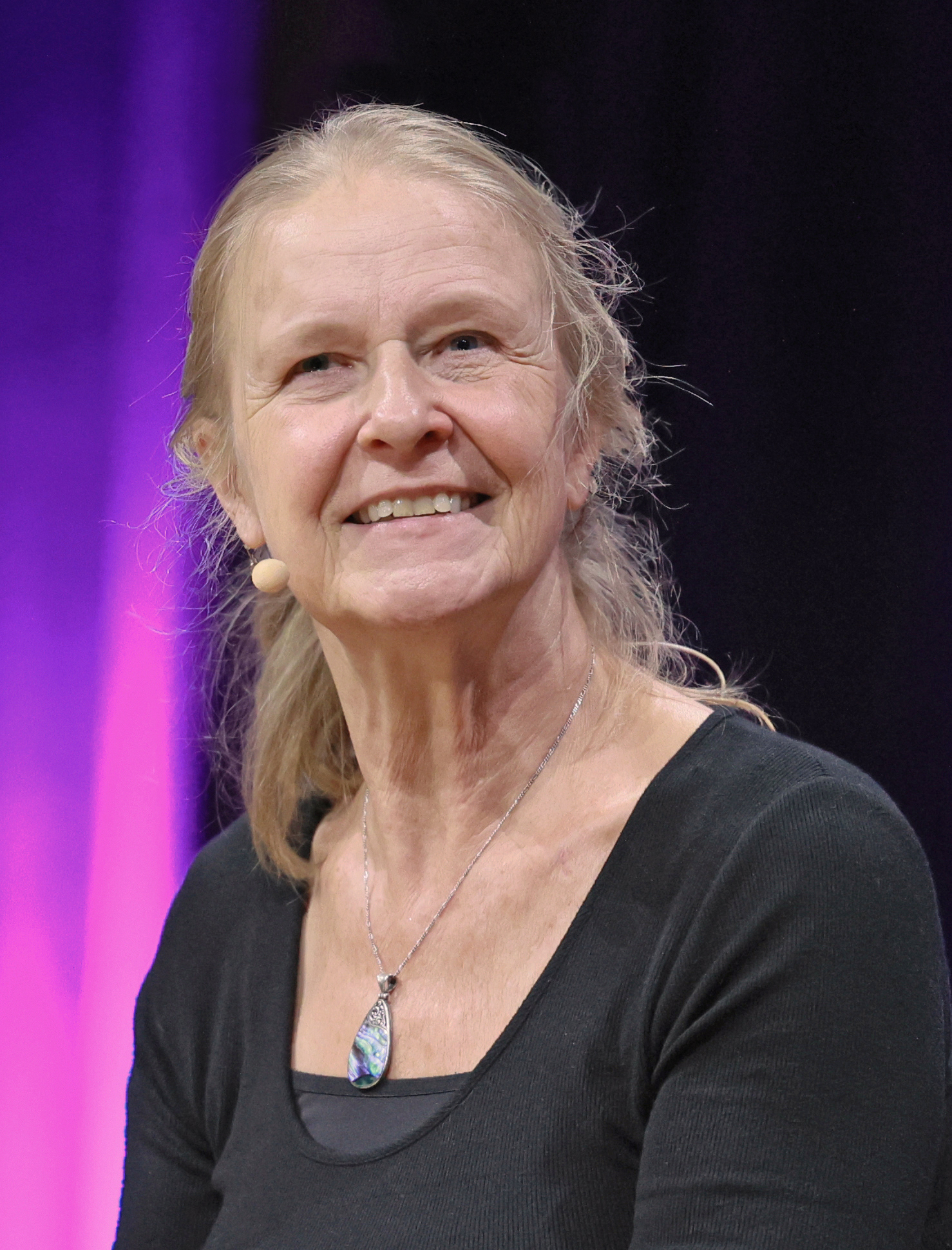
Cornelia Funke

== Nobel Prize laureates ==
The Nobel Prize in Literature has been awarded to German-language authors fourteen times (as of 2020), tying with French-language authors, or the second most often after English-language authors (with 32).

The following writers are from Germany unless stated otherwise:

Thomas Mann (1875–1955)	Hermann Hesse (1877–1962)	Günter Grass (1927–2015)

- 1902 Theodor Mommsen
- 1908 Rudolf Christoph Eucken
- 1910 Paul Heyse
- 1912 Gerhart Hauptmann
- 1919 Carl Spitteler (Swiss)
- 1929 Thomas Mann
- 1946 Hermann Hesse
- 1966 Nelly Sachs
- 1972 Heinrich Böll
- 1981 Elias Canetti (Bulgarian, later British)
- 1999 Günter Grass
- 2004 Elfriede Jelinek (Austrian)
- 2009 Herta Müller (Romanian by birth, later naturalized in West Germany)
- 2019 Peter Handke (Austrian)

== See also ==
- History of literature
- History of German (language)
- Goethe-Institut
- German-speaking Europe
- German studies
- Swiss literature
- Austrian literature
- Stiftung Lesen
- List of German-language authors
- List of German-language playwrights
- List of German-language poets
- List of German-language philosophers
- Sophie (digital lib)
- Luso-Germanic Literature
- Kindlers literature encyclopedia
- Media of Germany
  - Books in Germany
- Geographical distribution of German speakers
- Stereotypes of Jews in German literature

== Literature ==
=== English ===
- The Oxford Companion to German Literature, ed. by Mary Garland and Henry Garland, 3rd edition, Oxford University Press, 1997
- Grange, William, ed. Historical dictionary of German literature to 1945 (2011) online
- Alexandra Merley Hill, Hester Baer eds. German Women's Writing in the Twenty-first Century. United Kingdom, Camden House, 2015.
- Konzett, Matthias Piccolruaz. Encyclopedia of German Literature. Routledge, 2000.
- Pasley, Malcolm, ed. Germany: A Companion to German Studies. Methuen & Co., 1972 (2nd ed. 1982)
- Van Cleve, John W. (1986). The Merchant in German Literature of the Enlightenment. Chapel Hill.
- Van Cleve, John W. (1991). The Problem of Wealth in the Literature of Luther's Germany. Camden House.
- Walshe, M. O'C. Medieval German Literature. A Survey. Routledge & Kegan Paul, 1962.
- Cambridge History of German Literature. Watanabe-O’Kelly, Helen, ed. Cambridge and New York: Cambridge University Press, 1997.
- Kontje, Todd (2018). Imperial Fictions: German Literature Before and Beyond the Nation-State. Social History, Popular Culture, and Politics in Germany. University of Michigan Press. ISBN 978-0-472-13078-8.

=== German ===
- Bernd Lutz, Benedikt Jeßing (eds.): Metzler Lexikon Autoren: Deutschsprachige Dichter und Schriftsteller vom Mittelalter bis zur Gegenwart, Stuttgart und Weimar: 4., aktualisierte und erweiterte Auflage 2010
- Theo Breuer, Aus dem Hinterland. Lyrik nach 2000, Sistig/Eifel : Edition YE, 2005, ISBN 3-87512-186-4
- Theo Breuer, Kiesel & Kastanie (ed.): Von neuen Gedichten und Geschichten, Sistig/Eifel : Edition YE, 2008, ISBN 3-87512-347-6
- Jürgen Brocan, Jan Kuhlbrodt (eds.), Umkreisungen. 25 Auskünfte zum Gedicht, Leipzig: Poetenladen Literaturverlag, 2010
- Manfred Enzensperger (ed.), Die Hölderlin-Ameisen: Vom Finden und Erfinden der Poesie, Cologne: Dumont, 2005
- Peter von Matt, Die verdächtige Pracht. Über Dichter und Gedichte, Munich [etc.] : Hanser, 1998
- Joachim Sartorius (ed.), Mimima Poetica. Für eine Poetik des zeitgenössischen Gedichts, Cologne : Kiepenheuer & Witsch, 1999

=== Anthologies ===
- German poetry from 1750 to 1900, ed. by Robert M. Browning. Foreword by Michael Hamburger, New York : Continuum, 1984, 281 pp. (German Library), ISBN 0-8264-0283-6
- Twentieth-Century German Poetry: An Anthology, edited by Michael Hofmann, New York: Farrar, Straus, and Giroux, 2008 (Paperback Edition), 544 pp., ISBN 0-374-53093-9
- Heinz Ludwig Arnold (ed.), TEXT+KRITIK: Lyrik des 20. Jahrhunderts (1999).
- Verena Auffermann, Hubert Winkels (ed.), Beste Deutsche Erzähler (2000–)
- Hans Bender (ed.), In diesem Lande leben wir. Deutsche Gedichte der Gegenwart (1978)
- Hans Bender, Was sind das für Zeiten. Deutschsprachige Gedichte der achtziger Jahre (1988)
- Christoph Buchwald, Uljana Wolf (ed.), Jahrbuch der Lyrik 2009 (2009)
- Karl Otto Conrady (ed.), Der Große Conrady. Das Buch deutscher Gedichte. Von den Anfängen bis zur Gegenwart (2008).
- Hugo von Hofmannsthal (ed.), Deutsche Erzähler I (1912, 1979)
- Marie Luise Kaschnitz (ed.), Deutsche Erzähler II (1971, 1979)
- Boris Kerenski & Sergiu Stefanescu, Kaltland Beat. Neue deutsche Szene (1999)
- Axel Kutsch (ed.), Versnetze. Deutschsprachige Lyrik der Gegenwart (2009)
- Andreas Neumeister, Marcel Hartges (ed.), Poetry! Slam! Texte der Pop-Fraktion (1996)
