= Theo Breuer =

German poet, essayist, editor, translator and publisher (born 1956)

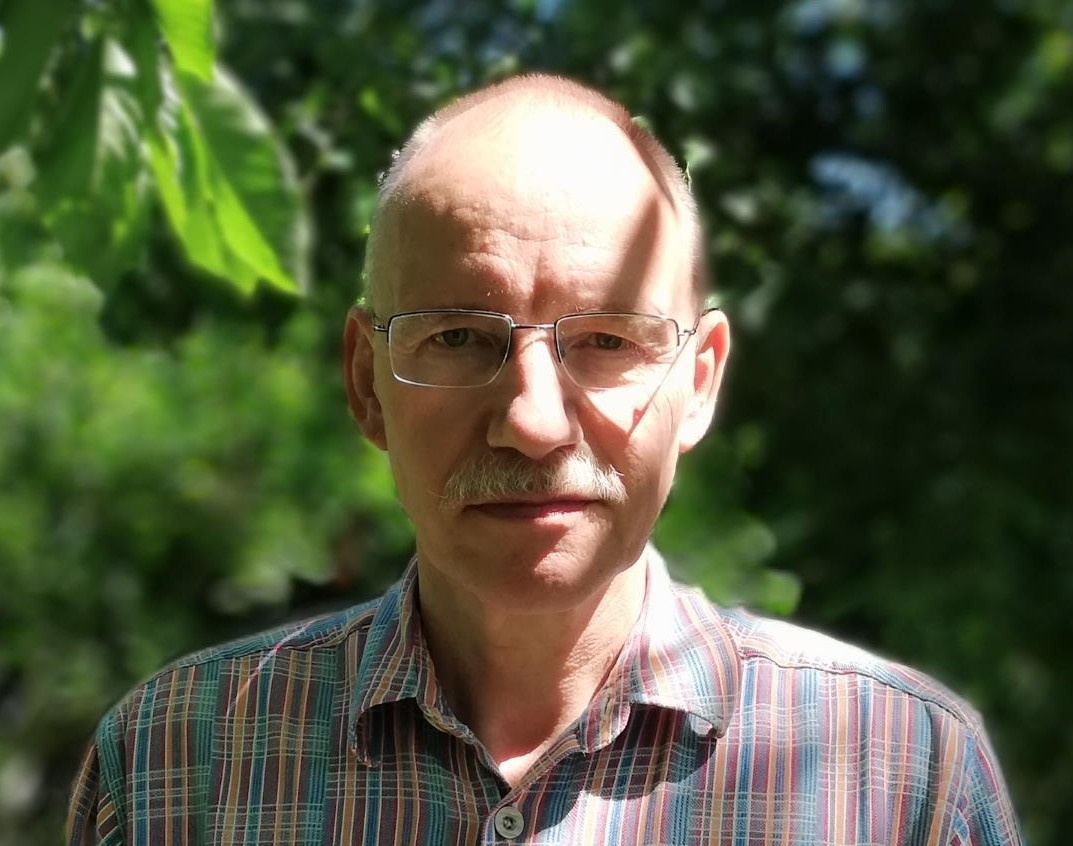
- Breuer in 2019
- Born: 30 March 1956 (age 70); Bürvenich, North Rhine-Westphalia, West Germany
- Education: University of Cologne
- Occupations: Poet; essayist; editor; translator; publisher

Theo Breuer (born 30 March 1956) is a German poet, essayist, editor, translator and publisher.

== Life and work ==
Theo Breuer was born in Bürvenich, North Rhine-Westphalia, West Germany and educated at Cologne University where he studied German and English linguistics and literature. He has written many books of poetry and essays on contemporary literature since 1988.

In collaboration with artists and poets in Canada, England, Italy, Japan, the US and many other countries, he has published experimental and visual poetry. In 2007, Redfoxpress (Dugort, Achill Island, County Mayo, Ireland) published Word Theatre, a selection of Breuer's visual poetry. Breuer has participated in numerous mail art projects since 1991 together with artists such as Ryosuke Cohen, Guillermo Deisler, David Dellafiora or György Galántai. He has written a number of long essays and monographs exploring the widely-ramifying possibilities of literary expression and verse-forms since 1989 and portraying poets such as Hans Bender, Thomas Bernhard, Rolf Dieter Brinkmann, Michael Hamburger, Ernst Jandl, Thomas Kling, Friederike Mayröcker, W. G. Sebald and plenty of others.

Theo Breuer's poems have been translated into Arabic, English, French, Georgian, Italian, Polish, Romanian and Russian and published in numerous national and international anthologies, calendars, catalogues, literary magazines, and the Internet. He has translated two books of poetry by Richard Berengarten (aka Richard Burns) into German: Tree (Baum, 1989) and Black Light (Schwarzes Licht, 1996). In 2009 he participated in Richard Berengarten, Volta: A Multilingual Anthology, issue 9 of The International Literary Quarterly (London).

At his small press, Edition YE, which he founded in 1993, Breuer has also published the poetry magazine Faltblatt (Flyer), the YE international anthology series, an assemblage with original art and handwritten poetry containing original works by approx. 300 authors and artists from 28 countries, among others John M. Bennett, Guillermo Deisler, or Michael Leigh, and a series of contemporary German poets.

As editor of an annual anthology of handwritten poetry he has collected original autographs by well-known poets such as Hans Bender, Richard Berengarten, Günter Kunert, Walter Helmut Fritz, Michael Hamburger and many more. Each issue of these hand-bound artists' books also contains original art by contemporary international artists.

As permanent freelancer of the German annual Muschelhaufen (edited by Erik Martin) from 1994 to 2008 Breuer contributed essays and reviews on mail art, contemporary poetry and prose as well as portraits on coeval authors and small presses.

A reader not only of his own poetry, Breuer presents overviews of German poetry from the beginnings in the Middle Ages up to the present in the 21st century.

Theo Breuer lives in the village of Sistig (municipality Kall) in the Eifel National Park near the Belgian border.

== Publications (selection) ==
=== Poetry ===
- Vorschlag zur Blüte, 2023.
- nicht weniger nicht mehr, 2021.
- Scherben saufen, 2019.
- Das gewonnene Alphabet, 2012.
- Wortlos (Wordless), 2009.
- Word Theatre. Visual Poetry, 2007.
- Nacht im Kreuz. (Night in the Cross), 2006.
- Land Stadt Flucht (Country City Getaway), 2002.
- Alpha und Omega und (Alpha and Omega and), 1998.
- Das letzte Wort hat Brinkmann (Brinkmann Has the Final Say), 1996.
- m%nday, 1996.
- Black Box. Visual Poetry, 1995.
- Der blaue Schmetterling (The Blue Butterfly), 1994.
- Mittendrin (Right in the Middle), 1991.
- Eifeleien (Eifel Poems), 1988.

=== Monographs ===
- Winterbienen im Urftland. Empfundene/erfundene Welten in Norbert Scheuers Gedichten und Geschichten, 2019.
- Zischender Zustand. Mayröcker Time, 2017.
- Kiesel & Kastanie. Von neuen Gedichten und Geschichten] (Pebble and Chestnut: New Poems and Prose), 2008.
- Aus dem Hinterland. Lyrik nach 2000] (From the Hinterland: Poetry Since 2000), 2005.
- Ohne Punkt & Komma: Lyrik in den 90er Jahren (Without Full Stop & Comma: Poetry in the Nineties), 1999.
