= Luso-Germanic literature =

Brazilian literature in the German language

Luso-Germanic literature comprises those literary texts written in the German language in Brazil. It may also include literature authored in Portuguese by German-speaking colonialists and settlers of Brazil. This includes literature written by descendants of Germany, Austria and the German-speaking part of Switzerland. In Portuguese it is known as literatura teuto-brasileira, and in German as deutschbrasilianische Literatur.

Luso-Germanic books may be printed either in Latin script or in Fraktur. Luso-Germanic works are generally composed in Standard German; however, it is not unusual for Brazilian Portuguese words to also be used.

== German Immigration to Brazil ==
The first German immigrants to settle in Brazil were 165 families who settled in Ilhéus, Bahia, in 1818. One year later, 200 families settled São Jorge, in the same state. Some Germans were brought to work in the Brazilian army after Independence from Portugal in 1822. However, the cradle of the German settlement in Brazil was São Leopoldo, in 1824. At that time Southern Brazil had a very low population density. Most of its inhabitants were concentrated on the coast and a few in the Pampas. The interior was covered by forests and populated by Indians. This lack of population was a problem, because Southern Brazil could easily be invaded by neighboring countries. Since Brazil was recently independent from Portugal, it was not possible to bring Portuguese immigrants. Germany was suffering the effects of the wars against Napoleon, overpopulation and poverty in the countryside. Many Germans were willing to immigrate to Brazil. Furthermore, Brazil's Empress, Maria Leopoldina, was Austrian and encouraged the arrival of German immigrants.

Luso-Germanic literature displays a strong sense of German nationalism. Poetry, short-stories and letters write of German heritage, German language and the desire and longing to preserve their German culture in the new Brazilian environment. It aims to construct a cultural identity, combining German patriotism with the realities of colonial life in Brazil.

The literature alerts individuals to cultural realities of Luso-Germanic life in the 19th century. This literature thrived until 1939 when the Nationalization Campaign of Getulio Vargas' Estado Novo prohibited the publication of texts written in foreign languages, especially in German as a result of the outbreak of WWII. The Brazilians did not want to be seen to associate themselves with Nazi regimes.

== Notable Authors and Works ==
Dr. Clemens Brandenburger

Helga Gronau

- Gefunden! In: Südamerikanische Literatur. Bd.2. São Leopoldo: Verlag Rotermund & Co, 1917.

Maria Kahle

- Deutsche Worte in gebundener und ungebundener Sprache. In: Südamerikanische Literatur. Bd.5. São Leopoldo: Verlag Rotermund & Co, 1917.

Wilhelm Rotermund

- Südamerikanische Literatur. Band 1-24. São Leopoldo: Verlag Rotermund & Co, 1917.

Carl Schüler

Bill Trotter

Gisela Wolf

- Marianne Günther. In: Südamerikanische Literatur. Bd.9. São Leopoldo: Verlag Rotermund & Co, 1917.
