= Bürvenich =

- Stadtteil of Zülpich
- Interactive map of Bürvenich
- Location within Germany Location within North Rhine-Westphalia
- Coordinates: 50°39′18″N 6°35′46″E
- Country: Germany
- State: North Rhine-Westphalia
- Town: Zülpich

Area
  - Total: 8.52 km^{2} (3.29 sq mi)
- Elevation: 209 m (686 ft)

Population (2016-12-31)
  - Total: 892
  - Density: 105/km^{2} (271/sq mi)
- Time zone: UTC+01:00 (CET)
  - Summer (DST): UTC+02:00 (CEST)
- Postal codes: 53909
- Dialling codes: 02425

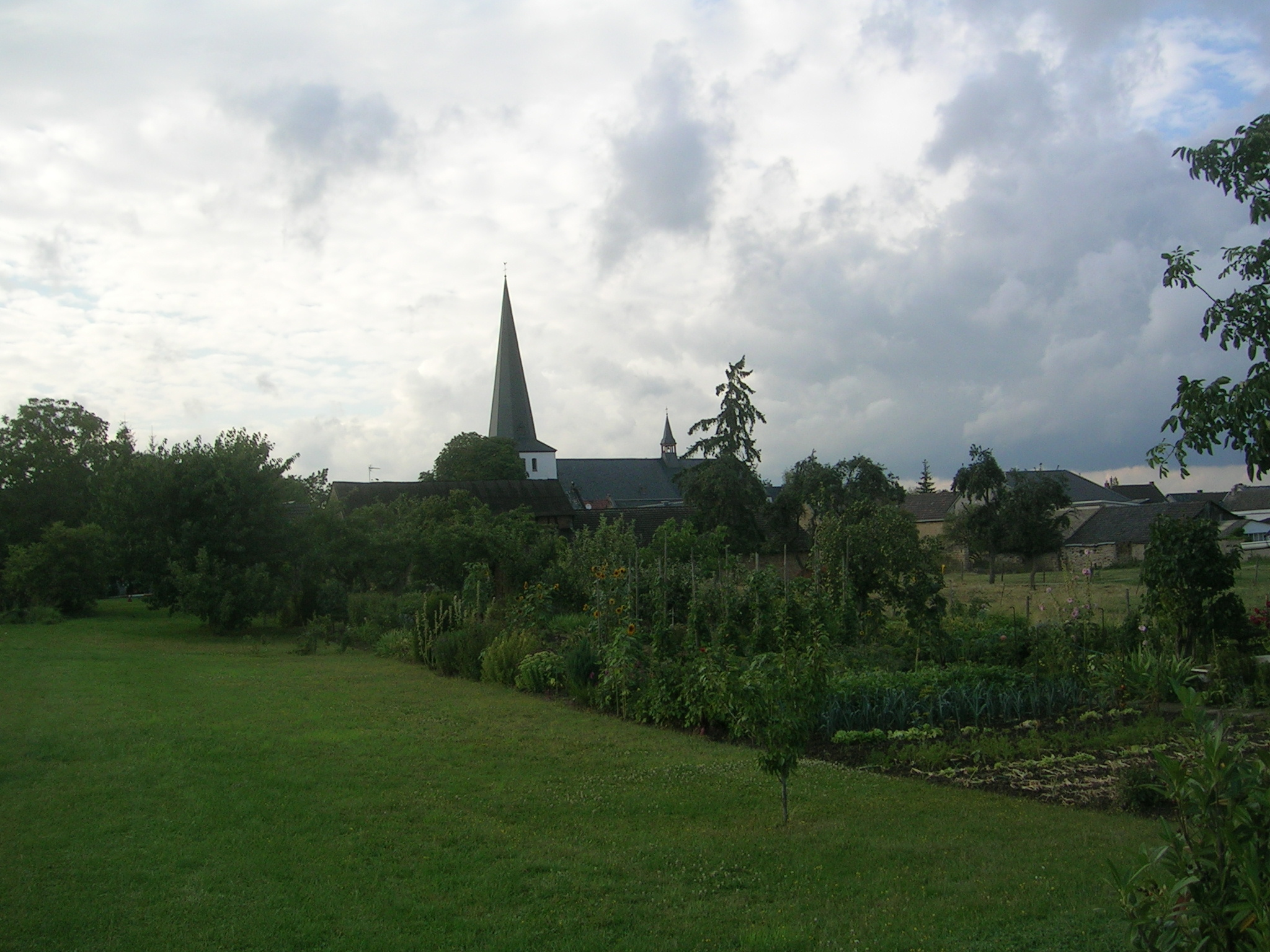
View of the village

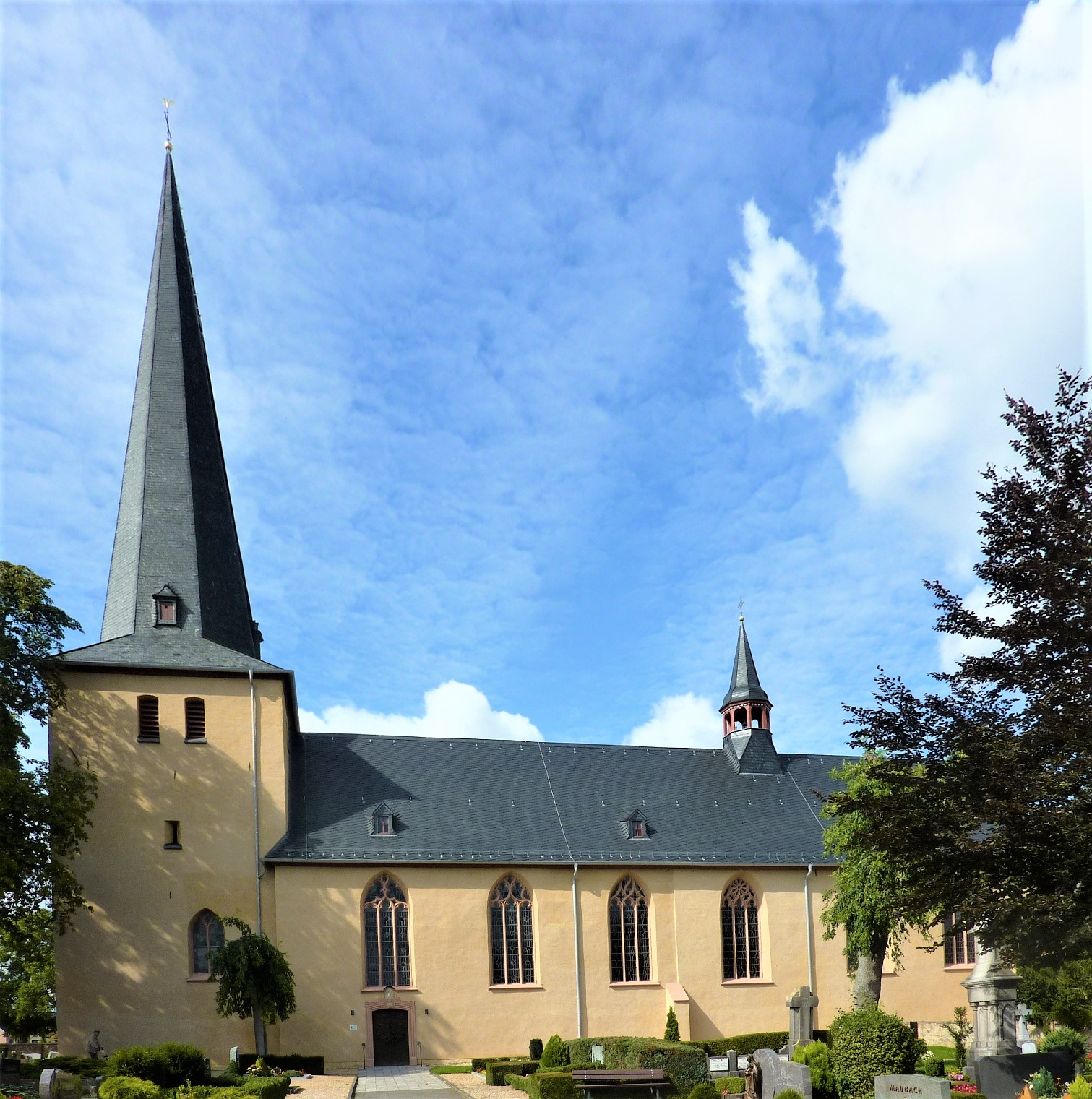
St. Stephen's Church

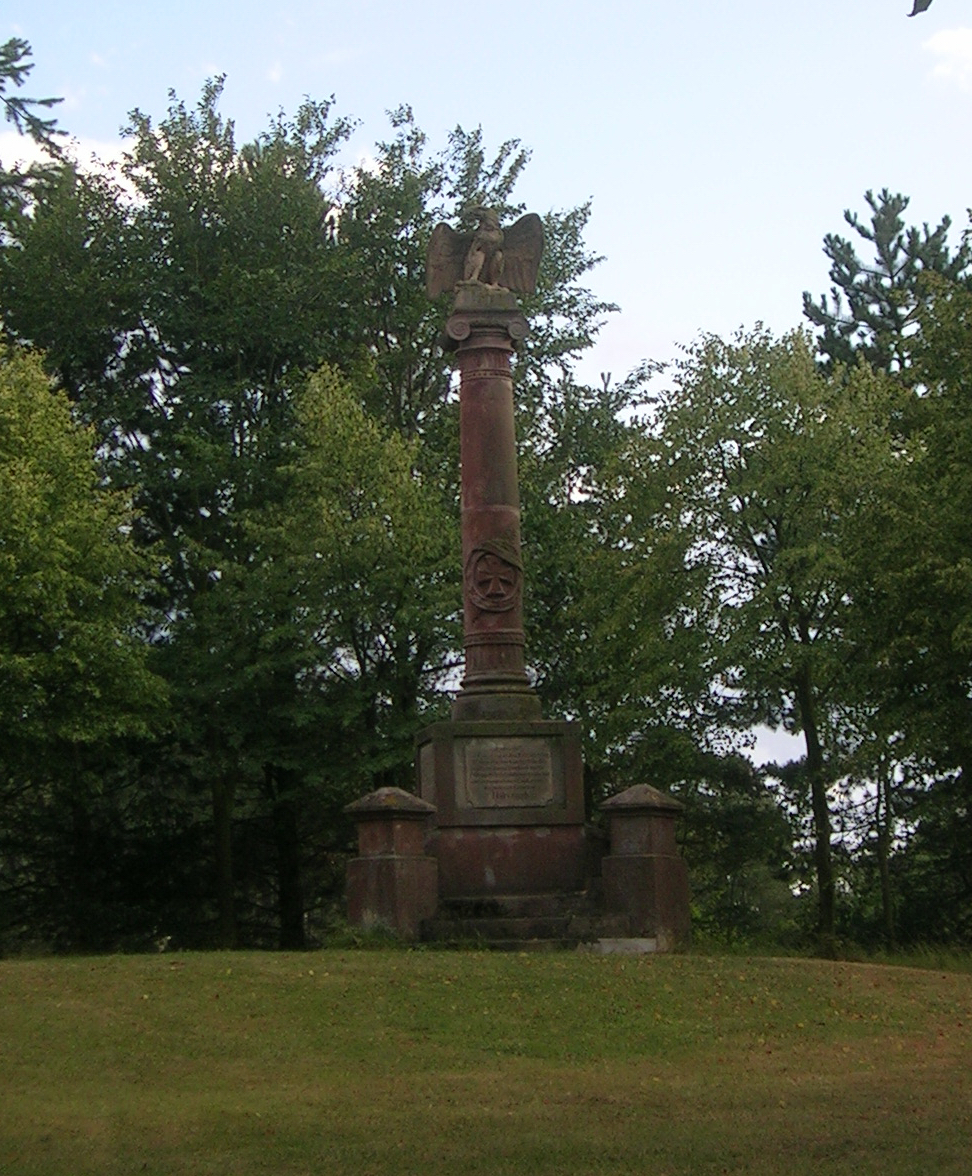
War memorial

Bürvenich is a village in the borough of Zülpich in the district of Euskirchen, North Rhine-Westphalia.

== Literature ==
- Christian Quix: Die Grafen von Hengebach. Die Schlösser und Städtchen Heimbach und Niedeggen. Die ehemaligen Klöster Marienwald und Bürvenich und das Collegiatstift nachheriges Minoriten Kloster vor Niedeggen; geschichtlich dargestellt. Hensen (publ.); Aachen, 1839 (E-Kopiw).
- Dohmen, Kristin; Heinen, Sigrun; Notarius, Christina (2015), "Die Pfarr- und Zisterzienserinnenkirche in Bürvenich. Bauforschung im Kontext der Denkmalinstandsetzung" (PDF), denkmalpflege.lvr.de, Jahrbuch der rheinischen Denkmalpflege 45 LVR-Amt für Denkmalpflege im Rheinland (in German), Worms: Wernersche Verlagsgesellschaft mbH, pp. 93–120, ISBN 978-3-88462-360-2
