= Sophie Digital Library of Works by German-Speaking Women =

American digital library

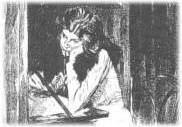
Logo

The Sophie Digital Library is a digital library and resource center for works produced by German-speaking women pre-17th century through the early 20th century, a group that has often been underrepresented in collections of historical printed works.

Resources available at the site include literary and journalistic texts (including some English translations), music scores and recordings, screenplays and dramas, and a collection of colonial/travel texts. There is also an image gallery containing portraits and photographs of the artists and illustrations from some of the works. Most of the texts included in its collection are the full texts of public domain books. The project tries to make these as free as possible, in long-lasting, easy to use, open formats which can be used on any computer. The collection provides the texts as aids for research and teaching.

== Publications ==
Since the beginning of The Sophie Project, undergraduate and graduate students, as well as academics, have been encouraged to expand their research of German-speaking women's writing. To foster such research, the Sophie Project has several different initiatives:

1. The Sophie Journal, an online peer-reviewed academic journal.
2. Anthologies and academic treatments of German-speaking women's writing, including the following volumes:
  - Down, Alec. Sophie Discovers Amerika: The Digital Companion. Utah: The Sophie Digital Library, 2014.
  - Down, Alec. Die deutsche Frau: An Anthology of German Women's Writing. The Sophie Digital Library, 2012.
  - McFarland, Rob. Red Vienna, White Socialism and the Blues: Ann Tizia Leitich's America. Rochester, NY: Camden House. 2015. ISBN 9781571139368
  - McFarland, Rob & Michelle Stott James. Sophie Discovers Amerika: German-speaking Women Write the New World. New York: Camden House, 2014.
  - Stott, Michelle. Im Nonnengarten: An Anthology of German Women's Writing, 1850–1907. Illinois: Waveland Press, 1997

== Copyright ==
The Sophie Project is careful to verify the status of all texts published to its website. Material is only added to the library if either a) Copyright permissions have been sought and received by the owner or b) the work is no longer protected by copyright laws. The Sophie Project does not claim new copyright on titles it publishes. Instead, it encourages their free reproduction and distribution. Many of the works published by The Sophie Project are present in the public domain and can be reproduced, distributed, copied and edited by users. Copyright owners that have given The Sophie Project particular permission to publish their work have been credited on their site, such as Gisela Brinker-Gabler and her work Deutsche Dichterinnen vom 16. Jahrhundert bis zur Gegenwart.
