= Norbert Scheuer =

German author (born 1951)

Norbert Scheuer (born December 16, 1951, in Prüm, Westeifel, Rheinland-Palatinate) is a German author.

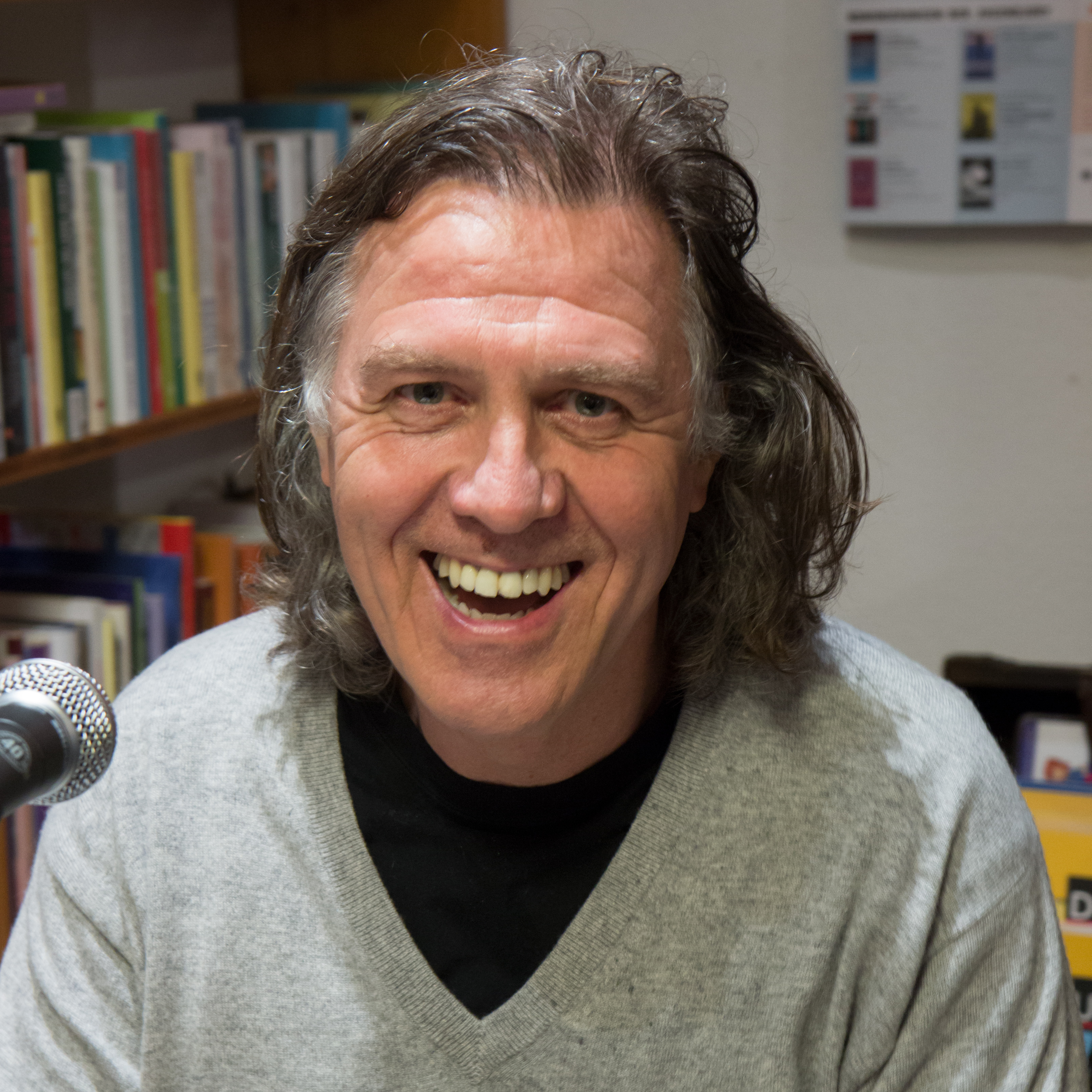
Norbert Scheuer in Offenburg, 2013

He earns a living as an IT system programmer for Deutsche Telekom and now lives in Keldenich, Kall, North Rhine-Westphalia in the area where he grew up, after lengthy periods spent in Düsseldorf and Bonn.

== Early career ==
Scheuer qualified as an electrician after secondary school then studied technology in Iserlohn. He then undertook further studies at the University of Düsseldorf and graduated in philosophy before completing his master's degree on the work of Kant. In 1994 he made his debut with a collection of short stories, Der Hahnenkönig, and this was followed in 1997 by a collection of poems, Ein Echo von allem. His 1999 Novel Der Steinesammler marked the beginning of his exploration of his own Eifel homeland.

== Public appearances ==
In 2012 and 2013, Scheuer was a participant in the Berlin International Literature Festival. He was poet in residence at the University of Duisburg-Essen in 2011 and held the Thomas-Kling Lectureship in Poetry at The University of Bonn in 2014 courtesy of the Kunststiftung NRW.

== Recent work ==
In 2015 his novel Die Sprache der Vögel was published in Germany. This made the shortlist of the Leipzig Book Fair Prize. Scheuer's work will be published in English for the first time with The Language of Birds appearing in June 2017. The novel recounts the experiences of a German Army medic deployed in the Afghanistan war in 2003, Paul Arimond. The horrors and banalities of everyday life threaten to overcome him but he finds refuge in the natural world and the exquisite beauty of birds

Scheuer has received numerous awards for his literary work.

== List of works ==
- Der Hahnenkönig. (Short stories) (1994) (Out of print)
- Ein Echo von allem. (Poems) Mainz : Hase & Koehler (1997) (Out of print)
- Der Steinesammler. (Novel) (1999; 2nd edn., 2010) Schöffling & Co. Frankfurt am Main ISBN 978-3-89561-300-5
- Flußabwärts. (Novel) (2002) C. H. Beck, München ISBN 978-3-406-49312-6
- Kall, Eifel. (Short stories) (2005) C. H. Beck, München ISBN 978-3-406-53554-3
- Überm Rauschen. (Novel) (2009) C. H. Beck, München ISBN 978-3-406-61041-7
- Bis ich dies alles liebte. (Poems) (2011) C. H. Beck, München ISBN 978-3-406-62172-7
- Peehs Liebe. (Novel) (2012) C. H. Beck, München ISBN 978-3-406-63949-4
- Die Sprache der Vögel. (Novel) (2015) C. H. Beck, München ISBN 978-3-406-67745-8 Translated as The Language of Birds. (2017) The University of Chicago Press for Haus Publishing, 2017. ISBN 978-1-910376-63-8
- Am Grund des Universums. (Novel) (2017) C. H. Beck, München ISBN 978-3-406-71179-4
- Winterbienen. (Novel) (2019) C. H. Beck, München ISBN 978-3-406-73963-7
- Mutabor. (Novel) (2022) C. H. Beck, München ISBN 978-3-406-78152-0

== Awards ==
- 2003: Martha-Saalfeld-Förderpreis
- 2004: Literary Prize of the Kunststiftung NRW
- 2006: 3sat-Prize at the Festival of German-Language Literature
- 2006: Georg-K.-Glaser Prize
- 2009: Shortlisted for the German Book Prize for Überm Rauschen
- 2010: Düsseldorfer Literaturpreis
- 2010: Rheinischer Literaturpreis Siegburg for Überm Rauschen
- 2015: Shortlisted for the Leipzig Book Fair Prize for Die Sprache der Vögel
- 2019: Wilhelm Raabe Literature Prize for Winterbienen

== Literature ==
- Theo Breuer: Winterbienen im Urftland. Empfundene/erfundene Welten in Norbert Scheuers Gedichten und Geschichten, Pop Verlag, Ludwigsburg 2019.
