= Anton Wildgans Prize =

Austrian literary award

The Anton Wildgans Prize of Austrian Industry is a literary award that was endowed in 1962 by the Federation of Austrian Industry. The prize is worth 15,000 Euro and is granted by an independent jury to a young or middle-aged writer of Austrian citizenship.

The award is dedicated to Anton Wildgans who, "like few others, embodied Austrian values in their best sense."

== Recipients ==
1962: Fritz Hochwälder
1963: Fritz Habeck
1964: Christine Lavant
1965: Andreas Okopenko
1966: Herbert Zand
1967: Thomas Bernhard
1968: Ilse Aichinger
1969: Herbert Eisenreich
1970: Peter Marginter
1971: Ingeborg Bachmann
1972: Milo Dor
1973: Barbara Frischmuth
1974: Ernst Hinterberger
1975: Christine Busta
1976: György Sebestyen
1977: Peter Henisch
1978: Wolfgang Kraus
1979: Matthias Mander
1980: Josef Winkler
1981: Friederike Mayröcker
1982: Ernst Jandl
1983: Jutta Schutting
1984: Peter Handke (rejected)
1985: Gerd-Klaus Kaltenbrunner
1986: Kurt Klinger
1987: Inge Merkel
1988: Christoph Ransmayr
1989: Ilse Tielsch
1990: no award
1991: Norbert Leser
1992: Anna Mitgutsch
1993: Gert Jonke
1994: Brigitte Hamann
1995: no award
1996: Michael Köhlmeier
1997: Evelyn Schlag
1998: Franz Josef Czernin
1999: Peter Rosei
2000: Elisabeth Reichart
2001: Vladimir Vertlib
2002: Ferdinand Schmatz
2003: Christoph Wilhelm Aigner
2004: Hans Raimund
2005: Barbara Neuwirth
2006: Wolfgang Hermann
2007: Sabine Gruber
2008: Kathrin Röggla
2009: Alois Hotschnig
2010: Doron Rabinovici
2011: Arno Geiger
2012: Olga Flor
2013: Norbert Gstrein
2014: Barbara Hundegger
2015: Erich Hackl
2016: Margit Schreiner
2017: Robert Seethaler
2018: Sabine Scholl
2019: Daniel Kehlmann
2021: Andrea Grill
2022: Gertraud Klemm
2023: Christoph W. Bauer
2024: Laura Freudenthaler
2025: Wolf Haas
2026: Karin Peschka
