= Enzensberger =

Enzensberger is a German surname. Notable people with the surname include:

- Christian Enzensberger (1931–2009), German academic, writer and translator
- Hans Magnus Enzensberger (1929–2022), German writer, poet, translator, and editor
- Horst Enzensberger (born 1944), German historian
- Josef Enzensberger (1914–1975), German Luftwaffe pilot
- Marianne Enzensberger (born 1947), German actress
- Theresia Enzensberger (born 1986), German journalist
- Ulrich Enzensberger (born 1944), German writer
