= Wittlin =

Wittlin is a surname. Notable people with the surname include:

- Alma Wittlin (1899–1992), Austrian writer
- Curt Wittlin (1941–2019), Swiss philologist
- Józef Wittlin (1896–1976), Polish novelist, poet, and translator
- Tadeusz Wittlin (1909–1998), Polish writer
