= Droste-Preis =

German literary award

Droste-Preis is a literary prize awarded in Baden-Württemberg, Germany. The city of Meersburg awards the Droste Prize in memory of the writer Annette von Droste-Hülshoff, who spent the last years of her life in Meersburg. It is awarded every three years. The award is endowed with €6,000 (First Prize (Literaturförderpreis): €4,000). The award is given only to women.

== Winners ==
- 1957 Erika Burkart
- 1960 Nelly Sachs
- 1963 Christine Busta
- 1967 Rose Ausländer
- 1971 Hilde Domin
- 1975 Eva Zeller
- 1979 Gertrud Leutenegger
- 1982 Dorothee Sölle, Maria Menz
- 1985 Marie-Thérèse Kerschbaumer
- 1988 Elisabeth Plessen
- 1991 Jenny Aloni
- 1994 Eveline Hasler
- 1997 Friederike Mayröcker
- 2000 Helen Meier
- 2003 Kathrin Schmidt, First prize: Julia Schoch
- 2006 Ulrike Draesner, First prize: Marion Poschmann
- 2009 Marlene Streeruwitz, First prize: Silke Scheuermann
- 2012 Helga M. Novak, First prize: Ulrike Almut Sandig
- 2015 Judith Schalansky, First prize: Teresa Präauer
- 2018 Olga Flor, First prize: Julia Weber
- 2021 Katharina Hacker, First prize: Laura Freudenthaler
- 2024 Esther Kinsky, First Prize: Katharina Mevissen
