= Karin Struck =

German author (1947–2006)

Karin Struck (14 May 1947, Groß Kiesow – 6 February 2006) was a German author. She won the Rauris Literature Prize and the Andreas Gryphius Prize. She had generally been seen as a writer of women's literature and to the Left. However, in 1991 and 1992 she expressed her opposition to abortion and regret at having had one. She has been described by one feminist source as "one of the most outspoken female writers who openly opposes abortion." In 1996 she converted to the Roman Catholic Church.

== Selected works ==
- Klassenliebe 1973
- Die Mutter 1975
- Lieben 1977
- Die liebenswerte Greisin 1977
- Trennung 1978
- Die Herberge 1981
- Kindheits Ende 1982
- Zwei Frauen 1982
- Finale 1984
- Glut und Asche 1985
- Bitteres Wasser 1988
- Blaubarts Schatten 1991
- Ich sehe mein Kind im Traum 1992
- Männertreu, München 1992
- Ingeborg B. – Duell mit dem Spiegelbild 1993
- Annäherungen an Ingeborg Bachmann 2003
- HARMONYTES [2012/2013]STUDENTS - SIREZ
