= Edmund Blum =

Edmund Blum (9 September 1874 in Steinamanger/Szombathely Hungary – 14 April 1938 in Vienna) was an Austrian author and dentist.

== Life ==
Edmund Blum was born in 1874, the son of Alexander Blum and Julia Blum née Lazarus. He studied in Vienna, where 29. April 1898 he received a doctorate degree in medicine. He was also a writer and publisher.

== Career ==
Blum wrote over 25 books and also used the pseudonym E. B. Junkh. In 1920 he founded his own publishing house, called E.B. Seps, in Vienna. His first book was „Warum lassen sich die Juden nicht taufen?!“ published by 0. Th. Scholl. Later, in 1928, he founded a second publishing house, „Bergis Verlag Wien,“ which published other authors including Max Epstein, Hermann W. Anders, Hellmut Schlien, Fritz v. Unruh, and Berthold Sprung. Edmund Blum died 14. April 1938 in Vienna.

== Publications ==
- Warum lassen sich die Juden nicht taufen?! (1913)
- Das Brauthemd (1919)
- Die Gefallene (1920)
- Die Halbjuden (1920)
- Junggesellennot, sexual-psychologischer Roman (1920)
- Die Lüsterne (1922)
- Die Gelegenheitsmacherin (1922)
- Magdas Fehltritt (1923)
- Die Hochzeitsnacht (1923)
- Die Verführte (1923)
- Judenhaß (1923)
- Ohne Wollust (1923)
- Sommerbräutigam
- Die Sumpfblume und andere Wiener Novellen (1923)
- Lebt Gott noch? Krise der Weltanschauung (1928)
- Die Damen Bolzani (1932)
- Des Selbstmörders Schwester (1932)
- Das Eheexperiment (1920)
- Sein Venusdienst (1923)
- Mädis Irrwege (1925)
- Die Verführte (1923)
- Der Hund und die Liebe (1923)
- Treu bis Neapel (1923)
- Die Schande (1923)
- Schach der Liebe (1923)

== See also ==
- List of Austrian writers
