= Christa Reinig =

German poet, writer and dramatist

- Born: 6 August 1926; Berlin, Germany
- Died: 30 September 2008 (aged 82); Munich, Germany
- Occupations: German poet, fiction and non-fiction writer, and dramatist

Christa Reinig (6 August 1926, in Berlin – 30 September 2008, in Munich) was a German poet, fiction and non-fiction writer, and dramatist. She began her career in the Soviet occupation zone which became East Berlin, was banned there, after publishing in West Germany, and moved to the West in 1964, settling in Munich. She was openly lesbian. Her works are marked by black humor, and irony.

== Life and career ==
Reinig was raised in eastern Berlin by her mother, Wilhelmine Reinig, who was a cleaning woman. After the end of the Second World War, Reinig was a Trümmerfrau, and worked in a factory. She also sold flowers on the Alexanderplatz in the 1940s. In the 1950s, she obtained her Abitur at night school, and went on to study art history at Humboldt University, after which she took a job at the Märkisches Museum, the museum of the history of Berlin, and the Mark Brandenburg, where she worked, until she left Berlin for the West.

She made her literary début in the late 1940s in the satirical magazine Ulenspiegel, at the urging of Bertolt Brecht; she had been working there as an editor. In 1956, her "Ballade vom blutigen Bomme" ("Ballad of Bloody Bomme", first published in 1952) was included in Walter Höllerer's poetic anthology Transit, which brought her to the attention of readers in the West; one writer in 1963 referred to its "strange mix of benevolent cynicism and bottomless sadness". However, she was largely forbidden to publish in the East, beginning in 1951, while she was still a student. She was already involved in the West Berlin Gruppe Zukunftsachlicher Dichter (group of future-reasoning writers), and continued to publish both poetry and stories with West German publishers.

In 1964, after her mother's death, Reinig travelled to West Germany to receive the Bremen Literature Prize and stayed there, settling in Munich. She had ankylosing spondylitis; she left her desk at the museum empty, except for an X-ray of her crooked spine.

In 1971, she broke her neck in a fall on a spiral staircase; inadequate medical care left her severely disabled, and having to survive on a government pension. She could not use a typewriter again, until being fitted with specially made prismatic spectacles in 1973, after which she wrote her first novel, the autobiographical Die himmlische und die irdische Geometrie (The Heavenly and the Earthly Geometry), which she completed in 1974.

Reinig died on 30 September 2008 in the Catholic care home, where she had moved at the start of that year. She left her papers to the German Literature Archive in Marbach am Neckar.

== Themes and types of writing ==
Reinig began as a lyric poet, and her voice is frequently allegorical and metaphysical, as well as characterised by black humor, irony, brash, life-affirming sarcasm, and an "extremely refined simplicity". She was known as a rebel, who went her own way. She felt like an outsider both in East Germany, despite her proletarian background, and in the feminist movement.

Her first published short story came in 1946, "Ein Fischerdorf"; and between 1949 and 1951, she wrote stories about women living without men; however, for 25 years after that, until the autobiographical Die himmlische und die irdische Geometrie, a "pre-feminist" work in female voice, men were at the centre of her work. For a decade beginning in the mid-1970s, she was an avowedly feminist writer. Her 1976 satirical novel, Entmannung, reveals the patriarchalism in both men's and women's thinking processes, and led to her coming out; in the 1979 cycle of poems, Müßiggang ist aller Liebe Anfang (later published in English translation as Idleness is the Root of All Love), she expressed her lesbianism in her work for the first time. Reinig said of herself in an interview at sixty, "I am a lesbian writer just as much as I am a woman writer", but she found herself marginalised by the literary establishment as a feminist writer, and a lesbian; Entmannung, which means "emasculation", has been described, by a conservative German historian, as "a grotesque spearpoint of feminism". At the end of the 1980s, she left the feminist movement; in Müßiggang ist aller Liebe Anfang, she had written: "Sometimes the gay shirt is closer to me than the feminist skirt." She also translated Russian literature, and wrote audio dramas. Her last publication, in 2006, was a volume of philosophical thoughts titled, Das Gelbe vom Himmel (The Yellow from Heaven).

== Works ==
=== Poetry ===
- Die Steine von Finisterre. 1961. Partial trans. Ruth and Matthew Mead, The Tightrope Walker. Edinburgh: Rutherford, 1981. OCLC 17565306
- Gedichte. Frankfurt: Fischer, 1963. OCLC 1318938
- Schwabinger Marterln. Freche Grabsprüche für Huren, Gammler und Poeten. Stierstadt im Taunus: Eremiten, 1969. OCLC 473044494
- Schwalbe von Olevano. Stierstadt im Taunus: Eremiten, 1969. OCLC 288414
- Papantscha-Vielerlei: Exotische Produkte Altindiens. Stierstadt im Taunus: Eremiten, 1971. ISBN 978-3-87365-018-3
- Die Ballade vom Blutigen Bomme. Düsseldorf: Eremiten, 1972. ISBN 978-3-87365-035-0
- Müßiggang ist aller Liebe Anfang. Düsseldorf: Eremiten, 1979. ISBN 978-3-87365-142-5. Munich: Frauenoffensive, 1980. ISBN 978-3-88104-094-5. Trans. Ilze Mueller. Idleness is the Root of All Love. Corvallis, Oregon: Calyx, 1991. ISBN 978-0-934971-22-5
- Sämtliche Gedichte. Düsseldorf: Eremiten, 1984. ISBN 978-3-87365-198-2
- Die Prüfung des Lächlers: Gesammelte Gedichte. Munich: DTV, 1970, 1984. ISBN 978-3-423-06301-2

=== Stories ===
- "Eine Ruine" (1949) and "Ein Fischerdorf" (1951) in Anthologien der DDR
- Der Traum meiner Verkommenheit. Berlin: Fietkau, 1961. OCLC 163764389
- Drei Schiffe: Erzählungen, Dialoge, Berichte. Frankfurt: Fischer, 1965. OCLC 1998542
- Orion trat aus dem Haus: neue Sternbilder. Stierstadt im Taunus: Eremiten, 1968. OCLC 4630562
- Das grosse Bechterew-Tantra: Exzentrische Anatomie. Stierstadt im Taunus: Eremiten, 1970. ISBN 978-3-87365-007-7
- Hantipanti: zwölf Kindergeschichten zum Nachdenken und ein Nachwort. Weinheim: Beltz, 1972. OCLC 774249287
- Clever Elsie, Frederick and Catherine, and The Goose Girl Meets The Four Bremen City Musicians. Weinheim: Beltz & Gelberg, 1976. ISBN 3-407-80518-7
- Der Wolf und die Witwen: Erzählungen und Essays. Düsseldorf: Eremiten, 1980. ISBN 978-3-87365-151-7. Munich: Frauenoffensive, 1981. ISBN 978-3-88104-108-9
- Die ewige Schule. Munich: Frauenoffensive, 1982. ISBN 978-3-88104-116-4
- Nobody and other stories. Düsseldorf: Eremiten, 1989. ISBN 978-3-87365-246-0
- Glück und Glas. Düsseldorf: Eremiten, 1991. ISBN 978-3-87365-262-0
- Simsalabim. Düsseldorf: Eremiten, 1991. ISBN 978-3-87365-316-0
- Der Frosch im Glas: neue Sprüche. Düsseldorf: Eremiten, 1994. ISBN 978-3-87365-288-0

=== Novels ===
- Die himmlische und die irdische Geometrie. Düsseldorf: Eremiten, 1975. ISBN 978-3-87365-080-0
- Entmannung: die Geschichte Ottos und seiner vier Frauen. Düsseldorf: Eremiten, 1976. ISBN 978-3-87365-096-1
- Die Frau im Brunnen. Munich: Frauenoffensive, 1984. ISBN 978-3-88104-139-3

=== Audio plays ===
- Kleine Chronik der Osterwoche. 1965
- Tenakeh. 1965
- Wisper. 1967
- Das Aquarium. 1967

=== Non-fiction ===
- Das Gelbe vom Himmel: Betrachtungen. Düsseldorf: Eremiten, 2006. ISBN 978-3-87365-340-5

=== Translations ===
- Marina Zwetajewa. Gedichte. Berlin: Wagenbach, [1968]. OCLC 164182941

== Honours ==
- 1964 Bremen Literature Prize, for Gedichte
- 1965 Villa Massimo Fellowship
- 1968 Hörspielpreis der Kriegsblinden, for Das Aquarium
- 1969 Toucan Prize of the City of Munich (with five others), for Schwabinger Marterln
- 1973 Literary Award of the Bavarian Academy of Fine Arts
- 1975 German Critics' Prize, for Die Prüfung des Lächlers
- 1976 Cross of Merit of the Federal Republic of Germany
- 1984 SWR-Bestenliste Prize, for Sämtliche Gedichte
- 1993 Roswitha Prize of the City of Bad Gandersheim
- 1999 Brandenburg Literature Prize
- 2003 Kester-Haeusler Award of the German Schiller Foundation

== Sources ==
- "Abgestorbener Raum". Interview with Jo Wünsche. Alternative 20 (April 1977) 68–72 (in German)
- Peter Horn. Christa Reinig und das "weibliche Ich". In Frauenliteratur: Autorinnen, Perspektiven, Konzepte. Ed. Manfred Jurgensen. Bern: Lang, 1983. ISBN 978-3-261-05013-7. pp. 101–22 (in German)
- Sibylle Scheßwendter. Darstellung und Auflösung von Lebensproblemen im Werk: Christa Reinig. Doctoral thesis, University of Siegen, 2000. pdf (in German)
