= Julya Rabinowich =

Austrian author and painter (born 1970)

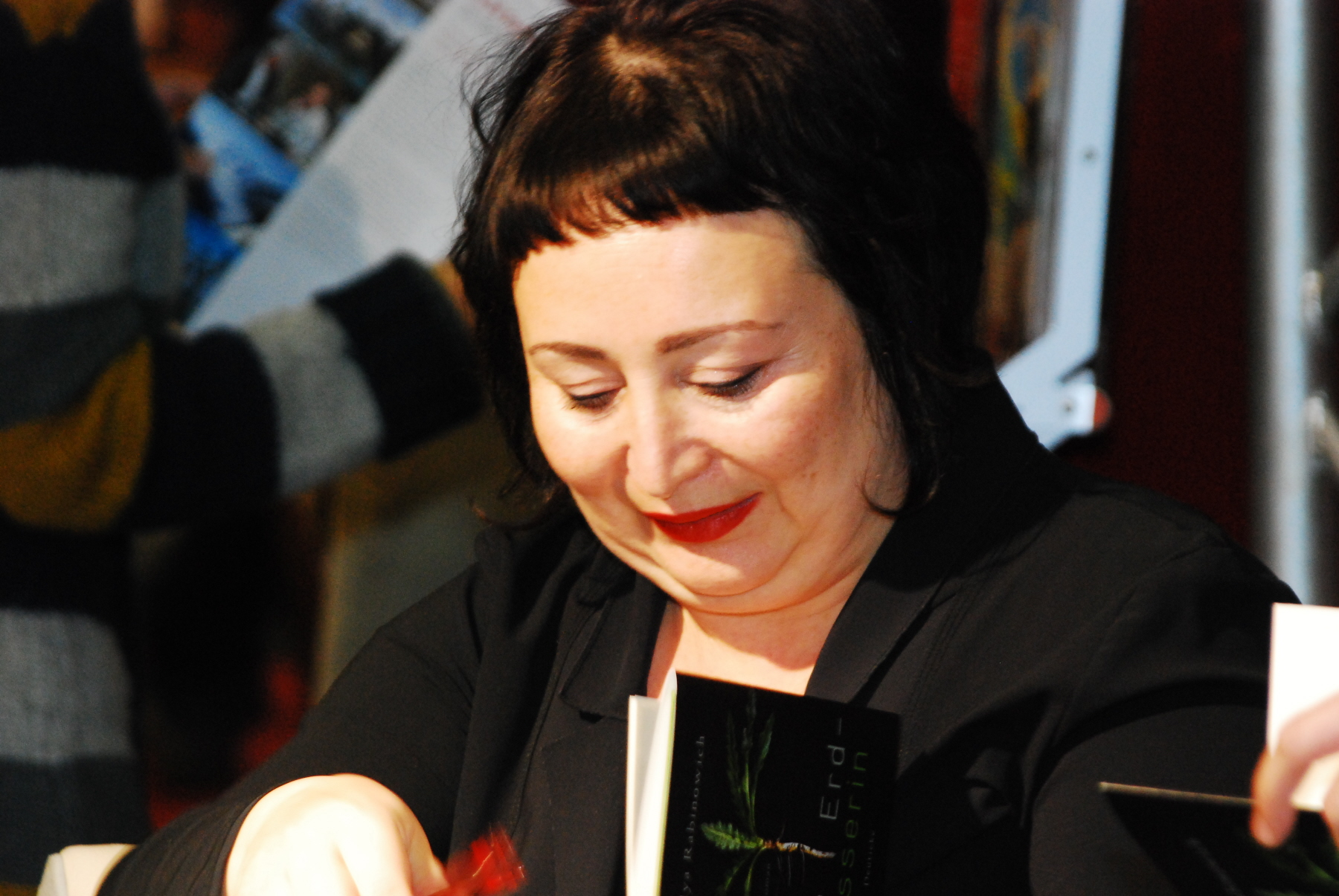
Julya Rabinowich at Vienna Buchmesse 2012

Julya Rabinowich (Russian: Юля Борисовна Рабинович; born 1970 in Leningrad, (now Saint Petersburg, Russia) is an Austrian author, playwright, painter and translator. In 1977 her family emigrated to Vienna, a move in which she describes herself as having been “uprooted and re-potted.”

== Life ==
Rabinowich is the daughter of artist and designer Boris Rabinowich (1938–1988) and artist Nina Werzhbinskaja-Rabinowich who, with their family, emigrated from the Soviet Union to Vienna in December 1977. Rabinowich has a daughter, born in 1995.

From 1993–1996, Rabinowich studied at the University of Vienna to become a translator, following which she took additional courses in psychotherapy. Accepted at the University of Applied Arts Vienna in 1998, Rabinowich continued her studies with a focus on Fine Arts (painting) and philosophy, receiving her diploma in 2006.

Since 2006, Rabinowich has worked as an interpreter for refugees at the Integrationshaus Wien and the Diakonie Flüchtlingsdienst. Both centres are engaged in welcoming, aiding and integrating asylum seekers, refugees and migrants to Austria.

Rabinowich is a regular columnist for Der Standard, contributing weekly columns under the title “Geschüttelt, nicht Gerührt” (Shaken, not Stirred) since March 2012, wherein she addresses current issues.

While Rabinowich thinks that art can but need not be political, much of her own work is written in response to the politics around asylum and the European refugee experience. Despite her frequent use of these themes, she rails against having her literary works categorized as “migration literature,” finding the term derogatory and “downright racist.”

In describing her relationship between her work as an artist and as an author, Rabinowich says, “I am a very visual person. I write what I see. I used to write with colours, now with words.”

In 2013, Rabinowich moderated an art installation at the Jewish Museum Vienna showcasing the works of her father, Boris Rabinowich. Rabinowich lives and works an author, dramatist and painter in Vienna.

== Literary works ==
In addition to her work as a dramatist and playwright, Rabinowich has written three novels. Her first, Spaltkopf, which draws heavily on her own life, tells the story of Mischka, a seven-year old Jewish émigré, born in Saint Petersburg who, together with her parents and grandmother, moves to Vienna. Mischka's story spans almost thirty years, with the story-telling shared by Spaltkopf (“Splithead”), a Russian fairy-tale monster who feeds off the emotions of his victims. Mischka relates the ordeals of the family's new life in Austria while Splithead discloses the family's past in Russia. Spaltkopf was awarded the prestigious 2009 Rauris Literature Prize. In 2011, Spaltkopf was translated by Tess Lewis from the German into English with the title Splithead. Splithead was nominated for the “International Impact Dublin Literary Award” in 2013.

Rabinowich's second novel, Herznovelle written in the first person, tells the story of a woman brought by her husband to hospital for heart surgery. The operation is a success, however, the woman is profoundly changed. She becomes obsessed with the surgeon who quite literally touched her heart. With psychological assistance she is able to let go of the infatuation and find her way back to her previous life. The title, Herznovelle, references Arthur Schnitzler's 1925 Traumnovelle.

Rabinowich's most current novel, Die Erdfresserin examines themes of origin, the past and European migration through the struggle of Diana who takes on the responsibilities of providing for the family she left behind, her disabled son, overbearing mother and bitter sister. A film director in her homeland, she finds herself working as a prostitute where she meets and nurses an ill policeman until his death. When she learns her son has been admitted to a clinic, she heads back home.

=== Theater Productions (commissioned works) ===
- 2007: Nach der Grenze, WUK, Wien
- 2008: Romeo + Julia, Schauspielhaus Wien
- 2008: Orpheus im Nestroyhof, Theater Nestroyhof Hamakom, Wien
- 2009: Fluchtarien. Monolog für drei Stimmen und eine Tastatur, Volkstheater, Wien
- 2010: Stück ohne Juden, Volkstheater, Vienna
- 2010: Auftauchen. Eine Bestandsaufnahme, Volkstheater, Wien
- 2014: Tagfinsternis Landestheater Niederösterreich

=== Novels ===
- Spaltkopf, Deuticke Verlag, Wien 2008, 202 pages, ISBN 978-3-552-06146-0
- Splithead, Portobello Books, London 2011 – translated from the German Spaltkopf into English by Tess Lewis – ISBN 978-1-84627-282-0
- Herznovelle, Deuticke Verlag, Wien 2011, 160 page, ISBN 978-3-552-06158-3
- Die Erdfresserin, Deuticke Verlag, Wien 2012, 235 pages, ISBN 978-3-552-06195-8
- Krötenliebe, Deuticke Verlag, München 2016, 192 pages, ISBN 978-3-552-06311-2
- Dazwischen: Ich, Carl Hanser Verlag, München 2016, 256 pages, ISBN 978-3-446-25306-3

=== Anthology Contributions ===
- Wortbrücken: Das Buch zum Literaturpreis 2003 Anthologie. Stippinger, Christa (Anthologist). edition exil, 2003. 232 pages. ISBN 978-3-901899-18-8
- Schreibrituale: Eine Anthologie. Wäger, Elisabeth and Horn, Batya (Anthologists). Edition Splitter, 2004. 144 pages. ISBN 978-3-901190-92-6
- Be-Sitzer, Bilderbuch für Erwachsene. Publikationsreihe Hofmobiliendepot, 2004.
- Angekommen: Texte nach Wien zugereister Autorinnen und Autoren. Dor, Milo (Anthologist). Picus, 2005. 200 pages. ISBN 978-3-85452-489-2
- Leidenschafften: Eine Anthologie. Horn, Batya and Baier, Christian (Anthologists). Edition Splitter, 2006. 144 pages. ISBN 978-3-901190-98-8
- Pedanten und Chaoten: Eine Anthologie. Horn, Batya (Anthologist). Edition Splitter, 2007. 144 pages. ISBN 978-3-901190-50-6
- Eisfischen: Das Beste aus dem MDR-Literaturwettbewerb. Hametner, Michael (Anthologist). Mitteldeutscher Verlag, 2007. 136 pages. ISBN 978-3-89812-447-8
- Wienzeilen: Die Interkulturelle Anthologie. Neimann, Fritz and Vasari, Eva (Anthologists) Bibliothek der Provinz, 2009. 136 pages. ISBN 978-3-85252-635-5
- Schlager & Treffer – Eine Anthologie. Baier, Christian (Anthologist). Edition Splitter, 2010. 176 pages. ISBN 978-3-901190-89-6
- Well, Come!: Literarische Portraits von jugendlichen Flüchtlingen und ihren PatInnen. Mandelbaum, 2011. 180 pages. ISBN 978-3-85476-371-0
- How I Loved Jamal. Warnung: Kann Spuren von Vögeln enthalten. Travnicek, Cornelia (Anthologist). Milena Vortrag, 2013. 220 pages. ISBN 978-3-85286-188-3
- Am Zug: Neue Texts übers Bahnfahren. Residenz Verlag, 2014. 192 pages. ISBN 978-3-7017-1638-8
- Höflichkeit heute zwischen Manieren, Korrektheit und Respekt (Wiener Vorlesungen). Picus Verlag, 2015. 64 pages. ISBN 978-3-85452-575-2
- Aspects of Growth. Knoechl, Birgit. Verlag für Moderne Kunst, 2015. 102 pages. ISBN 978-3-903004-59-7

=== Awards ===
- 2003 Literaturpreis “schreiben zwischen den Kulturen”
- 2004 Arbeitsstipendium der Stadt Wien
- 2006 Stipendium der Wiener Wortstätten
- 2009 Arbeitsstipendium des BKA
- 2009 MiA – award
- 2009 Rauris Literature Prize for Spaltkopf
- 2010 Elias-Canetti-Stipendium
- 2011 Shortlist Ingeborg-Bachmann-Preis
- 2012 Elias-Canetti-Stipendium
- 2014 Wiener Frauenpreis
