= Hartmut Steinecke =

German literature professor (1940–2020)

Hartmut Steinecke (12 March 1940 – 25 January 2020) was a German literary critic and university lecturer.

== Life ==
Born in Nürnberg, Steinecke studied history and philosophy at the Universität des Saarlandes and the University of Bonn, where he received his doctorate in 1966 with a thesis about Hermann Broch. From 1967 to 1973 he was a research assistant at the German Department of the University of Bonn, where he habilitated in 1973 with a thesis on Romantic theory and criticism in Germany. In 1974 he became professor of Modern German Literature at the University of Paderborn. He taught there until his retirement in 2005.

Between 1966 and 2008 he was repeatedly visiting professor at various North American universities, including Dartmouth College (1978), Cornell (1981), University of Kansas, Lawrence (1984), University of Michigan, Ann Arbor (1987), University of Budapest (1990), Washington University in St. Louis (1993), University of Graz (1994, 1998, 2003, 2007); Ohio State University, Columbus (2008).

In 1992 he founded the Jenny Aloni Archive in Paderborn. In 2002 Steinecke was accepted into the North Rhine-Westphalian Academy of Sciences, Humanities and the Arts. He was awarded the Austrian Decoration for Science and Art. He was awarded honorary doctorates from the University of Timișoara, Romania (2002) and the University of Graz (2005).

Hartmut died in Paderborn at the age of 79.

== Publications ==
=== Author ===
- Hermann Broch und der polyhistorische Roman. Studien zur Theorie und Technik eines Romantyps der Moderne. Bonn 1968 (Diss. Bonn 1966)
- Romantheorie und Romankritik in Deutschland. Die Entwicklung des Gattungsverständnisses von der Scott-Rezeption bis zum programmatischen Realismus. 2 vol.. Stuttgart 1975–1976. (Habilschr. Bonn 1973)
- Romanpoetik von Goethe bis Thomas Mann. Entwicklungen und Probleme der "demokratischen Kunstform" in Deutschland. Munich 1987. ISBN 3-7705-2436-5.
- Erfahrung und Erfindung. Interpretationen zum deutschen Roman vom Barock bis zur Moderne. Heidelberg 1992. ISBN 3-8253-4545-9.
- Unterhaltsamkeit und Artistik. Neue Schreibarten in der deutschen Literatur von Hoffmann bis Heine. Bielefeld 1998. ISBN 3-503-03795-0.
- Von Lenau bis Broch. Studien zur österreichischen Literatur – von außen betrachtet. Tübingen / Basel 2002. ISBN 3-7720-2886-1.
- Die Kunst der Fantasie. E.T.A. Hoffmanns Leben und Werk. Frankfurt am Main / Leipzig 2004. ISBN 3-458-17202-5.
- Literatur als Gedächtnis der Shoah. Deutschsprachige jüdische Schriftstellerinnen und Schriftsteller der "zweiten Generation". Schöningh, Paderborn 2005. ISBN 978-3-506-72946-0.
- Heinrich Heine im Dritten Reich und im Exil. Schöningh, Paderborn 2008. ISBN 978-3-506-76688-5
- "Das Gepräge des Außerordentlichen". Heinrich Heine liest E.T.A. Hoffmann. Erich Schmidt Verlag, Berlin 2015. ISBN 978-3-503-15556-9.
- "Um zu erleben, was Geschichte ist, muss man Jude sein". Jenni Aloni – eine deutsch-jüdische Schriftstellerin. Aisthesis, Bielefeld 2017. ISBN 978-3-8498-1227-0.
- Nachruf auf Walter Hinck in der Sitzung der Klasse für Geisteswissenschaften am 10. Februar 2016. In Jahrbuch Nordrhein-Westfälische Akademie der Wissenschaften (2017), p. 101–105 (online)

=== Editor ===
- Literaturkritik des Jungen Deutschland : Entwicklungen – Tendenzen – Texte. Berlin 1982. ISBN 3-503-01682-1.
- Jenny Aloni: Gesammelte Werke in Einzelausgaben. Vol 1–10. Paderborn 1990–1997.
- Heine und die Nachwelt. Geschichte seiner Wirkung in den deutschsprachigen Ländern. Vol. 1–3. Berlin 2006–2011.
