= Senthuran Varatharajah =

German writer of Tamil origin

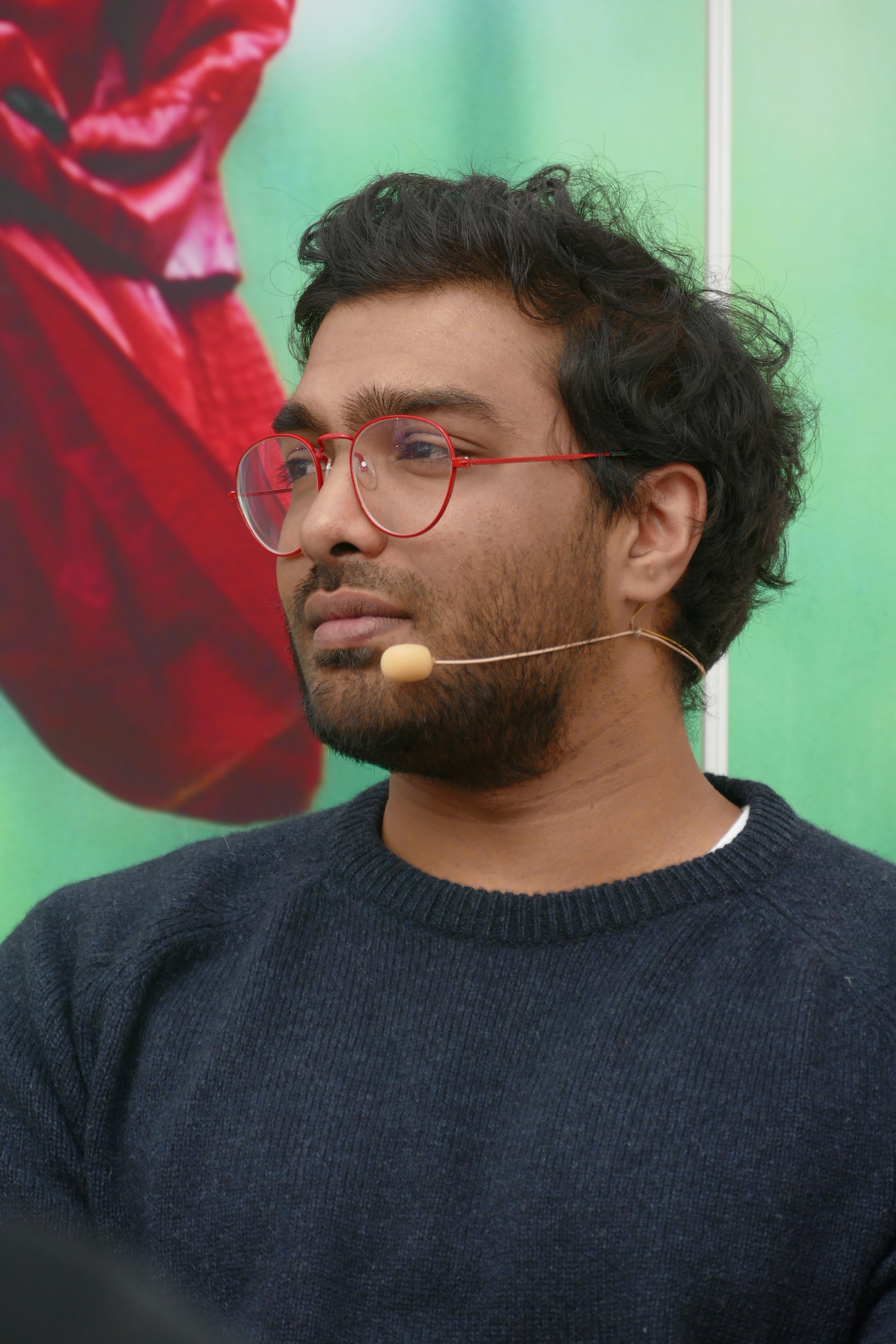
Picture of Senthuran Varatharajah

Senthuran Varatharajah is a German writer of Tamil origin. Born in Jaffna, he moved to Germany as a child. He studied in Marburg, Berlin and London. His debut novel Vor der Zunahme der Zeichen appeared in 2016 and won numerous prizes, among them the 3sat Prize, the Alfred Doblin Fellowship of the Berlin Academy of Arts, the Berlin Senate Fellowship, the Kranichsteiner Literaturförderpreis, the Bremer Literaturförderpreis, the Chamisso Award and the Rauris Literature Prize.
