= Ann Tizia Leitich =

- Born: 25 January 1896; Vienna, Austria
- Died: 3 September 1976 (aged 80); Vienna, Austria
- Occupations: Writer; journalist
- Parent(s): Emilie Schmidt; Albert Leitich
- Writing career
- Notable awards: Austrian Decoration for Science and Art

Ann Tizia Leitich (25 January 1896 – 3 September 1976) was an Austrian writer and journalist.

== Biography ==
Leitich was born on January 25, 1896, in Vienna, Austria, to parents Emilie Schmidt and Albert Leitich, the latter an author and professor. She attended university, and was educated to be a teacher on her parents' insistence. As a result of suffering a mental breakdown, Leitich emigrated to the United States in 1921. She was employed as a housemaid in Chicago and New York City, until receiving a job from the Neue Freie Presse. Her work, which centered on Austria and Germany, as well as American daily life was highly praised in Austria, with one critic writing "her name was signed under sparkling and witty articles on life across the ocean, under articles full of surprising nativeness." Popular in Germany as well, she took jobs with Deutsche Allgemeine Zeitung, Der Tag and the Berliner Lokalanzeiger. Her focus shifted around this time to put more emphasis on the changing role of women in society.

While she was most popular (from around 1923–1928), she also completed a degree in Des Moines, Iowa. In 1928, she moved to Vienna, and wrote over 25 books. She received the Honor Decoration in Silver by the City of Vienna and the Austrian Cross of Honor for Science and Art 1st Class. She died in Vienna on September 3, 1976.

== See also ==
- List of Austrian writers
