= Thomas Hettche =

German author (born 1964)

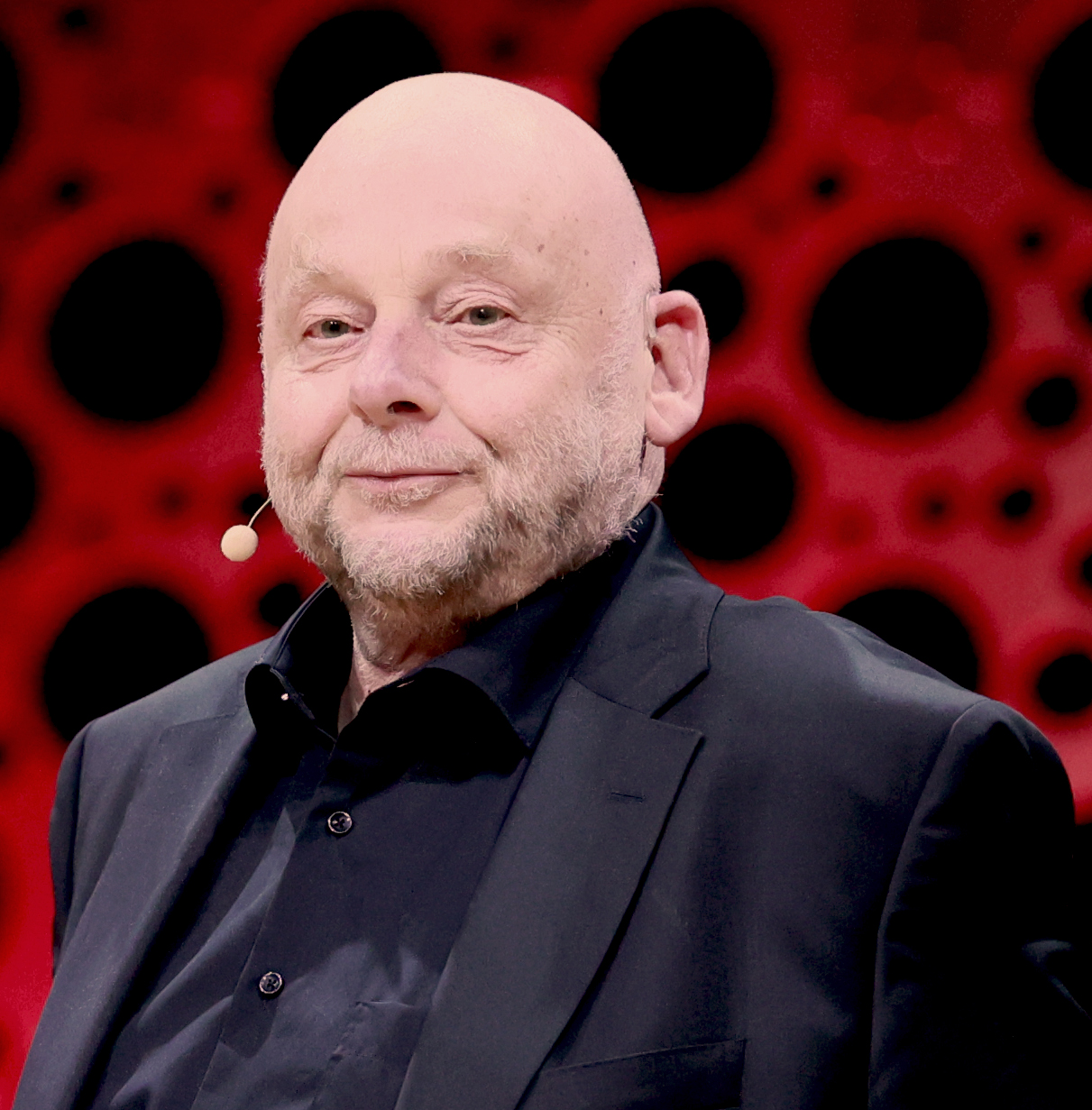
Thomas Hettche at the Frankfurt Book Fair 2023

Thomas Hettche (born 30 November 1964 in Treis, Hesse) is a German author.

Hettche completed his Abitur at the Liebigschule Giessen, He studied German studies and philosophy at the Johann Wolfgang Goethe University in Frankfurt am Main and completed his PhD in philosophy.

What We Are Made Of, an English translation by Shaun Whiteside of Hettche's novel Woraus wir gemacht sind (2006), was published by Picador in Britain in July 2008, and in the United States in October 2010. Since 2018, he has been honorary professor at the TU Berlin.

Hettche lives in Berlin.

== Awards ==
- 1990 Rauris Literature Prize
- 2014 Wilhelm Raabe Literature Prize
- 2015 Solothurner Literaturpreis
- 2018 Hermann-Hesse-Literaturpreis
- 2019 Joseph-Breitbach-Preis

=== Memberships ===
- 1999 PEN Centre Germany
- 2019 Academy of Arts, Berlin

== Bibliography ==
- Hettche, Thomas (1988). Ludwigs Tod. Frankfurt/Main: PARIA-Verlag. ISBN 3-922952-11-9. OCLC 28238643.
- —— (2002). Ludwig muss sterben : Roman (in German). Köln: DuMont. ISBN 3-8321-6012-4. OCLC 49380095.
- —— (1992). Inkubation. Frankfurt am Main: Suhrkamp. ISBN 3-518-40480-6. OCLC 54823512.
- —— (2004). Nox : Roman. Berlin: List Verlag. ISBN 3-548-60459-5. OCLC 66530355.
- —— (1997). Das Sehen gehört zu den glänzenden und farbigen Dingen (in German). Graz: Literaturverlag Droschl. ISBN 3-85420-455-8. OCLC 37487151.
- —— (2017). Der Fall Arbogast Kriminalroman (in German). Köln: Verlag Kiepenheuer & Witsch. ISBN 978-3-462-05032-5. OCLC 964393162.
- —— (2006). Woraus wir gemacht sind : Roman (in German). Köln: Kiepenheuer & Witsch. ISBN 3-462-03711-0. OCLC 71200253.
- —— (2007). Fahrtenbuch : 1993-2007 (in German). Köln: Kiepenheuer & Witsch. ISBN 978-3-462-03916-0. OCLC 173602837.

=== English translation ===
- Hettche, Thomas; Whiteside, Shaun (2008). What we are made of. London: Picador. ISBN 978-0-330-45207-6. OCLC 183915932.

=== Thesis ===
- Hettche, Thomas (1999). Animationen (in German). Köln: DuMont. ISBN 3-7701-4578-X. OCLC 42668956.
