= Martin R. Dean =

Swiss writer

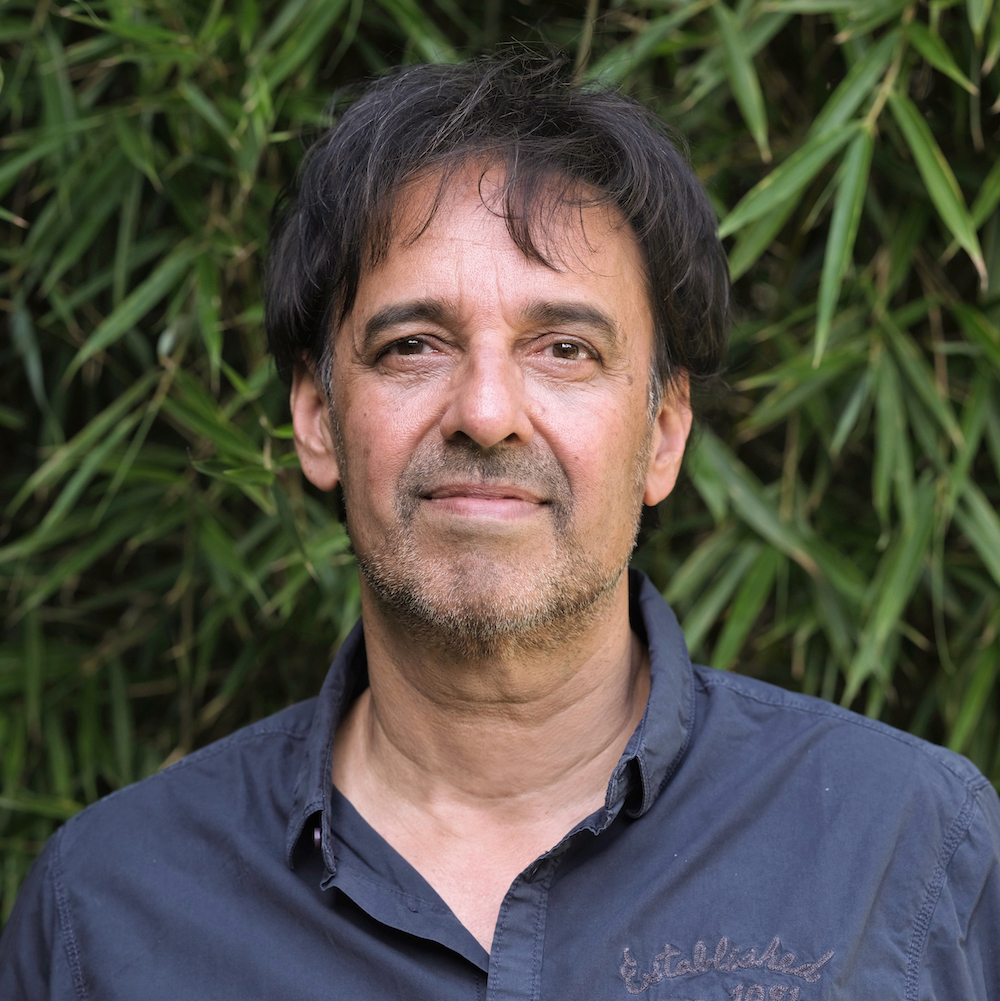
- Born: July 17, 1955 (age 71); Menziken/Aargau
- Occupation: Free writer/publicist

Martin R. Dean (born July 17, 1955 in Menziken/Aargau) is a Swiss writer.

== Life ==
Dean was born in Menziken to a Swiss mother and an Indian father from Trinidad. In 1976, he obtained his university entrance diploma at grammar school in Aarau. In 1977, he began studying German, philosophy, and ethnology at Universität Basel. In 1986, he finished his studies with a licentiate work about Hans Henny Jahnn’s novel "Perrudja", and graduated summa cum laude.

He traveled extensively and lived abroad for many years, in places such as South America, Portugal, France, Greece and Italy. From 1990 to 1998, he taught at the Schule für Gestaltung (School for Design) in Basel. In 1999, he started teaching German and philosophy at the grammar school in Muttenz. In 1995, he married a specialist in German studies, Dr. Silvia Henke, with whom he has a daughter.

Dean lives and works as a free writer and publicist in Basel.

== Awards ==
- 1983 Rauris Literature Prize for Die verborgenen Gärten
- 1988/89 Stipend at "Istituto Svizzero" in Rome
- 1994 Complete work prize of the Swiss Schiller Foundation
- 1997 Guest lecturer as "Poet in residence" at the “Gesamthochschule Essen”
- 2003 Single work price of the Swiss Schiller Foundation

== Works ==
- Die verborgenen Gärten, novel, 1982
- Die gefiederte Frau. Fünf Variationen über die Liebe, 1984
- Der Mann ohne Licht, novel, 1988
- Außer mir. Ein Journal, 1990
- Der Guayanaknoten, novel, 1994
- Die Ballade von Billie und Joe, novel, 1997
- Monsieur Fume oder Das Glück der Vergeßlichkeit, 1998
- Meine Väter, novel, 2003
- Zwischen Fichtenbaum und Palme. Kommentierte Textsammlung für den interkulturellen Deutschunterricht an Mittelschulen, 2005
