= List of Austrian writers =

This is a list of Austrian writers, including poets.

== A ==
- Ilse Aichinger (1921–2016), writer
- Peter Altenberg (1859–1910), writer and poet
- Jean Améry (1912–1978), writer
- Ernst Angel (1894–1986), writer, poet and psychologist
- Ludwig Anzengruber (1839–1889), writer
- H. C. Artmann (1921–2000), poet and writer

== B ==
- Ingeborg Bachmann (1926–1973), poet
- Hermann Bahr (1863–1934), playwright, novelist
- Christoph W. Bauer (1968– ), novelist
- Eduard von Bauernfeld (1802–1890), dramatist
- Konrad Bayer (1932–1964), writer and poet
- Johann Beer (17th century), writer and composer
- Thomas Bernhard (1931–1989), dramatist, novelist, poet, born in Cloister Heerlen, Netherlands
- Edmund Blum (1874–1938)
- Hermann Broch (1886–1951), writer
- Max Brod (1884–1968), born in Prague, Austria-Hungary, wrote in German

== C ==
- Elias Canetti (1905–1994), writer (born in Rustschuk, Bulgaria), wrote in German, Nobel Prize in Literature 1981
- Veza Canetti (1897–1963) poet, playwright, and short story writer
- Otto Maria Carpeaux (1900–1978), literary critic and foremost historian of Literature
- Paul Celan (1920–1970), poet (born in Czernowitz, Austria-Hungary), wrote in German
- Ada Christen (1839–1901), poet, short story writer, and writer of sketches

== D ==
- Robert Dassanowsky (1965–2023), Austrian-American poet
- Michael Denis (1729–1800), poet
- Heimito von Doderer (1896–1966), writer, born in Hadersdorf-Weidlingau near Vienna
- Milo Dor (1923–2005), Austrian writer of Serbian origin
- Albert Drach (1902–1995), novelist, playwright, memoirist

== E ==
- Klaus Ebner (born 1964), writer, born in Vienna
- Marie von Ebner-Eschenbach (1830–1916), writer (style: psychological novelist)
- Gustav Ernst (born 1944), playwright and novelist

== F ==
- Lilian Faschinger (born 1950), novelist, poet, and literary translator
- Franzobel (born 1967) (real name: Stefan Griebl), writer
- Sigmund Freud (1856–1939), philosopher, psychologist and founder of psychoanalysis
- Alfred Fried (1864–1921), writer, pacifist and Nobel Peace Prize winner in 1911
- Erich Fried (1921–1988), poet and novelist
- Egon Friedell (1878–1938), author, journalist and actor
- Marianne Fritz (1948–2007), writer and novelist

== G ==
- Karl-Markus Gauß (born 1954), essayist, Salzburg
- Karin Gayer (born 1969), writer, Mödling and Vienna
- Thomas Glavinic (born 1972), writer, Graz
- Heinrich Glücksmann (1864–1947), writer
- Constantin Göttfert (born 1979), writer
- Roland Gratzer (born 1983), writer and journalist, Vienna
- Franz Grillparzer (1791–1872), dramatist, Vienna

== H ==
- Wolf Haas (born 1960), writer best known for his Brenner novels
- Friedrich Halm (1806–1871)
- Robert Hamerling (1830–1889), poet
- Enrica von Handel-Mazzetti (1871-1955), novelist
- Peter Handke (born 1942), author, born in Griffen (Carinthia)
- Josef Haslinger (born 1955), writer
- Marlen Haushofer (1920–1970), writer
- Friedrich Heer (1916–1983), historian and writer, Vienna
- Ernst von Hesse-Wartegg (1851–1918), writer and traveller
- Fritz Hochwälder (1911–1986), playwright
- Hugo von Hofmannsthal (1874–1929), dramatist, writer
- Ödön von Horváth (1901–1938), writer, born in Fiume (today Rijeka), Austria-Hungary

== J ==
- Ernst Jandl (1925–2000), experimental lyric
- Elfriede Jelinek (born 1946), 2004 Nobel Prize in Literature

== K ==
- Eugenie Kain (1960–2010), writer, born in Linz, wrote in German
- Franz Kafka (1883–1924), writer, born in Prague, Austria-Hungary (wrote in German)
- Ernst Kein (1928-1985), writer, born in Vienna, wrote in German
- Marie-Thérèse Kerschbaumer (born 1936), novelist, poet
- Egon Erwin Kisch (1885–1948), writer, born in Prague, Austria-Hungary (wrote in German)
- Werner Kofler (1947–2011), novelist
- Ludwig von Köchel (1800–1877), writer, composer, botanist, music historian
- Karl Kraus (1874–1936), essayist, poet, dramatist
- Hertha Kräftner (1928–1951), essayist, poet and storyteller, born in Vienna, wrote in German
- Anton Kuh (1890–1941), writer and journalist

== L ==
- Minna Lachs (1907–1993), educator and memoirist
- Ann Tizia Leitich (1896–1976), writer and journalist
- Alexander Lernet-Holenia (1897–1976), novelist, poet, playwright
- Nikolaus Lenau (1802–1850), poet
- Cvetka Lipuš (born 1966), poet
- Mira Lobe (1913–1995), children's literature writer
- Konrad Lorenz (1903–1989)

== M ==
- Rosa Mayreder (1858–1938), writer and suffragette
- Friederike Mayröcker (1924–2021), contemporary writer
- Robert Menasse (born 1954), writer and publicist
- Gustav Meyrink (1868–1932), writer
- Anna Mitgutsch (born 1948), writer
- Frederic Morton (1924–2015), journalist and novelist
- Eligius Franz Joseph von Münch-Bellinghausen, known as Friedrich Halm (1806–1871), writer and dramatist
- Robert Musil (1880–1942), writer

== N ==
- Günther Nenning (1921–2006), journalist
- Johann Nestroy (1801–1862), playwright
- Christine Nöstlinger (1936–2018), writer (especially literature for children)

== O ==
- Andreas Okopenko (1930–2010), writer

== P ==
- Katharina Prato (1818–1897), cookbook writer
- Leo Perutz (1882–1957), writer
- Andreas P. Pittler (born 1964), writer
- Thomas Pollan (born 1971)
- Ursula Poznanski (born 1968), writer

== R ==
- Doron Rabinovici (born 1961), Israeli-Austrian writer, historian and essayist
- Ferdinand Raimund (1790–1836), writer and dramatist
- Christoph Ransmayr (born 1954), writer
- Elisabeth Reichert (born 1953), writer
- Neidhart von Reuental (c. 1190 – c. 1240), writer and poet 13th century
- Rainer Maria Rilke (1875–1926), poet and novelist
- Peter Rosegger (1843–1918), writer
- Joseph Roth (1894–1939), writer (Radetzkymarsch)

== S ==
- Ferdinand von Saar (1833–1906), dramatist and writer
- Leopold von Sacher-Masoch (1836–1895), writer and journalist
- Hamid Sadr (born 1946), author from Iran
- Felix Salten (1869–1945), Jewish writer (most famous work Bambi)
- Arthur Schnitzler (1862–1931), writer
- Barbara Schurz (born 1973), writer and painter
- Werner Schwab (1958–1994), playwright
- Erich Fritz Schweinburg (1890–1959), writer
- Robert Seethaler (born 1966), writer and actor
- Hans Werner Sokop (born 1942), poet and translator
- Jura Soyfer (1912–1933), cabaret writer and political journalist, lived in Vienna
- Manès Sperber (1905–1984), Austrian-French writer, philosopher and psychologist
- Fritz Spiegl (1926–2003), journalist
- Walter Johannes Stein (1891–1957), historian
- Rudolf Steiner (1861–1925), writer and philosopher
- Adalbert Stifter (1805–1868), poet and artist
- Bertha von Suttner (1843–1914), Nobel Peace Prize winner

== T ==
- Franziska Tausig (1895–1989), Holocaust survivor and memoirist
- Friedrich Torberg (1908–1979), narrative writer, essayist, script author, born in Vienna
- Georg Trakl (1887–1914), poet

== V ==
- Hannelore Valencak (1929–2004), novelist, poet, children's writer

== W ==
- Franz Werfel (1890–1945), writer, born in Prague, Austria-Hungary (wrote in German)
- Ludwig Wittgenstein (1889–1951), philosopher
- Alma Wittlin (1899–1992), historian
- Oswald von Wolkenstein (1376–1445), writer and composer

== Z ==
- Joseph Christian, Baron von Zedlitz (1790–1862), dramatist and poet
- Birgit Zotz (born 1979), writer and anthropologist
- Volker Zotz, writer and philosopher
- Stefan Zweig (1881–1942), writer, born in Vienna

== See also ==
- List of Austrian women writers
- List of Austrians
- Lists of authors
