= Teresa Präauer =

Austrian writer and visual artist

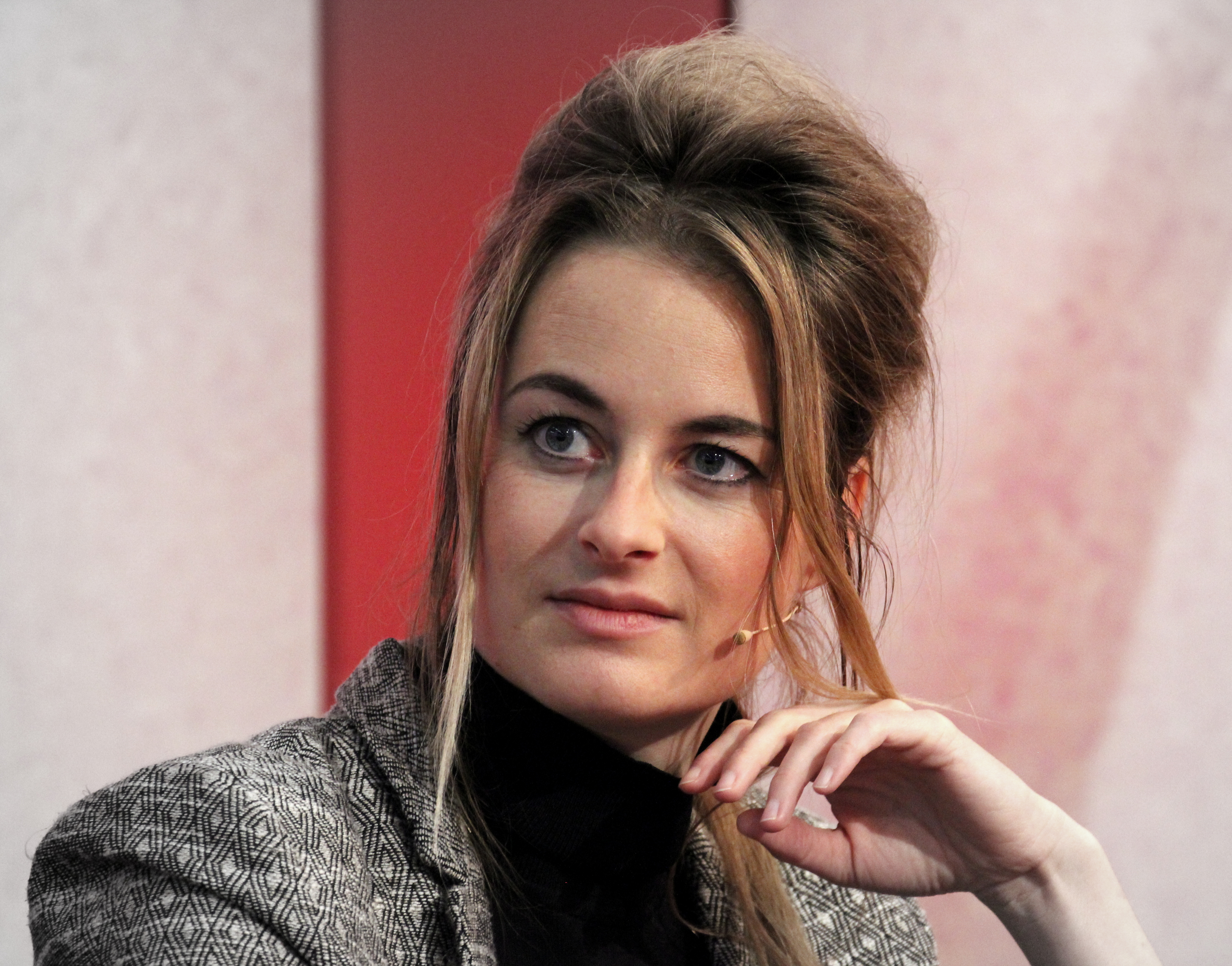
- Teresa Präauer, Frankfurt Book Fair 2016

Teresa Präauer (born 28 February 1979 in Linz, Oberösterreich) is an Austrian writer and visual artist.

== Life ==
Teresa Präauer was born in Linz and grew up in Graz and St. Johann im Pongau District. From 1997 to 2003 she studied German studies at the University of Salzburg and the Humboldt University of Berlin as well as painting at the Mozarteum Salzburg. From 2003 she lived and worked in Vienna, where she studied as a postgraduate at the Academy of Fine Arts Vienna from 2004 to 2005. [4] For her first novel titled, For the Ruler from Overseas, Präauer was awarded the aspects literature prize of ZDF for the best German-language prose debut. In 2015 she received the Friedrich-Hölderlin-Preis of the city of Bad Homburg[5] for Johnny and Jean and was nominated for the prize of the Leipzig Book Fair. Teresa Präauer was nominated for the Ingeborg Bachmann Prize at the Days of German Literature in 2015.

In the summer semester of 2016, Präauer held the Samuel Fischer Guest Professorship for Literature at the Free University of Berlin and gave a seminar on Poetic Ornithology. On aviation in literature. On 25 May 2016 she gave the inaugural lecture entitled Animal Will. In 2017, she held the Mainz Poetry Lecture and was invited to the German Department of Grinnell College in the state of Iowa, as a writer in residence and visiting professor.

== Career ==
In addition to her work as a writer, Teresa Präauer also works as a visual artist. Her literary and pictorial works are closely related. For both areas, she develops "actually two very similar ways of thinking". In her first published work, she combined drawings with poetic short texts. In 2010 she illustrated the picture book The Contrary Goose by Wolf Haas. The birds, flying and crashing are also addressed in For the Ruler from Overseas:Roman. The book tells the story of two children who spend the summer with their grandfather.

In her second novel Johnny und Jean, an artist's novel for which, as with all her books, she designed the cover. Präauer as author leads the reader into the milieu of a contemporary art scene at an art academy, in which younger and old masters of art history are quoted and the artist Johnny even comes into conversation with the artists in his imagination, such as Salvador Dalí and Marcel Duchamp.

From 2015 she started to write for the literary magazine Volltext about video viewing on the Internet. Between 2015 and 2017 wrote the literary column Stuff & Pieces, for the theater feature section of the Editorial Night Review or Redaktion nachtkritik. She also writes regularly for Die Zeit online magazine in the culture section. Since 2018 she has been a regular guest author for the Salzburger Nachrichten.

Some of her artistic works can be seen permanently, such as a book sculpture in the Museum of Applied Arts, Vienna, a painting in the Artothek of the Federal Government.

In May 2018, her drama Ein Hund namens Dollar premiered at the Schauspiel Frankfurt. Since November 2018, a dramatized version of her novel Oh Schimmi has been shown at the Schauspielhaus in Vienna.

== Bibliography ==
=== Books ===
==== As author ====
- Präauer, Teresa (2014). Taubenbriefe von Stummen an anderer Vögel Küken (in German) (1st ed.). Vienna: Krill. ISBN 978-3-9502537-1-9. OCLC 1061274059.
- Präauer, Teresa (2012). Für den Herrscher aus Übersee : Roman (in German). Göttingen: Wallstein Verlag. ISBN 978-3-8353-1092-6. OCLC 1066106127.
- Präauer, Teresa (2015). Johnny und Jean : Roman (in German) (2nd ed.). Gottigen: Wallstein. ISBN 978-3-8353-1556-3. OCLC 903705848.
- Präauer, Teresa (2016). Oh Schimmi : Roman (in German) (1st ed.). Göttingen: Wallstein. ISBN 978-3-8353-1873-1. OCLC 997448745.
- Präauer, Teresa (2023). Kochen im falschen Jahrhundert (in German). Göttingen: Wallstein. ISBN 978-3-8353-5429-6.

==== As illustrator ====
- Haas, Wolf; Präauer, Teresa (2010). Die Gans im Gegenteil (in German). Hamburg: Hoffmann und Campe. ISBN 978-3-455-40286-5. OCLC 967962254.

=== Articles and papers ===
A selection of Präauer's papers and articles.

- Landesgalerie am Oberösterreichisches Landesmuseum (Linz) (2004). Im Schloss 2004 : Carla Ählander, Johann Jascha, Constantin Luser, Klaus Mosettig, Gerhard Müllner, Teresa Präauer; [dieses Katalogbuch dokumentiert das Symposion auf Schloss Sigharting vom 27. Juni bis 18. Juli 2004] [Landesgalerie Linz at the Upper Austrian State Museum] (in German). Weitra: Publ. P No 1, Bibliothek der Provinz. ISBN 3-902414-19-7. OCLC 501387388.
- Wild dogs, catalog text, Kirchberg bei Mattighofen 2011
- Animals come, 50 drawings for the magazine Quart, Innsbruck 2014
- Präauer streams, Literary column in the literary magazine Volltext. Ongoing since 2015.
- Präauer, Teresa; Balmes, Hans Jürgen (2017). Poetische Ornithologie. Neue Rundschau, 128,1. Frankfurt: S. Fischer Verlag GmbH. ISBN 978-3-10-809109-5. OCLC 979540329.
- Thun-Hohenstein, Christoph; Pokorny-Nagel, Katrin; Rossberg, Anne-Katrin; Präauer, Teresa; Schmidt, Frieder; Schwahn-Reichmann, Raja; Doosry, Yasmin; Pokorny-Nagel, Kathrin (2017). Ephemera: die Gebrauchsgrafik der MAK-Bibliothek und Kunstblättersammlung = the graphic design of the MAK library and works on paper collection. MAK - Österreichisches Museum für Angewandte Kunst / Gegenwartskunst.; MAK studies (in German). Vienna: Verlag für Moderne Kunst. ISBN 978-3-903131-94-1. OCLC 974987164.
- Image of an exhibition - The art column by Teresa Präauer. 10 episodes on ORF radio Ö1, 2019

== Exhibitions ==
The following is a selection of the most notable solo and group based exhibitions that Präauer held.

=== Solo exhibitions ===
- 2003: Lolita, Mischa, Malina, Old fire station, Dresden
- 2004: The Lid does not stand in the way, Galerie 5020, Salzburg
- 2006: Unumkleidable, Art office, Düsseldorf
- 2007–2008: Eye slits for the stareless, International Research Centre for Cultural Studies, Vienna
- 2010: Pigeon Letters, Ortner 2, Vienna
- 2012: Like maybe, a hand, Kubin-House Schloss Zwickledt
- 2016: STARS, Lentos Kunstmuseum Linz

=== Group exhibitions ===
- 2017/18: Stars – Cosmic Art from 1900 to today, Lentos Kunstmuseum Linz
- 2016/17: MIXED EMOTIONS. CLASS ART V, Landesgalerie Linz
- 2016/17: pencil, notebook & laptop. 10 positions of current writing, literature museum at the Austrian National Library
- 2019/20: NONE | Fear of fear, Literaturhaus Wien

=== Works in public collections ===
- Artothek des Bundes, Vienna
- Museum of Applied Arts, Vienna
- Österreichische Galerie Belvedere Research Centre, Ursula Blickle video archive

== Awards and honours ==
The following is a selection of the most notable awards and honours that Präauer has received.

- 2006 Talent Promotion Award for Fine Arts of the Province of Upper Austria
- 2010 In October, Toad of the Month Children's Book Award for the picture book The contrary Goose with Wolf Haas
- 2012 Aspekte-Literaturpreis For the ruler from overseas
- 2015 Nomination for the Leipzig Book Fair Prize for Johnny and Jean
- 2015 Nomination for the Ingeborg Bachmann Prize
- 2015 Droste Prize of the City of Meersburg
- 2015 Award for the Friedrich-Hölderlin-Preis of the City of Bad Homburg
- 2015 Honorary Fellow in Writing at the University of Iowa, USA
- 2017 Erich Fried Prize
- 2017 Buchpreis der Salzburger Wirtschaft
- 2017 Nomination for the Franz Hessel Prize with Oh Schimmi
- 2022 Ben Witter Prize
