= Andreas P. Pittler =

Austrian writer

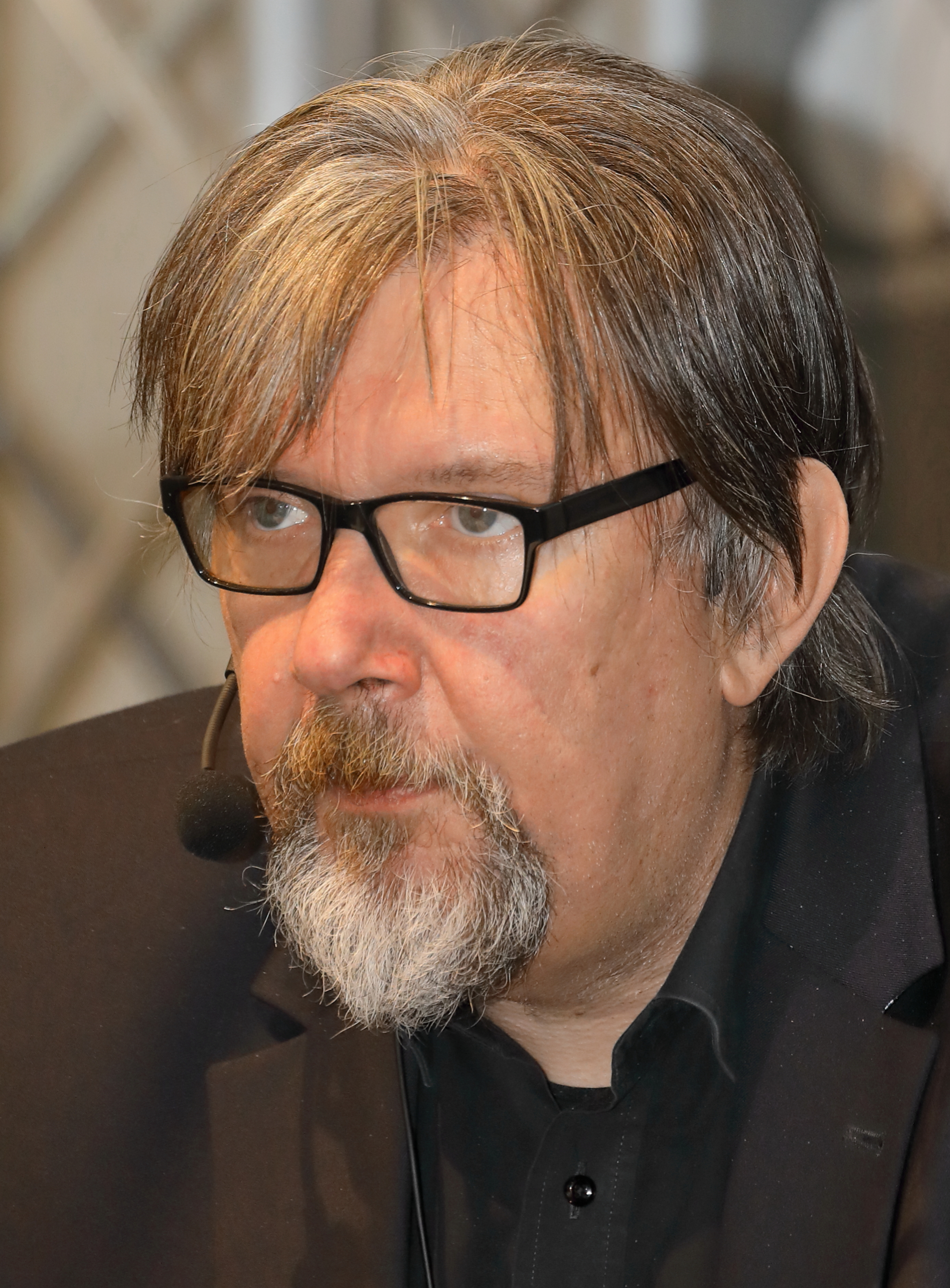
Andreas P. Pittler (2019)

Andreas P. Pittler (born 21 November 1964 in Vienna) is an Austrian writer.

After his school years Pittler studied history and political science in Vienna and received an M.A. and a Ph.D. degree. After some years working as a historian he became a journalist. Today he works as a civil servant in the Parliament of Austria.

Since 1985 he has published 28 books, mostly nonfiction. These include biographies on Bruno Kreisky, Monty Python, Rowan Atkinson and Samuel Beckett He has also published books on the history of Cyprus, Malta and the Czech Republic.

In 2000 his first novel "Der Sommer der großen Erwartungen" (The Summer of Great Expectations) appeared, a coming-of-age novel dealing with the problems of adolescence and first love. Later Pittler focused on crime novels and created the private investigator Henry Drake. Drake appears in the novels "Der Sündenbock" (The Scapegoat, 2000), "Tod im Schnee" (Death in the Snow, 2002), "Serbische Bohnen" (Serbian Beans, 2003) and "Das Dokument" (The Document, 2006).

In spring 2008 his sixth novel "Tacheles" (Plain talking) was published, where for the first time police-officer David Bronstein has to investigate. The story is set in Austria in 1934, and Bronstein, although considering himself as not religious, is constantly confronted with his Jewish background. In March 2009 Bronstein is again the main character in Pittler's seventh novel "Ezzes" (Good Advice). In March 2010 Bronstein reappeared in Pittler´s 8th novel "Chuzpe" (Impudence). In March 2011 the fourth Bronstein-novel "Tinnef" (Trumpery) was published, for which he was nominated for the "Friedrich Glauser-Prize" for crime novels. In March 2012 appeared the fifth Bronstein-novel "Zores" (Troubles), which will be published in an English translation in spring 2013.

Currently Pittler is working on the novel "Der göttliche Plan" (The Divine Plan).

Apart from his novels Pittler also wrote short stories, poems and essays. His works are translated into Slovenian, Serbocroatian, Ukrainian and English. Pittler is married and lives in Vienna.

== See also ==
- List of Austrian writers
