= Katja Oskamp =

German writer

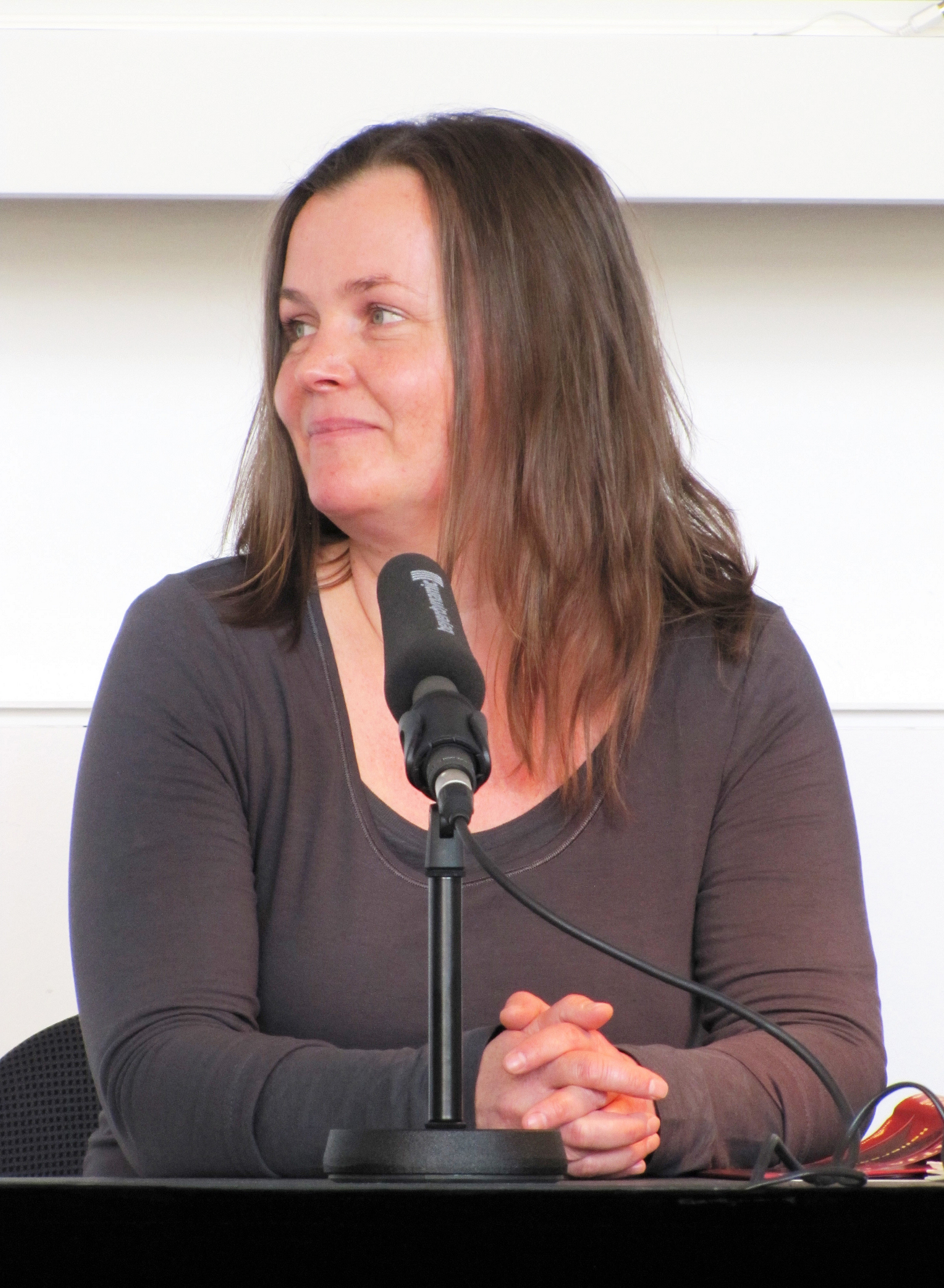
- Born: 20 February 1970 (age 56); Leipzig, East Germany
- Education: Theaterhochschule Leipzig; German Institute for Literature
- Occupation: writer
- Writing career
- Notable awards: Rauris Literature Prize (2004); Anna Seghers Prize (2007); Dublin Literary Award (2023)

Katja Oskamp (born 20 February 1970 in Leipzig) is a German writer. She won the 2023 Dublin Literary Award.

== Personal life and education ==
Oskamp was born 20 February 1970 in Leipzig, Germany and grew up in Berlin. She studied theatre at the Theaterhochschule Leipzig (1989–1991) and literature at the German Institute for Literature (1999–2002).

Oskamp lives in Berlin.

== Career ==
Oskamp began her career working as a playwright at the Volkstheater Rostock.

In 2000, she won her first literary prize for a short story called Rolf und Mucki und so weiter. Three years later, she debuted a short story collection called Halbschwimmer about childhood and youth in East Germany, which won the Rauris Literature Prize. In 2007, she published her first novel, Die Staubfängerin, which won her the Anna Seghers Prize.

In 2019, Oskamp published Marzahn, Mon Amour, a novel about the elderly citizens of Berlin, based on the author's own observations as a practising chiropodist in the Marzahn district, after deciding to change her career. It was her first work to be translated into English. The translation by Jo Heinrich won the 2023 International Dublin Literary Award.

== Awards ==
Awards for Oskamp's writing
Year	Title	Award	Result	Ref.
2004	Halbschwimmer	Rauris Literature Prize	Winner	
2007	Die Staubfängerin	Anna Seghers Prize	Winner	
2023	Marzahn, Mon Amour	Dublin Literary Award	Winner	

== Works ==
- Oskamp, Katja (2005). Halbschwimmer (in German). Berlin: Berliner Taschenbuch-Verl. ISBN 978-3-8333-0148-3.
- —— (2007). Die Staubfängerin (in German). Zürich: Ammann. ISBN 978-3-250-60111-1.
- —— (2010). Hellersdorfer Perle (in German). Frankfurt am Main: Eichborn. ISBN 978-3-8218-6110-4.
- —— (2019). Marzahn, mon amour (in German). Berlin: Hanser Berlin. ISBN 978-3-446-26414-4.
- —— (2024). Die vorletzte Frau (in German). Berlin: Park x Ullstein. ISBN 978-3-98816-020-1.
