= Hannelore Valencak =

Hannelore Valencak (23 January 1929 – 9 April 2004) was an Austrian physicist, novelist, poet and children's writer.

== Biography ==
Born in Leoben, Styria, Valencak studied physics at Graz University, graduating in 1955. She then worked as a metalurigist for Felten und Guilleaume in Kapfenberg. Her first husband, Oskar Kofler, died in a road accident in 1959. In 1962, she married Viktor Mayer and moved to Vienna, where she worked as a patent expert. From 1975, she devoted herself entirely to her writing.

Valencak first started to publish her work in 1951, initially in poetry and literary journals. Her most fruitful period of writing was from 1961 to 1981 when she published her first and last novels. In later life she withdrew from public attention with the result that her works were largely forgotten when she died in 2004. Interest was however revived in 2006 when her third novel Zuflucht hinter der Zeit was republished as Das Fenster zum Sommer (The Window to Summer) attracting considerable acclaim.

== Selected works ==
Among Valencak's many publications are the following:

- 1961: Morgen werden wir es wissen, short stories
- 1961: Die Höhlen Noahs, novel
- 1964: Ein fremder Garten novel
- 1966: Nur dieses eine Leben, poetry
- 1967: Zuflucht hinter der Zeit novel (republished as Das Fenster zum Sommer, 2006)
- 1970: Montag früh ist nicht das Leben, for children
- 1972: Vorhof der Wirklichkeit, novel
- 1974: Icb bin Barbara, for children, translated into English as When Half-Gods Go (1976)
- 1975: Meine schwererziehbare Tante, youth novel
- 1976: Regenzauber, youth novel, translated into English as A Tangled Web (1978)
- 1978: Das Treueversprechen, youth novel
- 1981: Das magische Tagebuch novel
- 1983: Mein Tag - mein Jahr, poetry, written jointly with Doris Mühringer
- 1898: Bettina und das eiserne Versprechen, youth novel
- 2008: Ausgewählte Gedichte, poetry collection

== See also ==
- List of Austrian writers
