= Rauris Literature Prize =

Austrian literary award

The Rauris Literature Prize (Rauriser Literaturpreis) is an annual Austrian literary award since 1972 by the Salzburg state government. The prize money is €10,000. It is awarded "for the best prose first publication by a German-speaking author from the previous year". The prize is presented at the opening of the Rauris Literature Days.

== Recipients ==
- 1972 Bodo Hell
- 1973 Gerhard Amanshauser and Peter Rosei
- 1974 Karin Struck
- 1975 Franz Innerhofer
- 1976 Peter Henisch (Special prize, no debut)
- 1977 Hans Joachim Schädlich
- 1978 Claudia Storz
- 1979 Werner Herzog
- 1980 Klaus Hoffer
- 1981 not awarded
- 1982 Thomas Hürlimann
- 1983 Michael Köhlmeier and Martin R. Dean
- 1984 Erwin Einzinger and Alain Claude Sulzer
- 1985 Herta Müller and Helen Meier
- 1986 Christa Moog and Eva Schmidt
- 1987 Gisela Corleis
- 1988 Werner Fritsch
- 1989 Norbert Gstrein
- 1990 Thomas Hettche
- 1991 Judith Kuckart
- 1992 Patrick Roth and Sabine Scholl
- 1993 Ruth Klüger
- 1994 Thomas Lehr
- 1995 Klaus Händl
- 1996 Raoul Schrott
- 1997 Felicitas Hoppe and Katrin Seebacher
- 1998 Bettina Galvagni
- 1999 Peter Stamm
- 2000 Gerhard Kelling
- 2001 Corinna Soria
- 2002 Juli Zeh
- 2003 Katharina Faber
- 2004 Katja Oskamp
- 2005 Christine Pitzke
- 2006 Kristof Magnusson
- 2007 Steffen Popp
- 2008 Simona Ryser
- 2009 Julya Rabinowich
- 2010 Thomas Klupp
- 2011 Dorothee Elmiger
- 2012 Maja Haderlap
- 2013 Matthias Senkel
- 2014 Saskia Hennig von Lange
- 2015 Karen Köhler
- 2016 Hanna Sukare
- 2017 Senthuran Varatharajah
- 2018 Raphaela Edelbauer
- 2019 Philipp Weiss
- 2020 Angela Lehner
- 2021 Benjamin Quaderer
- 2022 Anna Albinus
- 2023 Marcus Fischer
- 2024 Matthias Gruber
- 2025 Lilli Polansky
- 2026 Sophie Hunger
