= Karin Gayer =

Austrian writer (born 1969)

- Born: 1969 (age 56–57); Mödling, Austria
- Occupation: Writer
- Writing career
- Period: Contemporary

Karin Gayer (born 1969 in Mödling near Vienna) is an Austrian writer. She published poetry and narrative fiction.

== Biography ==
Karin Gayer was born 1969 in Mödling while she is living today in Vienna. She began to study psychology but interrupted and ended her studies because she “didn´t want to think in templates any longer”. She is an educated publishing assistant and a free lector. Karin Gayer began to write literature at school. She published in Austrian and German literary magazines, in anthologies and on the radio. Her first book made its appearance in 2002 and was published by Arovell Verlag. Her figures often are outsiders, who question the conventional ones. Her themes revolve around self and foreign knowledge between melancholy and subtle irony.

== Publications ==
- Flechtwerk, poetry and small prose, Arovell Verlag, Gosau 2002, ISBN 3-901435-46-8
- Vorgänge im Labyrinth, poetry and prose (with 3 co-authors) Arovell Verlag, Gosau 2004, ISBN 3-901435-66-2
- Nachtfieber, novel, Arovell Verlag, Gosau 2009, ISBN 978-3902547-84-2
- Innenaußenwelten, poetry, Edition Art Science, St. Wolfgang 2013, ISBN 978-3-902864-19-2
- Separation, stories, Arovell Verlag, Vienna/Gosau 2019, ISBN 978-3-903189-29-4
- Übergangsland, poetry, Edition sonne & mond, Vienna 2023, ISBN 978-3-903492-05-9

== See also ==
- List of Austrian writers
