= Peter Marginter =

Austrian translators and writer

Peter Marginter (26 October 1934 in Vienna – 10 February 2008 there) was an Austrian writer, including essayist and translator.

== Education ==
Marginter studied law and political science in Innsbruck and Vienna.

== Works ==
- Der Baron und die Fische, 1966
- Der tote Onkel, 1967, 1981 filmed by Georg Lhotsky
- Leichenschmaus, 1969
- Der Sammlersammler, 1971
- Königrufen, 1973
- Pim, 1973
- Wolkenreiter und Sohn, 1977
- Zu den schönen Aussichten, 1978
- Die drei Botschafter, 1980
- Wolkenreiter & Sohn, 1982, Drehbuch, filmed by Sepp Strubel
- Das Rettungslos, 1983, filmed by Georg Madeja and Peter Bongartz, Christine Ostermayer, Wilfried Baasner
- Die göttliche Rosl
- Der Kopfstand des Antipoden, 1985
- Besuch, 1987
- Die Maschine, 2000
- Das Röhren der Hirsche, 2001
- Des Kaisers neue Maus, 2001

== Honours and awards ==
- 1967: Literature Promotion Prize of Theodor Körner Foundation Fund for the Promotion of Science and Art
- 1968: Prize of the city of Vienna for literature
- 1968: Funding contribution of the Vienna Art Fund of the Central Savings Bank in Vienna for literature
- 1970: Anton Wildgans Prize
- 1973: Merit Award of Lower Austria for literature
- 1985: Price of the Inklings Society of Literature and Aesthetics
- 1986: Translators premium of the Federal Ministry of Education and Arts
- 1996: Austrian Cross of Honour for Science and Art, 1st class
