= Olga Flor =

Austrian writer

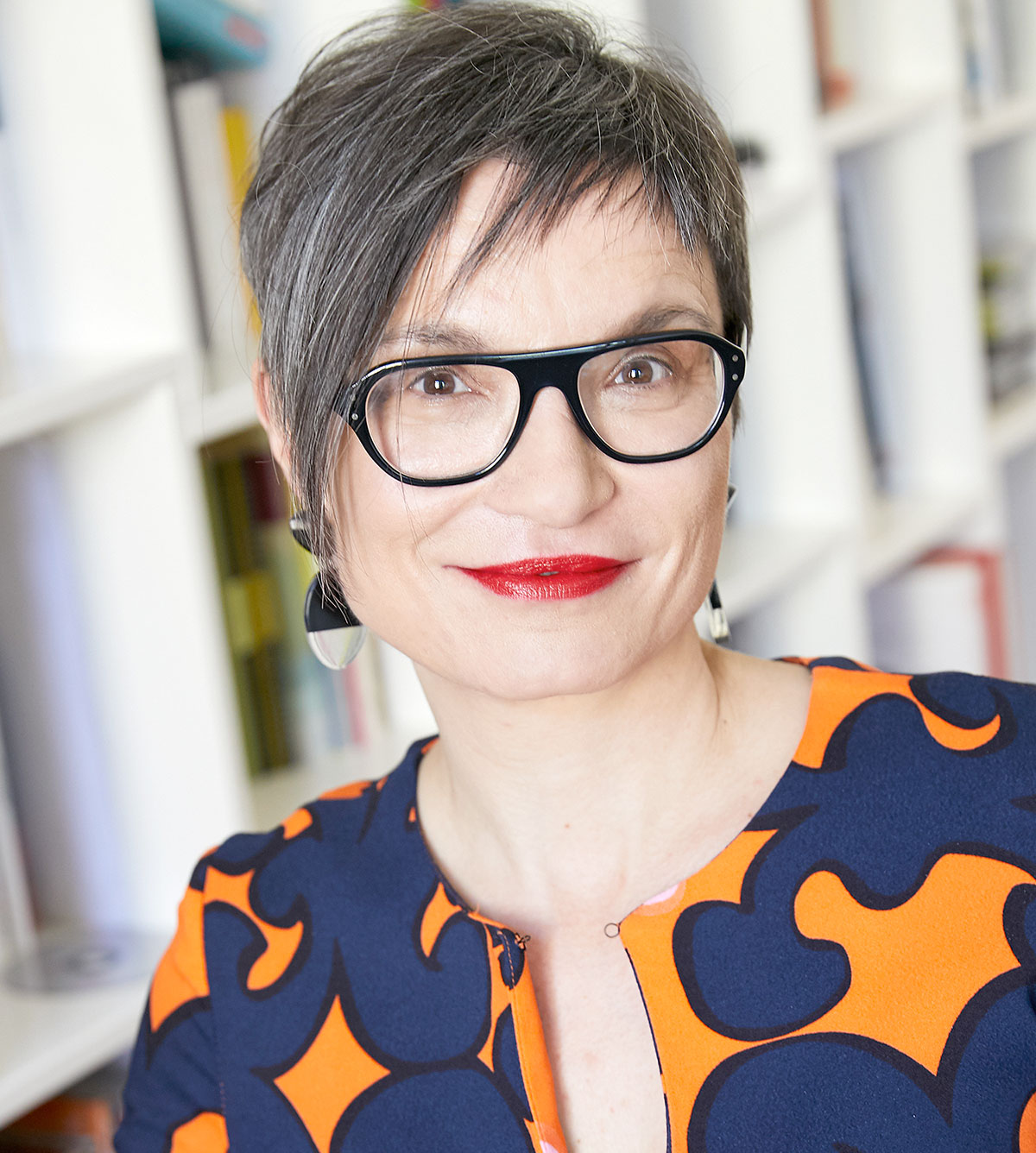
Olga Flor

Olga Flor (born 1968) is an Austrian writer.

== Life ==
Flor was born in Vienna. She grew up in Vienna, Cologne and Graz and completed her Matura at Akademisches Gymnasium Graz. Flor studied physics and history at the University of Graz. From 1997 to 1999, Flor stayed in Modena. The monologue Fleischgerichte premiered in 2004 at the Graz theater. She has worked for multimedia enterprises, written several books and received literary awards like the Anton Wildgans Prize in 2013.

She's a member of the Grazer Autorenversammlung.

== Awards ==
- 2013 Anton Wildgans Prize
- 2018 Droste Prize
- 2019 Franz Nabl Prize, Graz

== Works ==
- Flor, Olga (2002). Erlkönig : Roman in 64 Bildern (in German). [Graz]: Steirische Verlagsgesellschaft. ISBN 3-85489-066-4. OCLC 50871418.
- —— (2005). Talschluss : Roman (in German). Wien: P. Zsolnay. ISBN 3-552-05332-8. OCLC 57730044.
- —— (2008). Kollateralschaden : Roman (in German). Wien: Zsolnay. ISBN 978-3-552-05440-0. OCLC 237882435.
- —— (2012). Die Königin ist tot Roman (in German). Wien: Zsolnay. ISBN 978-3-552-05578-0. OCLC 809326759.
- —— (2015). Ich in Gelb : Roman. Salzburg: Jung und Jung. ISBN 978-3-99027-067-7. OCLC 904540928.
- —— (2017). Klartraum Roman (in German). Salzburg: Jung und Jung. ISBN 978-3-99027-096-7. OCLC 985976288.
- —— (2018). Politik der Emotion (in German). Wien: Residenz Verlag. ISBN 978-3-7017-3423-8. OCLC 985981218.
- —— (2020). Morituri : Roman (in German). Salzburg: Jung und Jung. ISBN 978-3-99027-246-6. OCLC 1245786862.

== Further readiung ==
- Weilandt, Sophie; Pfoser, Paula; Hötschl, Mario; Kurzweil, Yannick (3 October 2022). "Archive des Schreibens: Olga Flor: Kühle Ironie gegen den Zeitgeist". news.ORF.at (in German).
