= Thomas Pollan =

German and English language author (born 1971)

Thomas Pollan (born 1971) is a German and English language author.

He graduated from the University of Vienna, Austria, the Europa-Kolleg Hamburg, Germany, New York University and Harvard University. Since the year 2000 he has occupied various positions at the United Nations. In 2011 he published his first German language thriller "Die Strafe Gottes" with the Swiss Publisher Salis Verlag. Until then Pollan has largely been perceived as an author of books and articles on foreign affairs and economic policies. From 2005 to 2009 he functioned as one of the authors of the World Investment Report, the flagship publication of the United Nations Conference on Trade and Development. Pollan is the speaker of "NEOS X - The 10th State", a party division of NEOS – The New Austria catering to Austrians Abroad.

== Bibliography ==
=== Fiction ===
- Die Strafe Gottes. Thriller. Salis Verlag, Zürich 2011, ISBN 978-3-905801-43-9

=== Non-fiction ===
- Legal Framework for the Admission of FDI. Eleven International Publishing, Den Haag 2006, ISBN 978-90-77596-15-9.
- Globalization of R&D and developing countries. UNCTAD, Geneva 2005 (Fredriksson, Kalotay, Pollan eds.), ISBN 92-1-112694-0
- European Interests: A 2020 Vision of the Union's Foreign and Security Policy. Nomos 2004, ISBN 978-3-8329-1105-8 (in cooperation with Guido Houben)

== See also ==
- List of Austrian writers
