= Peter Rosei =

Austrian literary writer (born 1946)

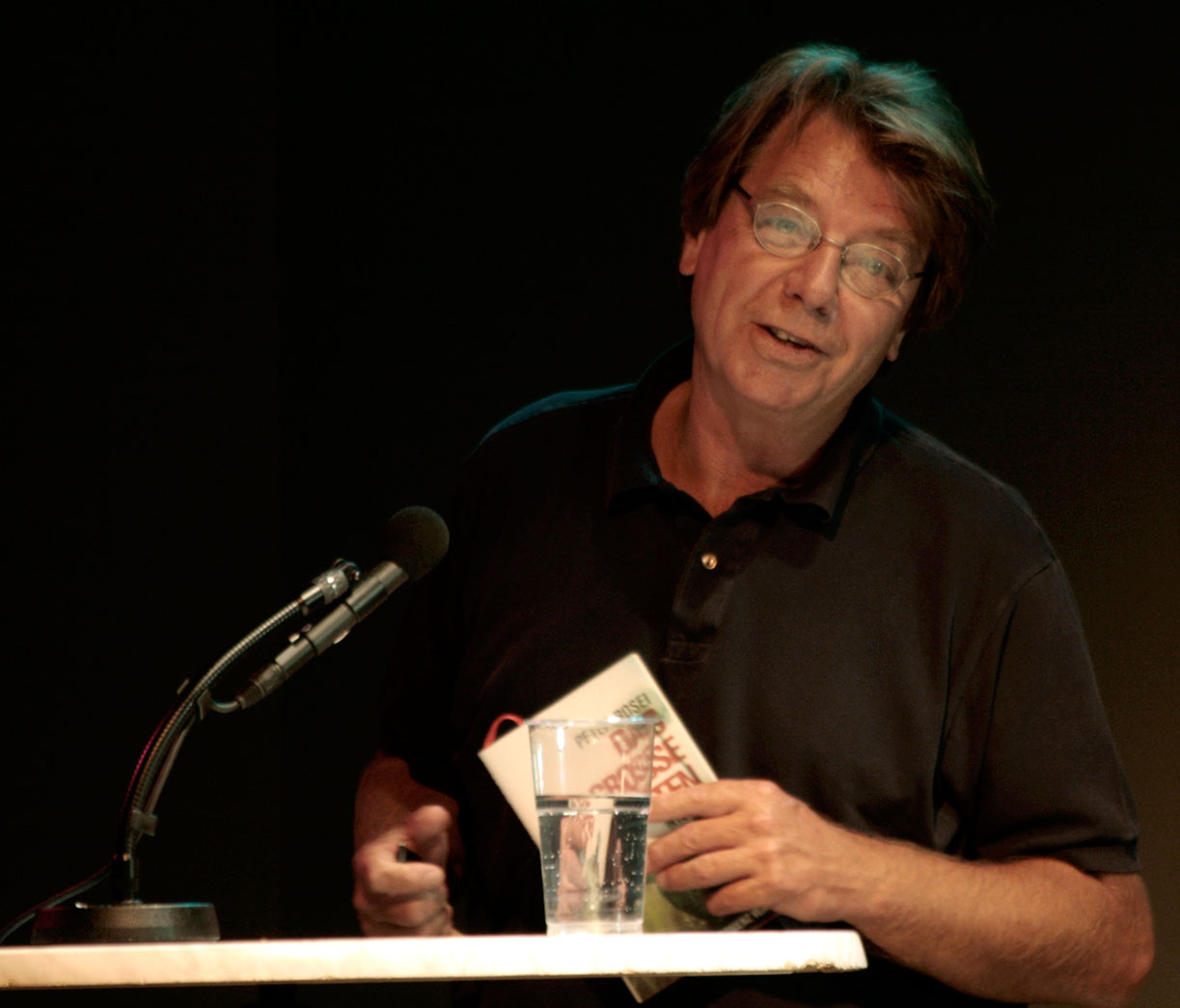
Peter Rosei.

Peter Rosei (born in Vienna on 17 June 1946) is an Austrian literary writer.

Rosei attended the University of Vienna, where he earned a doctorate in law in 1968. He worked for a time as the personal assistant to the Viennese painter Ernst Fuchs and then as the director of a publishing house for textbooks and nonfiction.

Since 1972, he has been a freelance writer, publishing novels, stories, essays, poetry, plays, travelogues, and children's literature. He has traveled extensively and intensively throughout the world and has been a guest writer at Oberlin College, Bowling Green State University, and the University of New Mexico at Taos, as well as guest professor at the University of Nagoya, Japan.

His literary breakthrough came with the novel Wer war Edgar Allan (Who was Edgar Allan) in 1977, which was filmed in 1984 by the Austrian director Michael Haneke, with a screenplay by Rosei. His fictional texts portray the limits of knowledge and the discrepancies between thought and action in Western society. Rosei's prolific output includes the novels Die Milchstraße (The Milky Way, 1981), Rebus (1990), and Persona (1995), as well as a six-part novel cycle titled Das 15 000-Seelen-Projekt (The 15,000 Souls Project) from 1984–1988. In 2005, he published a panoramic novel of Vienna during the postwar period, Wien Metropolis (Metropolis Vienna).

Works that have been translated into English include Von hier nach dort (1978) (From Here to There, translated by Kathleen Thorpe, 1991), Das schnelle Glück (1980) (Try Your Luck, translated by Kathleen Thorpe, 1994), and Ruthless and Other Writings (translated by Geoffrey C. Howes, 2003), all published by Ariadne Press; and Wien Metropolis (2005) (Metropolis Vienna, translated by Geoffrey C. Howes, published by Green Integer in 2009).

== Decorations and awards ==
- 1973: Rauris Literature Prize
- 1980: Literature of the Cultural Fund of the City of Salzburg,
- 1986: Elias Canetti scholarship of Vienna
- 1987: Literature Prize of Salzburg
- 1991: Austrian Prize for Literature
- 1993: Franz Kafka Prize of the City of Klosterneuburg
- 1996: Austrian Cross of Honour for Science and Art
- 1997: Literature Prize of Vienna
- 1999: Anton Wildgans Prize
- 2006: Austrian Cross of Honour for Science and Art, 1st class
