= Jenny Aloni =

German-Israeli author (1917–1993)

- יני אלוני
- Born: Jenny Rosenbaum; September 7, 1917; Paderborn, German Empire
- Died: September 30, 1993 (aged 76); Ganei Yehuda, Israel
- Occupation: Author

Jenny Aloni (Hebrew: יני אלוני; née Jenny Rosenbaum יני רוזנבאום, September 7, 1917 – September 30, 1993) was a German–Israeli author, who is considered one of the most important authors of German-language literature in Israel.

== Life ==
=== Youth ===
Jenny Rosenbaum grew up as the youngest of three sisters, the daughter of the merchant Moritz Rosenbaum and his wife Henriette, née Eichengrün, in a Jewish family that had been established in Paderborn for centuries. The father ran a fur and scrap metal business with his brother Sally in the family home. She attended the Catholic Lyceum St. Michaels-Kloster in Paderborn, a girls' school run by Augustinian choir women, from 1924 to the eleventh grade in 1935.

Due to the increasing antisemitic hostility she became intensively involved with Zionism from 1933 onwards and decided, against her parents' wishes, to drop out of school and emigrate to Palestine. In 1935, to prepare for her emigration to Palestine, she was at the Hakhshara training center Gut Winkel near Spreenhagen, where she, among other things, learned to grow fruit and vegetables.

=== Berlin ===
Out of consideration for her parents, she stopped planning to emigrate and from 1936 attended the school of the Israelite Synagogue Community Adass Yisroel in Berlin until she graduated from high school. She made contacts with socialist groups within the Zionist movement and learned Hebrew and Arabic. In 1939 she graduated from high school and worked as a group leader in a Hakhshara camp in Świbinki (German name: Schniebinchen), in Lower Lusatia. She described this place as a "happy island" where the Nazi dictatorship could be temporarily forgotten.

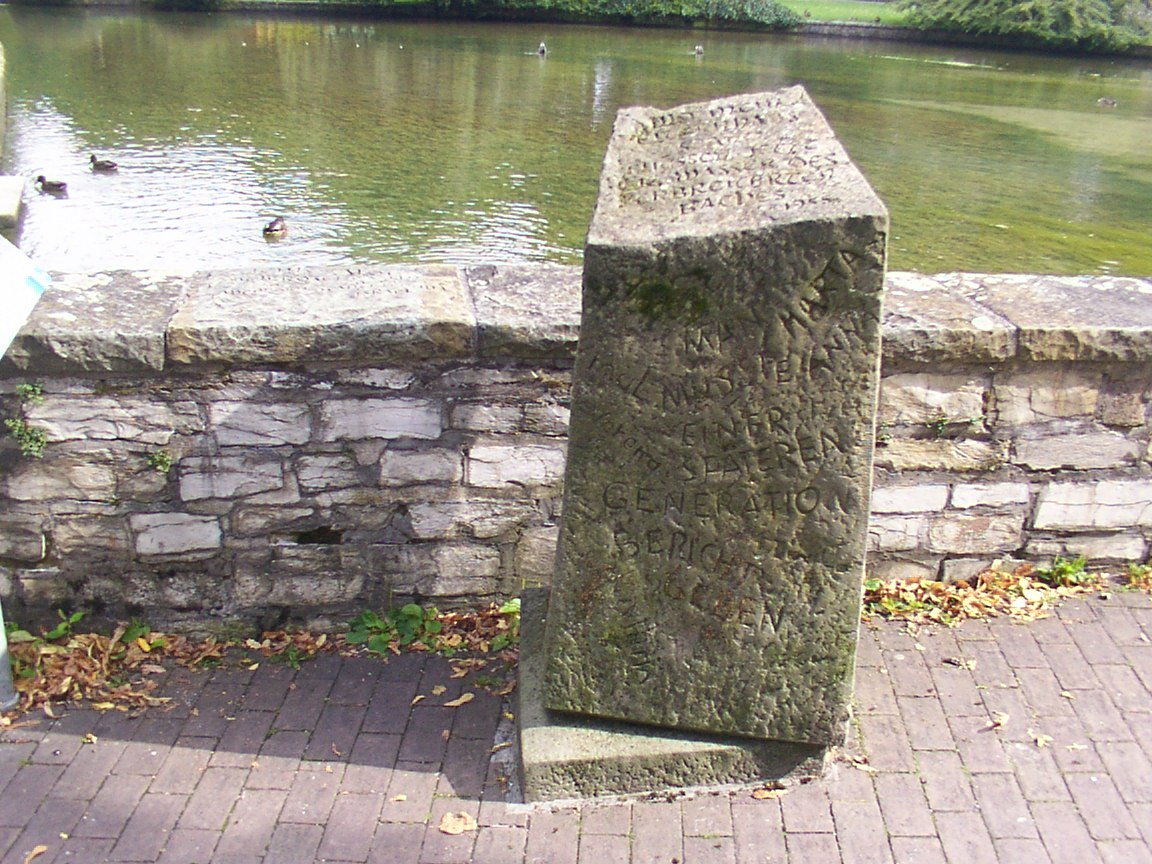
Jenny Aloni memorial stone on the spot where her birthplace was

Jenny Rosenbaum's last visit to Paderborn before emigrating was immediately after the pogrom of November 9th and 10th, 1938. Her parents' house was almost completely destroyed, and the furnishings and business were smashed. Father and uncle had been taken to the Buchenwald concentration camp and the forced closure of the business was imminent. In November 1939, Jenny Aloni made it to Palestine via Trieste with a transport of Jewish children and young people. In 1942 her sister was deported (destination and place of death are unknown). Her parents were sent to the Theresienstadt concentration camp, where her father died in 1944; The mother was deported to Auschwitz in the same year; the exact year of her death is unknown.

=== Israel ===
Jenny Rosenbaum studied at the Hebrew University of Jerusalem with the help of a scholarship, but had to work as a domestic helper to support herself. She also did voluntary social work for neglected children and young people. In 1942 she reported for medical service in the Jewish Brigade of the British Army. She finished her army service in 1946 and then attended a school for social work. In 1946 she stayed in Paris and Munich to help with the repatriation of Jewish displaced persons to their home countries or with their emigration to Palestine.

In 1948, Jenny Rosenbaum married Esra Aloni, who had immigrated to Palestine in 1934. Jenny Aloni was a medic during the Jewish-Arab War in 1948. Their daughter Ruth was born in 1950. In 1955, Jenny Aloni visited her hometown of Paderborn for the first time since 1938. The Aloni family had lived in Ganei Yehuda near Tel Aviv since 1957 (Ganei Yehuda has been a district of Savyon since 2004). From 1963 to 1981 Jenny Aloni was a volunteer at the psychiatric clinic in Be'er Ya'akov.

Jenny Aloni died on September 30, 1993, in Ganei Yehuda.

== Work ==
Jenny Aloni has been writing literary texts since her youth, encouraged by a German teacher. Even after her emigration, she wrote primarily in German. Her work consists of novels, stories, poems and diaries and is strongly autobiographical. Jenny Aloni's language often mixes an almost existentialist, outdated pathos with brief and precise.

Jenny Aloni's themes are, on the one hand, her childhood and youth experiences in the Third Reich. The fifteen-year-old consciously experienced the day the National Socialists came to power as a break: "That evening the bridge broke between her and the others." She usually only describes the loss of her family members in hints. On the other hand, Jenny Aloni's work deals with the integration of people from different backgrounds in Israel and the Jewish-Palestinian conflict.

In the 1960s the writer's work attracted short-term attention. Her first novel Cypresses Don't Break (German: Zypressen zerbrechen nicht) was praised by Max Brod and was reprinted after just one year. Heinrich Böll commented favorably on some of her short stories. In 1967 the author received the culture prize of the city of Paderborn.

In the 1970s the author could no longer find a publisher; she self-published in Tel Aviv. A selection volume published in 1987 with works from 40 years brought her some attention from literary critics. "Since the edition of her work has made it possible to provide an overview of her work, Jenny Aloni has been considered the most important of those who write in the German language in Israel – still or again.". In 1993, the Neue Zürcher Zeitung named her one of the "most prominent storytellers of her generation".

Jenny Aloni was a long-time member of the Association of German-Speaking Writers in Israel (VdSI), which was founded in Tel Aviv in 1975 by the journalist Meir Marcell Faerber. Since 1992, the Jenny Aloni Archive at the University of Paderborn has been responsible for maintaining her work and her legacy.

== Famous quotation ==
I suffer from the Land of Israel as I used to suffer from Germany. I am a stranger here and there. It almost seems to me as if this current foreignness is harder to break, because it is rooted deeper in the language, in the relationship to the people and, last but not least, in the fact that the country should actually be closer to me with its life.

— Jenny Aloni shortly after her arrival in Palestine

== Works ==
=== Poetry and prose ===
- Gedichte (Poems). Henn, Ratingen bei Düsseldorf 1956.
- Zypressen zerbrechen nicht (Cypress trees do not break). Novel. Eckart, Witten – Berlin 1961.
- Jenseits der Wüste (Beyond the desert). Stories. Eckart, Witten – Berlin 1963.
- Der blühende Busch. Wege nach Hause (The flowering bush. Ways home). Novel. Eckart, Witten – Berlin 1964.
- Die silbernen Vögel (The silver birds). Stories. Starczweski, München 1967.
- Der Wartesaal (The waiting room). Novel. Herder, Freiburg i. Br., Basel und Wien 1969.
- In den schmalen Stunden der Nacht (In the narrow hours of the night). Poems. Eigenverlag, Ganei Yehuda 1980.
- Die braunen Pakete (The brown packages). Stories. Alon, Ganei Yehuda 1983.

=== Collections ===
- Ausgewählte Werke. 1939–1986. (Selected Works. 1939–1986) Published by Friedrich Kienecker and Hartmut Steinecke. Schöningh, Paderborn – München – Wien – Zürich 1987.
- Gesammelte Werke in Einzelausgaben. (Collected works in individual editions.) Published by Friedrich Kienecker and Hartmut Steinecke. Schöningh, Paderborn – München – Wien – Zürich
  - Volume 1: Das Brachland. Aufzeichnungen aus einer Einsamkeit. (The wasteland. Records from a loneliness). 1990.
  - Volume 2: Zypressen zerbrechen nicht. (Cypress trees do not break). Novel. 1990.
  - Volume 3: Erzählungen und Skizzen 1. (Stories and sketches 1). 1991.
  - Volume 4: Der blühende Busch. Wege nach Hause. (The flowering bush. Ways home.) Novel. 1992.
  - Volume 5: Der Wartesaal. (The waiting room) Novel. 1992.
  - Volume 6: Erzählungen und Skizzen 2. (Stories and sketches 2). 1994.
  - Volume 7: Gedichte. (Poems) 1995.
  - Volume 8: Korridore oder das Gebäude mit der weißen Maus. (Corridors or the building with the white mouse.) 1996.
  - Volume 9: Kurze Prosa. (Short Prosa) 1996.
  - Volume 10: Berichte. Gedichte in Prosa. Hörspiele. Gespräche. (Reports. Poems in prose. Radio plays. Conversations.) 1997.
- „… man müßte einer späteren Generation Bericht geben". Ein literarisches Lesebuch zur deutsch-jüdischen Geschichte und eine Einführung in Leben und Werk Jenny Alonis. (“… one would have to give a report to a later generation". A literary reader on German-Jewish history and an introduction to the life and work of Jenny Aloni.) Published by Hartmut Steinecke. Schöningh, Paderborn – München – Wien – Zürich 1995.
- „Ich möchte auf Dauer in keinem anderen Land leben." Ein israelisches Lesebuch 1939–1993. (“I don’t want to live in any other country in the long term." An Israeli reader 1939–1993.) Published by Hartmut Steinecke. Schöningh, Paderborn – München – Wien – Zürich 2000.
- „Ich muss mir diese Zeit von der Seele schreiben …" Die Tagebücher 1935–1993: Deutschland – Palästina -Israel. (“I have to get this time off my chest…" The diaries 1935–1993: Germany – Palestine – Israel.) Published by Hartmut Steinecke. Schöningh, Paderborn – München – Wien – Zürich 2006.
- Kristall und Schäferhund. (Crystal and German Shepherd.) In: Joachim Meynert (publisher): Ein Spiegel des eigenen Ich. Selbstzeugnisse antisemitisch Verfolgter. (A mirror of your own self. Self-testimonies of those persecuted for anti-Semitic reasons.) Pendragon, Brackwede 1988, ISBN 3-923306-71-7, S. 86–112.
- Lesebuch Jenny Aloni (Reading book Jenny Aloni). Compiled and with an afterword by Hartmut Steinecke in Nylands Kleine Westfälische Bibliothek. Bd. 35 (Nyland's Small Westphalian Library. Vol. 35). Aisthesis, Bielefeld 2012, ISBN 978-3-89528-944-6 (online; PDF; 6.4 MB).

== Awards ==
- 1967: Kulturpreis der Stadt Paderborn
- 1991: Meersburger Droste-Preis
- 1991: Annette-von-Droste-Hülshoff-Preis

== Honors ==
At the University of Paderborn, the international meeting center building built in 1989 was named after Aloni and is called the Jenny Aloni House. There are apartments for the accommodation of visiting scientists and an event area for international meetings and conferences. The University of Paderborn also has the Jenny Aloni Center, which supports doctoral students, postdocs and junior professors. The city of Paderborn named a path after her in the Paderquelle Park.
