= Marianne Fritz =

Austrian writer

Marianne Fritz (14 December 1948 – 1 October 2007) was an Austrian writer and novelist. She is known for her multi-volume series of novels dealing with the history of Austria in the twentieth century. Her work is also noted for its experimental nature and extraordinary length. Her first novel, the 1978 The Weight of Things was awarded that year's Robert Walser Prize.

== Early life ==
Marianne Fritz was born in Weiz, a municipality in Styria, Austria. In the 1970s, she married the writer Wolfgang Fritz and moved to Vienna, where she would live the rest of her life.

== Career ==
In 1978, she published her first novel Die Schwerkraft der Verhältnisse (The Weight of Things), for which she was awarded that year's Robert Walser Prize.

The publication of this novel marked the beginning of a massive, multi-volume project referred to as Die Festung (The Fortress). This project was based on the history of the First and Second Austrian Republics. She would work on it for the rest of her life.

She published her second novel and the first volume of this project in 1980 as Das Kind der Gewalt und die Sterne der Romani (The Child of Violence and the Stars of the Romani). This complex novel sold poorly, leading her publisher to drop her.

She next published Dessen Sprache du nicht verstehst (Whose Language You Do Not Understand) in 1986. The 3,300-plus page novel was noted for its complexity and linguistic experimentation. The work was received with mostly hostile reviews at the time.

She continued to push the linguistic boundaries of German with the publication in the 1990s of two additional volumes of Die Festung under the names Naturgemäß I and II.

== Death and legacy ==
Marianne Fritz died in 2007 in Vienna at the age of 58 after a serious blood infection. At the time of her death, she left behind an unfinished draft for Naturgemäß III.

In November 2014, a park was named in her honor in Wien-Neubau.

== Bibliography ==
- Die Schwerkraft der Verhältnisse (S. Fischer, 1978). The Weight of Things, trans. Adrian Nathan West (Dorothy, 2015; ISBN 978-0-9897607-7-5).
- Das Kind der Gewalt und die Sterne der Romani (S. Fischer, 1980).
- Was soll man da machen (Suhrkamp, 1985). The first 215 pages of Dessen Sprache du nicht verstehst.
- Dessen Sprache du nicht verstehst (Suhrkamp, 1986). Published in both three-volume and twelve-volume editions.
- Naturgemäß I. Entweder Angstschweiß / Ohnend / Oder Pluralhaft (Suhrkamp, 1996). Published in five volumes.
- Naturgemäß II. Es ist ein Ros entsprungen / Wedernoch / heißt sie (Suhrkamp, 1998). Published in five volumes.
- Naturgemäß III. Oder doch / Noli me tangere / "Rührmichnichtan!" (2011). Published online.

== Awards and honors ==
- 1978 Robert-Walser-Preis
- 1979 Förderungspreis der Stadt Wien für Literatur
- 1983–85 Elias-Canetti-Stipendium der Stadt Wien
- 1986 Rauriser Literaturpreis der Österreichischen Länderbank
- 1988 Literaturpreis des Landes Steiermark
- 1989 Förderungspreis des Bundesministeriums für Unterricht, Kunst und Sport
- 1990 Robert-Musil-Stipendium des österreichischen Bundesministeriums für Unterricht, Kunst und Sport
- 1990 Förderungspreis zum österreichischen Würdigungspreis für Literatur
- 1994 Literaturpreis der Stadt Wien
- 1998 Österreichischer Würdigungspreis für Literatur
- 1999 Peter-Rosegger-Preis
- 2001 Franz-Kafka-Preis der Stadt Klosterneuburg und der österreichischen Franz-Kafka-Literaturgesellschaft

== See also ==
- List of Austrian writers
