= Christine Busta =

Austrian poet (1915–1987)

Christine Busta (23 April 1915, Vienna, Austria – 3 December 1987, Vienna) was an Austrian poet and children's writer.

In her work, she stood for an undogmatic Catholicism.

== Awards and honours ==
- 1950 Promotion Prize for Literature
- 1954 Georg Trakl Prize
- 1961 Promotion Prize for Literature
- 1963 Droste Prize
- 1964 Literary Prize of the City of Vienna
- 1969 Grand Austrian State Prize for Literature
- 1975 Anton Wildgans Prize
- 1980 Honorary Medal of the capital Vienna in gold
- 1980 Austrian Medal for Science and Art
- 1981 Theodor Körner Prize
