= Ursula Poznanski =

Austrian writer (born 1968)

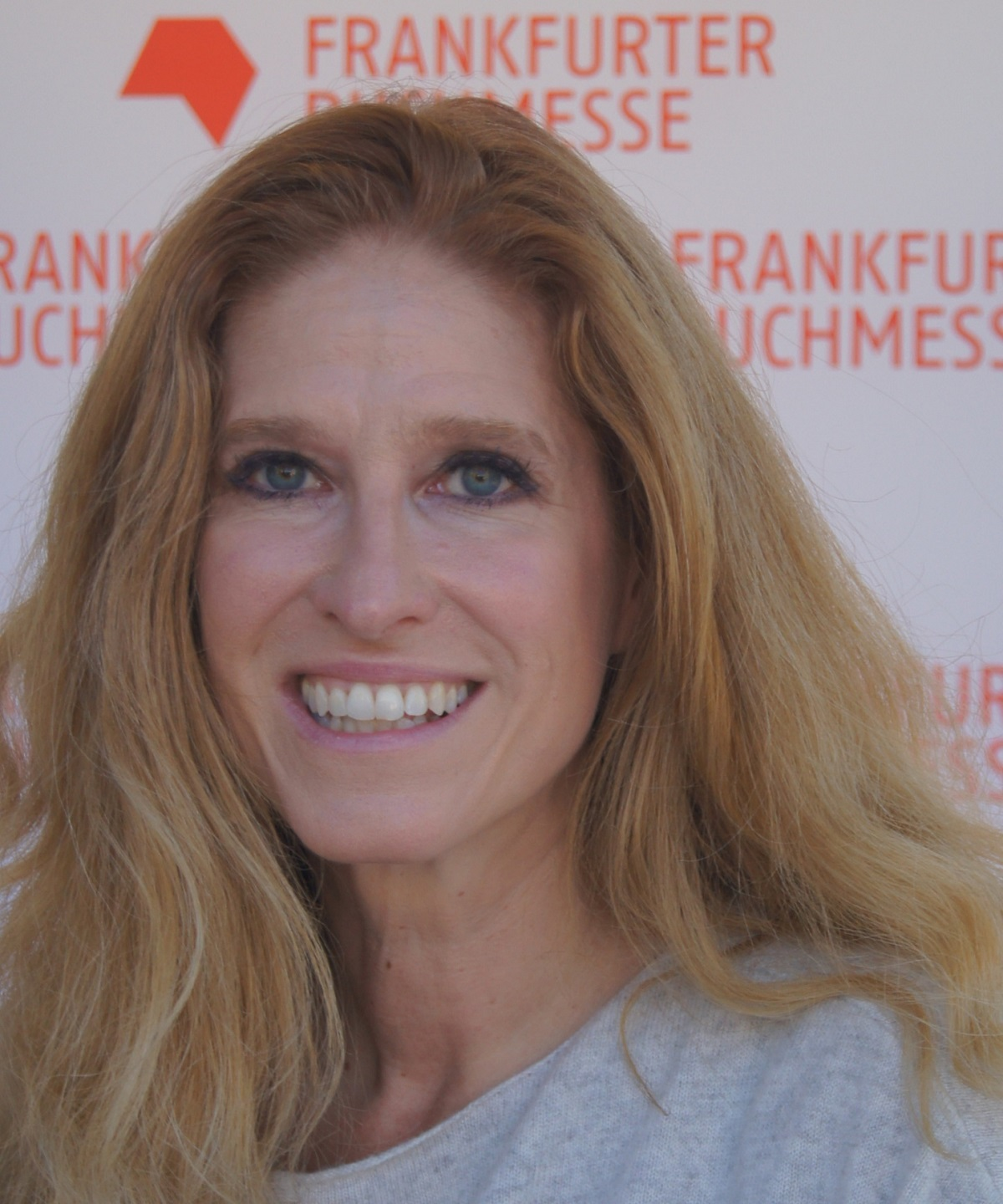
Poznanski in 2018

Ursula Poznanski (born October 30, 1968) is an Austrian writer. She won the Deutscher Jugendliteraturpreis (German Children's Literature Award), Jugendjury (Youth Jury) prize in 2011 for her thriller novel Erebos, which has been translated into 22 languages.

== Life and work ==
Ursula Poznanski was born in Vienna and grew up in Perchtoldsdorf and, after completing high school, took courses in Japanese studies, journalism, law and theater studies at the University of Vienna, but did not complete a degree. In 1996, she began working as an editor in a medical publishing house. In 2000, after the birth of her son, she took part in a scriptwriting competition run by the Austrian Broadcasting Corporation; her script for a romantic comedy did not win.

In 2001, her first manuscript Buchstabendschungel was accepted by the Austrian publishing house Dachs and was published in 2003. In the following years she released more children's books and worked in parallel on her first young adult novel. However, she found when searching for a publisher that her book did not fit the market requirements. She instead wrote the manuscript for her first youth thriller Erebos, which was published in 2010 by Loewe Verlag.

She lives with her family in the south of Vienna.

== Awards ==
- 2005: Kinder- und Jugendbuchpreis der Stadt Wien (Child and Youth Book Prize of the City of Vienna) for Die allerbeste Prinzessin
- 2010: Ulmer Unke for Erebos
- 2011: Deutscher Jugendliteraturpreis (German Children's Literature Award), Jugendjury (Youth Jury) award for Erebos
- 2011: JuBu Buch des Monats (JuBu Book of the Month) for Erebos
- 2012: Kinder-/Jugendhörbuch des Monats (Children's / Young Adult's Book of the Month) for January 2012 for hr2-kultur's Hörbuchbestenliste, 3rd place for Saeculum
- 2012: Saeculum was included in the collection published by Österreichischer Staatspreis für Kinder- und Jugendliteratur (Austrian Children and Youth Book Prize)
- 2016: Hansjörg-Martin-Preis – Kinder- und Jugendkrimipreis (Hansjörg Martin Prize for Child and Youth Crime) for Layers
- 2018: Österreichischer Krimipreis (Austrian Crime Award)

== Works ==
Vanitas series (thriller)

- Vanitas: Schwarz wie Erde. Knaur, München 2019, ISBN 978-3-426-22686-5

Youth thrillers

- Erebos. Loewe, Bindlach 2010, ISBN 978-3-7855-7788-2
- Saeculum. Loewe, Bindlach 2011, ISBN 978-3-7855-7028-9
- Layers. Loewe, Bindlach 2015, ISBN 978-3-7855-8230-5
- Elanus. Loewe, Bindlach 2016, ISBN 978-3-7855-8231-2
- Aquila. Loewe, Bindlach 2017, ISBN 978-3-7855-8613-6
- Thalamus. Loewe, Bindlach 2018, ISBN 978-3-7855-8614-3
- Erebos 2. Loewe, Bindlach 2019, ISBN 978-3-7432-0049-4
- Cryptos. Loewe, Bindlach 2020, ISBN 978-3-7432-0050-0
- Shelter. Loewe, Bindlach 2021, ISBN 978-3-7432-0051-7
- Scandor. Loewe, Bindlach 2024, ISBN 978-3-7432-1659-4

Thrillers (single volumes)

- Die Burg. Knaur, Munich 2024, ISBN 978-3-426-44837-3

Beatrice-Kaspary series (thrillers)

- Fünf. Wunderlich, Reinbek 2012, ISBN 978-3-8052-5031-3
- Blinde Vögel. Wunderlich, Reinbek 2013, ISBN 978-3-8052-5045-0
- Stimmen. Wunderlich, Reinbek 2015, ISBN 978-3-8052-5062-7
- Schatten. Wunderlich, Reinbek 2017, ISBN 978-3-8052-5063-4

Eleria trilogy (dystopian)

- Die Verratenen. Loewe, Bindlach 2012, ISBN 978-3-7855-7546-8.
- Die Verschworenen. Loewe, Bindlach 2013, ISBN 978-3-7855-7547-5.
- Die Vernichteten. Loewe, Bindlach 2014, ISBN 978-3-7855-7548-2.

Children's books

- Theo Piratenkönig. Illustrated by Friedericke Rave. Dachs, Wien 2003, ISBN 3-85191-308-6
- Spanier küssen anders. G&G, Wien 2008, ISBN 978-3-7074-0402-9
- Buchstabendschungel. Illustrated by Jens Rassmus. Dachs, Wien 2003, ISBN 3-85191-308-6
- All diese Zahlen. Illustrated by Jens Rassmus. Dachs, Wien 2004, ISBN 978-385191-348-4
- Die allerbeste Prinzessin. Drawings and collages by Sybille Hein. Loewe, Bindlach 2018, ISBN 978-3-7855-8578-8
- Redaktion Tintenklex: Das Geheimnis der 67 Erpresserbriefe.
- Redaktion Tintenklex: Das geheimnisvolle Grab.
- Pauline Pechfee. Illustrated by Friederike Rave. Residenz 2007, ISBN 978-3-70172025-5

Collaborations

- Fremd. With Arno Strobel. Wunderlich, Reinbek 2015, ISBN 978-3-8052-5084-9
- Anonym. With Arno Strobel. Wunderlich, Reinbek 2016, ISBN 978-3-8052-5085-6
- Invisible. With Arno Strobel. Wunderlich, Reinbek 2018, ISBN 978-3-8052-0015-8

Contributions to:

- O Gruselgraus!
- Wenn du ein Gespenst kennst ...

== See also ==
- List of Austrian writers
