= Helen Meier =

Swiss writer (1929–2021)

- Born: 17 April 1929; Mels, Switzerland
- Died: 13 February 2021 (aged 91); Trogen, Switzerland
- Occupation: Writer

Helen Meier (17 April 1929 – 13 February 2021) was a Swiss writer and teacher. She wrote eight collections of short stories and three novels, and was awarded a number of prizes, including the Rauris Literature Prize, the Schweizerische Schillerstiftung prize twice, the Droste-Preis, and Culture Prizes from the Kantons of St. Gallen and Appenzell Ausserrhoden.

== Biography ==
Meier was born in Mels in 1929. Meier attended a Lehrerseminar in Rorschach and subsequently became a primary schoolteacher. After working in England, France, and Italy, she attended the University of Fribourg, studying languages and education. She subsequently worked for the Swiss Red Cross and as a special education teacher in Heiden. She began writing at the age of 55 in 1984, when she submitted a short story, Lichtempfindlich, for the Ingrid Bachmann Competition at the Festival of German-Language Literature. The story won the Ernst-Willner Prize and became part of her first published collection, Trockenwiese. Meier went on to publish regularly, and wrote eight collections of short stories and three novels. She was awarded a number of prizes, including the Rauris Literature Prize, the Schweizerische Schillerstiftung twice, the Droste-Preis, and Culture Prizes from the Kantons of St. Gallen and Appenzell Ausserrhoden.

Meier's last publication was a set of fairytales she had written as a young woman, The White Bird, the Hat, and the Princess, which was published in 2019.

Helen Meier died in a rest home in Trogen on her birthday, 13 February 2021, at the age of 91, after suffering from dementia.

== Awards ==
- Ernst-Willner-Preis (1984)
- Rauris Literature Prize (1985)
- Prize of the Schweizerische Schillerstiftung (1985)
- Prize of the Schweizerische Schillerstiftung (2000)
- Contribution to Pro Helvetia (2000)
- Droste-Preis (2000)
- Kulturpreis des Kantons St. Gallen (2001)
- Kulturpreis des Kantons Appenzell Ausserrhoden (2017)

== Works ==
- Trockenwiese (1984)
- Das einzige Objekt in Farbe (1985)
- Das Haus am See (1987)
- Das Gelächter (1989)
- Lebenleben (1989)
- Der Thurgau und seine Menschen (1990)
- Die Suche nach dem Paradies. 36 Photographien aus dem Appenzellerland (1991)
- Nachtbuch (1992)
- Die Thur. Von der Quelle bis zur Mündung (1992)
- Die Novizin (1995)
- Letzte Warnung (1996)
- Liebe Stimme (2000)
- Adieu, Herr Landammann! Sieben Begegnungen mit Jacob Zellweger-Zuberbühler (2001)
- Schlafwandel. Eine Erzählung (2006)
- Kleine Beweise der Freundschaft (2014)
- Die Agonie des Schmetterlings. Böse Geschichten (2015)
- Übung im Torkeln entlang des Falls. Ein Lesebuch (2017)
- Der weisse Vogel, der Hut und die Prinzessin. 23 Märchen (2019)
