= Christoph W. Bauer =

Austrian author

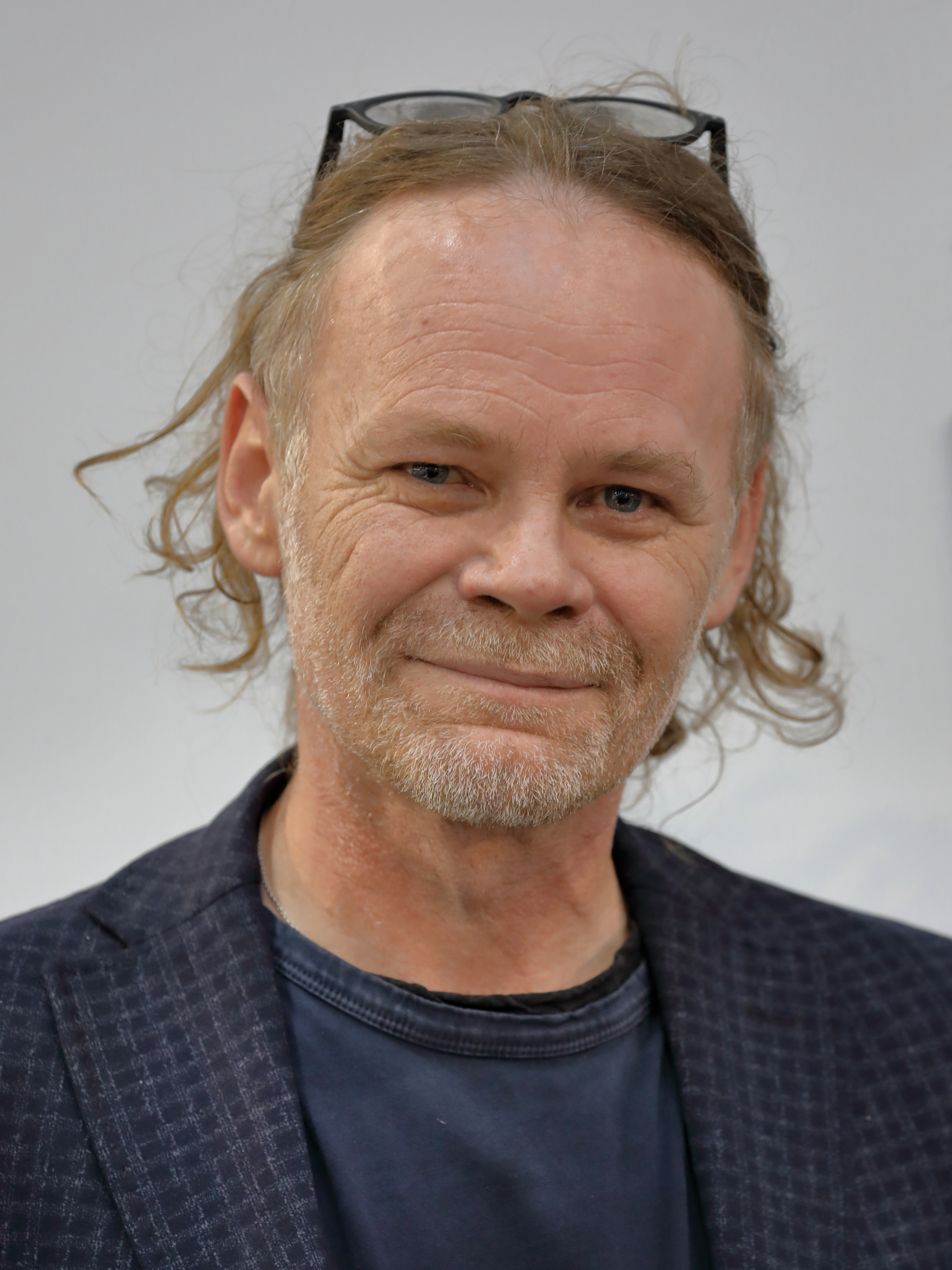
Christoph W. Bauer, 2019

Christoph W. Bauer (born 1968 in Kolbnitz) is an Austrian author. He grew up in Lienz and Kirchberg in Tirol and is currently living in Innsbruck.

His works have been awarded with the Prize of the Academy of Graz (2001), with the Reinhard-Priessnitz-Prize (2001) and the Prize for Lyricism by the city Innsbruck (2002). Furthermore, he won the 2002 Audience Award of the Ingeborg-Bachmann-Competition in Klagenfurt. Christoph W. Bauer was also chief editor of the literary journal Wagnis.

Christoph W. Bauer explains his work as a continuation of existing traditions. He identifies himself with a poeta legens, who finds, changes, renews and continues topics from the world literature.

== Publications ==
- wege verzweigt, poems, Haymon, 1999 ISBN 978-3-7099-8224-2
- die mobilität des wassers müßte man mieten können, poems, Haymon, 2001 ISBN 978-3-85218-352-7
- fontanalia.fragmente, poems and prose, Haymon Verlag, 2003, ISBN 3-85218-437-1
- Aufstummen, novel, Haymon, 2004, ISBN 3-85218-460-6
- supersonic, poems, Edition Korrespondenzen, 2005, ISBN 3-902113-39-1
- Und immer wieder Cordoba, radio play (premiere: ORF Landesstudio Tirol, 2006
- Ahoi!, poams Haymon Verlag, 2007 (Hrsg.) ISBN 978-3-85218-522-4
- Miles G., play (premiere: 1 March 2007, Westbahntheater/Innsbruck)
- Im Alphabet der Häuser. Roman einer Stadt, Haymon, 2007, ISBN 3-85218-546-7
- Graubart Boulevard, Haymon, 2008, ISBN 978-3-85218-572-9

== See also ==
- List of Austrian writers
