= Christian Enzensberger =

German professor and translator (1931–2009)

- Born: 24 December 1931; Nuremberg, Germany
- Died: 27 January 2009 (aged 77); Munich, Germany
- Occupation: Professor of English Literature
- Writing career
- Notable works: Smut: An Anatomy of Dirt; translation of Alice's Adventures in Wonderland, and Alice through the Looking-Glass

Christian Enzensberger (24 December 1931 – 27 January 2009) was a German Professor of English studies, author and a translator of English literature into German.

== Life ==
Born in Nuremberg, Enzensberger was one of the more enigmatic figures in German letters. Younger brother of the literary celebrity and political figure Hans Magnus Enzensberger, he maintained a relatively low media profile throughout his career, in spite of being embroiled in one of the more interesting literary scandals of early 70s Germany.

From 1969 until 1994, Enzensberger held a post as Professor of English Literature at LMU Munich. He is today chiefly known in Germany for his 1963 translation of Lewis Carroll's Alice's Adventures in Wonderland and Alice through the Looking-Glass.

In 1970, Enzensberger became the only author ever to refuse the Literaturpreis der Stadt Bremen, offered in the wake of the publication of Größerer Versuch über den Schmutz (translated by Sandra Morris and published by Calder & Boyars in 1972 as Smut: An Anatomy of Dirt). The book generated a furore when it was first published in Germany, not least due to its linking of personal cleanliness with totalitarianism. Smut is an experimental work in which dirt is described scientifically, personally and perversely by a panoply of narrative voices, including fragments from the anthropologist Mary Douglas alongside writers from Samuel Beckett through William S. Burroughs to Jean Genet. It has since then fallen into neglect and remains out of print in both English and German.

He died in Munich in January 2009.

== Published works (selection) ==
- Größerer Versuch über den Schmutz. 1968 (Smut: An Anatomy of Dirt. 1972, translated by Sandra Morris) published in the U.S. by Continuum Books in 1974.
- Viktorianische Lyrik. Tennyson und Swinburne in der Geschichte der Entfremdung. Hanser Verlag, München 1969
- Literatur und Interesse – Eine politische Ästhetik mit zwei Beispielen aus der englischen Literatur. Band 1: Theorie. Band 2: Beispiele, Shakespeare ‚Der Kaufmann von Venedig’, Dickens ‚Oliver Twist’. Suhrkamp Verlag, Frankfurt am Main 1977 (Zweite, fortgeschriebene Fassung 1981, ISBN 3-518-27902-5)
- Brief an Herbert Marcuse. Akzente. Issue 1, 1978. February 25, 1978
- Was ist was. Greno Verlag, Nördlingen 1987, ISBN 3-891-90233-6

== Translations (selection) ==
- Von Hopkins bis Dylan Thomas. Englische Gedichte und deutsche Prosaübertragungen. Gemeinsam mit Ursula Clemen, Fischer Verlag, Frankfurt am Main 1961
- George D. Painter: Marcel Proust. Teil 1. Suhrkamp Verlag, Frankfurt am Main 1962
- Giorgos Seferis: Poesie. Gedichte. Griechisch und deutsch. Suhrkamp Verlag, Frankfurt am Main 1962, 4th Edition 2005. ISBN 3-518-01962-7
- Lewis Carroll: Alice im Wunderland. Insel Verlag, Frankfurt am Main 1963, TB ISBN 3-458-31742-2
- Lewis Carroll: Alice hinter den Spiegeln. Insel Verlag, Frankfurt am Main 1963, TB ISBN 3-458-31797-X
- Edith Sitwell: Gedichte. Englisch und deutsch. Translated by Christian Enzensberger, Erich Fried and Werner Vordtriede, Insel Verlag, Frankfurt am Main 1964
- Ogden Nash: I’m a Stranger Here Myself. Selected Poems – Ich bin leider hier auch fremd. Ausgewählte Gedichte. Adaptations by Christian Enzensberger, Walter Mehring and Ulrich Sonnemann, Rowohlt Verlag, Reinbek 1969
- Edward Bond: Trauer zu früh. Suhrkamp Verlag, Frankfurt am Main 1969
- Edward Bond: Lear. Suhrkamp Verlag, Frankfurt am Main 1972
- T. S. Eliot: Gesammelte Gedichte 1909–1962. Zweisprachige Ausgabe. Translated from English by Christian Enzensberger et al., Suhrkamp Verlag, Frankfurt am Main 1972, TB 2002 ISBN 3-518-38067-2
- Edward Bond: Bingo. Szenen von Geld und Tod. Suhrkamp Verlag, Frankfurt am Main 1975
- Ian McEwan: Der Zementgarten. Translated from English by a student workgroup supervised by Christian Enzensberger, Diogenes Verlag, Zürich 1980, TB ISBN 3-257-20648-8
- Samuel Beckett: Mehr Prügel als Flügel. Suhrkamp Verlag, Frankfurt am Main 1989, TB ISBN 3-518-39183-6

== Secondary literature (selection) ==
- Sauber ist nicht Schön ("Clean is not Beautiful"), Review of ″Größerer Versuch über den Schmutz″ by Wolfgang Hildesheimer published in Der Spiegel, issue 1, 1969 page 96. (in german)
