= Alma Wittlin =

Austrian writer

Alma Stephanie Wittlin, Alma S. Wittlin, (March 23, 1899 Lemberg – December 31, 1991 Palo Alto) was an Austrian writer art historian, writer, educational theorist, émigré to Britain and the United States, and a museologist and heritologist. Her surname also appears as Wittlin-Frischauer.

== Life ==
Born in or near Lviv, Austro-Hungarian Empire, she was educated in Vienna, receiving a doctorate in art history from the University of Vienna in 1925, and came to England in 1937. She carried out educational research at the Museum of Archaeology and Anthropology, University of Cambridge. In 1952, she came to the United States and was naturalized in 1959.

In 1921, she married Paul Max Frischauer.

While in Austria, she wrote a number of successful historical novels.

Wittlin spent her youth in Vienna, where she attended Eugenie Schwarzwald’s famous reform-oriented secondary school, which helped her overcome the narrow-mindedness passed down in her family. She completed her school-leaving exams in 1918 and studied art history, anthropology, and philosophy in Vienna. In 1921 she married Paul Max Frischauer (1898-1977) - the marriage lasted until 1932). In 1925 she earned her doctorate in art history at the University of Vienna under Josef Strzygowski (second examiner Julius Schlosser). Her dissertation, Die christliche Baukunst des ersten Jahrtausends in Spanien, was published by De Gruyter in Berlin as Altspanischer Kirchenbau (1930, 1978).

After 1925 she worked briefly in Berlin as a volunteer at the Kaiser Friedrich Museum, in the Department of Byzantine and Oriental Art.

As a writer and journalist she contributed to the feuilleton, wrote for scholarly and popular journals, produced essays on architecture and on questions concerning the modern woman’s way of life, and gave lectures at the Vienna Volkshochschule. Several trips to Spain deepened her knowledge of the country, which she drew upon in a popular historical novel, Isabella. Begründerin der Weltmacht Spanien, using it also to comment on the historical background of art as well as sociological and psychological aspects of artistic creation.

The Isabella book is the first historical biography of the queen in German; in her portrayal Wittlin combines aspects of art history, archaeology, philosophy, and anthropology—in short, many cultural‑studies perspectives—with close study of the sources. Wittlin depicts the power politics of individuals and cliques during a time of rapid change. Isabella is presented as an extraordinary person, shaped by her hopes and her psychological constitution. These factors contributed, at the turn from the Middle Ages to the Renaissance, to the emergence of a proto‑national Spain, with its concentrated focus on a power‑displaying nobility. The book was soon translated into four languages: English, Spanish, Italian, and Hungarian.

In May 1933, at the P.E.N. Congress in Ragusa (today Dubrovnik), she advocated for the declaration by German‑language authors against the persecution of intellectuals by the National Socialist German Reich (the declaration passed despite resistance).

Of Jewish descent, though baptized Protestant, Wittlin left Austria for England in 1937. In a foreign‑language environment and without income, she received support from the International and the British Federation of University Women. At the Archaeological‑Anthropological Museum in Cambridge she studied how museum exhibitions could be made more enjoyable and fruitful for the general public through more targeted preparation. Wittlin’s progressive ideas, published in 1949 in the series International Library of Sociology and Social Reconstruction edited by Karl Mannheim, met with fierce resistance from conservative museum circles in Britain.

Wittlin called for museums to take their role as educational institutions more seriously.

In 1952 Wittlin emigrated to the United States, where she received permanent residency under federal law on 30 June 1954; in 1959 she became a U.S. citizen. She worked as an independent scholar and later became an internationally known museum expert.

During a decade in New Mexico, Wittlin worked to establish a children’s museum, based in Albuquerque and Santa Fe, and until 1960 served as director of a traveling museum for science and anthropology (Science Comes to You, Inc.). In 1961 she was among the first fellows of the Radcliffe Institute for Independent Studies (Cambridge, MA), which enabled her to conduct research at the Harvard Graduate School of Education.

She subsequently held shorter research appointments at various university and museum institutions (UCSB; Smithsonian Institution, Washington, D.C.), and from 1974 onward in California, where she founded and directed the Biopsychological Institute for Education.

Through her research and teaching—including adult and teacher education—Wittlin sought to encourage museums to take their social mission seriously: to value the concerns of the public, to consider people’s wishes in program planning, and to include all potentially interested individuals, not only students and teachers.

She died in Palo Alto, California.

An annual lecture given in her honour is sponsored by the International Council of Museums.

== Selected works ==
- The Museum. Its history and its tasks in education (1949)
- Museums. In search of a usable future (1970)

== See also ==
- List of Austrian writers
