= Andreas Okopenko =

Austrian writer

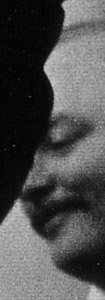

Andreas Okopenko (15 March 1930, Košice – 27 June 2010, Vienna) was an Austrian writer.

Andreas Okopenko's father was a Ukrainian physician and his mother was Austrian. From 1939, the family lived in Vienna. After studying chemistry at the University of Vienna Okopenko was active in the industry. Starting from 1950 he dedicated himself increasingly to the literature. From 1951 to 1953, he created a literature magazine, in which he published works by numerous members of the Austrian avant-garde of that time. From 1968 until his death he lived as a freelance writer in Vienna.

Okopenko was, from 1973 to 1985, a member of the Grazer author meeting and from 1999 until his death he was a member of the Austrian art senate.

== Honors ==
- 1965 Anton Wildgans price
- 1977 Austrian appreciation price for literature
- 1983 Literary award of the city Vienna
- 1993 Literary award of the Hertha Kräftner society (Grosshöflein/Burgenland)
- 1995 Golden honour medal of the city Vienna
- 1998 Grand Austrian State Prize
- 2002 George Trakl price

== Notable works ==
- Child Nazi , 1984
- Affenzucker/Neue Lockergedichte , 1999

== See also ==
- List of Austrian writers
