= Laura Freudenthaler =

Austrian writer

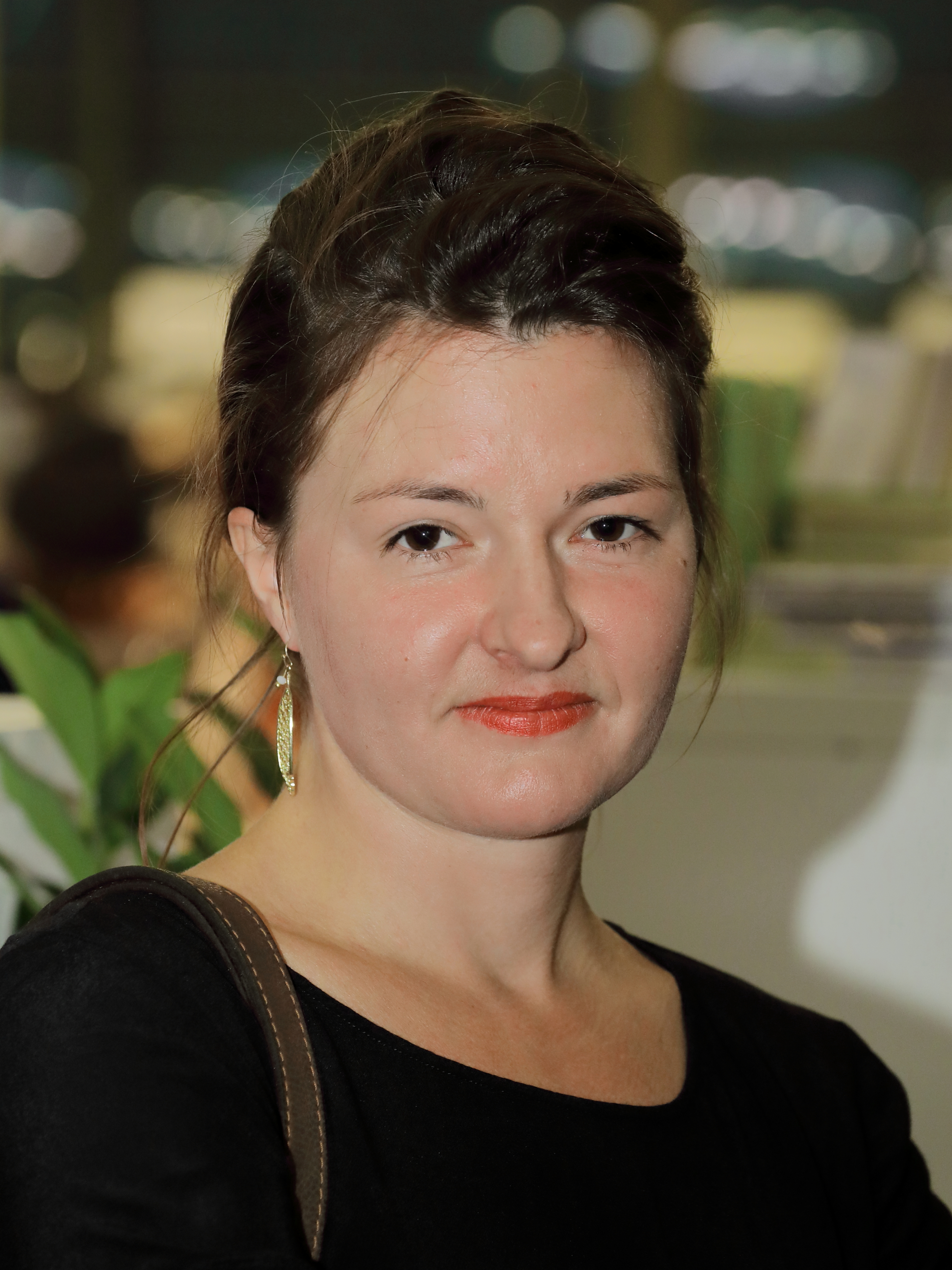
Laura Freudenthaler (2019)

Laura Freudenthaler (born 1984, Salzburg) is an Austrian writer. She studied German language and literature at the University of Vienna. Freudenthaler published a book of short stories titled Der Schädel der Madeleine in 2014. She has also published two novels: Die Königin schweigt (winner of the Förderpreis Bremen Literature Prize in 2018), and Geistergeschichte (winner of the EU Literature Prize in 2019). The novel Die Königin schweigt was also awarded Best German-Language Debut Novel at the 2018 Festival du premier Roman in Chambéry. In 2020, she was awarded the 3sat Prize (given at the Festival of German-Language Literature in Klagenfurt) for Der heißeste Sommer.

After staying in France, Freudenthaler lives since 2009 in Vienna.

== Works ==
- Freudenthaler, Laura (2014). Der Schädel von Madeleine: Paargeschichten (in German). Salzburg: Müry Salzmann. ISBN 978-3-99014-091-8. OCLC 882903538.
- —— (2017). Die Königin schweigt Roman (in German). Graz: Literaturverlag Droschl. ISBN 978-3-99059-001-0. OCLC 985978719.
- —— (2019). Geistergeschichte. Roman (in German). Graz: Literaturverlag Droschl. ISBN 978-3-99059-025-6. OCLC 1076500001.
- —— (28 August 2023). Arson (in German). Salzburg: Jung und Jung. ISBN 978-3-99027-287-9. OCLC 1399400626.
