= Austrian Decoration for Science and Art =

Austrian award

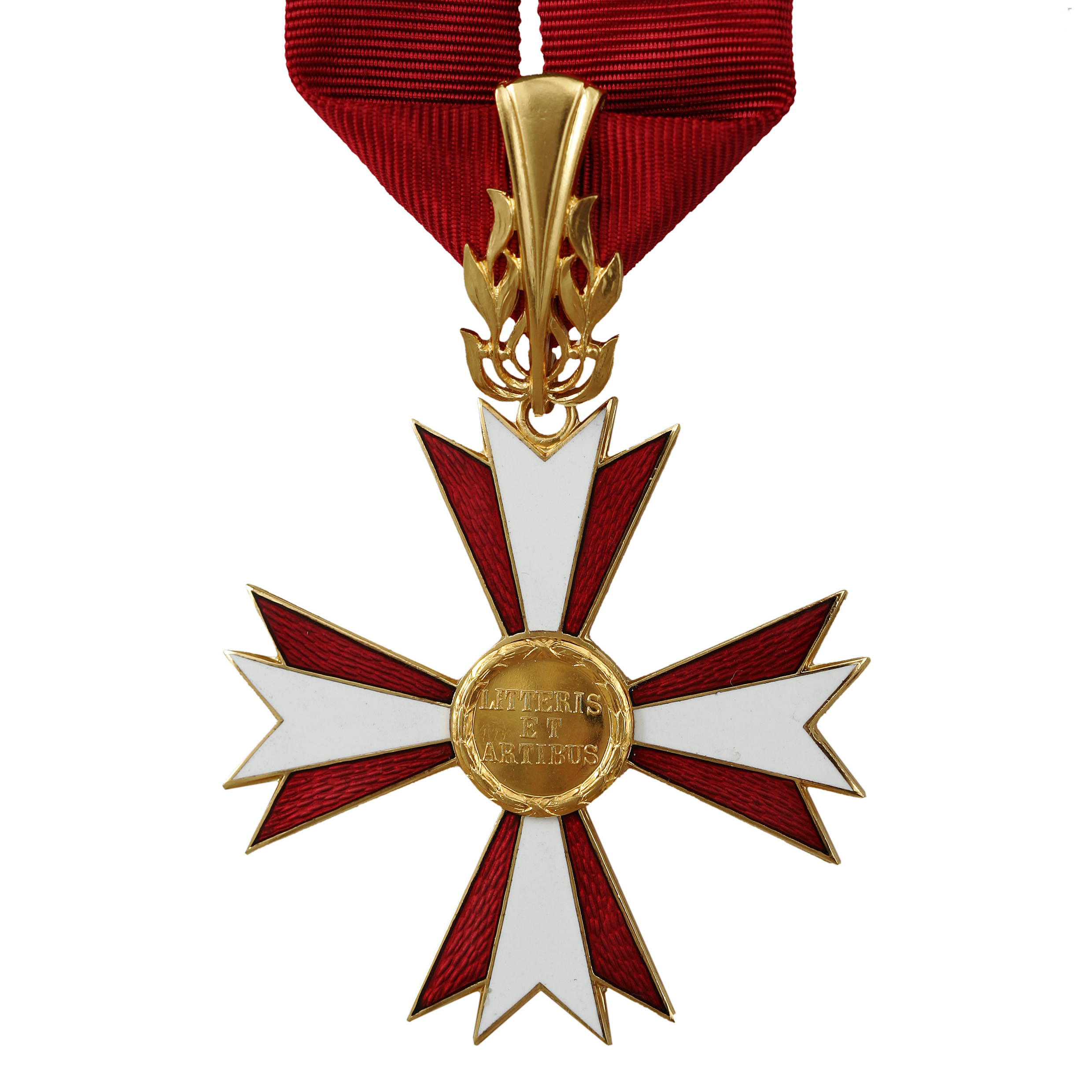
- Neck badge of the Austrian; Decoration for Science and Art
- Type: State decoration
- Awarded for: "...superior creative and commendable services in the areas of the sciences or the arts."
- Country: Republic of Austria
- Eligibility: Austrian and foreign citizens
- Motto: Litteris et Artibus
- Status: Currently awarded
- Established: 1955
- Decoration for Science and Art Cross of Honour for Science and Art, First Class Cross of Honour for Science and Art

Precedence
- Next (higher): Varies by grade
- Next (lower): Varies by grade

The Austrian Decoration for Science and Art (German: Österreichisches Ehrenzeichen für Wissenschaft und Kunst) is a state decoration of the Republic of Austria and forms part of the Austrian national honours system.

== History ==
The "Austrian Decoration for Science and Art" was established by the National Council as an honour for scientific or artistic achievements by Federal Law of May 1955 (Federal Law Gazette No. 96/1955 as amended BGBl I No 128/2001). At the same time, the National Council also established the "Austrian Cross of Honour for Science and Art", which is awarded as "Cross of Honour, First Class" (German: Ehrenkreuz 1. Klasse) and "Cross of Honour" (German: Ehrenkreuz). While not technically counted as lower classes of the Decoration for Science and Art, these crosses are nevertheless affiliated with it.

== Divisions ==
=== Decoration for Science and Art ===
The number of living recipients of the Decoration for Science and Art is limited to a maximum of 72 at any one time (36 recipients for science and 36 for arts). In each of these two groups there are 18 Austrian citizens and 18 foreign nationals.

=== Cross of Honour for Science and Art, First Class ===
There are no limits on the number of recipients.

=== Cross of Honour for Science and Art ===
There are no limits on the number of recipients.

== Precedence ==
Grade	Preceding	Following
Decoration for Science and Art	Grand Decoration of Honour in Silver with Star for Services to the Republic of Austria	Grand Decoration of Honour in Gold for Services to the Republic of Austria
Cross of Honour for Science and Art 1st Class	Military Merit Decoration	Grand Decoration of Honour for Services to the Republic of Austria
Cross of Honour for Science and Art	Grand Decoration of Honour for Services to the Republic of Austria	Decoration of Honour in Gold for Services to the Republic of Austria

== Recipients ==
=== Decoration for Science and Art ===
- 1957: Clemens Holzmeister, architect
- 1959: Max Mell, writer
- 1959: Alfred Verdross, jurist
- 1960: O. W. Fischer, actor
- 1961: Herbert von Karajan, conductor; Rudolf von Laun, international lawyer
- 1964: Edmund Hlawka, mathematician; Ernst Lothar, writer and director
- 1966: Ludwig von Ficker, writer and publisher
- 1967: Karl Heinrich Waggerl, writer; Lise Meitner, physicist
- 1969: Anny Felbermayer, soprano
- 1971: Fritz Wotruba, architect and artist
- 1972: Elias Canetti, writer
- 1974: Gottfried von Einem, composer
- 1974: Paul Hörbiger, actor
- 1975: Hans Tuppy, biochemist; Robert Stolz, composer
- 1976: Friedrich Torberg, writer and translator; Manfred Eigen, chemist
- 1977: Ernst Schönwiese, writer
- 1978: Hans Nowotny, chemist
- 1979: Roland Rainer, architect; Max Weiler, artist
- 1980: Alfred Uhl and Marcel Rubin, composer; Fritz Hochwälder, writer; Karl Popper, philosopher and science theorist
- 1981: Gertrud Fussenegger, writer; Werner Berg, painter
- 1982: Heinrich Harrer, mountaineer; Jacqueline de Romilly, philologist
- 1983: Hans Plank, painter
- 1985: Erika Mitterer, writer
- 1985: Joannis Avramidis, painter and sculptor
- 1986: Johann Jascha, artist
- 1987: Friederike Mayröcker, writer
- 1988: Dietmar Grieser, author and journalist
- 1990: Ernst Jandl, writer; Hans Hollein, architect
- 1991: H. C. Artmann, writer
- 1992: Carlos Kleiber, conductor; Krzysztof Penderecki, composer
- 1993: Margarete Schütte-Lihotzky, architect; Peter Schuster, chemist; Gottfried Biegelmeier, physicist; Walter Thirring, physicist; Albert Eschenmoser, chemist; Albrecht Schöne, philologist; Günther Wilke, chemist
- 1994: Josef Mikl, painter; Erwin Chargaff, chemist
- 1995: Horst Stein, conductor
- 1996: Siegfried Josef Bauer, meteorologist and geophysicist
- 1997: Bruno Gironcoli, artist; Kurt Schwertsik, composer; Hans Hass, biologist; Robert Walter, jurist; Albrecht Dihle, classical philologist; Cassos Karageorghis, archaeologist; Klemens von Klemperer, historian
- 1998: Hans-Jörg Wiedl reptile expert Helmut Denk, pathologist
- 1999: Carl Pruscha, architect; Elisabeth Lichtenberger, geographer; Karl Acham, sociologist; Walter Kohn, physicist
- 2000: Paul Kirchhof, constitutional and tax lawyer; Hans Müllejans, provost; Herwig Wolfram, historian; Gerardo Broggini, lawyer
- 2001: Anton Zeilinger, experimental physicist
- 2002: Arik Brauer, painter, poet and singer; Peter Wolf, Austrian-born producer and composer; Eugen Biser, religious philosopher; Horst Dreier, legal philosopher; Elliott H. Lieb, physicist and mathematician; Bogdan Bogdanović, architect
- 2003: Hermann Fillitz, art historian; Wolfgang M. Schmidt, mathematician
- 2004: Klaus Wolff, dermatologist
- 2005: Václav Havel, writer, dissident and former president of the Czech Republic; Christian Attersee, painter; Eric Kandel, neuroscientist; Peter Palese, virologist
- 2006: Bruno Ganz, actor; Stephen Toulmin, philosopher; Christian Meier, historian; Pierre Soulages, painter; Michael Mitterauer, historian
- 2007: Otto Tausig, actor
- 2008: Marina Abramović, performance artist
- 2009: Mati Sirkel, translator
- 2010: Paul Holdengräber, curator
- 2012: Christoph Waltz, actor, director.
- 2013: Gerhard Rühm, author, composer, artist
- 2014: Abbas Kiarostami, film director, screenwriter, photographer

=== Cross (and Cross 1st Class) ===
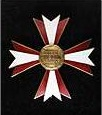
Cross of Honour for Science and Art, First Class

- 1960: Karl Schiske, composer
- 1961: Günther Baszel, artist; Ernst Lothar, author and director
- 1965: Kurt Roger, Composer / Professor Georg Szell Conductor Nathan Milstein Violin
- 1966: Herbert Zipper, Conductor / Music Educator / Composer
- 1967: Maria Augusta von Trapp, matriarch of the Trapp Family Singers
- 1968: Alphons Barb, author
- 1970: Enver Čolaković, writer and poet
- 1971: Gustav Zelibor, pianist and conductor
- 1974: Erika Mitterer, writer; Marcel Rubin, composer; Arthur Hilton, chemist,
- 1975 Karl Menger, mathematician
- 1976: Wolfgang Mayer König, writer
- 1977: Wolfgang Rehm, musicologist
- 1978: Kurt Neumüller, pianist and pedagogue
- 1980: Alfred Uhl, composer
- 1981: Thomas Christian David, conductor, composer, flutist
- 1982: Margareta Sjöstedt

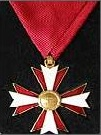
Cross of Honour for Science and Art

- 1983: Walter Bitterlich, forest scientist, Wolf Häfele, physicist
- 1984: Frank Sinatra, singer and actor, Fritz Muliar, actor and director, Ludwig Schwarzer, painter
- 1987: Sir Malcolm Pasley, literary scholar and philologist; Alois Hergouth, writer and poet; Helen Adolf, literary scholar and linguist
- 1989: Norbert Pawlicki, pianist and composer
- 1991: Neal Zaslaw, American musicologist
- 1994: Christian M. Nebehay, art dealer and author
- 1996: Ronald S. Calinger, American historian of Mathematics; Fausto Cercignani, Italian scholar, essayist and poet; Quirino Principe, Italian philosopher of music and dramatist
- 1997: Herbert Willi, composer; Lucian O. Meysels, author; Ernest Manheim, American sociologist of Hungarian origin
- 1998: Senta Berger, actress, Kiki Kogelnik, artist (posthumously awarded), Edith Neumann, microbiologist., Edmund Engelman, Jewish-Austrian, later American photographer and engineer
- 1999: Peter Simonischek, actor, Erich Gruen, historian.
- 2001: Klaus-Peter Sattler, composer, Hermann Maurer, computer scientist, Walter Homolka, rabbi; Hannspeter Winter, physicist; Johann Grander, inventor.
- 2002: Fabio Luisi, Italian conductor, Kurt Rudolf Fischer, philosopher, Wolfdietrich Schmied-Kowarzik, philosopher; John Ross, chemist; Seiji Ozawa, conductor
- 2003: Erich Schleyer, actor and author, Günther Granser, economist
- 2004: Oswald Oberhuber, artist, Hans Winter, veterinary pathologist
- 2005: Gottfried Kumpf, painter, architect, sculptor, Georg Ratzinger, choirmaster, Heinz Zemanek, computer pioneer
- 2006: Peter Ruzicka, German composer and artistic director, Lothar Bruckmeier, painter, Peter Wegner, computer scientist, Elisabeth Leonskaja, pianist, Richard Kriesche, artist
- 2007: Herbert W. Franke, scientist, writer, artist; Hans Walter Lack, botanist; Josef Burg, writer; Reginald Vospernik, high school director; Nuria Nono-Schönberg, Lawrence Schönberg, Ronald Schönberg, the three children of Arnold Schoenberg
- 2008: Gerhard Haszprunar, zoologist; Ernst von Glasersfeld, Austro-American constructivist, Michael Ludwig, Michael Kaufmann, manager of German culture; Reinhard Putz, anatomist; Jessye Norman, American soprano; Hannes Androsch, Finance Minister and Vice Chancellor a.D.; Gerald Holton, physicist and historian of science
- 2008: Arvo Pärt, Estonian composer
- 2009: Grita Insam, gallerist; Hans Werner Scheidl, journalist and author; Stefan Größing, sports scientist; Bruno Mamoli, specialist in neurology and psychiatry; Fredmund Malik, management scientist; Theodore Bikel; Hans Werner Sokop, poet and translator
- 2010: Boris Pahor, Slovenian writer
- 2011: Harry Schachter, Canadian Biochemist
- 2012: Hilde Hawlicek, Austrian former government minister
- 2012: Ronny Reich, Israeli Archaeologist
- 2013: Uroš Lajovic, Slovenian conductor; Peter Bogner (art historian), art historian
- 2015: Jan M. Ziolkowski, American medievalist and Latinist
- 2015: Richard Gisser, demographer
- 2016: Bernard Keeffe, conductor, radio and television broadcaster, scriptwriter, BBC producer, Chair and President of Anglo-Austrian Music Society.
- 2017: Julius Rebek Jr., American chemist; Michael Schratz, educational scientist
- 2019: Jeroen Duindam, Dutch historian
- 2020: Franz Schausberger, Austrian politician and historian
- 2021: Jesús Padilla Gálvez, Spanish philosopher
- 2021: August Reinisch, Austrian lawyer

=== Forfeiture ===
Forfeiture of this honour became possible with Federal Law Gazette I No 128/2001, changing Act § 8a. It allows the government to strip recipients of their honours if deemed unworthy. The best known example of such a forfeiture is of the Nazi physician Heinrich Gross.

On 5 August 2008 the Austrian Science Minister Johannes Hahn decided not to withdraw the award from inventor Johann Grander. – see also Wikipedia German version and see also Austrian ministry
