= Peter Bogner =

Peter Bogner may refer to:

- Peter Bogner (businessman) (born 1964), German-American businessman
- Peter Bogner (art historian) (born 1963), Austrian art historian
