= Hans Werner Sokop =

Austrian poet and translator

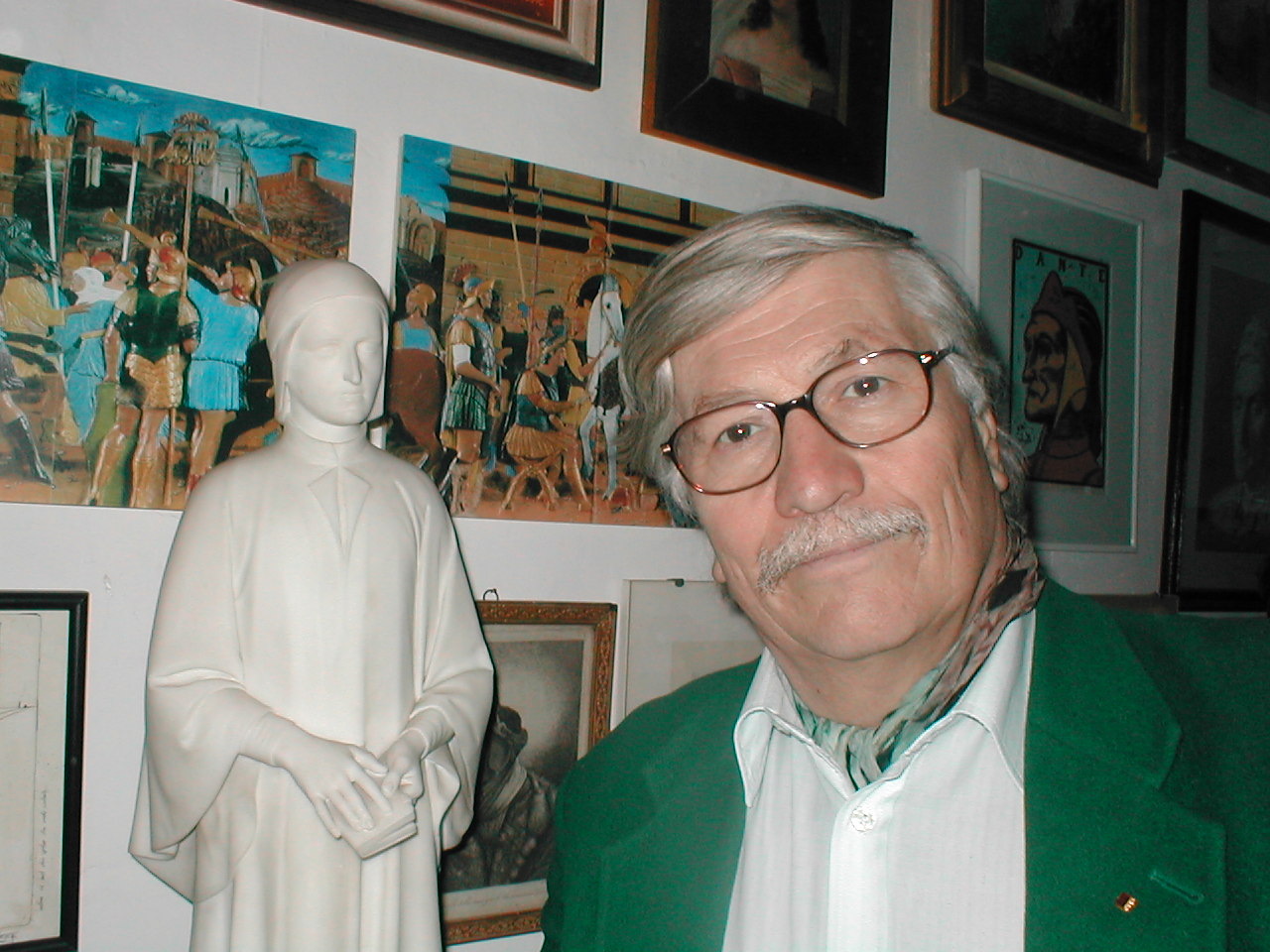
- Hans Werner Sokop next to Giovanni Dupré's statue of Dante Alighieri
- Born: 13 January 1942; Vienna
- Known for: translating the Divine Comedy into German

Hans Werner Sokop (born January 13, 1942) is an Austrian poet and translator. In parallel to his professional career at the municipal administration of Vienna he has published a vast range of publications ranging from various sorts of poems to translations into German and Viennese German. Specifically, he translated the Divine Comedy of Dante Alighieri in two versions in 1983 and 2014, the latter improved, but both retaining Dante's terza rima.

== Life ==
Hans Werner Sokop was born in Vienna on January 13, 1942, the second child of Johann Sokop (1902–1981), a master typewriter mechanic, and Helene, née Parrer (1901–1998), a seamstress. From 1945 to 1950, the family lived in Hallstatt, then in Vienna. From 1952 to 1960, he attended the secondary school in Diefenbachgasse. After passing his school-leaving examination with distinction, he entered the administrative service of the City of Vienna and at the same time began studying law at the University of Vienna. After obtaining his doctorate in law in 1964, he remained in the municipal service and from 1967 worked in Municipal Department 62, which was responsible for elections and various legal matters and of which he was head from 1985 until his retirement in 2002. Hans Werner Sokop is married to the writer Brigitte Sokop, née Nagel (Jene Gräfin Larisch, Stammtafeln europäischer Herrscherhäuser). His son Christian (born 1971) is a painter, author and musician. Together with him, he published two volumes of Viennese and English poems.

His first German poems in the 1960s were characterized by formal rigour. From 1970, he also turned to the Viennese dialect. In addition to numerous volumes of poetry, a Viennese rhyming chronicle 1000 Years of Austria with two-liners for each year was published in 1996, followed by the antique addition Caesar schau oba and Das war alles, was geschah. He translated Wilhelm Busch classics into Viennese (e.g. Max and Moritz, Plisch and Plum, Die fromme Helene) as well as Der Weaner Struwwepeter, Der klane Prinz, Oh, wie schee is Panama and Der Alice ihre Obmteier im Wunderlaund. With his Schönbrunner Spaziergang and his St. Marxer Spaziergang with numerous photos and short poems, Sokop shows his love for Vienna; two island books (Einmal Korsika and Immer wieder nach Brioni) are written in sonnet form.

Sokop is also a master of linguistic games, e. g. in the form of shake rhymes and limericks or as acrostics and elegiac distiches. The Japanese style of haiku, often combined with photographs, is one of his interests. He was an enthusiastic participant in the legendary Profilspiel, in good company with Martin Flossmann, Fritz Eckhardt, Hans Weigel, Ernst Stankovski and Herbert Prikopa.

Trips to Florence and Rome furthered his interest in Italian culture. In 1975, this also led him to Dante Alighieri, whose Divine Comedy he retranslated while retaining the terza rima form, which was praised by Hans Weigel in the foreword. It was published in 1983 as a four-volume cassette. To mark the 750th birthday of Italy's greatest poet, a new edition of the translation was published in 2014 with color illustrations by Fritz Karl Wachtmann, again while retaining Dante's tercines (rhyme scheme ABA BCB CDC DED):

Ich stand in unsres Erdendaseins Mitte
verirrt in einem dunklen Wald alleine;
kein rechter Weg mehr bot sich meinem Schritte.
Das Reden fällt mir schwer, und ich vermeine,
dass jenes wilden Waldes Dornendichte
auch künftig mir als Schreckensbild erscheine:
gleich bitter wie der Tod. — Doch ich berichte
des Guten wegen, das ich aufgenommen,
von anderem, erschienen dem Gesichte.

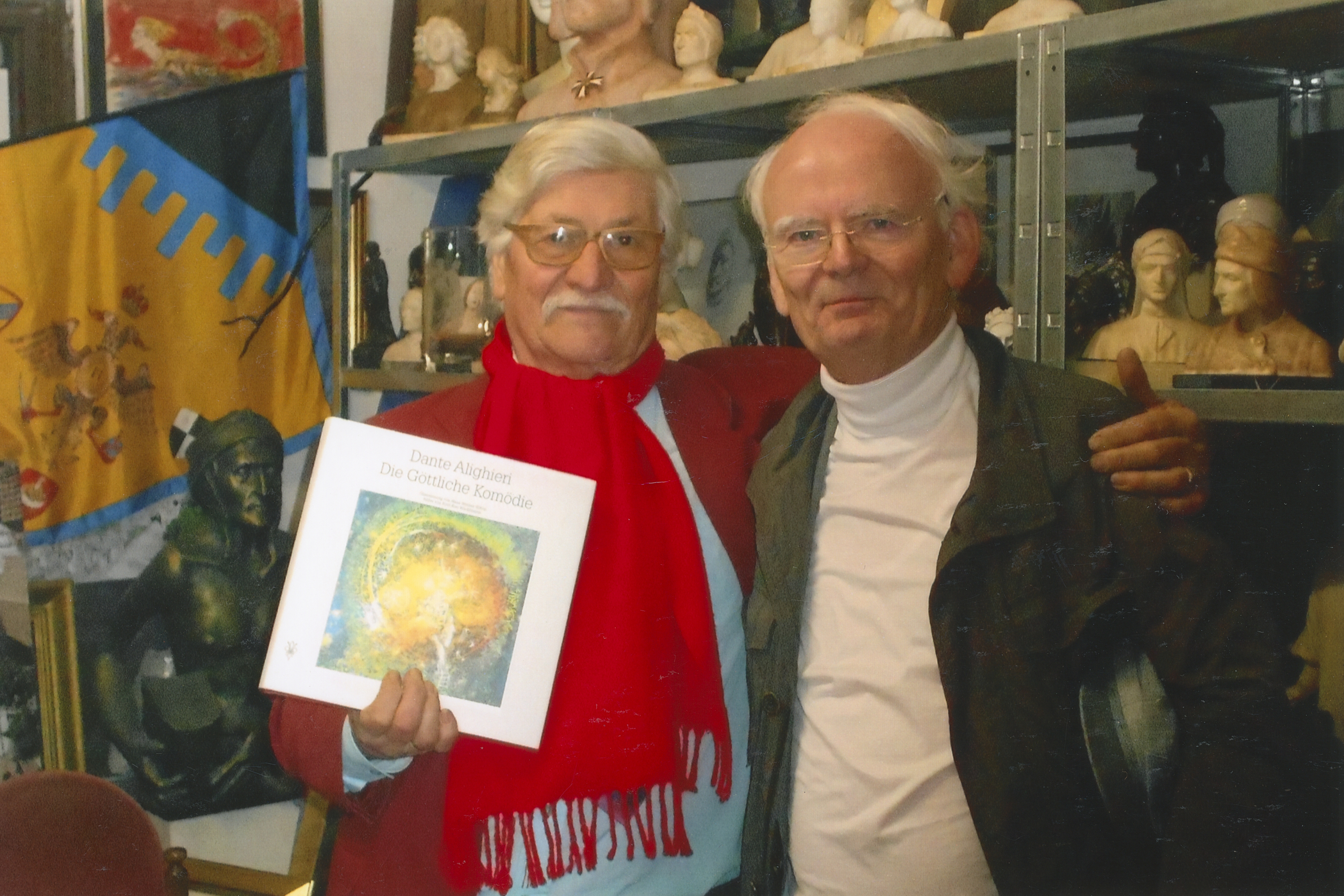
Hans Werner Sokop and the illustrator Fritz Karl Wachtmann

This text was the basis for a production by the Odysseetheater in 2018. Further translations of Italian poems from Dante to Carducci and Jenco followed. With his 36 Dante anecdotes and two songs in Viennese, Sokop presented an additional, cheerful and contemplative approach to the great Florentine:

Hob Ritter gsegn, wauns ausm Loger ruckn,
wüd vierebreschn, schwanzln zu Paradn,
in Schwaf eiziagn, waun sa si verdruckn …
Durch eicher Laund sans gjappet, de Brigadn,
es Aretiner, so wia hinter Hosn.
Turniere hob i gsegn und Kavalkadn
mit Gleckerln oder aa Tompetnblosn,
mit Turmsignale oder Trommelschlogn,
und wos s’ aun Zeichn sunst no steign lossn.
No nie hob i noch so an Urklaungbogn
des Fuaßvoik ziagn gsegn oder aa de Reiter,
ka Schiff daunk Stern und Leichtturm durch de Wogn.
Mit zehn so Teifen plogn ma uns do weiter.
A feine Rass! — In Kirchn si net rihrn,
im Wirtshaus oba mit de Bsoffnan heiter …

On a trip with the Società Dante Alighieri, he met Conte Pieralvise Serego-Alighieri, a 21st generation descendant who runs a winery in Valpolicella that had already been acquired by Dante's son Pietro. He was given a special honor in 2000 when he was allowed to present his translation of the Divine Comedy as part of the Dante events of the city of Ravenna. As a passionate admirer of Dante, Sokop has also collected everything related to Dante's life and work, which over time has resulted in a small Dante museum.

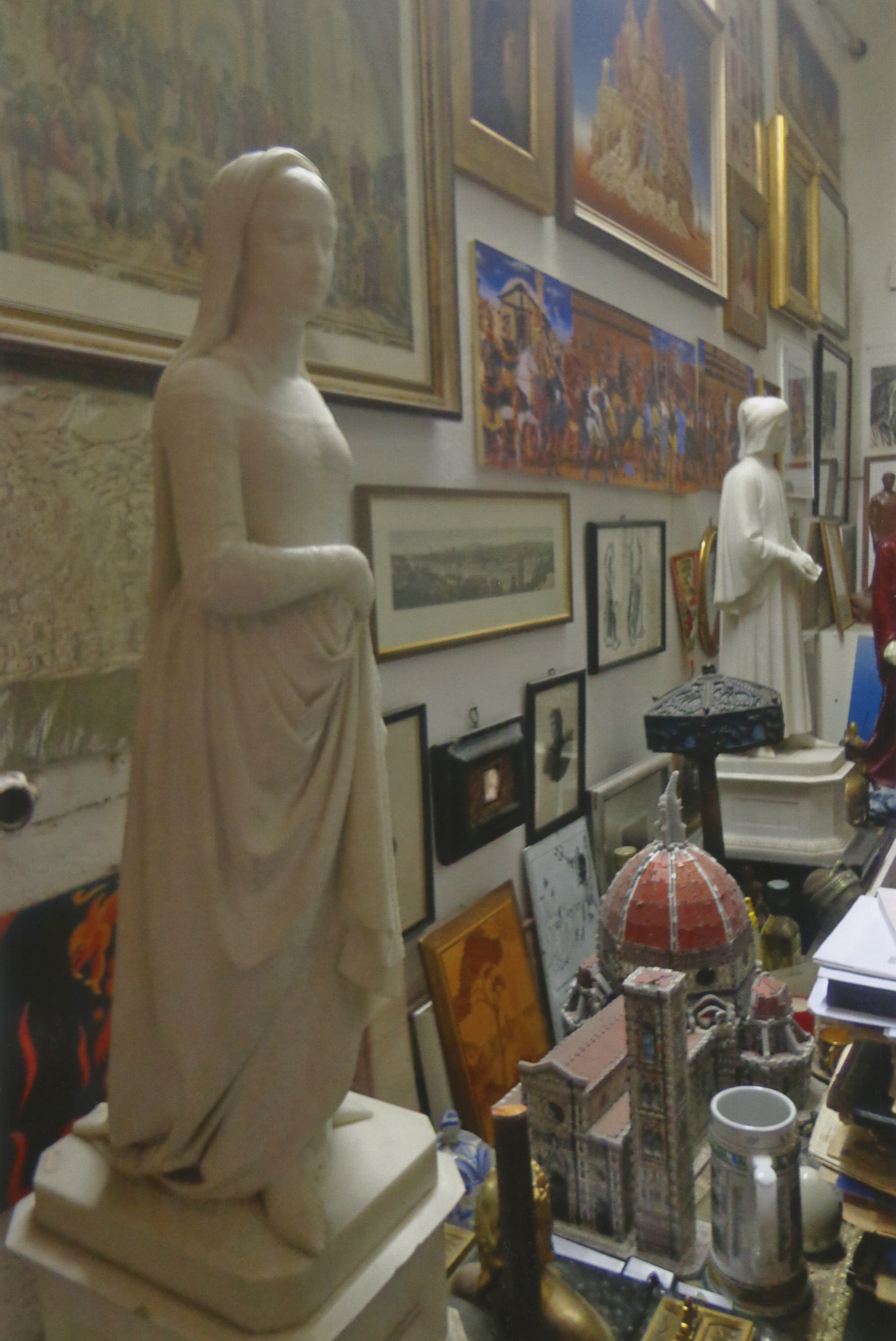
Giovanni Dupré's statues of Beatrice and Dante

In 1990 he presented part of this collection under the title Dante live in Vienna at the Gesellschafts- und Wirtschaftsmuseum. With his video Dante im Amt, Sokop opened up access to Dante for people interested in promoting culture.

His favorite vacation island since 1986, the Brijuni National Park in Istria, led to several books and illustrated books with poems and haikus. On this largely untouched island with limited tourism, there are remains of non-avian dinosaurs and traces of the Illyrians, Romans, Byzantines, Venetians and ancient Austrians, which has provided material for several books. Sokop gives lectures, some with slides from his travels, and gives numerous readings, e. g. every year at the medieval festival in Eggenburg, Lower Austria

== Works ==
=== Poems ===
- Brioni. Gedichte aus Istrien. Wiener Geschützte Werkstätten, 1992
- 36 Dante Anekdoten (und 2 Inferno-Gesänge auf Wienerisch) WGW, 1994
- passages + perspectives. Gedichte zu Bildern von Heinz Richard Berger. Deutsch und Bulgarisch. Verlagshaus AZ, Sofia 1998
- Das war alles, was geschah. Eine Reimchronik von Odoaker (476) bis Ostarrichi (996). Ill. von Stoimen Stoilov. Sofia 2000
- Über Brioni. Gedichte im Haiku-Takt, WGW 2002
- Martin die Hendlgans. Tierepos mit Ill. von Georg Petzer. Vindobona-Verlag, Wien 2005
- Schönbrunner Spaziergang. novum-Verlag, Horitschon 2006
- St. Marxer Spaziergang. novum-Verlag, Neckenmarkt 2007
- Riminiszenzen ─ küstliche Urlaubsgedichte. novum-Verlag, Neckenmarkt 2008
- Immer wieder nach Brioni – Istrianische Sonette. Vindobona, Horitschon 2009
- Einmal Korsika – ein Sonettenkranz. Vindobona 2010
- Doppelte Schüttelreime und 100 einfache zur Göttlichen Komödie Edition scribere & legere im AndreBuch Verlag 2022

=== Poems in Viennese dialect ===
- Wienerisch is aa a Sproch. Verlag Welsermühl, Wels 1979
- Sunst samma gsund. WGW, 1984
- Knoifresch und Safnblosn. Verlag Welsermühl, Wels 1985
- Wiener Woikerln. Verlag Welsermühl, Wels 1991
- 1000 Jahre Österreich. Eine wienerische Reimchronik. ÖVG, Wien 1996
- Cäsar schau oba – das Altertum von Romulus bis Romulus Augustulus. Eine wienerische Reimchronik mit Karikaturen von Georg Petzer. Vindobona-Verlag, Wien 2001
- Wienerisches Adventkalenderbuch, Naumann, Nidderau 2005
- Wienerische Viechereien, Zeichnungen von Leopold Ozegovic, Vindobona 2012
- Sokopoems, Wienerische Gedichte and English Poems, Chris und Hans Werner Sokop, Zwiebelzwerg Verlag Willebadessen, 2018
- Geflügelte Worte – wienerisch weitergspunna mit Zeichnungen von Leopold Ozegovic, Edition scribere & legere im AndreBuch Verlag
- Redensarten aus Wien, Edition scribere & legere im AndreBuch Verlag 2020
- Sokopoems II, Wienerische Gedichte and English Poems, von Chris und Hans Werner Sokop, Zwiebelzwerg Verlag, Willebadessen, 2024

=== Translations ===
- Dante Alighieri: Die göttliche Komödie, deutsche Terzinenfassung (4 Bände). Illustrationen von Franz Scheck, Heinz Richard Berger und Oscar Asboth. Arena 2000, Wien 1983
- Im Schatten der Zypressen. Gedichte aus Italien. WGW, 1986
- Zwei Inferno-Gesänge auf Wienerisch, in: 36 Dante-Anekdoten, WGW, 1994
- Der Weaner Struwwepeter. Naumann, Nidderau 2001
- Die Weihnachtsgeschichte auf wienerisch. Naumann, Nidderau 2001
- Der Heilige Abend, Edition Tintenfaß, Neckarsteinach, 2006
- Lewis Carroll, Der Alice ihre Obmteier im Wunderlaund. Wienerische Ibersetzung, Evertype 2012, Irland
- Dante Alighieri: Die göttliche Komödie, deutsche Terzinenfassung. Bilder von Fritz Karl Wachtmann, Akademische Druck- und Verlagsanstalt Graz, 2014
- Max und Moritz auf Wienerisch, (Ehrenwirth, München 1999), Reclam 2015
- Janosch, Oh, wie schee is Panama, Edition Tintenfaß, Neckarsteinach 2017
- Saint-Exupéry, Der klane Prinz, Edition Tintenfaß, Neckarsteinach, 3. Aufl. 2017

=== Viennese contributions in dialect anthologies ===
- Die Weihnachtsgeschichte in deutschen Dialekten. Hrsg. von Walter Sauer, Druck- und Verlagsgesellschaft, Husum 1993
- Max und Moritz von A bis Z. Hrsg. von Manfred Görlach, Universitäts-Verlag C. Winter, Heidelberg 1995
- Der Mundart Struwwelpeter in 27 deutschen Mundarten. Hrsg. von Walter Sauer, Universitätsverlag C. Winter, Heidelberg, 2. erw.Aufl.2001
- Wilhelm Buschs Hans Huckebein in 65 deutschen Dialekten. Hrsg. von Manfred Görlach, Universitätsverlag C. Winter, Heidelberg 1997
- Wilhelm Buschs Plisch und Plum in 40 deutschen Mundarten. Hrsg. von Manfred Görlach, Universitätsverlag C. Winter, Heidelberg 1999
- Wilhelm Buschs Max und Moritz in neun Dialekten. Hrsg. von Manfred Görlach, Reclam, Stuttgart 2001
- Die besten U-Bahn-Gstanzln, Hrsg. von Roland Neuwirth, Böhlau, Wien 2006
- Max und Moritz mundartgerecht. Dtv 2007

=== Kalender ===
- Das Donautal bei Greifenstein. Kalender 2012, Haiku mit Tuschezeichnungen von Ingrid Schwarz
- Das Kahlenbergerdorf. Kalender 2013, Haiku mit Tuschezeichnungen von Ingrid Schwarz
- Hernals, Kalender 2014, Haiku mit Tuschezeichnungen von Ingrid Schwarz
- Neubau. Kalender 2015, Haiku mit Tuschezeichnungen von Ingrid Schwarz
- Baden bei Wien. Kalender 2016, Haiku mit Tuschezeichnungen von Ingrid Schwarz
- Alsergrund. Kalender 2017 Haiku mit Tuschezeichnungen von Ingrid Schwarz
- Döbling. Kalender 2018 Haiku mit Tuschezeichnungen von Ingrid Schwarz
- Innere Stadt 2019, Haiku mit Tuschezeichnungen von Ingrid Schwarz
- Dante Alighieri, Kalender 2021, zum 700. Nachlebensjahr, Bilder zur Göttlichen Komödie und Schlüsselstellen aus der Übersetzung von Sokop
- Dante Alighieri, Kalender 2022', Nachlese zum 700. Nachlebensjahr, Penzing, Kalender 2023, Haiku mit Tuschezeichnungen von Ingrid Schwarz
- Währing. Kalender 2024, Haiku mit Tuschezeichnungen von Ingrid Schwarz

=== Legal publications ===
- Wiener Wahlrecht. Landes- und Gemeindewahlrecht, bundesverfassungsrechtliche Grundlagen, Bundeswahlrecht und europarechtliche Bestimmungen, Manz, Wien 1995

=== CDs ===
- Die Dante CD 1. Hans Werner Sokop liest aus seinem Buch 36 Dante Anekdoten und zwei Inferno-Gesänge auf Wienerisch, Wien 2003
- Die Dante CD 2. Hans Werner Sokop liest aus seinem Buch Die göttliche Komödie – deutsche Terzinenfassung, Wien 2004
- Wienerische Weihnachtszeit, Weihnachtsevangelium auf Wienerisch und Weihnachtsgedichte, Wien [2008]
- Die Göttliche Komödie in der Übersetzung von Hans Werner Sokop, gelesen von Till Firit, Mono-Verlag, Wien 2015
- Die Wiener Version von Dantes Divina Commedia, gelesen von Martin Ploderer, Wien 2021 (3 CDs)

== Memberships ==
- Deutsche Dante-Gesellschaft
- Società Dante Alighieri, Vienna
- Österreichischer Schriftsteller/innenverband
- Verband Geistig Schaffender und Österreichischer Autoren
- Österreichische Haikugesellschaft

== Awards ==
- 1999: Gold medal of honor of the Società Dante Alighieri, headquarters, Rome, awarded on April 2, 1999
- 2001: Grand Decoration of Honour in Silver, awarded on January 29, 2001
- 2009: Cross of Honour for Science and Art 1st Class, awarded on February 25, 2009

== About Hans Werner Sokop's translation of Dante's Divine Comedy ==
- Esther Ferrier: Deutsche Übertragungen der Divina Commedia Dante Alighieris 1960–1983. Ida und Walter von Wartburg – Benno Geiger — Christa Renate Köhler — Hans Werner Sokop. Vergleichende Analyse Inferno XXXII, Purgatorio VIII, Paradiso XXXIII. Berlin / New York: Walter de Gruyter, 1994. ISSN 0481-3596. 680 Seiten.
