= Hans Weigel =

Austrian writer and theater critic (1908–1991)

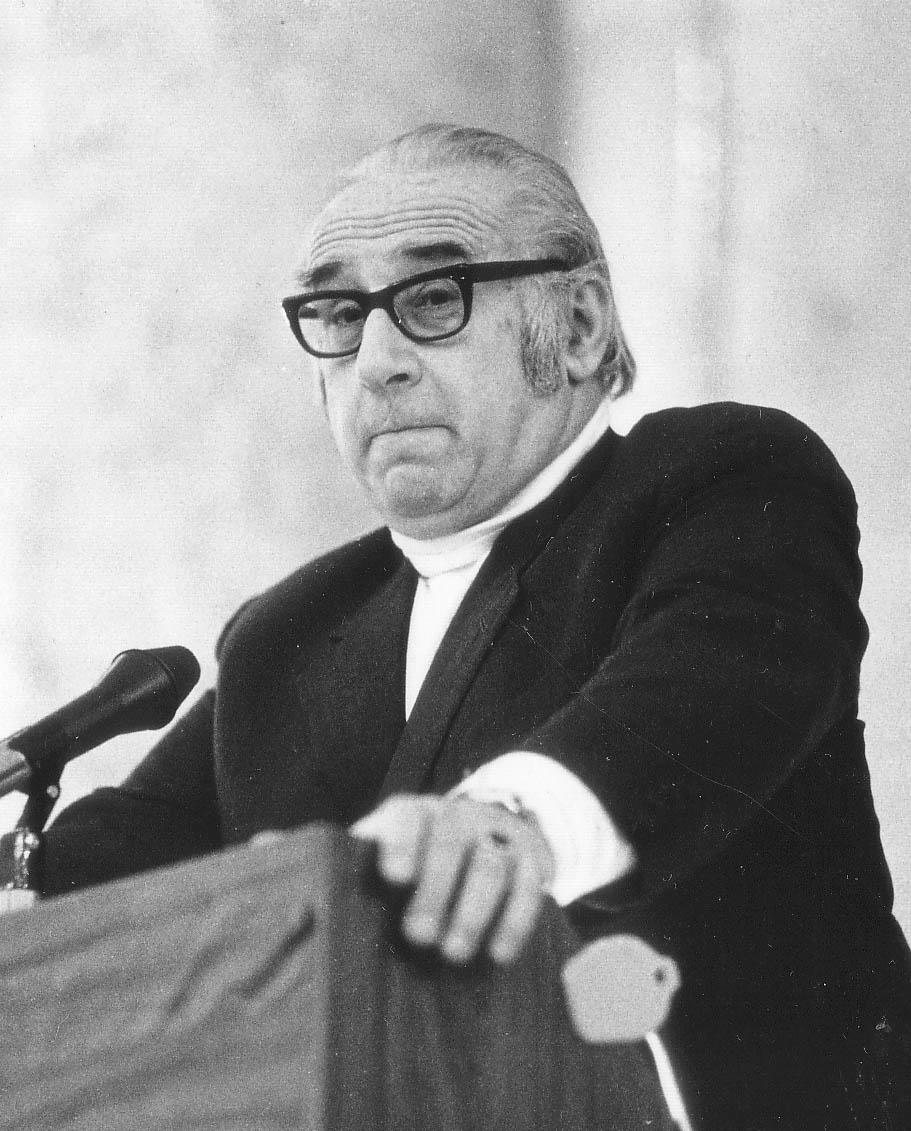
Hans Weigel in Vienna, in 1974.

Julius Hans Weigel (29 May 1908, Vienna – 12 August 1991, Maria Enzersdorf) was an Austrian Jewish writer and a theater critic. He lived in Vienna, except during the period between 1938 and 1945, when he lived in exile in Switzerland. He was a lifetime companion of the Austrian actress Elfriede Ott.

== Biography ==
During the time before the Anschluss of Austria, i.e. the annexation by Nazi Germany in 1938, he worked at Viennese cabaret theaters. After his return from Switzerland, where he lived in exile (1938 – 1945), he wrote critical reviews about theater plays for the Austrian newspapers Kurier and Neues Österreich. Jointly with Friedrich Torberg he was responsible for the boycott in Austrian theaters of Bertolt Brecht whom he rejected because of Brecht's communist convictions.

Between 1951 and 1954, Hans Weigel edited the anthology Stimmen der Gegenwart (Voices from the Present), which fostered young writers. Today, his name is used by the Subsidy for Literature of Lower Austria. Weigel adapted comedies by Johann Nepomuk Nestroy and translated Molière. He collaborated with the annual Nestroy Theater Festival on Burg Liechtenstein, whose art director was Elfriede Ott.

== Awards and accomplishments ==
- 1972: City of Vienna Prize for Journalism
- 1977: Johann Nestroy Ring
- 1982: Ehrenring by the City of Vienna
- Austrian Cross of Honour for Science and Art, 1st class

== Works (selection) ==
- Lern dieses Volk der Hirten kennen. Versuch einer freundlichen Annäherung an die Schweizerische Eidgenossenschaft. Zurich: Artemis 1962
- Karl Kraus oder Die Macht der Ohnmacht. Versuch eines Motivenberichts zur Erhellung eines vielfachen Lebenswerks. Vienna; Frankfurt; Zurich: Molden, 1968
- Die Leiden der jungen Wörter. Ein Antiwörterbuch. Zurich, Munich: Artemis-Verlag, 1974, ISBN 3-7608-0357-1
- Flucht vor der Größe. Graz, Wien, Köln (Verlag Styria), 1978, illustriert von Hans Fronius, ISBN 3-222-11092-1
- Das Land der Deutschen mit der Seele suchend, Diogenes Verlag, Zurich 1983, ISBN 3-257-21092-2
- Niemandsland. Ein autobiographischer Roman. Ed. by Elfriede Ott and Veronika Silberbauer. Vienna: Amalthea, 2006, ISBN 978-3-85002-571-3
