= Simon Hatzl =

Austrian actor

- Born: Eibiswald
- Citizenship: Austria
- Education: Max-Reinhardt-Seminar
- Occupations: TV, fim and stage actor

Simon Hatzl is an Austrian TV, fim and stage actor.

== Life ==
Born in Eibiswald, he studied at the Max-Reinhardt-Seminar in Vienna and graduated in 1998. He has appeared as part of the Vienna's Theater der Jugend (Youth Theatre) as well as in Kommissar Rex and Mein Mörder. He was nominated for a Nestroy in 2001 for his appearance in Bester Nachwuchs.

== Filmography ==
=== Film ===
- 1998: Wie eine schwarze Möwe
- 2003: Wolfzeit
- 2004: Mein Mörder
- 2004: Shadow of the Sword – Der Henker
- 2006: Fallen
- 2007: Freigesprochen
- 2008: Das große Glück sozusagen
- 2008: Der erste Tag (TV film)
- 2009: Rimini
- 2010: Meine Tochter nicht (TV film)
- 2010: The Unintentional Kidnapping of Mrs. Elfriede Ott
- 2010: Mahler on the Couch
- 2010: Anatomy of Evil (TV film)
- 2011: Das Wunder von Kärnten (TV film)
- 2012: Europas letzter Sommer (TV film)
- 2013: Nicht ohne meinen Enkel (TV film)
- 2013: Die Werkstürmer
- 2014: CopStories
- 2014: Sarajevo
- 2014: Gruber geht
- 2015: Die Toten vom Bodensee – Familiengeheimnis (TV film)
- 2015: Landkrimi – Wenn du wüsstest, wie schön es hier ist
- 2016: Agonie
- 2016: Pokerface – Oma zockt sie alle ab
- since 2016: Die Toten von Salzburg (TV series)
  - 2016: Die Toten von Salzburg
  - 2018: Zeugenmord
  - 2018: Königsmord
  - 2019: Mordwasser
  - 2019: Wolf im Schafspelz
- 2017: Tatort – Wehrlos
- 2018: Landkrimi – Achterbahn
- 2018: Landkrimi – Grenzland
- 2019: Wilsberg – Minus 196°
- 2019: Unter anderen Umständen – Im finstern Tal
- 2019: Vienna Blood
- 2020: The Trouble with Being Born

=== TV ===
- 2001: Kommissar Rex (episode 7x07 Besessen)
- 2002: Medicopter 117 – Jedes Leben zählt (2 episodes)
- 2002: Dolce Vita & Co (episode 2x02 Die Prüfung)
- 2003–2020: SOKO Kitzbühel (6 episodes)
- 2004: Tatort – Tod unter der Orgel
- 2005: Die Patriarchin (episode 1x01 I)
- 2005: Schloss Orth (episode 9x08 Einbrüche)
- 2006: 8x45 – Austria Mystery (episode 1x03 Das Eis bricht)
- 2005–2016: SOKO Wien (4 episodes)
- 2006: Der Winzerkönig (3 episodes)
- 2007: Vier Frauen und ein Todesfall (episode 2x02 Rattengift)
- 2012: Die Bergretter (episode 3x03 Steinschlag)
- 2012–2014: Schnell ermittelt (2 episodes)
- 2013: Janus (episode 1x02)
- 2014: Die Detektive (episode 1x07)
- 2014: Universum History (documentary series, 1 episode)
