= The Dark Valley =

2014 film

- Film poster
- Directed by: Andreas Prochaska
- Screenplay by: Martin Ambrosch; Andreas Prochaska
- Based on: Das finstere Tal by Thomas Willmann
- Produced by: Stefan Arndt; Helmut Grasser
- Starring: Sam Riley
- Cinematography: Thomas W. Kiennast
- Edited by: Daniel Prochaska
- Music by: Matthias Weber
- Production companies: X-Filme Creative Pool; Allegro Film; SanFilm Produktion; Zweites Deutsches Fernsehen; Österreichischer Rundfunk
- Distributed by: Filmladen (Austria); X Verleih AG (though Warner Bros.) (Germany)
- Release dates: 10 February 2014 (Berlin); 14 February 2014 (Austria)
- Running time: 115 minutes
- Countries: Austria; Germany
- Languages: German; English

The Dark Valley (German: Das finstere Tal) is a 2014 Austrian-German Western drama film directed by Andreas Prochaska, based on Thomas Willmann's eponymous 2010 novel. The film stars Sam Riley as a lone traveler who ends up in a small town in the Alps, finding corruption and tyranny running rampant. It was selected as the Austrian entry for the Best Foreign Language Film at the 87th Academy Awards, but was not nominated.

== Plot ==
The film opens with a scene of a scared young man and woman hiding in the basement of a wooden building. Footsteps are heard from above, and then several men find them, severely assaulting the man and then dragging them both away as the woman screams.

Sometime later, a young stranger rides into a remote town somewhere in the Austrian Alps. Having introduced himself as a photographer, Mr Greider, he becomes the lodger of a widow whose husband and son suffered an untimely death. Soon, the newcomer learns that the entire town is firmly under the dominion of an aged rich man named Old Brenner and his six power-drunk sons. One day, the widow sends her daughter to town to run some errands. Greider is invited and decides to accompany young Luzi. As Luzi does her shopping, Greider asks for coffee and horseshoe nails. The brothers discover him at her side within the store, and command him to drink their schnapps. When he politely refuses by stating that he "doesn't drink," one of the brothers beats him into compliance. Later, one of the Brenner brothers dies in what looks like a freak logging accident. Soon this same fate befalls another of the brothers; he falls off a cliff having been blinded by a branch with nails on it. Old Brenner finds nails in his dead son's eyes. Since Greider is suspected to have had his hand in these accidents, he hides.

Meanwhile, it is revealed that the Brenners walk in the footsteps of their father. At every local wedding they claim the (fictional) medieval prerogative of Primae noctis; only Greider's parents (the young couple from the opening scene) had refused to comply. For that defiance, the Brenners crucified Greider's father, but his mother managed to escape and find refuge in America. The local priest still supports what the Brenners do. Greider confronts the priest in private, revealing that he's come to crack down on the Brenners. He admits that he did kill the two Brenner sons. After telling the priest that he's next to die, Greider shoots him.

Greider rescues Luzi from the grasp of the Brenners after she marries Lukas and is abducted. Greider challenges them to a duel on the next day. Rather than waiting for the appointed duel, the brothers try to ambush Greider at the remote mountain cabin where he is holed up. At dawn they come after him, attacking all together. A shootout ensues. Greider is outnumbered four-to-one, but he has the advantage of a Winchester lever-action repeating rifle, while the Brenners all wield two shot side-by-side and breechloading rifles and are unfamiliar with a repeating rifle. Skillfully leveraging this edge, Greider kills or leaves for dead the remaining four brothers. He then seeks to deliver the message of their deaths to their father, but discovers that some citizens of the town remain loyal to Brenner senior.

As Greider approaches Brenner's home he is attacked by the blacksmith, a hulking giant brandishing a large iron log hook. Lukas manages to save Greider by shooting the blacksmith, but not before the hook finds its way through Grieder's shoulder. After the fight, Greider storms Old Brenner's house and finds him in his bed. Greider gives Old Brenner a picture of his mother, explaining the reason for killing Old Brenner's sons and now him. Old Brenner reveals to Greider that he is Greider's father (a product of his mother's rape by Brenner on her wedding night) and so therefore he has murdered his own half-brothers. Knowing he will die, Brenner asks him "to make it quick" and Greider obliges by shooting him in the heart. Greider recovers for three weeks from his wounds. Meanwhile, the various families that live on the valley ask to punish Greider as many have relatives to Old Brenner due to his ways and still being subjected to conservative belief that "rulers are always right" but they are too weak-willed to fight him plus he can easily kill them. With his vengeance fulfilled and realizing how hopeless the townsfolks are, Greider silently leaves the valley, never to return.

== Cast ==
- Sam Riley as Greider
- Tobias Moretti as Hans Brenner
- Paula Beer as Luzi
- Thomas Schubert as Lukas
- Helmuth A. Hausler as Hubert Brenner
- Martin Leutgeb as Otto Brenner
- Johann Nikolussi as Rudolf Brenner
- Clemens Schick as Luis Brenner
- Florian Brückner as Edi Brenner
- Hans-Michael Rehberg as Brenner
- Erwin Steinhauer as Pfarrer Breiser
- Beatrix Brunschko as Lukas' mother
- Gerhard Liebmann as Lukas' father
- Franz Xaver Brückner as Franz
- Xenia Assenza as Maria

== Reception ==
On the review aggregator website Rotten Tomatoes, 33% of 6 critics' reviews are positive.

== See also ==
- List of submissions to the 87th Academy Awards for Best Foreign Language Film
- List of Austrian submissions for the Academy Award for Best Foreign Language Film
