= Andreas Prochaska =

Austrian film director and editor (born 1964)

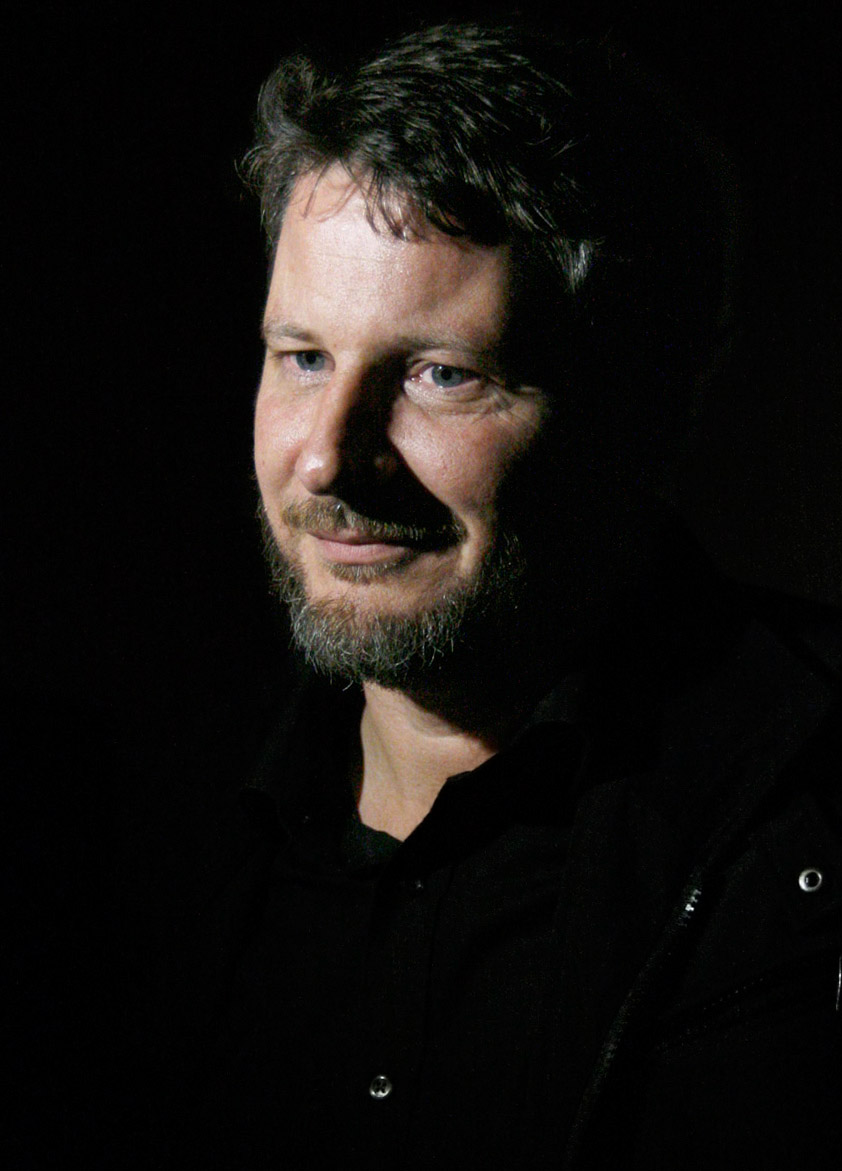
- Born: 31 December 1964 (age 61); Vienna, Austria
- Occupation: Film director
- Years active: 1998–present

Andreas Prochaska (born 31 December 1964) is an Austrian film director and editor. He directed the 2014 film The Dark Valley, the 2017 miniseries Maximilian and Marie of Bourgogne, and the 2018 series Das Boot, among others. He has contributed to more than thirty films since 1998.

Prochaska is the director of the TV series Alex Rider, based on the teen spy novel series of books by Anthony Horowitz.

== Selected filmography ==
Director
Year	Title	Notes
2006	Dead in 3 Days	
2010	The Unintentional Kidnapping of Mrs. Elfriede Ott	
2010–2021	Anatomy of Evil (TV series)	9 episodes
2011	A Day for a Miracle	
2014	The Dark Valley	
2014	Sarajevo (TV film)	
2017	Maximilian and Marie de Bourgogne (TV miniseries)	
2018	Das Boot (TV series)	
2020	Alex Rider (TV series)	
2025	Welcome Home Baby	feature; BIFF Panorama 2025
