= Sarajevo (2014 film) =

- Written by: Martin Ambrosch; Kurt Mündl
- Directed by: Andreas Prochaska

Production
- Running time: 98 minutes

Original release
- Release: April 28, 2014

Sarajevo is a 2014 German-Austrian biographical television film that depicts the assassination of Archduke Franz Ferdinand of Austria.

== Plot ==
On 28 June 1914, the Austro-Hungarian heir presumptive Archduke Franz Ferdinand of Austria-Este and his wife Sophie, Duchess of Hohenberg are travelling through Sarajevo on the 525th anniversary of the Battle of Kosovo. Following an attack on the Archduke's life, the Austrian examining magistrate Leo Pfeffer is tasked with capturing the person responsible. Whilst interrogating the assassin, Pfeffer finds out there has been a second attack on the Archduke and his spouse, in which both were killed. Bosnian Serb assassin Gavrilo Princip is then arrested for his part in the second attack. The magistrate learns that only 36 policemen had been available for patrolling the route the Archduke was travelling on.

After the first attack, the convoy heads towards the hospital, but an apparent false turn leads to the second attack, where the second attacker was located. All of this causes doubts in Pfeffer's mind. Whilst being tortured, one of the perpetrators confesses, and then evidence and witnesses disappear. In the process of his investigations, Pfeffer encounters further inconsistencies, but is forced by his superiors to state the assassination as a conspiracy by Serbia. As Pfeffer submits his final report, Austro-Hungarian politicians and the military have already decided that the assassination of the Archduke would be used as a pretext for an invasion of Serbia.

== Cast ==
- Florian Teichtmeister as Leo Pfeffer
- Reinhard Forcher as Archduke Franz Ferdinand of Austria
- Michaela Ehrenstein as Sophie, Duchess of Hohenberg
- Eugen Knecht as Gavrilo Princip
- Mateusz Dopieralski as Nedeljko Čabrinović
- Erwin Steinhauer as Oskar Potiorek
- Heino Ferch as Dr. Herbert Sattler
- Melika Foroutan as Marija Jeftanovic
- Edin Hasanović as Danilo Ilić
- Simon Hatzl as Polizeichef Strametz
- Martin Leutgeb as Polizist Schimpf
- Juraj Kukura as Stojan Jeftanovic
- Karin Lischka as Frau Ofner
- Juergen Maurer as Justizchef Fiedler
- Michael Menzel as Sekretär Körner
- Friedrich von Thun as Sektionsrat Wiesner
- Dominik Warta as Peter Dörre

== Production ==
The film is a German-Austrian cooperation between German television channel ZDF and Austrian channel ORF. It was commissioned as part of the 100th anniversary of the start of the First World War.

== Awards and nominations ==
The film received the following awards and nominations:

- Baden-Baden TV Film Festival 2014
  - 3Sat Zuschauerpreis: Andreas Prochaska
- German Television Academy Award 2014
  - Best Leading Actor: Florian Teichmeister
  - Best Script: Martin Ambrosch
  - Best Casting: Nicole Schmied
- Jupiter Award 2015
  - Best German TV Actor: Heino Ferch

== Reviews ==
" An oppressive storyline" - TV Spielfilm

"The ZDF / ORF co-production defies the assassination attempt of Sarajevo, whose sequence and its consequences are generally known, yet still of value compared to a documentary on the topic" - tittelbach.tv

The Hollywood Reporter called it a "handsome-looking and well-acted feature"
