= Edmund Engelman =

Jewish Austrian American photographer (1907–2000)

- Born: May 21, 1907; Vienna, Austria
- Died: April 11, 2000 (aged 92); New York City, U.S.
- Education: TU Wien
- Known for: Photography
- Notable work: Freud Photographs
- Spouse: Irene Lipnowska Engelman
- Awards: Carey-Thomas Award; Austrian Decoration for Science and Art

Edmund Engelman (1907–2000) was a Jewish Austrian (Viennese), and later American, photographer and engineer who became famous for photographing the home and workplace of Sigmund Freud at Berggasse 19 in Vienna, shortly before the Freud family escaped Austria for England in 1938.

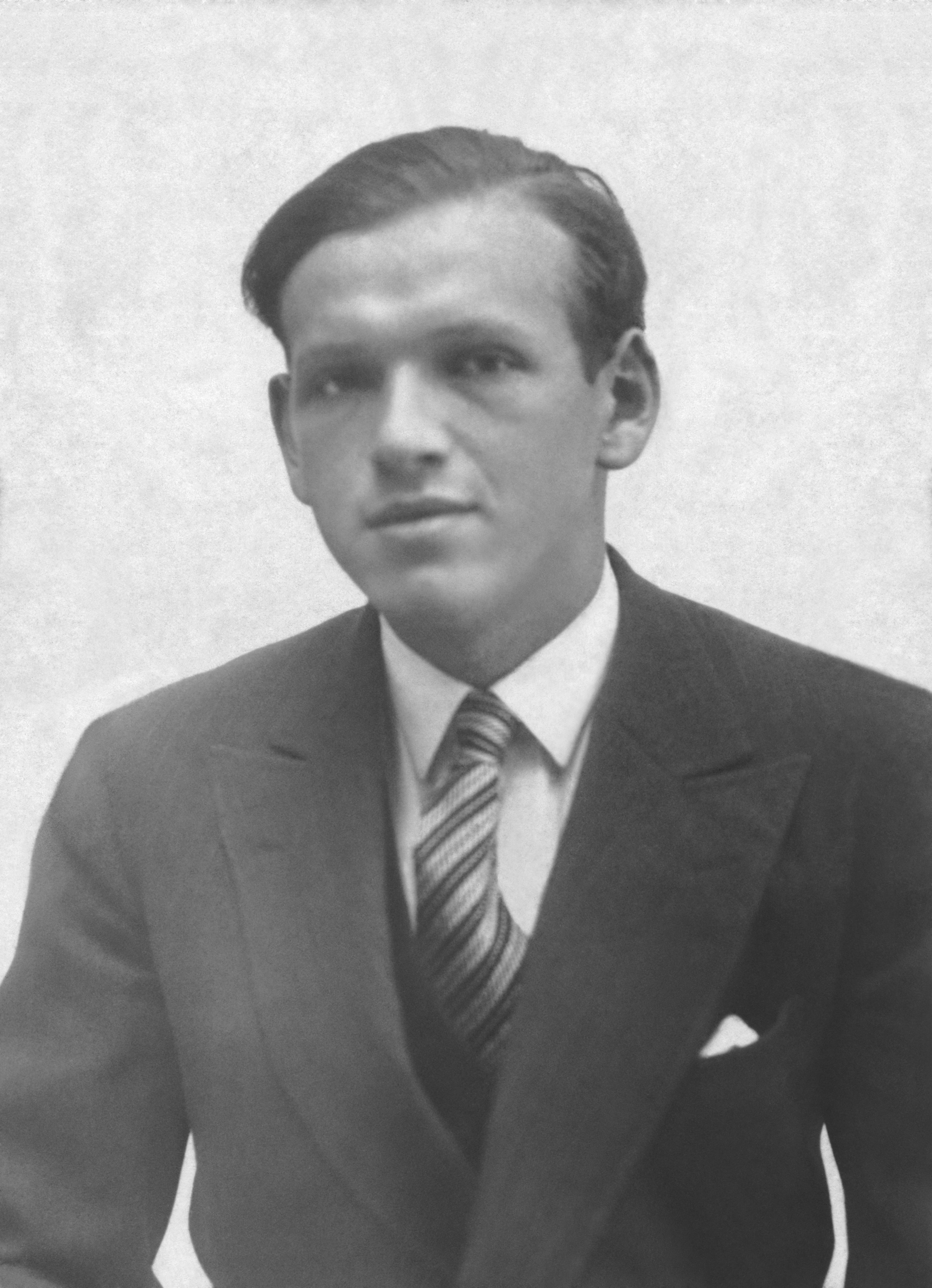
Edmund Engelman, 1930

== Life and career ==
=== Early life and education ===
Edmund Engelman's parents were Jews from the Austro-Hungarian province of Galicia who had moved to Vienna, where he was born on May 21, 1907. He grew up in the Brigittenau district of Vienna, which had historically been part of Leopoldstadt, in the northern corner of the former Jewish ghetto.

As a child, he exhibited a strong interest in technology and science. At the age of ten he built his own lens-less camera, and subsequently received one of Austria's first licenses for a ham radio receiver. He graduated from the Real-Gymnasium Leopoldstadt (today's Sigmund Freud Gymnasium), the same high school Freud had attended half a century earlier. He subsequently studied at Vienna's prestigious Technische Hochschule (now Vienna University of Technology) from 1927 to 1931, receiving a degree in mechanical and electrical engineering. In this period he was one of a handful of Jews to attend the school, which otherwise was a hotbed of nationalist and Pan German activism. His studies included classes in chemistry, photography and cinematography that would prove to be important in his subsequent career.

=== Foto City ===
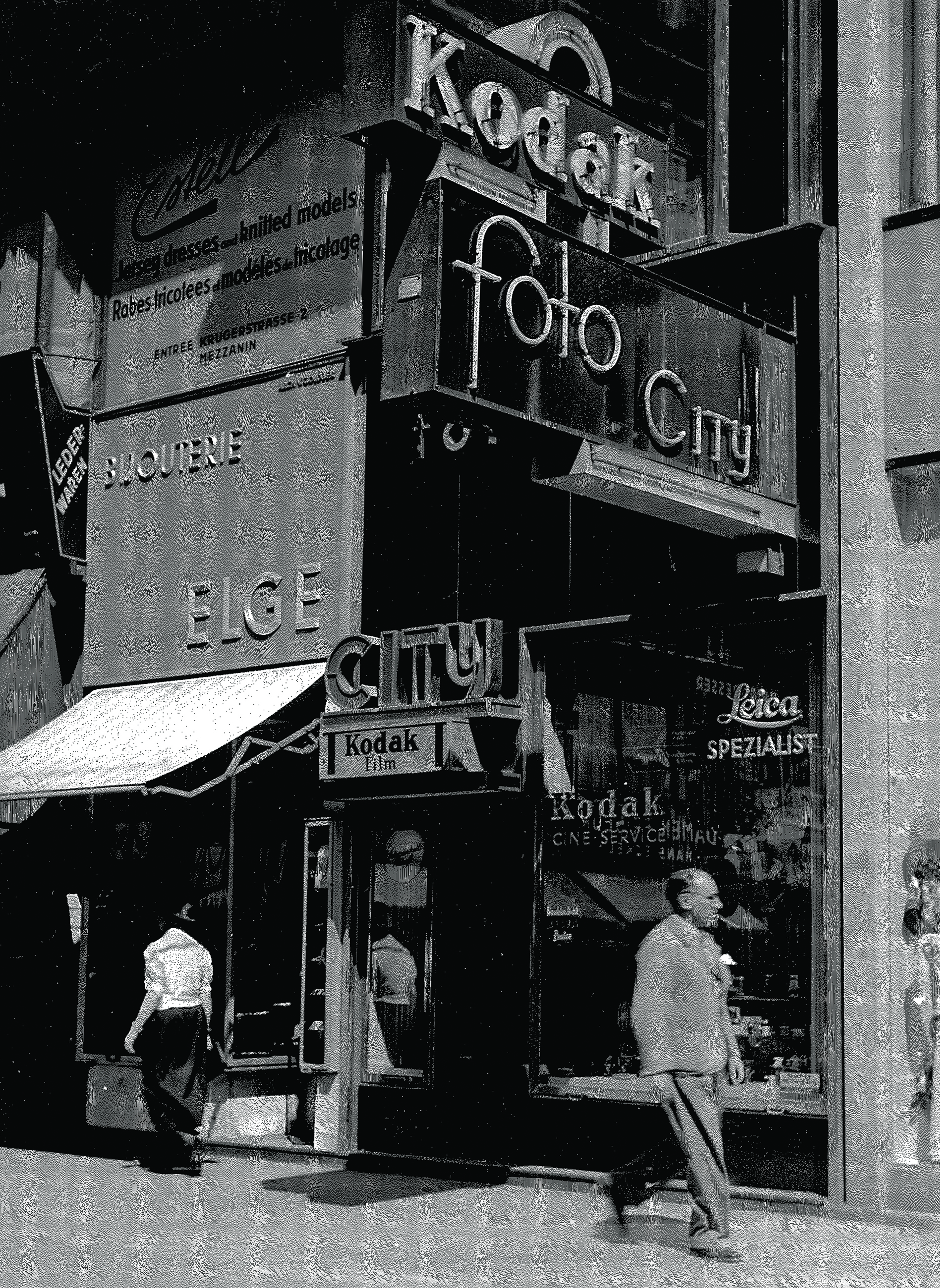
Picture of Foto City, Edmund Engelman, c. 1935

In 1932, Engelman founded Foto City, a photography store and studio at 45 Kärntner Straße, Vienna's leading commercial avenue, near the Opera. Foto City became Austria's preeminent center for photographic equipment and experimentation and amateur cinematography. Its clientele included prominent government officials, diplomats and entertainers as well as pioneering photographers and filmmakers and included members of the Hapsburg family, Austria's chancellor Kurt Schuschnigg, opera singer Richard Tauber, Marlene Dietrich and Leni Riefenstahl. The French filmmaker François Reichenbach purchased his first movie camera at Foto City.

Engelman explored innovative use of photography in the arts and sciences. He served as technical director for the play "Lights, Camera…Action!" ("Achtung...Grossaufnahme"), directed by Martin Magner starring Felix Bressart and Herbert Berghof at Vienna's Kammerspiele Theater in 1936. Engelman filmed the audience as it entered the theater, quickly processing the film and incorporating the footage into the play after the intermission. He also served from 1932 until 1938 as an advisor for the educational use of photography in the anatomical institute of the medical school of the University of Vienna.

=== Persecution by the Nazis and exile ===
Engelman was a member of the Social Democratic Party of Austria, which led the February Uprising of 1934 against the clerical-fascist government of Chancellor Engelbert Dollfuss. Following the suppression of the uprising, Engelman photographed the devastation by heavy artillery of the landmark socialist housing project Karl Marx Hof, where the rebels were barricaded. The photographs documented bombed-out apartments and homeless women and children. After the Anschluss in March 1938, he destroyed the negatives, which he feared would be "incriminating evidence" if discovered by the Nazis. Following the Anschluss incorporating Austria into Nazi Germany Foto City was "Aryanized" in May 1938, with a non-Jewish man named Alfred Baier appointed as official administrator. The document confirming the expropriation of the business was signed by Ernst Kaltenbrunner, chief of the Reich Security Main Office (RSHA), which included the Gestapo. Engelman was arrested under suspicion of stealing Leica cameras from his store, but subsequently released.

During the anti-Jewish pogrom of Kristallnacht in November 1938, Engelman learned that SS officers were looking for him. He first hid in the apartments of friends and then in a hospital, where he underwent elective surgery. Engelman applied for a visa at the American consulate and was placed on a waiting list. He bribed a consular official to obtain a Bolivian visa and booked a liner from Marseilles to Bolivia, enabling him to get a four-week transit visa in France. He left Vienna for France on January 1, 1939, where he was joined by his Polish fiancé, Irena Lipnowska, who had a student visa for the United States. They stayed in Nice for nine months, bribed local officials to get extensions on his transit visa, until September 1939, when Engelman finally received his visa for the U.S. While in Nice, he supported himself by selling some photographic equipment and giving photography lessons.

After the outbreak of war on September 1, 1939, Engelman was briefly held in a detention camp near Bordeaux as an enemy alien. Engelman and his fiancé made multiple attempts to get tickets on liners traveling to the U.S., finally booking passage on the Italian S.S. Conte di Savoia, which left from Genoa on September 15 and arrived on September 23, 1939, in New York City.

=== New York ===
In New York, Engelman worked from 1940 to 1946 on war-related projects as an aeronautical engineer for International Telephone and Telegraph (ITT). He developed electronic equipment for combat planes, resulting in several patents assigned to the company, including an alternator failure warning system that became a standard fixture for all aircraft.

Beginning in 1944, he was a member of the Society of Photographic Scientists and Engineers. After the war, from 1946 to 1958, he was the co-owner of the camera store Midway Camera Exchange in Manhattan. He subsequently worked as a consulting engineer developing photographic processing equipment, with a specialty in electrolytic silver recovery from spent photographic chemicals, for which he received a patent in 1970.

At the end of WW II, Engelman regained ownership of Foto City in Vienna. However, he was nonetheless required by an Austrian court to pay Mr. Baier for his duties as "caretaker" of the enterprise during the war. "The judge was a Nazi," Engelman later observed, "he helped other Nazis — there was nothing I could do." Engelman eventually sold Foto City to his former Austrian employee and business partner, Kommerzialrat Franz Denner.

In 1998, the Austrian Government awarded Engelman the Austrian Decoration for Science and Art, First-Class.

Engelman died on April 11, 2000, at the age of 92. His widow, Irene Lipnowska Engelman, a psychiatric social worker, died in 2017.

Engelman and his wife had two sons—Ralph, a journalism professor at LIU Brooklyn, and Thomas, a youth commissioner in Needham, Massachusetts—and three grandchildren.

== Sigmund Freud photographs ==
Following harassment by Nazi authorities, including a break-in in his home and the detention of his daughter Anna, Freud received permission in May 1938 to leave Austria through diplomatic intervention and payment of a "fugitive tax." Freud's associate August Aichhorn met with Engelman at the Café Museum on Karlsplatz to propose that as Freud's family prepared to emigrate to London, the photographer take pictures of Freud's working and living quarters which had been located at Berggasse 19 since 1891.

In 1933 Engelman had met Aichhorn, a fellow Social Democrat with whom he shared political and cultural interests. Aichhorn was a member of Freud's inner circle, a lay analyst and the author of the groundbreaking book Wayward Youth (1925). He specialized in the psychological problems of children and founded a treatment center for juvenile delinquents. Aichhorn wanted the photographs of Berggasse 19 to record for posterity the birthplace of psychoanalysis. At the same time, as Aichhorn later indicated in a letter to Austrian psychoanalyst Kurt R. Eissler, he intended that Engelman's photographs would, in a post-Nazi era, provide a blueprint for the creation of a Freud Museum in the Berggasse building.

Aichhorn warned Engelman that some danger was involved, and asked that no flash equipment be used that might draw attention, since Freud's apartment was under continuous surveillance by the Gestapo. Aichhorn drew up a floor plan, and asked Engelman to proceed with the understanding that the elderly and ill Freud would not be disturbed. Over a four-day period, in May 1938, Engelman—inch-by-inch, wall-by-wall—took a total of 106 images, 76 taken with a Leica camera, 30 with a Rolleiflex. Engelman sought to take pictures from Freud's perspective: "I wanted to see things the way Freud saw them, with his own eyes, during the long hours of his treatment sessions and as he sat writing." The images ranged from the outside of the building bedecked with swastika flags and the door with Freud's office hours to the treatment room containing the famed couch, from Freud's vast collection of thousands of antiquities to the family's more spartan private quarters, including Anna's room with a large portrait of her father over her bed. We see Freud working at his desk on his last book, Moses and Monotheism, as well as the examination room where Freud received treatment for oral cancer. On the third day, Engelman unexpectedly encountered Freud, who agreed to pose for pictures. Engelman also took portraits of Freud's wife and their daughter Anna. In addition, he took photographs of all three to be used for their passports. Engelman gave Freud an album made up of a selection of photographs he had taken. Freud, in turn, signed an enlarged portrait for the photographer with the inscription, "Herzlichen Dank dem Kunstler—Freud" ("Heartfelt Thanks to the Artist—Freud").

When Engelman departed from Vienna for France on January 1, 1939, he left the Freud negatives with August Aichhorn. After the war, he sought to locate Aichhorn, only to learn that he had died in 1949. After his death Aichhorn's former secretary had sent the negatives to Anna Freud.

In 1952, Engelman traveled to Anna Freud at 20 Maresfield Gardens in London, where she returned the negatives to him. Engelman was given a tour of the Freud residence, where Sigmund Freud had died in 1939. "I was moved," Engelman later recalled, "to see once more the beautiful pieces of art and furniture which I had last seen under such different circumstances."

As Engelman created a new life in the U.S., he gave little thought to his photographs of Berggasse 19. He later explained, "The fact that the Austrians showed so little interest in Freud was probably the reason I did not expect great interest for him in the USA, and so my negatives just sat in my desk for years." Individual photographs, usually of Freud's couch, occasionally appeared accompanying articles on psychoanalysis in the press or in textbooks and biographies of Freud.

Wider appreciation of the historical and cultural significance of the body of photographs as a whole was prompted by an exhibit in September and October 1973 of fifty-nine photographs in large format at Guild Hall, in East Hampton, New York, where Engelman had a summer residence. As noted in a lengthy review in The New York Times, many of the photographs had never been seen before. The exhibit was said to have "reverberated worldwide," as the Gallery Association of New York State circulated the show to museums, galleries and analytical societies throughout the U.S. and Europe.

1974 the Jewish Museum in New York mounted an exhibit of Engelman's photographs with emphasis on what they revealed about Freud's vast collection of archeological artifacts. Entitled "Berggasse 19: The Office and Antiquities of Dr. Sigmund Freud," the show was curated by the psychoanalyst and author Rita M. Ransohoff. Also in 1974, Gene Friedman directed a short documentary, "Sigmund Freud: His Offices and Home, Vienna, 1938," narrated by Eli Wallach and featuring interviews with Engelman.

Growing interest prompted by the museum exhibits led to a comprehensive publication of Engelman's photographs in book form. In 1976, Basic Books, at the instigation of its president and publisher, Erwin A. Glikes, published "Berggasse 19: Sigmund Freud's Home and Offices, Vienna 1938". The large-format book contained 54 photographs, detailed captions for each image by Rita M. Ransohoff, a memoir by Engelman, and an essay by the cultural historian Peter Gay. Gay wrote of the photographs:

"They help to fill out a puzzle from which too many pieces are missing. They let us walk through Freud's rooms, sit at his desk, and contemplate, almost through his eyes, the objects he collected and cherished. By themselves these photographs are like a manifest dream: rare and fascinating raw material requiring interpretation."

The book received the Carey-Thomas Award from Publishers Weekly for "a distinguished project of book publishing". German and French editions of the Basic Books edition of Berggasse 19 followed. Beginning in 1993, new editions were issued under the auspices of the Freud Museum in Vienna with an introduction by Inge Scholz-Strasser, director of the Freud Museum in Vienna, which replaced the essay by Peter Gay and the notes of Rita Ransohoff.

Engelman's pictures are prominently displayed at the Freud Museum in Vienna, which was only established in 1971. Almost all of the contents captured in the photographs—the famous couch, other furniture, books, pictures and the large collection of antiquities—remains in England's Freud Museum, located in Freud's final residence in London. Professor Diana Fuss has written that

"The photographs of Berggasse 19, originally taken for the postwar construction of a Freud museum, have themselves become the museum, miniature sites of preservation and display."

The photographs, following their wider dissemination in exhibits and book form, have enabled scholars to deepen knowledge of the relationship between archeology and psychoanalysis and other elements of Freud's thought. "Although generally regarded for their documentary quality," Dr. Arnold Werner emphasized,

"Engelman's photographs also have artistic merit. They evoke a lost era and culture and have wonderful composition, a savvy blending of natural light sources, and a great tonal range."
