= Elfriede Ott =

Austrian actress, singer, stage director, and instructor (1925–2019)

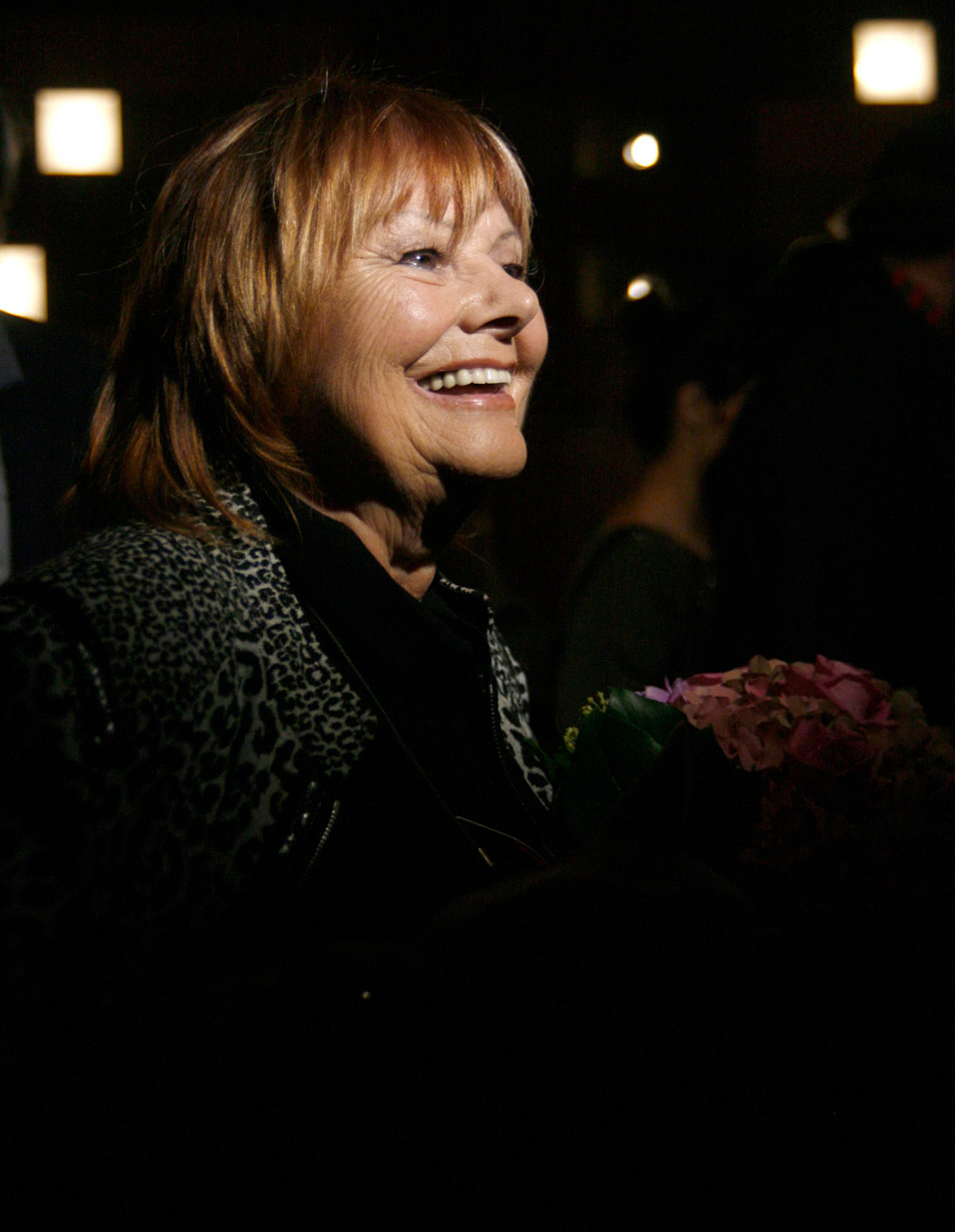
- Born: 11 June 1925; Vienna, Austria
- Died: 12 June 2019 (aged 94)
- Occupation(s): Actress, singer, stage director, instructor
- Spouses: Ernst Waldbrunn; Hans Weigel
- Awards: Grand Decoration of Honour in Silver for Services to the Republic of Austria

Elfriede Ott (11 June 1925 – 12 June 2019) was an Austrian actress, singer, stage director and instructor. She was born in Vienna, and was married twice; first to Ernst Waldbrunn, and second to Hans Weigel. She was originally educated as watchmaker, in order to take over her father's workshop. She made her stage debut at the Vienna Burgtheater in 1944, which was the start of a long career in theatre. She also occasionally played in operettes and in numerous television productions, and she had assignments as stage director. From 1985 to 2004 she gave theatre lectures at the Music and Arts University of the City of Vienna. Ott received several awards, including the Grand Decoration of Honour in Silver for Services to the Republic of Austria, as well as the titles Kammerschauspielerin and Professor.

== See also ==
- The Unintentional Kidnapping of Mrs. Elfriede Ott
