= Jesús Padilla Gálvez =

Spanish philosopher (born 1959)

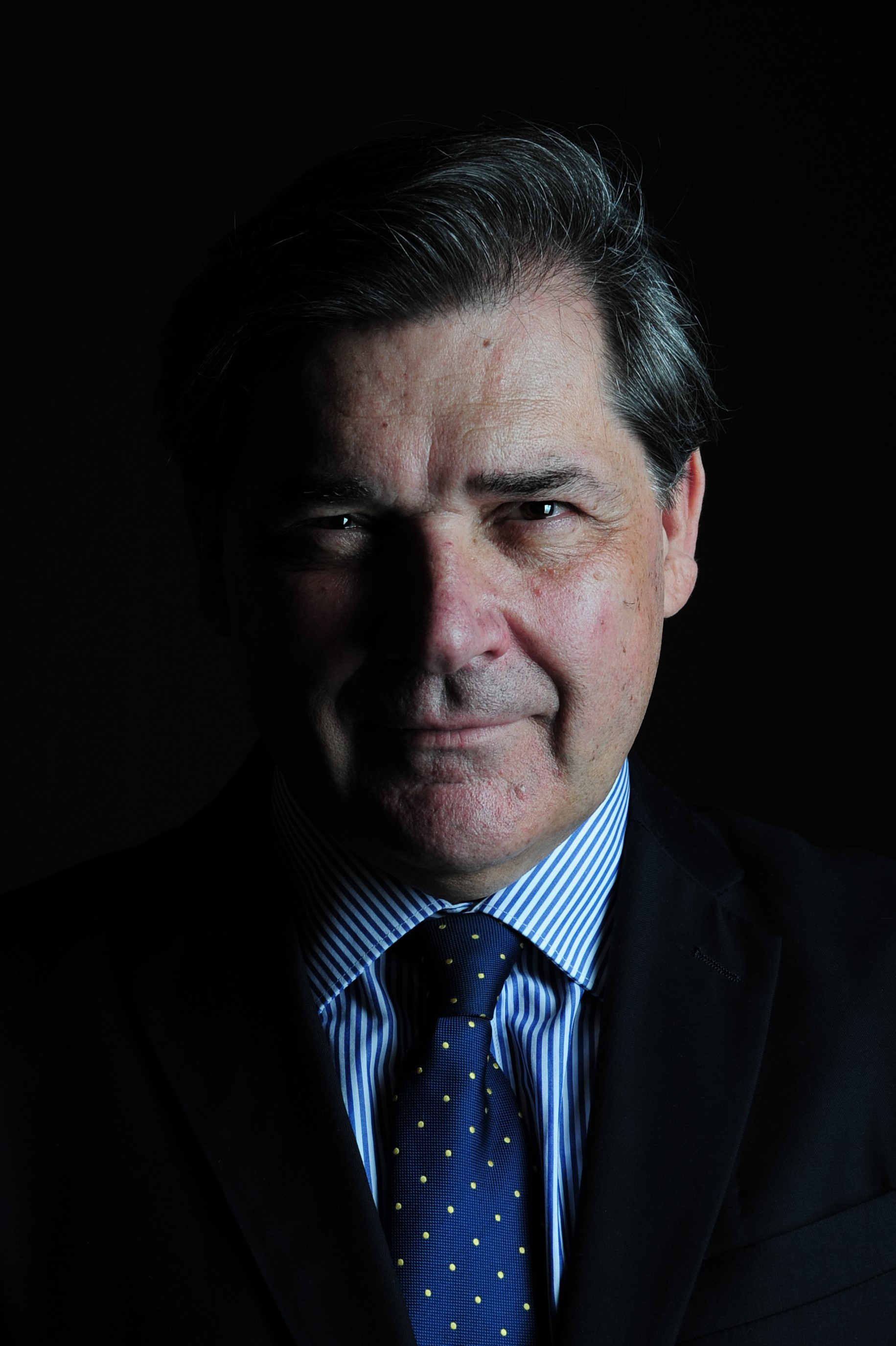
- Jesús Padilla Gálvez
- Born: October 28, 1959; Almería, Spain
- Awards: Austrian Cross of Honour for Science and Art 1st Class; Alexander von Humboldt Research Award

Education
- Education: University of Cologne (MA, Dr.phil.)
- Thesis: Referenz und Theorie der möglichen Welten (1988)
- Doctoral advisor: Lothar Eley, Albert Zimmermann

Philosophical work
- Era: Contemporary philosophy
- Region: Western philosophy
- School: Continental philosophy; Phenomenology; Analytic; Critical rationalism
- Main interests: Logic, ontology, epistemology, philosophy of language, philosophy of mathematics, philosophy of science, ethics.

Jesús Padilla Gálvez (Spanish: [xeˈsus paˈðiʎa ˈɣalβeθ]; born October 28, 1959) is a Spanish philosopher who has worked primarily in philosophy of language, logic, and the history of sciences.

== Professional biography ==
Jesús Padilla Gálvez studied Philosophy, History and Mathematics at the University of Cologne (Germany) and was awarded the M.A. in 1983 and a Dr. phil. in Philosophy in 1988. He was Research Assistant (1988–1991) at the University of Murcia (Spain) and later held the post of Associate Professor (1992–1994) for Logic and Philosophy of Language at the University of León (Spain). From 1994 to 1999 he was Visiting Professor at the Johannes Kepler University in Linz (Austria). Since 1999 he has been Professor at the University of Castilla-La Mancha in Toledo (Spain). He has held visiting posts at the Universities of University of Erlangen-Nuremberg (Germany), University of Graz (Austria), University of Potsdam (Germany), University of Cambridge (United Kingdom), LMU Munich (Germany), University of Vienna and the University of Oxford (United Kingdom). As director of the international scientific journal Dókos. Revista Filosófica - Philosophical Review (published in Ápeiron Ediciones (Madrid) and editor of the international series "Aporia / Aπορία" (De Gruyter) the author is continuously engaged with highly relevant philosophical topics.

== Philosophical views ==
In his doctoral thesis, Padilla Gálvez examined central issues of analytic philosophy. His subsequent investigations are characterized by an application of the analytic method to the study of philosophical problems. This method involves both, the analysis of language to eliminate ambiguity as well as a profound scrutiny of the logical form of philosophical propositions. Padilla Galvez's work may be classified into five lines of investigation: philosophy of language, logic, philosophy of history of science, social changes in democratic systems and language for specific purposes (LSP). He was dealing with the works of Gottfried Leibniz, Immanuel Kant, Edmund Husserl, Alfred Tarski, Ludwig Wittgenstein, Willard Van Orman Quine, Saul Kripke, among others. Padilla Gálvez is recognized as one of the leading experts of Ludwig Wittgenstein's philosophy in the English and Spanish-speaking world.

He has published extensively in the field by focusing on logic-grammatical analysis of language. This includes such topics as history of logic and mathematics (Kurt Gödel), action, decision-making, forms of life, anthropology, language, aesthetics, politics (democracy and terrorism) and practical philosophy.

== Awards and recognition ==
- Austrian Cross of Honour for Science and Art, 1st class (2020)

== Bibliography ==
He is the author of

- "Referenz und Theorie der möglichen Welten". Peter Lang Verlag, Frankfurt a. M., 1989.(ISBN 3-631-40780-7)
- "Tratado metateórico de las teorías científicas". Ediciones de la Universidad de Castilla-La Mancha, Cuenca, 2000. (ISBN 84-8427-078-5)
- "Sozioökonomische Einführung in die Interkulturalität". (Publicado con Margit Gaffal) Oldenbourg, München, 2005. (ISBN 3-486-57869-3)
- "Verdad y demostración". Plaza y Valdés, Madrid, México D.F., 2007. (ISBN 978-84-96780-19-4) Reseña en: Revista Latinoamericana de filosofía
- "Wittgenstein I. Lecturas tractarianas". Plaza y Valdés, Madrid, México D.F., 2009. (ISBN 978-84-96780-18-7)
- "Yo, máscara y reflexión. estudios sobre la autorreferencia de la subjetividad". Plaza y Valdés, Madrid, México D.F., 2012. (ISBN 978-84-15271-51-2)
- "Hacia la representación perspicua. Wittgenstein 2". Tirant Humanidades, Valencia, 2014. (ISBN 978-84-16062-28-7)
- "Parménides, Sobre la naturaleza, El desarrollo de una gramática metafísica". Ápeiron Ediciones, Madrid, 2015. (ISBN 978-84-944709-0-5).
- "Verdad. Controversias abiertas". Tirant Humanidades, Valencia, 2017. (ISBN 978-84-17069-58-2).
- "Estado de cosas. Reconstrucción de la polémica sobre el Sachverhalt". Tirant Humanidades, Valencia, 2018. (ISBN 978-84-17508-19-7).
- "El mentiroso. Genealogía de una paradoja sobre verdad y autorreferencia". Tirant Humanidades, Valencia, 2021. (ISBN 978-84-18656-18-7).
- "State of Affairs. Reconstructing the Controversy over Sachverhalt". Philosophia Verlag, Múnich, 2021. (ISBN 978-3-88405-131-3) Review in: Bulletin d'Analyse Phénoménologique, XIX 4 (2023), 24-30.
- "Negociación. Teoría de juegos, juegos de lenguaje y formas de vida". (coedit. with Margit Gaffal) Tirant Humanidades, Valencia, 2023, 204 págs. (ISBN 978-84-19632-23-4).
- "Dynamics of Rational Negotiation: Game Theory, Language Games and Forms of Life". (coed. with Margit Gaffal) Springer, 2024, (ISBN 978-3-031-49050-7).

=== Editor ===
- "El Círculo de Viena, reconsiderado". Arbor, 1996, Nr. 612, Tomo CLV, pp. 7– 147. (ISSN 0210-1963)(1996)
- "Wittgenstein y el Círculo de Viena / Wittgenstein und der Wiener Kreis". Ediciones de la Universidad de Castilla-La Mancha, Cuenca, 1998. (ISBN 84-89958-26-2)
- "Wittgenstein, from a New Point of View". Peter Lang, Frankfurt a. M., 2003. (ISBN 3-631-50623-6)
- "El laberinto del lenguaje: Wittgenstein y la filosofía analítica / The Labyrinth of Language: Ludwig Wittgenstein and the Analytic Philosophy". Ediciones de la Universidad de Castilla-La Mancha, Cuenca, 2007. (ISBN 84-8427-282-6)
- "Idealismus und Sprachanalytische Philosophie". Peter Lang Verlag, Frankfurt a.M., 2007. (ISBN 84-8427-402-0)
- "Phenomenology as Grammar". Ontos Verlag, Frankfurt a. M., Paris, Lancaster, New Brunswick, 2008. (ISBN 978-3-938793-91-6)
- "Igualdad en el derecho y la moral". Plaza y Valdés, Madrid, México D.F., 2009. (ISBN 978-84-92751-25-9)
- "Philosophical Anthropology. Wittgenstein's Perspective". Ontos Verlag, Frankfurt a. M., Paris, Lancaster, New Brunswick, 2010. (ISBN 978-3-86838-067-5) Review: "Notre Dame Philosophical Reviews"
- "Wittgenstein: Issues and Debates". (with Eric Lemaire). Ontos Verlag, Frankfurt a. M., Paris, Lancaster, New Brunswick, 2010. (ISBN 978-3-86838-083-5) Review: Derek A. McDougall, Critical notice, British Wittgenstein Society
- "Antropología filosófica de Wittgenstein. Reflexionando con P.M.S. Hacker". Plaza y Valdés, Madrid - México, 2011. (ISBN 978-84-92751-95-2)
- "Forms of Life and Language Games". (with Margit Gaffal). Ontos Verlag, Frankfurt a. M., Paris, Lancaster, New Brunswick, 2011. (ISBN 978-3-86838-122-1)
- "Fenomenologia como Gramática". Editora Universidade de Brasília, Brasília D.F., 2011. (ISBN 978-85-230-1294-6)
- "Doubtful Certainties. Language-Games, Forms of Life, Relativism". (with Margit Gaffal). Ontos Verlag, Frankfurt a. M., Paris, Lancaster, New Brunswick, 2012. (ISBN 978-3-86838-171-9)
- "Formas de vida y juegos de lenguaje". Coedición con Margit Gaffal, Plaza y Valdés, Madrid - México 2013, 266 pp., ISBN 978-84-15271-75-8.
- "Action, Decision-Making and Forms of Life". (Ed. Jesús Padilla Gálvez). De Gruyter, Berlin - Boston, 2016, 168 pp., ISBN 978-3-11-047288-2.
- "Intentionality and Action". (Eds. Jesús Padilla Gálvez and Margit Gaffal). De Gruyter, Berlin - Boston, 2017, 180 pp., ISBN 978-3-11-056028-2.
- "Human Understanding as Problem". (Eds. Jesús Padilla Gálvez and Margit Gaffal). De Gruyter, Berlin - Boston, 2018, 165 pp., ISBN 978-3-11-061120-5.
- "Ontological Commitment Revisited". (Ed. Jesús Padilla Gálvez). De Gruyter, Berlin - Boston, 2021, 170 pp., ISBN 978-3-11-074999-1.
- "The Many Faces of Language Games". (Eds. Jesús Padilla Gálvez and Margit Gaffal) De Gruyter, Berlin, Boston, 2024. 183 pp. ISBN 9783111575353.

=== Translations ===
- 1995. Metalógica / Metalogik. Mathesis, XI, Nr. 2, 113-136 / 137–192. (ISSN 0185-6200)
- 2007. Sobre consistencia y completitud en el sistema axiomático. Discusión sobre la ponencia del Sr. Gödel. Protocolo del 15 de enero de 1931. Mathesis III 21 (2007) 193–196. (ISSN 0185-6200)
- 2011. Ludwig Wittgenstein, Nur die Erfahrung des gegewärtigen augenblickes hat Realität’... / Sólo la experiencia del momento actual es real’..., Hat es Sinn zu sagen "zwei Menschen hätten denselben Körper?... / ¿Tiene sentido decir que dos personas tienen el mismo cuerpo?....Dokos. Revista filosófica, Vols. 7-8, 2011, 53-72 (ISSN 1889-0202 - ISSN 1989-2020)
- 2012. Ludwig Wittgenstein, Die normale Ausdrucksweise «Ich habe Zahnschmerzen» / El modo usual de la expresión «tengo dolor de muelas». Dokos. Revista filosófica, Vols. 9-10, 2012, 79-105 (ISSN 1889-0202 - ISSN 1989-2020)
- 2014. Ludwig Wittgenstein, Escrito a máquina [The big typescript] [TS 213]. Transl., introduc. and critical notes from Jesús Padilla Gálvez. Editorial Trotta, Madrid, 2014, 692 p. ISBN 978-84-9879-559-2.
- 2016. Ludwig Wittgenstein, Tratado lógico-filosófico / Logisch-philosophische Abhandlung. Ed. from TS 204, Transl., introduc. and critical notes from Jesús Padilla Gálvez. Tirant Humanidades, Valencia, 2016, 250 p. ISBN 978-84-16349-91-3.
- 2017. Ludwig Wittgenstein, Investigaciones Filosóficas. Transl., introduc. and critical notes from Jesús Padilla Gálvez. Editorial Trotta, Madrid, 2017. 329 págs. ISBN 978-84-9879-674-2.
- 2017. Ludwig Wittgenstein, Diktat für Schlick - Dictado para Schlick. Transl., introduc. and critical notes from Jesús Padilla Gálvez and Margit Gaffal. Ápeiron Ediciones, Madrid, 2017. ISBN 841718242X, ISBN 978-8417182427.
- 2019. Ludwig Wittgenstein, Tratado lógico-filosófico / Logisch-philosophische Abhandlung. 2nd Ed. from TS 204, Transl., introduc. and critical notes from Jesús Padilla Gálvez. Tirant Humanidades, Valencia, 2019, 258 p. ISBN 978-84-17508-58-6.
- 2021. Ludwig Wittgenstein, Investigaciones Filosóficas, Philosophische Untersuchungen. Transl., introd. and notes from Jesús Padilla Gálvez. 2nd. Editorial Trotta, Madrid, 2021. ISBN 978-84-1364-020-4.
- 2025. Ludwig Wittgenstein, Tractatus lógico-philosophicus. Transl., introduc. and critical notes from Jesús Padilla Gálvez. Tirant Humanidades, Valencia, 2025, 174 p. ISBN 978-84-1183-894-8.

and of numerous articles in Diálogos, Grazer Philosophische Studien, Journal for General Philosophy of Science, Logos, Mathesis, Modern Logic, Philosophia Naturalis, Philosophisches Jahrbuch, Wittgenstein-Studien, Zeitschrift für Philosophische Forschung and other journals and collections.
