= Brecht boycott in Vienna =

Boycott in Cold War Vienna

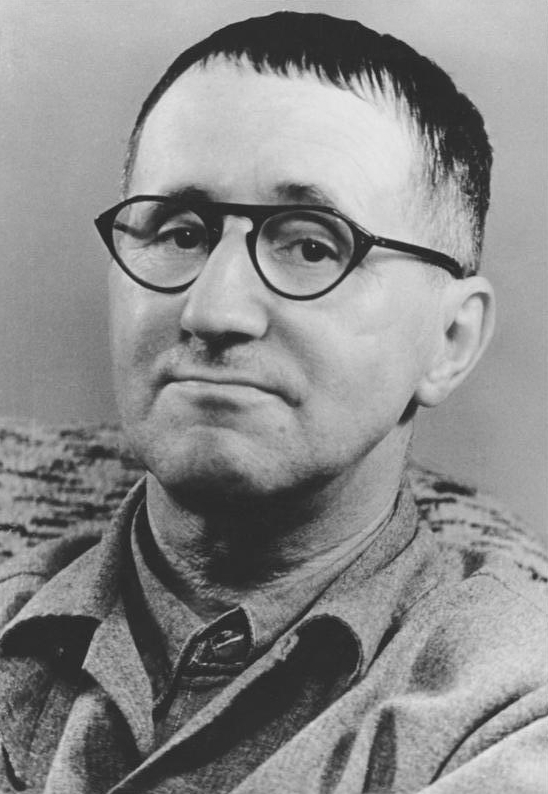
Bertolt Brecht (1948)

As part of an anti-communist campaign in Austria against the author Bertolt Brecht, his work was boycotted for ten years. Between 1953 and 1963, no established Viennese theater performed his works. The initiators were the publicists Hans Weigel and Friedrich Torberg as well as the Burgtheater director Ernst Haeussermann.

== Brecht's citizenship ==
Brecht's plays were rarely performed in Vienna in the 1920s and 1930s, and even immediately after the Second World War there were only occasional productions of his dramas. In 1946, for example, The Good Person of Sezuan was performed with Paula Wessely and Albin Skoda at the Theater in der Josefstadt; Rudolf Steinboeck was the director. In 1948, Leopold Lindtberg directed Mother Courage and Her Children at Vienna's La Scala with Therese Giehse in the title role and in 1952, the Volkstheater staged The Threepenny Opera with Hans Putz and Inge Konradi.

Brecht was stateless after the National Socialists revoked his German citizenship in 1935. A scandal ensued when, on the recommendation of the composer Gottfried von Einem, who was a member of the directorate of the Salzburg Festival, he was granted Austrian citizenship in Salzburg on April 12, 1950. The Austrian public, however, was not informed and when it became known through an indiscretion in the fall of 1951, a storm of protest ensued. Brecht had been living in East Berlin since 1948 and was considered a sympathizer of the East-German Communist regime.

The leading theaters, above all the Vienna Burgtheater and the Theater in der Josefstadt, henceforth refused to play Brecht. Gottfried von Einem was expelled from the Festival Board at the instigation of Josef Klaus, governor of Salzburg, for "undermining the Festival." At a meeting of the Salzburg Festival Board of Trustees on October 31, 1951, Klaus insulted von Einem as a "disgrace to Austria" and a "liar" and demanded his immediate dismissal.

Headlines included "Cultural Bolshevik Atomic Bomb Dropped on Austria" (Salzburger Nachrichten) and "Who Smuggled the Communist Horse into German Rome?" (Die Neue Front). Other newspapers spoke of the "devil's poet," the "literary spawn," and "the greatest cultural scandal of the Second Republic." Brecht was now discredited in Austria's official cultural scene, and a collaboration with the Salzburg Festival failed, although Brecht had been envisaged by Gottfried von Einem to lead a "renewal of the Festival" and had been planning a "counter-Jedermann" for the Festival since 1949.

== Torberg and Weigel ==
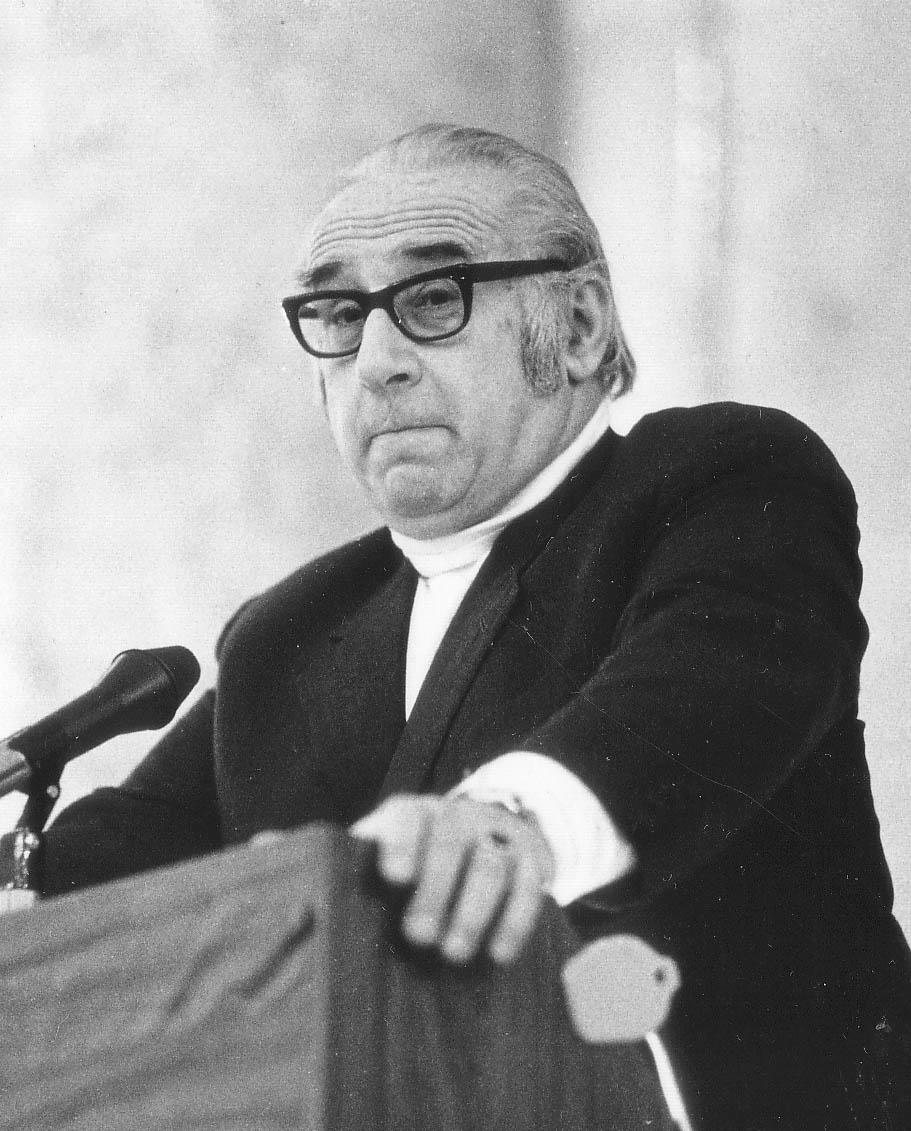
Hans Weigel lecturing in the Vienna Hofburg on the occasion of the 1974 Book Week.

In the climate of the Cold War, a polemical media campaign had raged against Brecht's work and person, making it almost impossible for Viennese theaters to perform his plays. They were dismissed as propaganda for the Eastern Bloc. Brecht's dismissive attitude toward the June 17, 1953 uprising in the GDR, whose violent suppression by Soviet troops he apparently approved of, strengthened the front of his Western opposition. In mid-1953, Brecht declared his solidarity with the SED in a letter to Walter Ulbricht and Otto Grotewohl and sanctioned its measures.

In 1954, Hans Weigel and Friedrich Torberg launched a campaign against Brecht performances in Vienna. In the political-literary magazine FORVM (whose sponsor at the time was the CIA field organization Congrès pour la Liberté de la Culture).

After a performance of Brecht's "Mother Courage and Her Children" at the Graz Opera House on May 30, 1958, FORVM offered thirteen Brecht opponents a platform under the title "Should Brecht be Played in the West?" Hans Weigel demanded that theaters must avoid Brecht and Friedrich Torberg argued vehemently against "softening" the anti-Communist front.

The theater magazine "Die Bühne" joined in the anti-Brecht campaign by printing the refusals of theater directors Franz Stoß and Ernst Haeussermann to play Brecht.

Günther Nenning, on the other hand, advocated a performance of Brecht's works in FORVM despite certain misgivings.

The few voices that opposed the boycott, such as Friedrich Heer, were denounced as "crypto-communists." In return, Heer called Hans Weigel a "little McCarthy," which earned him a conviction for libel.

== The New Theater at La Scala ==
Only the New Theater at La Scala, an ensemble of returned émigrés and committed anti-fascists (many of them communists), located in the Soviet occupation sector of Vienna, devoted itself to Brecht's plays. In 1953, under the artistic direction of Bertolt Brecht himself, Manfred Wekwerth staged Die Mutter with Helene Weigel, Ernst Busch, and Otto Tausig, a re-staging of the Berliner Ensemble's production from January 1951. Shortly before the premiere, the Theaterfreunde, Scala's audience organization, organized another Brecht evening in which the choir of Brown-Boveri, a Soviet-administered company, sang songs composed by Hanns Eisler. However, "Scala" was boycotted by the press and became a battle site in the cultural Cold War in Austria.

Torberg and Weigel accused Scala of staging allegedly "communist tendency plays". The actors were dubbed "communist agents" by Hans Weigel.

When the Communist Party stopped financial support for La Scala after the withdrawal of the Soviet occupying powers, the theater had to close in 1956. Karl Paryla played the title role in Brecht's Life of Galileo one last time at La Scala in 1956. Paryla, his wife Hortense Raky, the Scala director Wolfgang Heinz, and the actress Erika Pelikowsky then found a new artistic home at Brecht's own theater in Berlin, the Berliner Ensemble, as there were no more engagements for them in Austria.

== Breaking the boycott ==
In the 1962–63 season, Vienna's Volkstheater, under the direction of Leon Epp, ventured to stage a play by Bertolt Brecht again for the first time: it was Mother Courage and Her Children, directed by Gustav Manker. His theater was even offered money to cancel the show. The production had previously been postponed several times, first due to the illness of actress Dorothea Neff and most recently because of the building of the Berlin Wall. The performance was a gamble; the press spoke of a "blockade breaker" premiere on February 23, 1963 (with Dorothea Neff, who was awarded the Kainz Medal for her performance, in the title role, Fritz Muliar as the cook, Ulrich Wildgruber as Schweizerkas, Ernst Meister as the army chaplain, Hilde Sochor as Yvette, Kurt Sowinetz as the canvasser, and Paola Löw, later Friedrich Torberg's partner, as the mute Kathrin). Manker subsequently staged The Caucasian Chalk Circle (1964), Saint Joan of the Stockyards (1965) and The Good Person of Sezuan (1968) at the Volkstheater, thus setting a reappraisal of Brecht's work into motion.

The Caucasian Chalk Circle (with Hilde Sochor as Grusche, Fritz Muliar as village judge Azdak and Kurt Sowinetz as Schauwa) earned "unanimous, almost demonstrative applause for Vienna's bravest theater" in 1964 (Ernst Lothar on April 27, 1964 in the "Express"). The Salzburger Nachrichten wrote: "If Brecht's banishment was interrupted for the first time with 'Mother Courage', it now seems to have been lifted with the 'Chalk Circle'" and "Die Bühne" called the performance a "theatrical event". The Wiener Montag, however, still saw in the play "a pure Marxist doctrinal demonstration" and wrote: "After three hours of 'pleasure,' one left the theater ice-cold to the fingertips and disgusted by such political rallies on stage."

== Other theaters ==
There were isolated exceptions to the Brecht boycott at theaters outside of Vienna. The Graz Opera House performed Mother Courage on May 30, 1958. At the Salzburg Landestheater, Fritz Klingenbeck dared to perform Brecht's The Good Person of Sezuan in 1960. In 1963, the State Theater of Linz also performed Mother Courage. Finally, in the spring of 1964, there were performances of The Caucasian Chalk Circle in Linz and Klagenfurt.

On December 14, 1958, as part of a guest performance by the Deutsches Theater Berlin, an evening of songs and recitations was held at the Vienna Konzerthaus. The Brecht matinee included "Songs. Poems. Stories." which had been performed for the first time in Berlin on February 10, 1957. The majority of the Viennese press kept quiet about the concert. In the Volksstimme, the central organ of the Austrian Communist Party, Edmund Theodor Kauer took the Brecht evening as an opportunity to criticize the continuing Brecht boycott."

1966 saw Brecht's first performance at Vienna's Burgtheater, Life of Galileo directed by Kurt Meisel with Curd Jürgens in the title role.

In the Federal Republic of Germany, too, a Brecht boycott was propagated intermittently in 1953 and after the building of the Berlin Wall in 1961, but it did not catch on. The Munich critic Joachim Kaiser called the Austrian "Brecht boycott" a "remarkable journalistic triumph.

As late as 1973, in the course of the Forum Stadtpark's split from the Austrian P.E.N. Club, Alfred Kolleritsch and Klaus Hoffer called Friedrich Torberg a "Brecht-blocker" and "CIA protégé" in the magazine manuskripte, which resulted in a libel case.

== Sources ==
- Kurt Palm: Vom Boykott zur Anerkennung. Brecht und Österreich. Löcker, Wien / München 1983, ISBN 3-85409-064-1.
- Joachim Kaiser: Heißer Krieg gegen kühle Dramen. Zu Torbergs Anti-Brecht-Thesen. In: Der Monat 14 (1961).
