= Edith Neumann =

Austrian-American chemist and microbiologist

Edith Spitzer Neumann
- Born: May 26, 1902; Vienna, Austria
- Died: June 29, 2002 (aged 100); New York City, New York
- Spouse: Frederick Neumann
- Scientific career
- Fields: Microbiology

Edith Neumann (May 26, 1902–June 29, 2002) was an Austrian microbiologist.

== Life ==
Edith Neumann was born in Vienna, Austria, on June 29, 1902, to lawyer and art collector Alfred Spitzer and wife Hermine. She studied chemistry and physics at the University of Vienna and received her doctorate in 1927. At the time of her attendance, she was the only woman studying there. In 1924, Neumann converted to Christianity, and soon after in 1925, got engaged to Frederick Neumann, also a Christian convert. The two got married in 1927.

After spending two years in Zagreb, Yugoslavia, they returned to Vienna in 1936. They did not stay long however, for they moved around Europe going to places through the Danube to places such as northern Italy, Paris, and finally London, fearing Frederick's arrest following the rise of Hitler. In 1939, she and her husband moved to Haifa, for missionary work. In 1948, the Neumann's moved to the United States and settled in New York.

Neumann first worked as a bacteriologist at the Jewish Hospital in Brooklyn. Following that, she worked at Maimonides Hospital as a microbiologist, where she stayed for 20 years. After her husband's death in 1967, Neumann moved to Manhattan and became a medical director at the Jetti Katz Clinical Laboratory, where she stayed until her retirement at the age of 80.

After her retirement, she spent most of her time translating her husband's sermons into German. Neumann also maintained a strong connection with her father's art collection. She received an Austrian Cross of Honor for Science and Art First Class in 1998.

Neumann died in New York City on June 29, 2002.
