= The Unintentional Kidnapping of Mrs. Elfriede Ott =

- Film poster
- German: Die unabsichtliche Entführung der Frau Elfriede Ott
- Directed by: Andreas Prochaska
- Starring: Michael Ostrowski; Elfriede Ott
- Release date: 1 October 2010
- Running time: 113 minutes
- Country: Austria
- Language: German

The Unintentional Kidnapping of Mrs. Elfriede Ott (German: Die unabsichtliche Entführung der Frau Elfriede Ott) is a 2010 Austrian comedy film directed by Andreas Prochaska.

== Cast ==
- Michael Ostrowski as Toni Cantussi
- Elfriede Ott as Elfriede Ott
- Andreas Kiendl as Horst Wippel
- Gerhard Liebmann as Gerry Dirschl
- Angelika Niedetzky as Vroni Polster
- Simon Hatzl as Gruppeninspektor Karl Kramer
- Thomas Mraz as Reinhard Meinhard Ott
