= Kurt Roger =

Austrian-American composer (1895–1966)

Kurt George Roger (3 May 1895 – 4 August 1966) was an Austrian–American composer.

Roger was born in Austria on 3 May 1895 to Viennese parents and studied in Vienna with Guido Adler, and in class with Arnold Schoenberg - though not following Schoenberg's 12-tone system. He taught at the Vienna Conservatoire from 1923 to 1938 and his works were receiving high-profile performances (including the premiere of his String Quintet No.1 by the Rosé String Quartet) until the Nazi Anschluss forced his emigration to the United States via London. He became an American citizen in 1945 and held teaching positions in New York and Washington DC, lecturing at several universities and giving radio talks, notably on Bruckner and Mahler.

His music has received many notable performances including those by the Chicago Symphony Orchestra under Rafael Kubelik, the Rochester Philharmonic under Erich Leinsdorf, the New York Chamber Orchestra, the National Symphony Orchestra of Washington DC, the Vienna Symphony Orchestra, the BBC Northern Orchestra under Sir Charles Groves and the BBC National Orchestra of Wales under Jac van Steen.

From 1948 onwards Roger was invited back to Austria on lecture tours, whose venues included the Academy of Music in Vienna and the Mozarteum in Salzburg. In 1964 he accepted a guest professorship at Queen's University Belfast. As Roger's wife was born in Ulster, this proved to be a happy coda to his life. In 1965 the Austrian government conferred on him the Order of Merit first class in the field of art and science. He died on 4 August 1966 on a visit to Vienna and was subsequently given a grave of honour there. In a memorial address in Vienna given by Doctor Wilhelm von Waldstein of the Gesellschaft der Musikfreunde, Roger's work was praised for ‘its individual style, its bold but tonally-based harmonic system, its faintly Romantic quality, its strict adherence to conventional form and its unconventional tone quality in both vocal and instrumental scores.’

His scores are preserved at the Gesellschaft der Musikfreunde in Vienna and by his family.

== Selected works ==
Opera

- Die Frau Jephtas, Op. 15 (1933–1934)

Orchestral

- Gotische Phantasie und Passacaglia, Op. 26 (1936)
- Fortinbras, Overture, Op. 45 (1944)
- Symphony No. 1 in F major, Op. 52 (1946)
- Variations on a Theme of Richard Wagner, Op. 65 (1951)
- Symphony No. 2 for chamber orchestra, Op. 102 (c. 1962)
- Symphony No. 3, Op. 104 (c. 1963)
- Town and Country Dances

Concertante

- Concerto Grosso No. 1 for solo trumpet, timpani and string orchestra, Op. 27 (1938)
- Concerto Grosso No. 2 for trombone, flute, oboe, clarinet, percussion and string orchestra, Op. 71 (1951)
- Concerto for tuba, timpani, triangle and string orchestra, Op. 91 (c. 1956)
- Concerto for 2 horns, timpani and string orchestra, Op. 115 (1965)

Chamber music

- String Quintet No. 1, Op. 7 (1929–1930)
- String Quartet No. 1, Op. 9 (1931)
- String Sextet, Op. 10 (1932)
- String Quartet No. 2, Op. 11 (1932)
- String Quartet No. 3, Op. 16 (1934)
- String Quartet No. 4 Divertimento, Op. 33 (1937)
- Sonata da camera for cello and piano, Op. 35 (1937)
- Irish Sonata for viola and piano, Op. 37 (1939)
- Suite for flute, oboe, clarinet, horn and bassoon, Op. 40 (1940)
- String Trio, Op. 42 (1942)
- Sonata for violin and piano, Op. 44 (1944)
- Variations on "Oh du lieber Augustin" for flute, oboe, clarinet, violin, viola and cello, Op. 49 (1944)
- Variations on an Irish Air for flute, cello and piano, Op. 58 (1948)
- Suite for 4 trumpets, 4 trombones (or 3 trombones and tuba) and timpani, Op. 62 (1950)
- Partita for cello and piano, Op. 67 (1951)
- Piano Trio, Op. 77 (1953)
- Sonata for viola solo, Op. 79 (1954)
- Suite for viola and piano, Op. 84 (1954)
- Sonata for violin solo, Op. 89
- Phantasy Sonata for viola d'amore and piano, Op. 95 (1957)
- Trio for horn, violin and piano, Op. 96 (1957)
- String Quintet No. 2 for 2 violins, viola, cello and double bass, Op. 100 (1959–1960)
- Quartet for flute, bassoon and 2 violas, Op. 101
- Variations on a Theme of Anton Bruckner, Octet, Op. 108 (1963)
- Variations on a Theme of Gustav Mahler for flute, oboe, clarinet, horn and bassoon, Op. 112 (1964)
- Trio for violin, viola and piano, Op. 114 (1965)
- Quintet for clarinet and string quartet, Op. 116 (1966)

Organ

- Passacaglia (Gothic Passacaglia), Op. 26a (1936)

Piano

- Ballade, Op. 17 (1934)
- Piano Sonata, Op. 43 (1943)
- Dance Suite, Op. 54 (1946)

Choral

- 2 Madrigals for mixed chorus a cappella, Op. 60 (1950)

1. Requiem; words by Robert Louis Stevenson
2. Child in the Orchard; words by Arthur Stringer

Vocal

- Eros, Lyric Suite for soprano or tenor and piano, Op. 4 (1919–1922)
- 2 Odes for alto and chamber orchestra, Op. 6 (1922–1925)
- 3 Songs, Op. 8 (1928); words by Sándor Petőfi
- 3 Songs, Op. 19 (1935); words by Gottfried Keller
- 3 Songs, Op. 22 (1936); words by Hermann Hesse
- 3 Sonnets for alto and piano, Op. 32 (1937)
- 3 Songs for baritone and string quartet, Op. 34 (1937)
- 3 American Poems, Op. 39 (1941); words by Mary Brent Whiteside
- Three Prayers in War Time, Op. 50 (1944)
- 3 Irish Poems, Op. 56 (1947)
- Japanische Blüten, Op. 59 (1949)
- 3 Love Odes for baritone, harp and string quartet, Op. 72 (1952)
- The Watcher on the Tower, Cantata for soprano, baritone, bass and string quartet, Op. 105 (1964); words by Madison J. Cawlin
