= Erwin Steinhauer =

Austrian actor

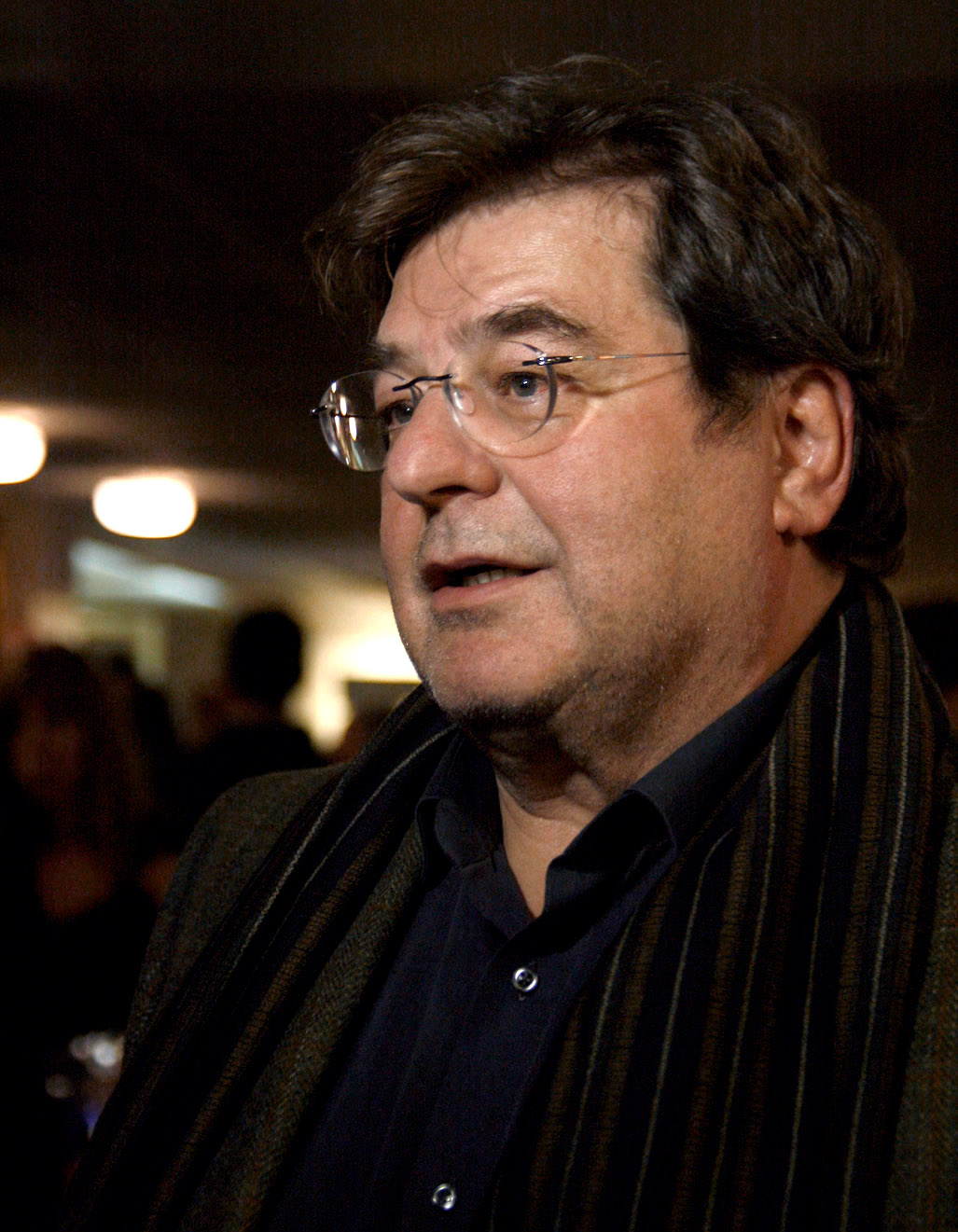
Erwin Steinhauer at the premiere of the movie The Unintentional Kidnapping of Mrs. Elfriede Ott at the Gartenbaukino in Vienna.

Erwin Steinhauer (born 19 September 1951 in Vienna) is an Austrian actor.

== Selected filmography ==
- Der Sonne entgegen (1985, TV series)
- Lovers (1995, TV film)
- Single Bells (1997, TV film)
- Tödliche Diamanten (1998, TV film)
- Fever (1998, TV film)
- Hero of the Gladiators (2003, TV film)
- Vanished (2011, TV film)
- Sarajevo (2014, TV film)
