= Friedrich Torberg =

Austrian writer

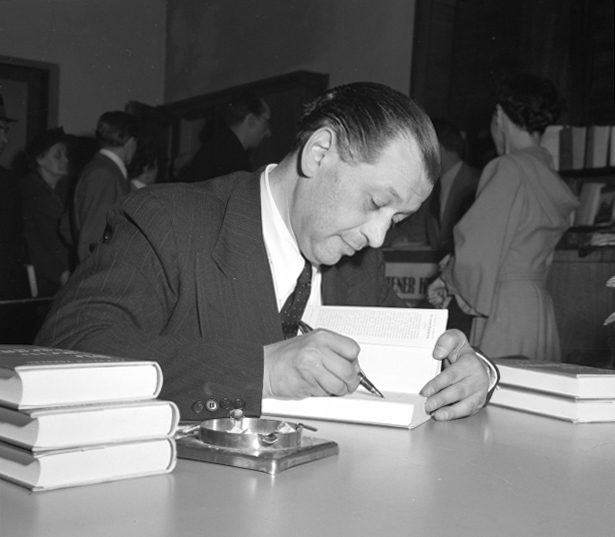
Friedrich Torberg 1951

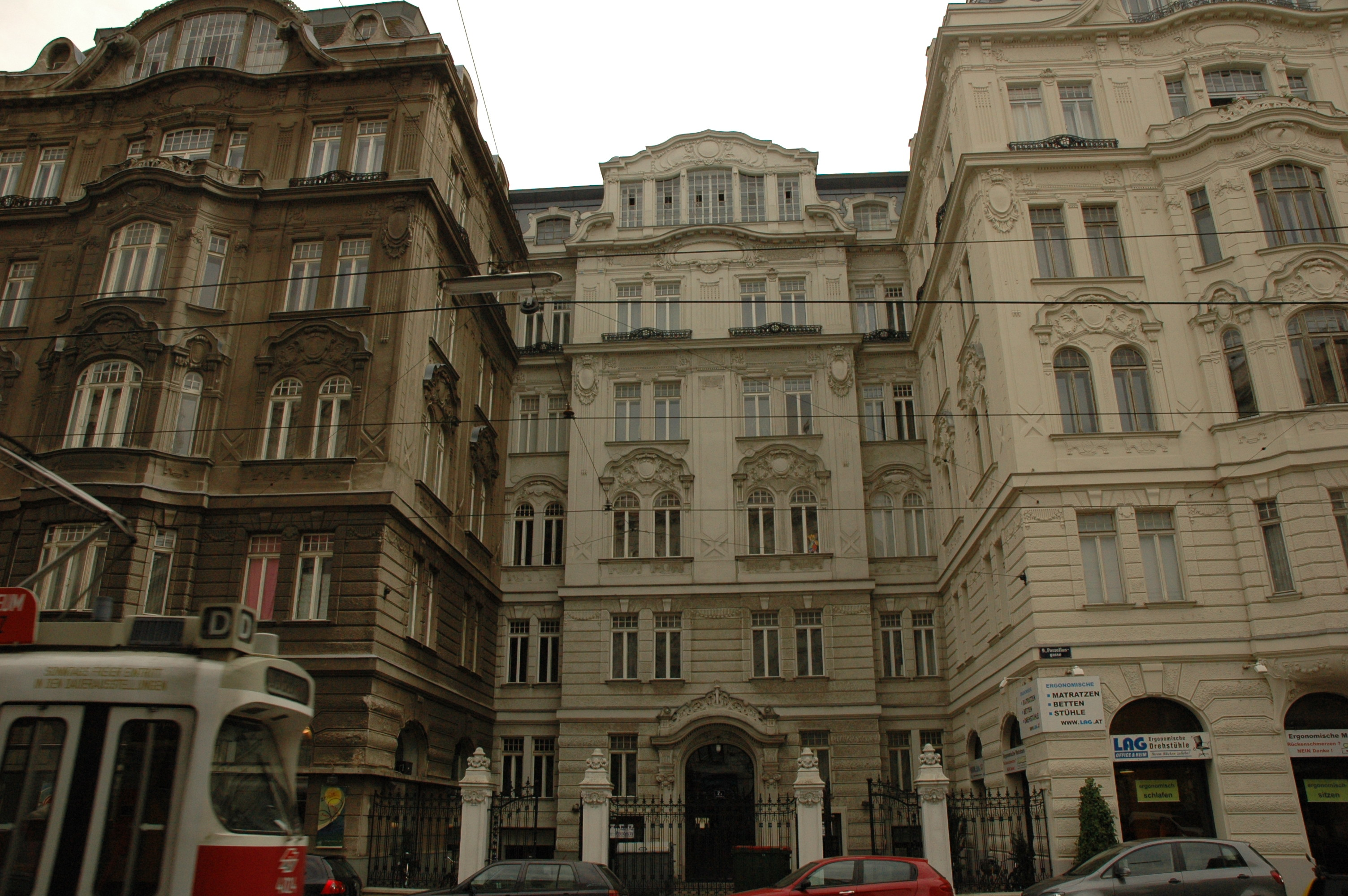
Friedrich Torberg's birthplace in Vienna, Porzellangasse 7a

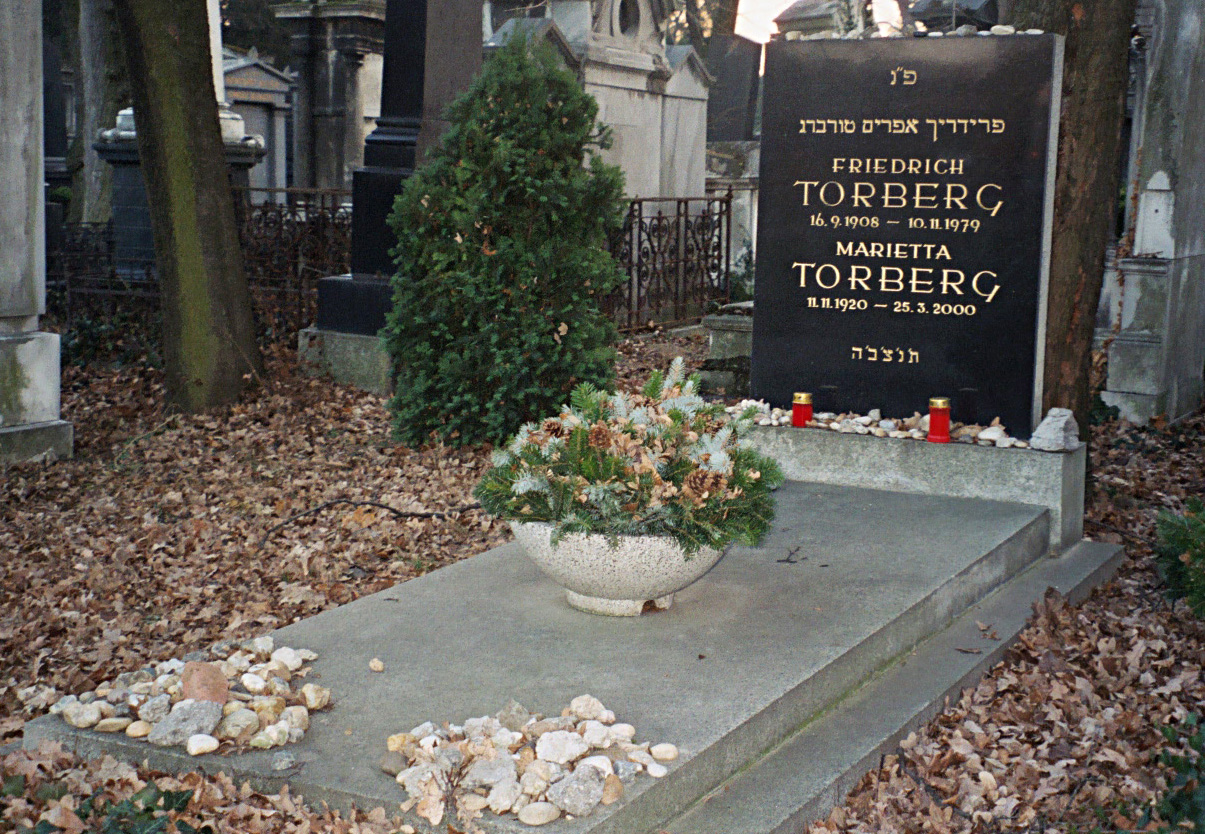
Torberg's grave at the Zentralfriedhof in Vienna

Friedrich Torberg (16 September 1908, Vienna, Alsergrund – 10 November 1979, Vienna) is the pen-name of Friedrich Kantor, an Austrian writer.

== Biography ==
He worked as a critic and journalist in Vienna and Prague until 1938, when his Jewish heritage compelled him to emigrate to France and, later, after being invited by the New York PEN-Club as one of "Ten outstanding German Anti-Nazi-Writers" (along with Heinrich Mann, Franz Werfel, Alfred Döblin, Leonhard Frank, Alfred Polgar, and others) to the United States, where he worked as a scriptwriter in Hollywood and then for Time magazine in New York City. In 1951 he returned to Vienna, where he remained for the rest of his life.

Torberg is known best for his satirical writings in fiction and nonfiction, as well as his translations into German of the stories of Ephraim Kishon, which remain the standard German language version of Kishon's work. A staunch anti-communist, Torberg used his prominence as a theater critic to boycott Bertolt Brecht's plays in most of Austria for over a decade.

Austrian Olympic swimmer and swimsuit model Hedy Bienenfeld was the inspiration for the character "Lisa" in his novel The Pupil Gerber (Der Schüler Gerber).

== Quotes ==
Some phrases from Tante Jolesch, which Torberg compiled, have also become well known. Torberg credits the title character as the originator of the following two:

“All cities are the same, only Venice is a little different.”

“What makes a man more beautiful than an ape is a luxury!”

== Honours and awards ==
- Julius-Empire Award (1933)
- Title of Professor (1958)
- City of Vienna Prize for Journalism (1966)
- Grand Cross of the Order of Merit of the Federal Republic of Germany (1968)
- Austrian Cross of Honour for Science and Art, 1st class (1968)
- Gold Medal of the Austrian capital Vienna (1974)
- Richard Champion Medal (1974)
- Austrian Decoration for Science and Art (1976)
- Grand Austrian State Prize for Literature (1979)
- Naming of Torberggasse in Penzing (Vienna 14th District) (1981)

== Selected works ==
- Der Schüler Gerber hat absolviert (1930) (this semi-autobiographical novel tells the story of a grammar school student under the oppression of a tyrannical teacher); later editions bore the shortened title Der Schüler Gerber, under which the novel is now generally known.
- … und glauben, es wäre die Liebe (1932)
- Mein ist die Rache. Novel. Pazifische Presse, Santa Monica, CA, 1943. Translated by Stephanie Gorrell Ortega as Vengeance is Mine, Boiler House Press, Norwich, UK, 2026.
- Süsskind von Trimberg. Novel. Fischer, Frankfurt am Main 1972, ISBN 3-10-079002-2 (fictitious biography)
- Die Tante Jolesch oder Der Untergang des Abendlandes in Anekdoten (1975) (a collection of amusing yet bittersweet anecdotes about Jewish life and personalities in pre-Nazi Vienna and Prague, and in the emigration), translated by Maria Poglitsch Bauer and Sonat Hart, Ariadne Press, 2008, ISBN 978-1-57241-149-4.
- Die Erben der Tante Jolesch (1978) (the sequel to the above)

== See also ==
- List of Austrian writers
