= Anatomy of Evil =

Austrian crime drama television series

- Spuren des Bösen
- Written by: Martin Ambrosch
- Directed by: Andreas Prochaska
- Country of origin: Austria
- Original language: German
- No. of episodes: 9

Production
- Running time: 90 minutes
- Production companies: ORF; ZDF

Original release
- Release: 5 January 2011 (ORF 2); 12 January 2012 (ZDF)

Anatomy of Evil (German title Spuren des Bösen) is an Austrian German-language crime drama series which debuted in 2011, starring Heino Ferch in the lead role of psychiatrist and interrogation specialist Richard Brock. As of January 2021, there have been nine installments in the series. Like other crime series in German-speaking countries, each "episode" is a 90-minute TV movie.

The show is a co-production of Austrian public broadcaster ORF and German public broadcaster ZDF and is directed by Andreas Prochaska. It was originally planned to be a single movie, but was expanded into a series due to its success.

For the English subtitled version, the show is titled "Anatomy of Evil". In Italy the show is called "Richard Brock" after the main character.
