= Peter Bogner (art historian) =

Austrian art historian (born 1963)

- Born: 1963 (age 62–63); Vienna, Austria
- Occupations: Art historian; Architect; Cultural manager; Director of the Kiesler Private Foundation
- Known for: Director of the Vienna Künstlerhaus (2003–2013)

Peter Bogner (born 1963) is an Austrian art historian, architect, cultural manager, and current director of the Kiesler Private Foundation. From 2003 to 2013, he was the director of the Vienna Künstlerhaus.

== Life ==
Peter Bogner studied architecture at the University of Applied Arts Vienna with Hans Hollein and art history at the University of Vienna. From 1998 to 2002, he served as secretary general of the Association of Austrian Galleries of Modern Art from 1998 to 2002. From 2003 to 2013, he was director of the Vienna Künstlerhaus. From 2005 to 2011, he was chairman of the Association of Austrian Art Historians. Since 2013, Peter Bogner has been the Director of the Lillian and Friedrich Kiesler Private Foundation.

== Honours ==
- Austrian Cross of Honour for Science and Art (2013)
