= Michael Schratz =

Austrian educational researcher

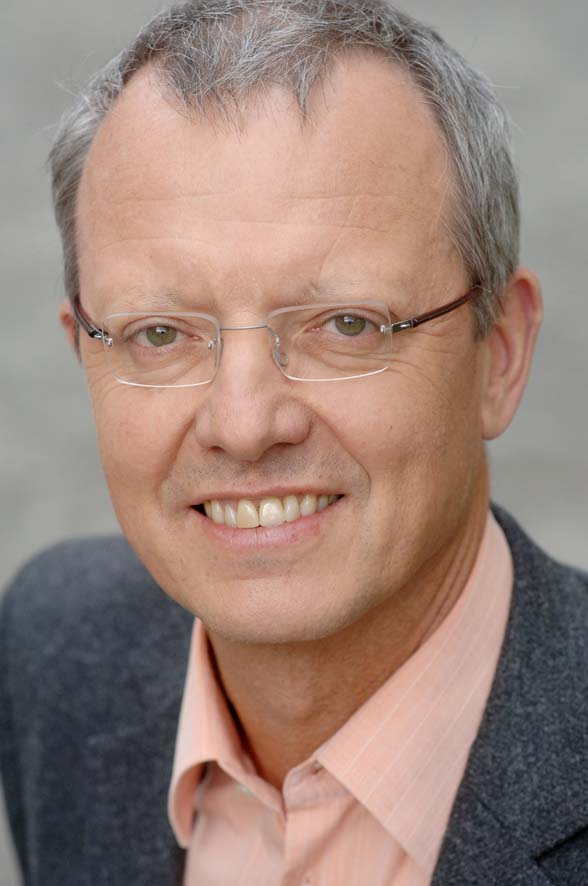

Michael Schratz (born 1952) is an Austrian educational researcher, and professor of education at the University of Innsbruck.

== Biography ==
Michael Schratz was born in 1952 in Graz, Austria. In 1979, after his obtaining his degree in British and American Studies and Physical Education (including teacher licenses for upper and lower secondary school), Schratz earned his doctorate in Education and Psychology. As a research assistant at the Institute of Educational Sciences at the University of Innsbruck, he completed his post-doctoral qualifications (Habilitation) in 1984. After graduation, he took long-term visits abroad to Bristol, United Kingdom, Hanover, Germany, San Diego, California and Geelong, Australia. Schratz also held guest professorships at the University of Klagenfurt, Schlaining),

Returning to the University of Innsbruck, Schratz was appointed university professor of Education at the Department for Teacher Education and School Researchk. He was head of the department until 2008, when he was appointed Dean of the Faculty for Education.

Schratz's research interest is in school development, system development and learning, with a special emphasis on qualification and professionalization programmes for school leadership and school improvement. As a policy advisor, system developer and consultant, he is involved with numerous national and international projects and networks engaged in quality development of educational systems and the teacher education reform, in particular Leadership for Learning.

Schratz is the author of over 500 publications in both English and German and his work has been translated into several languages. He also functions as the editor of academic volumes and series and is founding co-editor of the Journal für Schulentwicklung, Lernende Schule, and the Journal für LehrerInnenbildung.

== Current projects and focus areas ==
=== Leadership Academy ===
As Co-Founder and Academic Director of the Leadership Academy, an Austrian initiative by the Federal Ministry of Education, Art and Culture for system development in the field of education, Schratz has initiated and developed with Wilfried Schley Austria's first professionalization programme across structural boundaries based on Leadership for Learning.

The Leadership Academy networks the potential of leader at various levels throughout the Austrian education system, creating a dynamic for exponential development. Research efforts related to the Leadership Academy have led to the creation of the Leadership Competence Scale (Leadership-Kompetenz-Skala LKS) and Collegial Team Coaching (Kollegiales Teamcoaching KTC).

=== Learning research ===
Lead Researcher and Director of “Personal Educational Processes in Academically Diverse Settings”, a foundational research project funded by the Austrian Science Fund (FWF) at University of Innsbruck. This nationwide research project investigates the experiences of 5th-grade students in Austria's “New Middle School” reform pilot, which has since led to a mandated school reform.

The first phase of the study firmly placed research in the reality of everyday school life, with the aim of data collection oriented to tactfully accessing the inaccessible, the lived experience of children at school, in medias res. The project has resulted in a new approach to foundational research in learning, the “Innsbrucker Vignette Research”.

== Positions ==
- Academic Advisor and Consultant for the Austrian school reform pilot “New Middle School” (Neue Mittelschule) which has led to the mandated partial restructuring of lower secondary education in Austria (with Wilfried Schley).
- Academic Advisor and Consultant of the National Center for Learning Schools (Bundeszentrum für lernende Schulen) of the Ministry of Education, Arts and Culture.
- Representative of the European Commission in the Thematic Working Group (TWG) “Teacher Education” of the European Union
- Austrian Representative in the “European Network for Teacher Education Policies (ENTEP)”
- Spokesperson and Member of the jury for the German School Award (Deutscher Schulpreis) of the Robert Bosch Foundation, Heidehof Foundation, Stern, and ZDF.
- Lead Researcher in the Austrian country-specific study “Educational Policy Cultures in Parliamentary Systems“
- National Project Manager of the Central European education cooperation, as part of the LLL Project of EU International Cooperation for School Leadership (ICSL) with Tempus Public Foundation in Budapest.

== Honours ==
- Professor Honoris Causa awarded by the University of Bucharest.
- Fellow, International Academy of Science, Munich
