= Hans Plank =

Austrian artist

Hans Plank

Hans Plank (29 March 1925 – 25 April 1992) was an Austrian artist who in 1983 was awarded the Austrian Medal for Science and Art.

== Selected publications ==
- Johann Baptist Wengler. Ein Maler des Biedermeier. With reproductions, including a self-portrait. (With Johann Baptist Wengler)
- Klimt-Schiele-Kokoschka: Three expressionists and their successors. London: Zachary Kwinter Books, 1991. (Translated from the original German by Stephen Gorman). ISBN 187253242X
