= Klaus Ebner =

Austrian writer (born 1964)

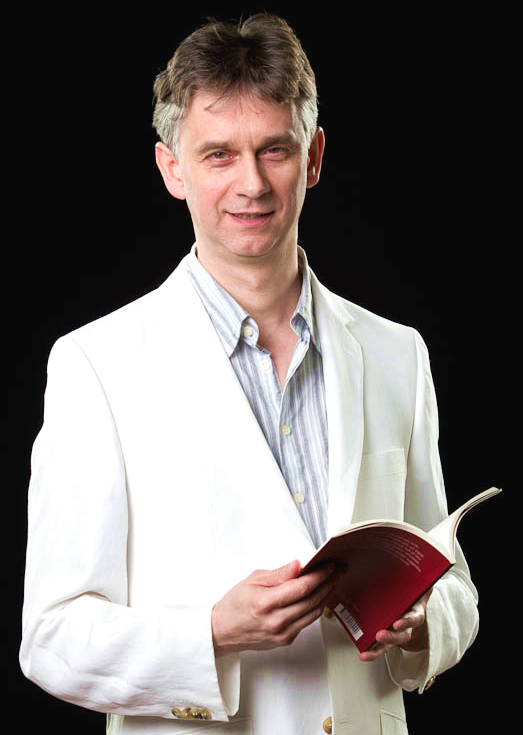
- Klaus Ebner in 2011
- Born: 8 August 1964 (age 62); Vienna
- Occupations: Writer, essayist, poet, translator
- Writing career
- Period: Contemporary
- Notable work: Hominid (novel)

Klaus Ebner (born 8 August 1964) is an Austrian writer, essayist, poet, and translator. Born and raised in Vienna, he began writing at an early age. He started submitting stories to magazines in the 1980s, and also published articles and books on software topics after 1989. Ebner's poetry is written in German and Catalan; he also translates French and Catalan literature into German. He is a member of several Austrian writers associations, including the Grazer Autorenversammlung.

His works include cultural essays on Catalan topics, and stories dealing with Jewish traditions. His first collection of short stories was printed in 2007. In 2008, Ebner published the short novel Hominide. He has received several literature awards, among them the Youth Prize Erster Österreichischer Jugendpreis in 1982, and the Viennese Wiener Werkstattpreis in 2007. Austrian critics, such as Wolfgang Ratz, have praised Ebner's prose-style. The writer lives in Vienna with his family.

== Life ==
Klaus Ebner was born on 8 August 1964 in Vienna, Austria, where he grew up. His mother, Ingeborg (b. 1944), worked as a hairdresser and his father, Walter (1939–1996), was a salesman who sold home entertainment products in the 1970s and later. His sister was born in 1969; the family moved one year later. Ebner attended Secondary School for eight years, and his first writing experiences date back to this time; at the age of twelve he wrote a short theater play and rehearsed it with his friends at school. However, the play was never performed.

In 1982, after a one-month university trip to Tours, France, Ebner began studying Romance languages, German philology, and translation at the University of Vienna. At this time he was already working for a literary circle and Viennese literature magazine. After graduation in 1988 and 1989 he concentrated on various professional careers, such as translation, foreign language teaching and IT projects. In the 1990s, Ebner published articles and books on software and networking topics; while these books were written in German, he also wrote some articles in English. In 1999, he spent six weeks in North Carolina, and was the co-author of a book in English about PC servers.

In 2001, while studying European economics at a Viennese university of applied sciences, he authored a paper about Islamism in Europe, which was published in Germany in 2001. He also wrote several stories dealing with the Muslim civilization, such as in "Momentaufnahme" ("Snapshot") and "Flug sechs-zwo-zwo" ("Flight six-two-two)", "orgiastisch" ("orgiastic") and others. Ebner lives in Vienna with his family. He is a member of the Austrian writers' associations Grazer Autorenversammlung (GAV) and Österreichischer Schriftstellerverband (ÖSV).

== Work ==
Since graduating from school, Ebner has written short prose, poetry and radio plays. His work has been published in literary and cultural magazines such as Sterz, one of the largest literary magazine from Styria, Austria, and in Lesezirkel, which was owned by the Viennese daily newspaper Wiener Zeitung. The topic of his 1988 master's thesis (Diplomarbeit), written in French, was titled "The Image of the Catalan Countries in French literature from Romanticism till Today". Excerpts of a Catalan Diary, containing travel journals and comments on Catalan culture, were published in 1987, and in several essays he discusses Catalan culture.

Increasing professional obligations after the birth of his first son in 1987 coincided with a reduction in his literary output. During the 1990s he instead focused his attention on his novel Feuers Geraun. Two early versions of this novel's chapters were published by the Upper Austrian magazine die Rampe in 1994 (Der Schreiber von Aram) and 1997 (Das Gesetz). These chapters deal with Jewish and biblical traditions. The publishing list on Ebner's website lists only six publications in anthologies by 2004, but seventeen are listed from between 2005 and 2008.

Ebner has additionally written narrative fiction (novels, short stories, short prose), essays and poems. His poetry is written in German and Catalan. Supported by a subsidy for literature from the Austrian government, he went to Andorra in 2007 to write an essay about the country in the Pyrenees. He also translated the novel L'Absent written by the Catalan author Josep Navarro Santaeulàlia, into German. Ebner's cultural essays about Catalan culture, such as that of Barcelona and Andorra, have been published by the magazines Literatur und Kritik and Zitig. His first collection of short stories, Lose (Destinies), was published in 2007. Of its 45 stories, twenty-two had already been printed in newspapers, literary magazines or anthologies. In 2008, Ebner published two other books of narrative fiction, among them the short novel Hominide.

=== Style of writing ===
Ebner's short stories in particular cover a multitude of topics, which, as critic Julia Rafael states, treat actual and socially relevant problems. She describes the stories included in the anthology Lose as "somewhat imploding" and says that "phantasms, irony and humor have their place, too". Moreover, Ebner's metaphors have been described as "passing beyond reality without losing ground". According to journalist Paul C. Jezek, Ebner's writing style is characterized by very careful and acerbic wording. Each sentence has a melody; his short prose especially sounds lyrical. Jezek compares Ebner's sentences to "Japanese paintings – every word has been chosen with special care". Austrian writer and critic Wolfgang Ratz made a similar observation, drawing attention to "the accurateness of Ebner's speech" and "his affinity with formal details", while singling out the sarcastic stridency of the critical stories.

=== Awards and accomplishments ===
In 1982, Ebner was awarded the Youth Prize for Literature (Großer Österreichischer Jugendpreis) for his novella Das Brandmal (The Stigma), which had attracted the attention of Austrian critic and jury member Hans Weigel. Weigel compared Ebner to Austria's 19th century novella writer Ferdinand von Saar. The novella tells the story of a young community servant who, through his service, becomes acquainted with a seemingly bewildered pensioner; a Viennese Jew whose bewilderment is a direct consequence of his experiences in a concentration camp during the Third Reich. One year later, the novella was published in several parts in Israel's German newspaper Israel-Nachrichten. The jury of the Feldkircher Lyrikpreis 2005 pointed out Ebner's precise language and his "consequent work on wording". In 2007, Ebner's poem, "a paperman and sick", became one of the Mentioned Poems at the International Poetry Prize Nosside. The jury referred to the "metropolitan tristesse" in the poem which describes a "paperman" whose "meal consists of loneliness":

German (original poem)	English (presented to Nosside by the author)
ein Zettler krank vergessen ganz im Suff die Wagenräder sperren zäh sein Mahl besteht aus Einsamkeit garniert mit Sehnsucht nach Vergangenem betört von lauten Rufen; Hoffnung wie vor langem sie verlosch	a paperman and sick forlorn in drunkenness the wheels are blocking clumsily his meal consists of loneliness its garnish is the yearning for the past beguiled by shouts of thunder hope that long ago has died

In 2008, Ebner was awarded the Wiener Werkstattpreis for his short story "Der Flügel Last" ("The Wings' Burden"), which describes a seven-year-old girl who has cancer. Another award-winning essay, "Was blieb vom Weißen Ritter?" ("What Remains of the White Knight?"), gives insight into the medieval novel Tirant lo Blanch by Joanot Martorell from Valencia. Ebner intermingled his own reading experience with philological and historical information to create "Was blieb vom Weißen Ritter?".

== Awards and literary prizes ==
- 1982 Erster Österreichischer Jugendpreis (Youth Prize for Literature) for the novella Das Brandmal/The Stigma
- 1984 Radio Play Award by the literary magazine Texte (3rd)
- 1988 Erster Österreichischer Jugendpreis (Youth Prize for Literature) for the novel Nils
- 2004 La Catalana de Lletres 2004, Mention and publication in the anthology, Barcelona
- 2005 Feldkircher Lyrikpreis (4th)
- 2007 Premio Internazionale di Poesia Nosside, Mention and publication in the anthology, Reggio Calabria
- 2007 Travel Subsidy by the Austrian Government
- 2008 Two Subsidies for Literature by the Austrian Government
- 2008 Wiener Werkstattpreis 2007, Vienna
- 2009 Travel Subsidy by the Austrian Government
- 2010 Second Prize of the Short Prose Award "Sprachräume – Schreibwelten" of the Austrian Writers' Association
- 2014 Premi de Poesia Parc Taulí; Catalan Poetry Prize

== Publications ==
=== English Translations ===
- Why (...I write); autobiographical essay, Books on Demand, Norderstedt (FRG), ISBN 978-3-7519-0379-0

=== German Books ===
- Wortspieler. Samuel Becketts Suche nach der verlorenen Sprache.; essay, Books on Demand, Norderstedt (FRG), ISBN 978-3-7519-3585-2
- Warum (...ich schreibe); autobiographical essay, Books on Demand, Norderstedt (FRG), ISBN 978-3-7494-7041-9
- Ohne Gummi/Without rubber; stories, Arovell Verlag, Gosau-Salzburg-Wien, ISBN 978-3-902808-36-3
- Dort und anderswo/There and elsewhere; essays on travels and literature, Wels 2011, ISBN 978-3-9502828-9-4
- Andorranische Impressionen; essay, Wieser Verlag, Klagenfurt 2011, ISBN 978-3-85129-934-2
- wieso der Mückenschwarm dein Augenlicht umtanzt/why the midges dance around your eyes; poetry, Edition Art Science, St. Wolfgang 2011, ISBN 978-3-902157-88-1
- Hominide/Hominid; short novel, FZA Verlag, Vienna 2008, ISBN 978-3-9502299-7-4
- Auf der Kippe/On the brink; prose, Arovell Verlag, Gosau 2008, ISBN 978-3-902547-67-5
- Lose/Destinies; short stories, Edition Nove, Neckenmarkt 2007, ISBN 978-3-85251-197-9

=== Catalan Books ===
- Forats; poetry, Books on Demand, Madrid 2020, ISBN 978-84-1326-290-1
- Vestigis; poetry, Books on Demand, Madrid 2019, ISBN 978-84-1326-643-5
- Blaus/Shades of Blue; poetry, Pagès Editors, Barcelona 2015, ISBN 978-84-9975-627-1
- Vermells/Shades of Red; poetry, SetzeVents (Catalan article), Urús 2009, ISBN 978-84-92555-10-9

=== Other publications ===
- "Josep Pla"; essay about the Catalan writer Josep Pla. In: Zitig (online magazine), Vienna 2008
- "Was blieb vom Weißen Ritter?"; essay about the medieval novel Tirant lo Blanch. In: Wordshop X – Wiener Werkstattpreis 2007 (brochure), FZA Verlag, Vienna 2008
- "Die Stadt und das Meer"; essay about Barcelona. In: Reisenotizen, FZA Verlag, Vienna 2007, ISBN 978-3-9502299-4-3
- "Die Freiheit ist eine Funzel"; essay on freedom and liberty. In: Lichtungen nr. 109 (ISSN 1012-4705), Graz 2007
- "Von der Legende zur Modernität"; essay about Andorra. In: Literatur und Kritik nr. 411/412 (ISSN 0024-466X), Salzburg 2007
- "Die Kunst ist der Anfang"; essay on translation of literature. In: Literarisches Österreich nr. 1/07 (magazine, ZVR 295943463), Vienna 2007
- "Das Reizvolle der Prophezeiung"; essay on prophecies. In: Sterz nr. 99 (magazine, GZ 02Z033378M), Graz 2006
- "Das Gfrett mit der Reform"; essay about the new German orthography. In: Literarisches Österreich nr. 2/04 (magazine, ZVR 295943463), Vienna 2004

== See also ==
- List of Austrian writers
