= Hominid (novel) =

Book by Klaus Ebner

- Book cover
- Author: Klaus Ebner
- Original title: Hominide
- Language: German
- Genre: Satirical novel
- Publisher: FZA Verlag
- Publication date: October 2008
- Publication place: Austria
- Media type: Print (paperback)
- Pages: 100
- ISBN: 978-3-9502299-7-4
- Preceded by: Auf der Kippe
- Followed by: Vermells

Hominid is a short novel by Austrian writer Klaus Ebner. Taking place millions of years ago, it is a fictional story of a band of extinct hominids who inhabit Central Africa. Referencing the seven days of biblical Creation, the novel takes place in seven days. As the protagonist Pitar leads his band to civilization, tension arises between the clan leader Costello and his rival Re. Over the course of the story, Pitar invents tools, discovers the use of fire, and falls in love with Maluma. The seventh day marks a turning point in the storyline, as the members of the band separate from one another.

The characters' contemporary language and Pitar's thorough knowledge of modern-day history, philosophy and science add to the grotesque humor of the novel, while his two friends quote classical Roman literature and Chinese sayings. The book was published by Viennese publisher FZA Verlag in October 2008. Between 2008 and 2010, several Austrian and German critics and writers published reviews of the novel.

== Background ==
Ebner first considered writing a novel in which prehistoric characters have present-day knowledge and a modern language in 2006. Believing that this topic would not suffice for a long novel, he initially did not pursue the idea. In February 2008 Ebner won the Wiener Werkstattpreis in the categories of short story and essay—in addition to the prize money the organizer of the award, the Viennese publishing house FZA, offers to the winner to publish a 100-page book. Hence Ebner wrote and finalized his narrative within four months. The book was published in the October of the same year with the German title Hominide. The publisher introduced the work to the public with a public reading in Vienna.

The novel consists of seven chapters, "Day 1" to "Day 7", with the action of each chapter occurring on consecutive days. The chapters refer to the seven days of the biblical Creation. In comparison with other works of Ebner, Hominid is the first to be about a prehistoric subject. The author had already addressed topics of religious faith before, in the short stories “Der Schreiber von Aram (The Scribe of Aram)” and “Momentaufnahme (Snapshot)”, and frequently used a satirical style for his narratives.

== Plot synopsis ==
Hominid takes place several million years ago in the Central African transitional region between rainforest and savanna. The main characters are Australopithecus afarenses, an extinct, mostly tree-dwelling hominid that existed before the use of tools and fire. The story is told through first-person narration by the protagonist, Pitar. In deliberating his social and natural environment, Pitar decides to lead his band to civilization: “Hence I decided to shed some light on the darkness, to light a candle following the motto Let there be light and so on.” His linguistic capacity, thoughts and speech correspond to those of modern man, and he also is knowledgeable about history, politics, philosophy and literature. Intermittent comments made by Pitar concerning a particular prospect or artifact that has not been invented or developed yet add to the humor of the grotesque scenario. Pitar's close friends are Carpediem, who enunciates Latin phrases and quotes the writers of Classical Antiquity, and Lao, who frequently refers to Chinese philosophy.

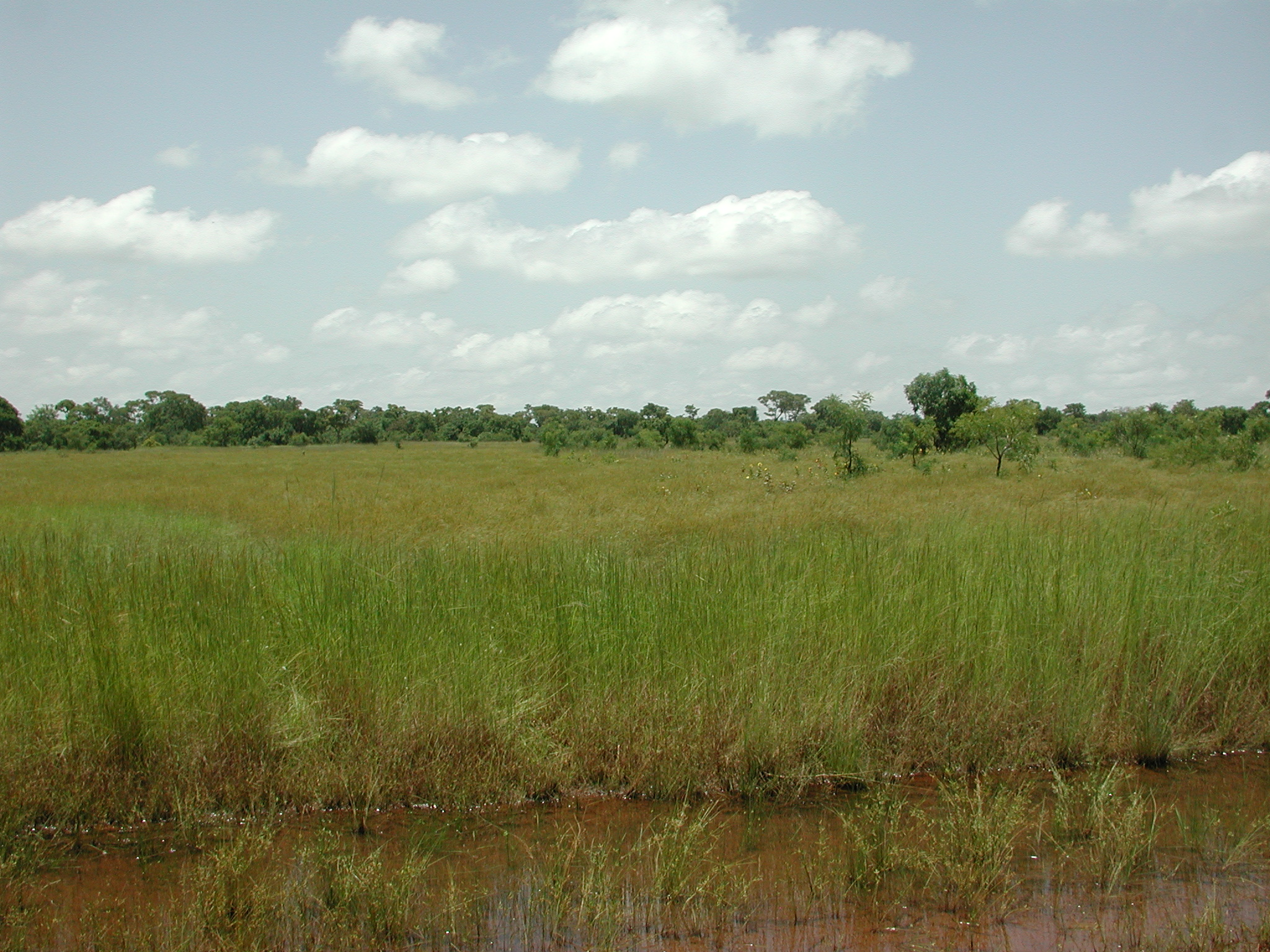
Grass savanna in Northern Central Africa

Although it is difficult to convince his fellow Hominidae to follow him, Pitar manages to persuade the patriarchal leader of the clan, Costello, who has taken command from the recently deceased Thorn. The band builds windbreaks to help them descend more often from the trees, thus exposing them to a higher risk of being attacked by predators on the ground. A rivalry emerges between Costello and another band member, Re, who not only questions the leading abilities of the present alpha but also desires Costello's females. To alleviate the escalating debate of authority, Pitar tries to implement a parliament to settle disputes peacefully. Costello, however, considers the parliament to be a forum in which he can consolidate his power, citing famous speeches by Winston Churchill and Abraham Lincoln; the other members ruin this noble idea with their lack of discipline and ostentatious indifference.

One of the subplots of the novel details the budding love between Pitar and Maluma, a female member of the band. Costello perceives the group of females as his personal harem, but when Maluma falls in love with Pitar she breaks off her relationship with him. On each day, the characters discover new insights and artefacts, but seek rest from their exhaustion by the seventh day. This repose, however, is disrupted by the attack of a saber-toothed cat. Several members of the band are killed, including Costello, thus enabling Re to assume power. Pitar and Maluma decide to leave the band, stating, "We should leave in time, leave Re and his new Reich, which, when I'm taking into account Thorn's previous reign, would be the Third over here." Pitar and Maluma head toward the savanna, an action which alludes to both the expulsion from paradise and the Out of Africa theory. Only odd-numbered chapters narrate the love story, which bookmarks the novel. Writer Karin Gayer mentions in her review that the love story of Pitar and Maluma, and its positioning within the text, offers "a second interpretation of the beginning and the end".

== Characters ==
In a conversation with the Viennese regional leader of publisher Arovell, Ebner revealed the hidden meanings of his characters' names.

- Akshaya: The name originates from Hindi (specifically Sanskrit) and signifies “the indomitable”. Akshaya is a female character with a firm personality, and belongs to the band although she often acts as an antepole in regard to Costello. In a certain sense she represents the matriarchal form of governance by daring to disagree with the alpha and making her own decisions.
- Bongo: Originates from the African people and language and is also used for place names in several African countries, also alluding to Adriano Celentanos film Bingo Bongo and a kind of forest antelope. The novel presents Bongo as a clownish, male juvenile who teases the other members of the band but is protected from backlashes by his youth and humor.
- Carpediem: Latin for "seize the day", literally meaning "pluck the day", which stems from a poem by Horace. Carpediem is Pitar's closest friend and uses Latin quotations and expressions.
- Costello: English-Italian surname. Costello is the patriarch of the band. Keen on remaining in power, he recognizes that Pitar's ideas might help him prevail. For this reason he supports Pitar.
- Djamila: A female character who belongs to Costello's harem. Her name stems from the Arabic language meaning "the pretty one".
- Ischa: A female character who belongs to Costello's harem. Together with Djamila she woos the clan leader. Her name stems from the Semitic languages meaning "woman".
- Konrad: Old High German for "bold or good adviser". Konrad is a follower of Re and acts as his speaker, also challenging and ridiculing Pitar's ideas.
- Lao: Depending on the intonation, the word is Chinese for "firm, solid" or "old". It is also an allusion to either or both the philosopher Lao-Tzu, author of the Tao Te Ching, or the Lao people who live in Southeast Asia. The character Lao quotes Chinese philosophers and is a friend of Pitar. When he leaves the band after the attack of the sabre-tooth, he goes in the direction of East Africa and Asia.
- Lucy: An allusion to Lucy, the skeleton of an Australopithecus afarensis specimen discovered in 1974 in Ethiopia. Lucy is the mother of most children in the band. At the end of the book she leaves for East Africa with Lao and Maluma.
- Maluma: Maluma is an artificial word from synesthesia, representing curvy and smooth shapes. She becomes the loving companion of Pitar. Through Maluma, Pitar discovers the power and the sweets of love.
- Manisha: This name stems from the Hindi and Sanskrit languages, signifying "the wise". In Hinduism, Manisha is the goddess of the mind. Among the clan's women, Manisha has a similar role as Lao has among the men. She easily holds her own in discussions with the males, and her reasoning is witty and logical.
- Pitar The protagonist's name stems from Sanskrit and means "father"; its intonation lies on the second syllable: "Pitár". Pitar narrates the story of which he is the main character.
- Re: Italian for "king", also an allusion to the ancient Egyptian sun god Re or Ra. Re is Costello's opponent and antagonist. An aggressive character, he perceives Pitar as an enemy because of Pitar's perceived support for the band's leader. He repeatedly defies Costello but does not dare to start an open revolt. The attack of the sabre-toothed cat, which kills Costello and some other members of the band, enables Re to become the leader at the end of the novel.
- Rhododendron: Greek for "rose tree", a genus of flowering plants in the family Ericaceae. The character Rhododendron is a male member of the band with an ecological attitude. Rhododendron is only a supporting actor in the story.
- Ruth: Hebrew for "companion". Ruth is a female band member with a distinctive strength of character. When the band is constructing their first windshield, she pushes a fervent discussion about labor law and commences a strike.
- Thorn: This name stems from the Germanic languages and is the denomination of the rune Thurisaz “Þ”, pronounced as “θ”. Thorn is the eldest of the clan and considered a sage. He appears only in the first two chapters, at the end of which he dies. From a dynastic point of view, he was Costello's predecessor.

== Major themes ==
The novel addresses hominization from an ironic point of view. Mankind's evolution from the ape-like Australopithecus afarenses to modern society with history, technology and cultural expression is compressed into only seven days. The strong allusion to faith is contrasted by numerous references to scientific insights. With the evolution of mankind starting in Central Africa, Lucy is the name given to the first skeleton of an Australopitecus afarensis found. The characters mention that Homo erectus would be the hominid species to tame fire. Orrorin and Toumaï represent two of the oldest-known hominin ancestors, while Aegyptopithecus zeuxis is one of the earliest primates. Through scientific references and a distinct ironic tone, Ingrid Reichel makes it clear in her review that the book cannot be taken in by any religion or fundamentalism.

While scholars know of patriarchal and matrifocal ancient societies, very little can be said about a society of a species, which is as remote as Australopithecus. On the basis of examples in today's chimpanzee and bonobo societies, Klaus Ebner introduced both patriarchal and matriarchal characters in the novel, Costello and Akshaya. Some of the female characters are very strong and self-conscious, such as Akshaya, who is so firm that even Costello retrocedes from her. While political power is controlled by the males, the social structure seems matrifocal and matrilineal, corresponding to the image of prehistoric societies exhibited by scholars.

Another theme is the love story between Pitar and Maluma. While the society of the band is depicted as driven by sexual attraction in a male hierarchy, the relationship between Pitar and Maluma leads them to break away from traditional habitudes. Pitar is not the alpha male, but he starts a love relationship on his own, in which Maluma quits Costello's harem. The love story demonstrates love as a quite late cultural achievement of mankind. In addition, Karin Gayer emphasizes the significance of Pitar's and Maluma's love against the religious component in defining the love story and its positioning within the storyline as another concept "of the beginning and the end".

== Style ==
Hominid is a short novel which contains one single and linear storyline. However, it is subdivided into seven chapters, each standing for a narrated day. The satirical character of the book stems from the underlying grotesque scenario, the speeches of Pitar and his fellow hominids, the mentioning of artifacts which have not yet been invented, and the numerous allusions to world history and literature.

Steffen Roye from the German literary magazine Verstärker states in the title of his book review that Ebner has the characters of his story "talk as if they were modern-day juveniles". When it comes to allusions, a number of them consist of quotes, usually from classical Latin writers.

Ebner's writing style is rich in detail, as Ingrid Reichel states, and she pinpoints the "artist of the word". Similar judgments have been made by other critics when they reviewed the preceding works by Ebner, such as Wolfgang Ratz about Auf der Kippe or Julia Rafael about Lose.

== Reception and criticism ==
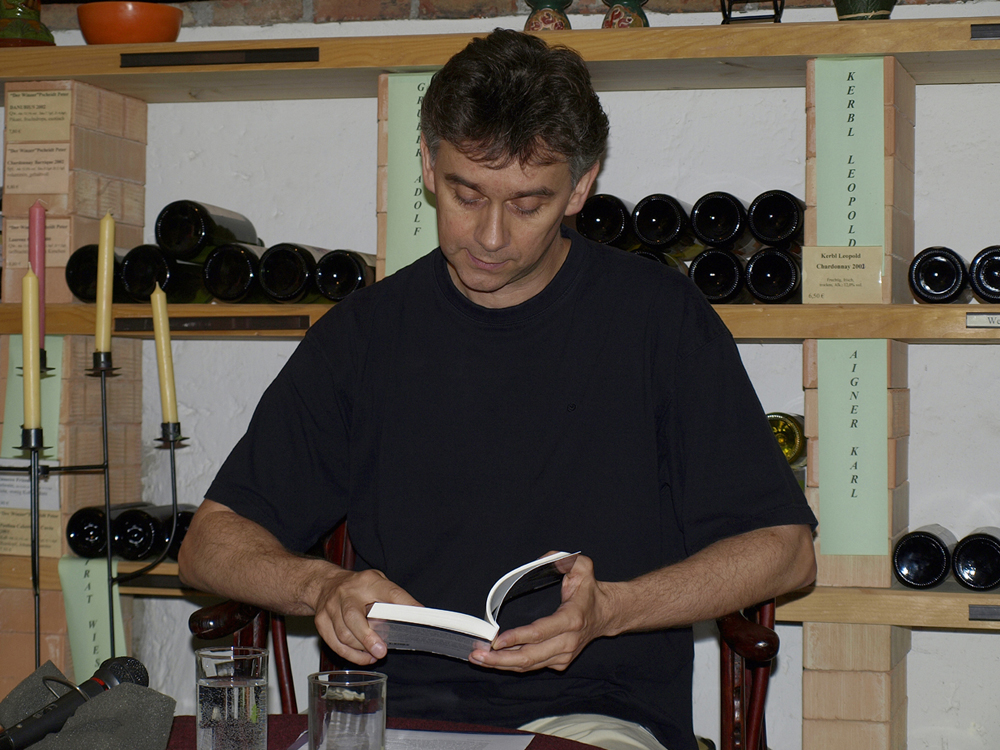
Klaus Ebner at a presentation

Heinz Gerstinger thinks the book is a "history of the awakening of the spirit of mankind". The author has the events glided "into the playful by his gently irony". Several reviewers underline the narrative's ironic and satirical aspect, including the names of the characters, Latin quotations and idioms as well as the parallelism between the seven days of Creation and scientific hominization. Ingrid Reichel points out the perfect publication date, just in time for the 150th anniversary of Charles Darwin's theory of evolution. Similarly to other reviewers who had written about Ebner's earlier books, she highlights the sophisticated use of a detail-rich language which is "steeped in subtle and sensitive humor".

Despite many explicit allusions to several world religions, Ingrid Reichel states that the novel is a book for “readers with humor, for reasoners (…), for darwinists, on no account for creationists, to a lesser extent for people of faith, but rather for atheists, … and fundamentalists drop out entirely”. Another aspect is identified by Karin Gayer when pinpointing the parallel evolution of the patriarchal hierarchy in the narrated society and the alluded social matriarchy, the first resembling chimpanzee communities and the second representing those of bonobos. In addition, she points out the strength of the women characters. She declares that at the time of the Australopithecus, neither chimpanzees nor bonobos existed, but "the author is not interested in paleoanthropologic precisenesses—he is interested in mirroring our society, in exposing human behavior". She compares Costello with the alpha of a community of chimpanzees and a classical manager, and Akshaya with bonobo females and a modern-day career woman. With regard to these underlying comparisons, Gayer says, "On another level we are struck by the permanent notional commingling of the simian and the human, a composition which leaves us pensive and asks the legitimate question where we, who consider ourselves sapiens in a double sense, should finally classify man."

The multitudinous allusions to well-known and lesser-known books, movies and sayings cause contradicting receptions. While Heinz Gerstinger and Ingrid Reichel explicitly highlight the comical effect of the insinuations, the German critic Steffen Roye regards them as sometimes "exaggerated" and says, "As the story develops, it becomes more and more like a revue." The numerous expressions in foreign languages, especially in Latin, remain untranslated in the first edition. In her review, Ingrid Reichel invites the publisher to add a glossary to a new edition. The author subsequently released such a glossary on his own website.

== Bibliography ==
=== Primary sources ===
- Ebner, Klaus. Hominide. Vienna: FZA Verlag, 2008. ISBN 978-3-9502299-7-4
- Ebner, Klaus. Hominide, Klagenfurt: Wieser Verlag 2016. ISBN 978-3-99029-206-8

=== Secondary sources ===
- (in Catalan) Carbonell, Eudald; Moyà, Salvador; Sala, Robert; Corbella, Josep. Sapiens. el llarg camí dels homínids cap a la intel·ligència. Edicions 62, Barcelona 2000.
- (German) Gamsjäger, Sonja. “Gespräch mit Autoren. Dr. Sonja Gamsjäger im Gespräch mit den Autoren Martin Dragosits und Klaus Ebner”. In: Arovell-Kulturzeitschrift. Musik&Literatur&Kunst. Nr. 72. Gosau-Salzburg-Wien, 2009. p. 16-18.
- (German) Gayer, Karin. “Schöne neue Welt der Hominiden”. In: Kultur Online, Verein artCore, Bregenz/Binz 10.07.2009. Retrieved on 2010-07-28.
- (German) Gerstinger, Heinz. “Review on Hominide”. In: Literarisches Österreich. Nr. 01/09. Vienna, 2009. p. 21-22.
- (German) Reichel, Ingrid. “Es lebe die Satire!” In: Etcetera. Nr. 36. St. Pölten, 2009. p. 76. ISSN 1682-9115.
- (German) Roye, Steffen. “Darwins Nightmare – Klaus Ebner lässt seine „Hominiden“ reden wie junge Leute von heute.” In: Verstärker Online. Berlin, 2010. Retrieved on 2010-07-28.
