= Art-Club =

Art-Club was an association of artists during the postwar period in Vienna, Austria, in 1946–1959.

== History ==
Art-Club was formed with the intention of fighting for the autonomy of modern art. This rather late standpoint in art history should be viewed in the light of the conditions dictated by Nazi art ideals right after Anschluss. The autonomy of the arts had been soiled by the concept of entartete Kunst and needed to be emphasized. For a decade marked by violence, the free picture had been oppressed as well as the free word.

== Some groups ==
Unlike Gruppe 47 in Germany, the Austrian Art-Club was not specially aspired to literature, though pronounced writers like Ilse Aichinger and Ernst Jandl were members, as was H. C. Artmann before he got more occupied by the distinctive Wiener Gruppe. (Ingeborg Bachmann however preferred Gruppe 47). Art-Club wanted to be a continuous platform for young painters, sculptors, authors and musicians. Different artist studios were meeting places as well as city cafés. Joint exhibitions could take place in Wiener Secession. The idiom of one group of members reminded critics of Surrealism. Johann Muschik characterized in the late 1950s these particular members Wiener Schule des Phantastischen Realismus (Vienna School of Fantastic Realism). Abstract painting occurred as well, for instance in the works of the young Hundertwasser, but also in a group called Hundsgruppe with among others Arnulf Rainer and Maria Lassnig.

== Well-known members ==
- Friedrich Achleitner
- Ilse Aichinger
- H. C. Artmann
- Konrad Bayer
- Maria Biljan-Bilger
- Arik Brauer
- Jeannie Ebner
- Paul Flora
- Hans Fronius
- Ernst Fuchs
- Elfriede Gerstl
- Albert Paris Gütersloh
- Rudolf Hausner
- Wolfgang Hollegha
- Friedensreich Hundertwasser
- Wolfgang Hutter
- Ernst Jandl
- Maria Lassnig
- Anton Lehmden
- Friederike Mayröcker
- Josef Mikl
- Ferry Radax
- Arnulf Rainer
- Rudolph von Ripper
- Hans Weigel
- Susanne Wenger

== Literature ==
- Die Wiener Schule des Phantastischen Realismus, exh. cat. (Hannover, Kestner-Ges., 1965)
