= Friedrich Achleitner =

Austrian poet and architecture critic (1930–2019)

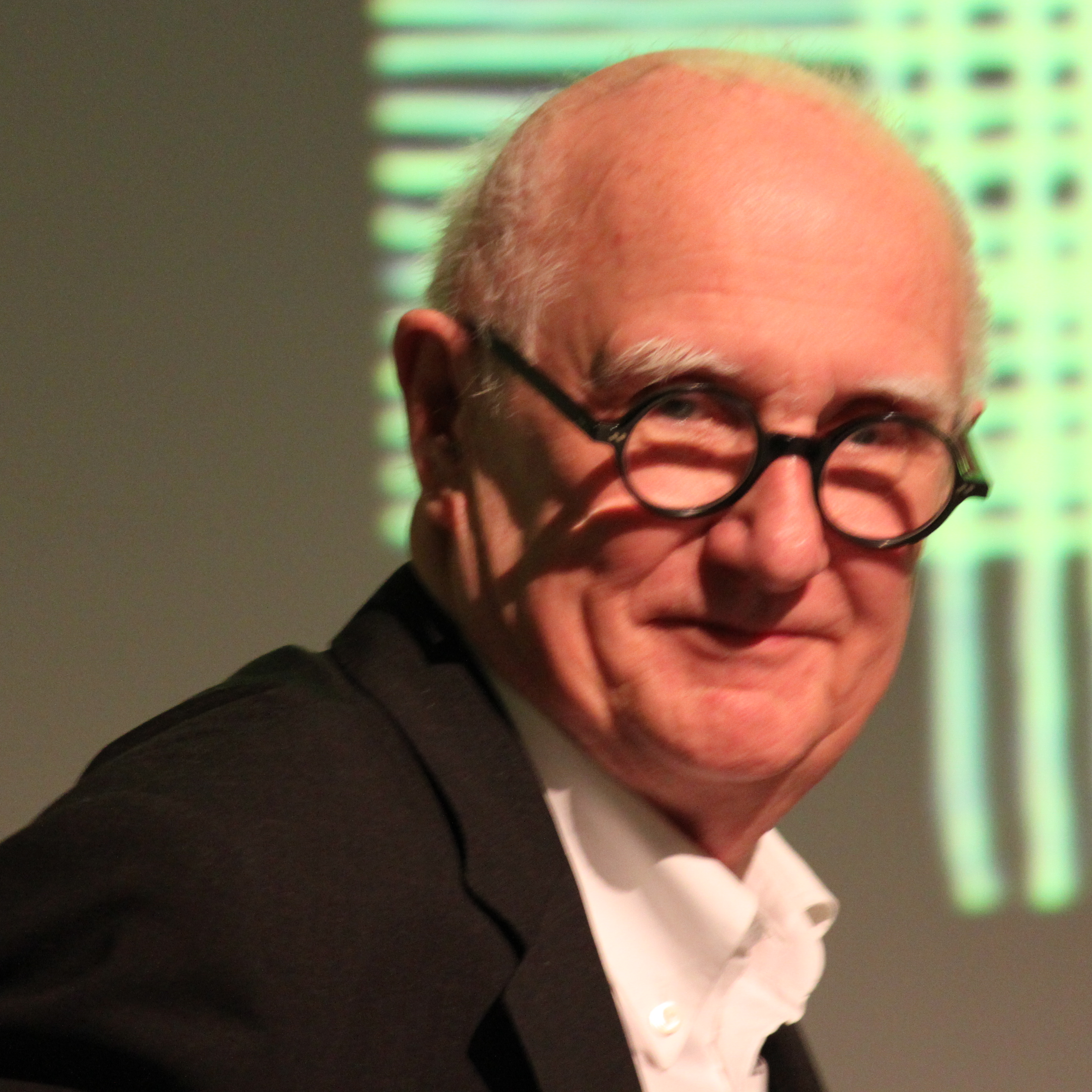
- Achleitner in 2010
- Born: 23 May 1930; Schalchen, Austria
- Died: 27 March 2019 (aged 88); Vienna, Austria
- Education: Academy of Fine Arts Vienna
- Occupations: Poet; Architecture critic; Academic teacher
- Organization: University of Applied Arts Vienna
- Awards: Schelling Architecture Theory Prize

Friedrich Achleitner (23 May 1930 – 27 March 2019) was an Austrian poet and architecture critic. As a member of the Wiener Gruppe, he wrote concrete poems and experimental literature. His magnum opus is a multi-volume documentation of 20th-century Austrian architecture. Written over several decades, Achleitner made a personal visit to each building described. He was a professor of the history and theory of architecture at the University of Applied Arts Vienna.

== Life and career ==
Achleitner was born in Schalchen, Upper Austria, the son of a farmer. He attended the Höhere Bundesgewerbeschule in Salzburg, and then studied architecture at the Academy of Fine Arts Vienna from 1950 to 1953 with Clemens Holzmeister. He supervised architectural projects until 1958, such as the restoration of the Rosenkranzkirche in Vienna.

In 1955, Achleitner joined the Wiener Gruppe, which had at its center H. C. Artmann, Konrad Bayer, Gerhard Rühm and Oswald Wiener, henceforth participated in its literary cabarets, and wrote poems in dialect, montages, and concrete poems. His experimental quadratroman was published in 1973.

He began to work as an architecture critic for Austrian daily papers, from 1961 anonymously for the Abendzeitung, then especially from 1962 to 1972 for Die Presse. He established a new quality of thinking about architecture. From 1961, he lectured at the Academy of Fine Arts Vienna about the history of building construction. In 1983, he was appointed professor of the history and theory of architecture at the University of Applied Arts Vienna, a post he held until 1998.

He began his magnum opus, Österreichische Architektur im 20. Jahrhundert, a guide to Austrian architecture in the 20th century in several volumes, in 1965. The first volume appeared in 1980 and the fifth shortly after his 80th birthday. A sequel about Lower Austria remained unwritten. He visited each building personally and documented it. The archive is held by the Architekturzentrum Wien. The book is known as Der Achleitner among professionals.

Among his many awards, Achleitner received the Schelling Architecture Theory Prize for 2008.

== Death ==
Achleitner died in Vienna on 27 March 2019 at the age of 88. He was cremated at Feuerhalle Simmering.

== Publications ==
His works include:

- prosa, konstellationen, montagen, dialektgedichte, studien (1970)
- quadratroman (1973)
- Österreichische Architektur im 20. Jahrhundert (from 1880)
- Nieder mit Fischer von Erlach (1986)
- KAAAS. Dialektgedichte (1991)
- Die Plotteggs kommen. Ein Bericht (1995)
- einschlafgeschichten (2003)
- wiener linien (2004)
- und oder oder und (2006)
