= Christine Werner =

Austrian writer (born 1954)

Christine Werner (born 26 August 1954 in Vienna) is an Austrian writer. She is the author of dramas, literary cabaret, radio plays, net art, photographic art, poetry and narrative prose.

== Biography ==
Christine Werner was born in 1954 in Vienna, Austria; today she is living in Vienna and Styria. In her own words, she is an author, an action artist and an artist for the Net.

She is a playwright, and she writes literary cabaret, poetry, radio plays, short stories and novels. Christine Werner is a member of the Austrian authors' associations Grazer Autorenversammlung (GAV), Literary Circle of Linz and ÖDA (Austrian Authors writing in Dialect). She received several subsidies for literature from the Austrian government and presented her texts to the public in Austria and Germany.

== Awards and Literary Prizes ==
- 1996 Literary Contest Vienna
- 1997 Luitpold Stern Prize
- 1997 Subsidy for Playwrights by the Austrian government
- 1997 GEDOK Award Wiesbaden
- 1998 Travel Subsidy for Literature by the Austrian government

== Works ==
- Meine Schuhe eingraben, poetry, Publisher G. Grasl, Baden bei Wien 1996
- Eine Handbreit über dem Knie, novel, Resistenz Verlag, Linz/Vienna 1999
- Wien ist nicht Chicago, novel, Resistenz Verlag, Linz/Vienna 2000
- fern & weh, Ein Reisefieber, short stories, Sisyphus Verlag, Vienna 2002
- Eine Handvoll Himbeeren, radio play, Austrian Radio Ö1, Vienna 2002
- Verdammt, novella, Arovell Verlag, Gosau 2008
