= Arovell Verlag =

Arovell Verlag is an Austrian publishing house for contemporary literature. It has been founded in 1991 by the Austrian writer, artist and musician Paul Jaeg. Today, Jaeg is still the directing proprietor, while Thomas Gamsjäger is CEO.

Each year, Arovell publishes between ten and twenty new books. Some authors, such as Peter Paul Wiplinger, have already several books with Arovell, but others use the publishing house as a platform to publish their first book(s).

Arovell publishes contemporary literature in the German language. They focus on short prose, stories and poetry. The covers of all books edited by Arovell show a painting respectively a section from a painting by Paul Jaeg.

In addition, Arovell publishes a magazine about literature, music and art, which contains information about new books and public events. The magazine also presents short texts from the books edited by Arovell.

The publisher organizes literary, musical and artistic events especially in Upper Austria and Salzburg, to a lesser extent also in Vienna.

Arovell's headquarters lies in Gosau in Upper Austria and has subsidiaries in Vienna and Salzburg.

== Published authors (extract) ==
- Hans Dieter Aigner
- Peter Assmann
- de:Reinhold Aumaier
- Klaus Ebner
- Karin Gayer
- Constantin Göttfert
- Fritz Huber
- Paul Jaeg
- de:Christoph Janacs
- de:Günther Kaip
- de:Wolfgang Kauer
- de:Hermann Knapp
- Dorothea Macheiner
- de:Dirk Ofner
- de:Wolfgang Pollanz
- de:Fritz Popp
- de:Herbert Reiter
- de:Christine Roiter
- de:Leopold Spoliti
- de:Nikolai Vogel
- de:Wolfgang Wenger
- Christine Werner
- Peter Paul Wiplinger
