= Literatur und Kritik =

The Austrian literary magazine Literatur und Kritik (Literature and Critical Reviews) was founded in April 1966 by the Austrian writers Rudolf Henz, Gerhard Fritsch, and Paul Kruntorad as successor of the literary publication Wort in der Zeit, which had existed since 1955.

== Profile ==
Compared to its predecessor, Literatur und Kritik printed more texts written by young authors and much more literature from Central and East European countries.

A study by the German scholar Renate Langer argued that the magazine was conceived originally as an official literary magazine of the Austrian state and thus received public subsidies from the first day on. Until the end of the 1980s, the magazine was dogged by this reputation.

Since its founding, Literatur und Kritik has been edited by the Salzburg publishing house Otto Müller Verlag, for several years now as five double issue per year. Scholar Klaus Zeyringer names it as one of the most interesting and richest literary magazines in German speaking countries. As of 2010 the print run of Literatur und Kritik was around 4,000.

Editors in chief were first Jeannie Ebner and eventually Kurt Klinger. In 1991, Karl-Markus Gauß became the new editor, together with publisher Arno Kleibel, and designed new characteristics for the magazine. For example, he introduced the new category Cultural Letters with essays and feuilletons covering cultural and historico-cultural topics. He gave more weight to discussion of the literatures of Central Europe and international literature. Additionally he managed to interest a younger generation of writers in collaborating.

The 40 Year Anniversary issue gives insight into texts published during the first twenty-five years of the magazine, e.g. by Ilse Aichinger, Ingeborg Bachmann, Italo Calvino, Elias Canetti, Paul Celan, Erich Fried, Alfred Gesswein, Peter Henisch, Friederike Mayröcker, Robert Menasse, Peter Rosei, Peter Turrini, and Czesław Miłosz.

== Dossiers ==
Most issues of Literatur und Kritik comprise a dossier about special topics of about the literature of a chosen country. Among others, dossiers about Moldavia, Sorbian Literature, Portugal, Ukraine, Guatemala, South Tyrol, Occitanian Literature, Sinti and Roma, Bulgaria, and Yiddish Literature have been published.

== Cultural Letters ==
The category Cultural Letters was introduced by Karl-Markus Gauß. Essays and feuilletons cover cultural topics in a broad sense. Every year, Literatur und Kritik publishes two to three Cultural Letters features. Writers such as Beppo Beyerl, Max Blaeulich, Manfred Chobot, Klaus Ebner, Leopold Federmair, Andrea Grill, Drago Jančar, Michael Scharang, Wolfgang Sréter, Daniela Strigl, Christian Teissl, and Manfred Wieninger have written cultural essays for the magazine.

== Poetry ==
Since 2005, the first double issue of the year has published new poetry. The editors are committed to presenting a broad variety of contemporary poetry.

== Magazine in Magazine ==
The international concept of Magazine in Magazine allows a literary magazine to present itself via another literary magazine based in another country (and in another language). Chosen texts are translated and speak for themselves in the target country. The original idea stems from the writers group of the magazine Apokalipsa in Ljubljana in Slovenia. Initial projects brought together Literatur und Kritik with magazines in Slovenia, Hungary, Montenegro, Poland and Croatia.

== Reviews ==
Every issue contains reviews of recently published literary books. As a specialty, the so-called Controversy deserves mention, in which two authors review the same book from different viewpoints. Well-known Germanists such as Waltraud Anna Mitgutsch, Wendelin Schmidt-Dengler, Daniela Strigl and Klaus Zeyringer have written reviews for Literatur und Kritik.

== See also ==
- List of magazines in Austria
