= Hominid (disambiguation) =

A hominid is an ape in the family Hominidae, i.e. a great ape.

Hominid may also refer to:

- Hominid (novel), a 2008 novel by Klaus Ebner
- Hominid (band), an American post-punk noise band formed c. 2002
- Hominids, a 2002 novel by Robert J. Sawyer in The Neanderthal Parallax trilogy
