= Georg Bydlinski =

Austrian writer

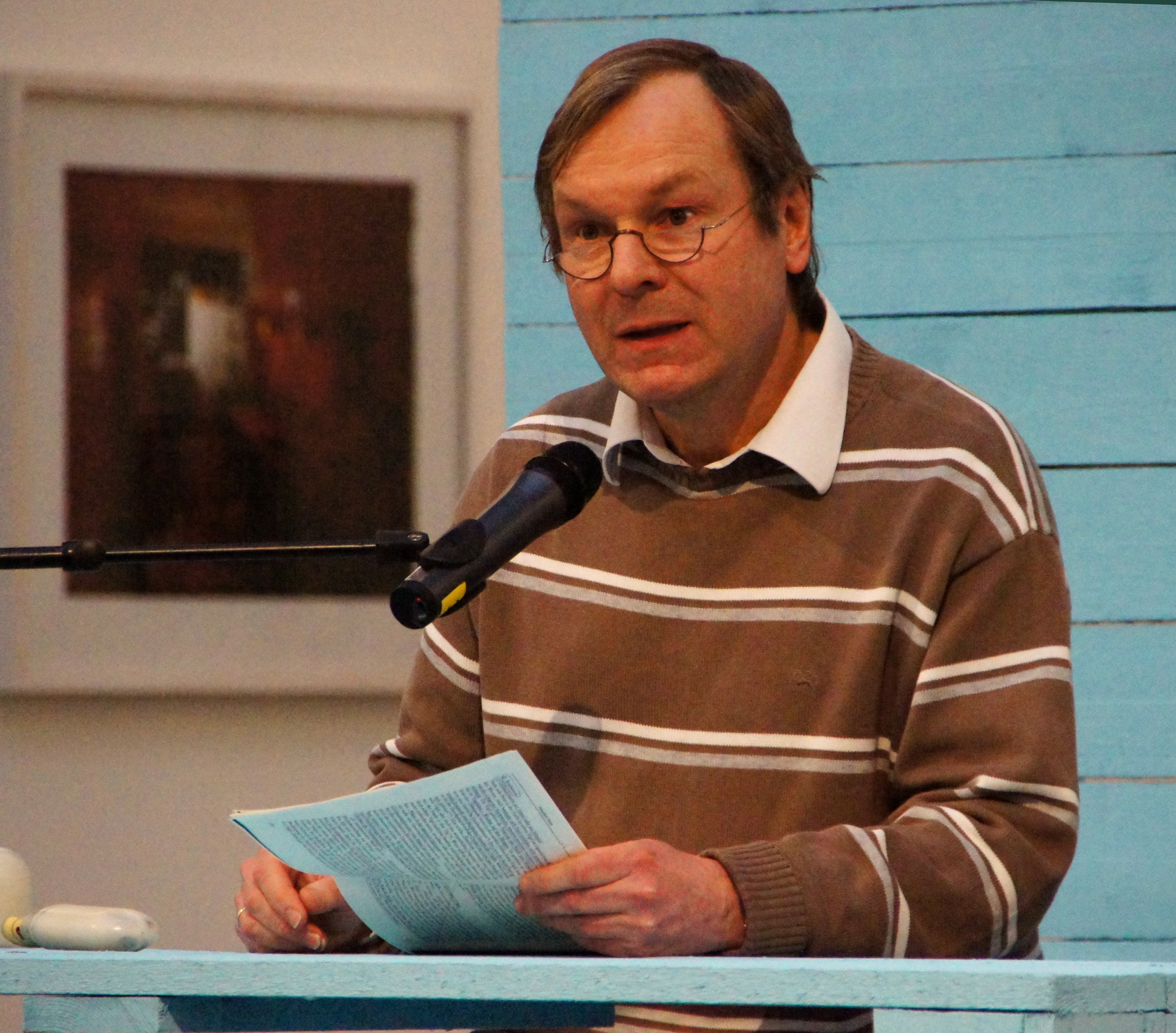
Georg Bydlinski, Vienna 2013.

Georg Bydlinski (born 30 May 1956 in Graz) is an Austrian writer.

== Life ==
After studying English literature and religious instruction, Bydlinski has lived as a freelance writer in Mödling since 1982. In 1990, he participated at the Festival of German-Language Literature in Klagenfurt.

He has written many novels, children's books and poems, co-founded a small publishing house, and is an editor of anthologies as well as a translator.

Georg Bydlinski is a member of "IG Autorinnen Autoren", Grazer Autorenversammlung, Österreichischer Schriftstellerverband, "Literaturkreis Podium" and "Friedrich-Bödecker-Kreis Hannover".

Since 2013, he has been working together with the producer Thomas Raber.

== Awards ==
- 1982 "Theodor-Körner-Förderpreis" (Theodor Körner Young Writers Award)
- 1987 "Theodor-Körner-Förderpreis"
- 1993 "Theodor-Körner-Förderpreis"
- 1993 "Kinderbuchpreis der Stadt Wien" (Children's Book Prize of the City of Vienna)
- 2001 "Österreichischer Staatspreis für Kinderlyrik" (Austrian State Prize for Children's Poetry)
- 2005 "Österreichischer Staatspreis für Kinder- und Jugendliteratur" (Austrian State Prize for Children's Books)
- 2005 "Dulzinea-Lyrikpreis" (Dulzinea Poetry Award)
- 2012 "Friedrich-Bödecker-Preis" (2012 Friedrich Bödecker Prize)

== Books ==
- Pimpel und Pompel aus Limonadien, Vienna u. a. 1980
- Distelblüte, Wean u. a. 1981
- Das Entchen und der große Gungatz, Vienna u. a. 1981 (together with Käthe Recheis und Alicia Sancha)
- Der Mond heißt heute Michel, Vienna u. a. 1981
- Die Sprache bewohnen, Vienna u. a. 1981
- Hinwendung zu den Steinen, Vienna u. a. 1984
- Schritte, St. Georgen an d. Gusen 1984
- ... Weil wir Heinzelmännchen sind, Vienna u. a. 1984 (together with Piotr Stolarczyk)
- Kopf gegen Beton, Mödling 1986
- Der himbeerrote Drache, Vienna 1988 (together with Piotr Stolarczyk)
- Landregen, Vienna u. a. 1988
- Satellitenstadt, Baden-Baden 1988
- Was sich Gott alles ausgedacht hat, Düsseldorf 1988 (together with Brigitte Smith)
- Ein Krokodil geht in die Stadt, Vienna u. a. 1990 (together with Piotr Stolarczyk)
- Guten Morgen, die Nacht ist vorbei, Vienna 1991 (together with Winfried Opgenoorth)
- Im Halblicht, Vienna 1991
- Wurfparabel, Vienna 1991
- Die bunte Brücke, Freiburg u. a. 1992
- Der Hinzel-Henzel-Hunzelmann, Vienna 1992
- Ein Krokodil entdeckt die Nacht, Vienna 1992
- Der Schattenspringer und das Monster, Vienna 1993
- Krok bleibt am Ball, Vienna 1994 (together with Piotr Stolarczyk)
- Bärenschüler, Vienna u. a. 1995 (together with Franz Hoffmann)
- Das Gespenst im Badezimmer, Vienna 1995
- Katzenpostamt, Vienna u. a. 1995 (together with Franz Hoffmann)
- Tierfeuerwehr, Vienna u. a. 1995 (together with Franz Hoffmann)
- Vogelzirkus, Vienna u. a. 1995 (together with Franz Hoffmann)
- Wintergras, Mödling 1995
- Die 3 Streithasen, Vienna 1996 (together with Marianne Bors)
- Affentheater, Vienna u. a. 1997 (together with Franz Hoffmann)
- Hasenfußball, Vienna u. a. 1997 (together with Franz Hoffmann)
- Hundepolizei, Vienna u. a. 1997 (together with Franz Hoffmann)
- Krok geht in die Schule, Esslingen u. a. 1997 (together with Piotr Stolarczyk)
- Schweinchenexpress, Vienna u. a. 1997 (together with Franz Hoffmann)
- Immer diese Nervensägen!, Vienna 1998
- Bald bist du wieder gesund, Vienna u. a. 1999 (together with Birgit Antoni)
- Zimmer aus Licht, Vienna 1999
- Daniel hilft wie ein Großer, Vienna u. a. 2000 (together with Birgit Antoni)
- Der dicke Kater Pegasus, Vienna 2000 (together with Carola Holland)
- Höre mich, auch wenn ich nicht rufe, Nettetal 2000
- Schneefänger, Vienna 2001
- Stadt, Rand, Nacht, Vienna 2002
- Wasserhahn und Wasserhenne, Vienna 2002
- Sieben auf der Suche, Vienna 2003
- Lindas Blues, St. Pölten 2004
- Der Zapperdockel und der Wok, Vienna 2004 (together with Jens Rassmus)
- Ein Gürteltier mit Hosenträgern, Vienna 2005
- Hier ist alles irgendwie anders, Vienna u. a. 2005 (together with Birgit Antoni)
- Schattenschaukel, Vienna 2006
- Wie ein Fisch, der fliegt, Vienna 2006
- Das kleine Buch für gute Freunde, Düsseldorf 2007 (together with Katharina Bußhoff)
- Das kleine Buch zum Trösten, Düsseldorf 2007
- Die Bibel für Kinder und ihre Erwachsenen, Hörbuch, Vienna 2011 (together with Birgit Bydlinski)

=== Editorship ===
- Weißt du, daß die Bäume reden, Vienna u. a. 1983 (together with Käthe Recheis)
- Der Wünschelbaum, Vienna u. a. 1984
- Freundschaft mit der Erde, Vienna u. a. 1985 (together with Käthe Recheis)
- Mödlinger Lesebuch, Mödling 1985
- Angst hat keine Flügel, Mödling 1987
- Auch das Gras hat ein Lied, Vienna u. a. 1988 (together with mit Käthe Recheis)
- Die Erde ist eine Trommel, Freiburg u. a. 1988 (together with Käthe Recheis)
- Unter der Wärme des Schnees, Mödling u. a. 1988 (together with Franz M. Rinner)
- Zieh einen Kreis aus Gedanken, Vienna 1990 (together with Käthe Recheis)
- Ich höre deine Stimme im Wind, Freiburg im Breisgau u. a. 1994 (together with Käthe Recheis)
- Übermalung der Finsternis, Mödling u. a. 1994 (together with Franz M. Rinner)
- Kreisender Adler, singender Stern, Munich u. a. 1996 (together with Käthe Recheis)
- Der neue Wünschelbaum, Vienna 1999

== Translations ==
- Guck-Guck, Vienna u. a. 1996 (together with Debi Gliori)
- Gute Nacht, Vienna u. a. 1996 (together with Debi Gliori)
- Ich hab dich lieb, Vienna u. a. 1996 (together with Debi Gliori)
- Ein Löffel für dich, Vienna u. a. 1996 (together with Debi Gliori)
