= Gerhard Rühm =

Austrian author, composer and visual artist

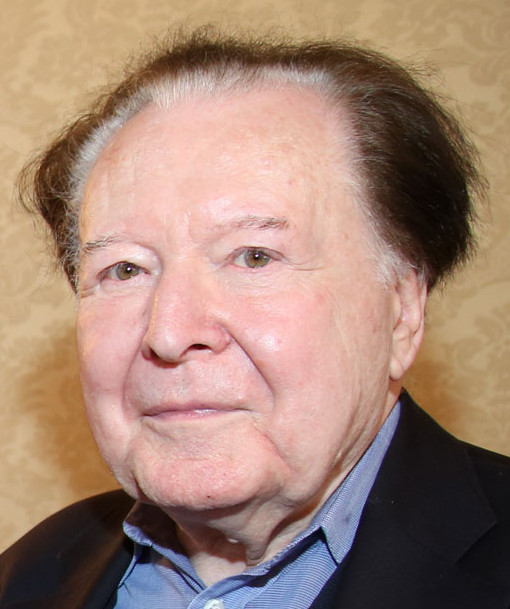
- Rühm in 2015
- Born: 12 February 1930; Vienna, Austria

Gerhard Rühm (born 12 February 1930) is an Austrian author, composer and visual artist.

== Biography ==
Rühm was born in Vienna. He studied the piano and music composition at the University of Music and Performing Arts in Vienna. Following his studies he undertook private lessons with the twelve-tone composer Josef Matthias Hauer. Since the beginning of the 1950s Rühm has produced sound poetry, spoken word, visual poetry, photomontages and books. He is a co-founder of the Wiener Gruppe (Vienna Group), with Friedrich Achleitner, Hans Carl Artmann, Konrad Bayer und Oswald Wiener, as well as the publisher of an anthology by the same name. From 1972–1996 Rühm taught as a professor at the University of Fine Arts, Hamburg and from 1978–1982 he acted as president of the Grazer Autorenversammlung.

His artistic production is inspired by August Stramm, Kurt Schwitters, Gertrude Stein, Carl Einstein und Paul Scheerbart. Rühm's works are often located at the border between music, language, gestures and the visual. His audible works are outstanding examples of innovative radio plays and acoustic art. During a sojourn in Lebanon he became interested in eastern musical styles.

In addition to producing his own work, which has been recognized by numerous awards and prizes. Rühm is also the administrator of the estate of Franz Richard Behrens and is the publisher of the works of Konrad Bayer. Since 1978 he has been a member of the Freie Akademie der Künste in Hamburg. In 2009 he was awarded the Alice Salomon Prize for Poetics and on January 25, 2010 he received an honorary doctorate from the University of Cologne.

His son is the photographer and director David Rühm.

== Prizes ==
- 1976 – Austrian Appreciation Prize for Literature
- 1977 – Karl Sczuka Prize
- 1984 – Hörspielpreis der Kriegsblinden (War Blinder Audio Play Prize (for Wald. Ein deutsches Requiem)
- 1984 – Literature Prize of Vienna
- 1991 – Austrian State Prize for Literature
- 1991 – Medal of Honour of Vienna
- 2007 – Alice Salomon Prize for Poetics
- 2007 – Gold Decoration of Honour for Services to the Republic of Austria
- 2010 – Honorary Doctorate, University of Cologne
- 2013 – Austrian Decoration for Science and Art
- 2014 – Award of the City of Vienna, Art
- 2015 – Karl Sczuka Prize (prize for cutting-edge works of radio art)
- 2022 – America Award in Literature

== Collected works ==
- Gesammelte Werke. Published by Michael Fisch. ISBN 978-3-88221-515-1
- Volume 1.1 and 1.2: poems. published by Michael Fisch. Parthas Verlag, Berlin 2005. ISBN 978-3-88221-516-8
- Volume 2.1: visual poetics. published by Monika Lichtenfeld. Parthas Verlag, Berlin 2006. ISBN 978-3-88221-517-5
- Volume 2.2: visual music. published by Monika Lichtenfeld. Parthas Verlag, Berlin 2006. ISBN 978-3-88221-526-7
- Volume 3.1: audible music. published by Monika Lichtenfeld. Matthes & Seitz, Berlin 2013. ISBN 978-3-88221-520-5
- Volume 3.2: audio pieces. published by Paul Pechmann. Matthes & Seitz, Berlin, forthcoming in autumn 2014. ISBN 978-3-88221-519-9
- Volume 4.1: prose texts. published by Michael Fisch. Matthes & Seitz, Berlin, forthcoming in autumn 2015.
- Volume 4.2: image history. published by Thomas Eder. Matthes & Seitz, Berlin, forthcoming in autumn 2014.
- Volume 5: plays. published by Michael Fisch and Monika Lichtenfeld. Matthes & Seitz, Berlin 2010. ISBN 978-3-88221-518-2
- Volume 6.1 and 6.2: sound poems, composition for piano.
- Volume 7: melodramas, songs, chansons.
- Volume 8.1 and 8.2: sculptural works.
- Volume 9: theoretical writing.
- Volume 10: supplement.

This edition of work comprises 10 volumes in 16 books, and has been published since the fifth volume by Matthes & Seitz Berlin.

== Sound Recordings ==
- Interpretation of Josef Matthias Hauer: Sieben kleine Stücke für Klavier op.3, Fünf Hölderlin-Lieder op. 6, Sechs Zwölftonspiele, Gerhard Rühm (Klavier) and Adelina Rühm (Sopran), Amadeo AVRS 3013, Vienna, LP 1953
- ich küsse heiß den warmen sitz – gerhard rühm spielt und singt eigene chansons nach texten von rühm, bayer und wiener, da camera song sm 95022, Heidelberg, LP, 1969
- With Christian Attersee: Klaviertreiben, Gerhard Rühm (Klavier), Christian Attersee (Klavier), Galerie Heike Curtze 001, Privatpressung, Düsseldorf/Vienna, 1981
- bleistiftmusik. (= 1 MC in Kassette zu dem Buch-Objekt mit 14 Dias Bleistiftmusik). Köln: Edition Hundertmark 1982.
- das leben chopins und andere ton-dichtungen., Edition Block EB 115/6, Berlin, DoLP, 1988
- botschaft an die zukunft. Collected spoken texte. Reinbek: Rowohlt 1988. (= 1 MC in cassettes to the book Botschaft an die Zukunft) ISBN 3-498-05718-9
- Wiener Lieder und Gedichte. Graz und Vienna: Droschl 1993 (= CD in Kassette to the book Sämtliche Wiener Dialektdichtungen) ISBN 3-85420-344-6
- vom eintonstück zum damentango. Piano pieces and Melodrama 1950–1997. Edition Zeitton. Vienna: Österreichischer Rundfunk 1998. (= 3 CD in Kassette) CD 151
- Opheila and the words / Wald, ein deutsches Requiem / Kleine Geschichte der Zivilisation. Mainz: Wergo 1998. (= Ars Acustica in coproduction with the WDR.)
- verlier' nicht den kopf aus liebe. Collected Chansons from five decades. Edition Zeitton. Vienna: Österreichischer Rundfunk 2000. (= 3 CD in Kassette) CD 211
- With Konrad Bayer: gemeinschaftsarbeiten 1957–1962. Köln: supposé 2002. (= 1 CD in Pappschuber) ISBN 3-932513-33-9
- foetus. Graz: Literaturhaus 2003. (= Production by ORF-Landesstudio as part of Graz 2003. European Cultural Capital.)

== Bibliography ==
- Gerhard Rühm (with Friedrich Achleitner und Hans Carl Artmann): hosn rosn baa. Vienna: Frick 1959. without ISBN
- Gerhard Rühm: konstellationen. gomringer-press 1961. without ISBN
- Gerhard Rühm (publisher): Die Pegnitz-Schäfer. Georg Philipp Harsdörffer, Johann Klaj, Sigmund von Birken. Gedichte. Berlin: Gerhard 1964. without ISBN
- Gerhard Rühm: fenster Rowohlt 1968. without ISBN
- Gerhard Rühm: Thusnelda. Romanzen. Eremiten-Presse 1968. without ISBN
- Gerhard Rühm: DA. An alphabet book for children. Frankfurt am Main: Insel 1970. without ISBN
- Gerhard Rühm: Gesammelte Gedichte und visuelle Texte. Reinbek bei Hamburg: Rowohlt 1970. ISBN 3-498-05668-9
- Gerhard Rühm: Knochenspielzeug. Fairtales and fahles. With illustrations by Christian Ludwig Attersee. Eremiten-Presse 1970. without ISBN
- Gerhard Rühm: die frösche. Reinbek bei Hamburg: Rowohlt 1971. (= Rowohlt Taschenbuch 1460) ISBN 3-499-11460-7
- Gerhard Rühm: Die Reise nach Cythera. remiten-Presse 1971. ISBN 3-87365-017-7
- Gerhard Rühm: Ophelia und die Wörter. Collected plays 1954–1971. Darmstadt und Neuwied: Luchterhand 1972. without ISBN
- Gerhard Rühm: Mann und Frau. Darmstadt und Neuwied: Luchterhand 1972. without ISBN
- Gerhard Rühm: wahnsinn. München: Hanser 1973. ISBN 3-446-11777-6 (= with a record)
- Gerhard Rühm: Comic. Linz: Edition Neue Texte 1975. without ISBN
- Gerhard Rühm: bücher bilder bilder-bücher. Berlin
- Gerhard Rühm: Adelaides Locken. Illustration and commentary on a poem by Johann Heinrich Füssli. Köln and Berlin: Edition Hundertmark 1979. without ISBN
- Gerhard Rühm: automatische zeichnungen. Vienna: Museum Moderne Kunst 1979 (= Publikation 13 a) without ISBN
- Gerhard Rühm: fotomontagen. 1958–1966. Vienna: Museum Moderne Kunst 1979 (= Publikation 13 b) without ISBN
- Gerhard Rühm: hand- und körperzeichnungen. Vienna: Museum Moderne Kunst 1979 (= Publikation 13 c) without ISBN
- Gerhard Rühm: knochenspielzeug. Fairytales, fables and love stories. Düsseldorf: Eremiten-Presse 1979. ISBN 3-87365-138-6
- Gerhard Rühm: Zeichnungen aus dem Bestand der Galerie. München: Galerie Klewan 1979. without ISBN
- Gerhard Rühm: Selten gezeigte Kunst. group project from Berlin. (Gerhard Rühm and others) München: Galerie Klewan 1979. without ISBN
- Gerhard Rühm: super rekord 50 + 50. with Friedrich Achleitner. Linz: Edition Neue Texte 1980. ISBN 3-900292-17-5
- Gerhard Rühm: Abenteuer des Don Juan. Drawings 1980/81. Innsbruck, Vienna und Düsseldorf: Galerien Krinzinger und Curtze 1981. without ISBN
- Gerhard Rühm: Triumph des Herzens. Paintings, Kitsch and Curiosities (Gerhard Rühm and others) München: Galerie Klewan 1982. without ISBN
- Gerhard Rühm: Schriftzeichnungen 1956–1977. Hannover: Verlag Zweitschrift 1982. without ISBN
- Gerhard Rühm: Bleistiftmusik. (Book with 1 MC und 14 slides.) Köln: Edition Hundertmark 1982. without ISBN
- Gerhard Rühm: Salome. Adaptation of a text by Oscar Wilde. Frankfurt am Main: Verlag der Autoren 1983. ISBN 3-88661-057-8
- Gerhard Rühm: Zwölf Österreicher. (Gerhard Rühm and others) München: Galerie Klewan 1983. without ISBN
- Gerhard Rühm: Text Bild Musik. A show and read book. Edition Freibord, Wien 1984. without ISBN (=Freibord 41/42)
- Gerhard Rühm: Wandrers (Geheimnis). Köln: Edition Hundertmark 1985. without ISBN
- Gerhard Rühm: Die Wiener Gruppe. Achleitner, Artmann, Bayer, Rühm, Wiener. published by Gerhard Rühm. Reinbek bei Hamburg: Rowohlt 1985. ISBN 3-498-07300-1 (new edition)
- Gerhard Rühm: Leselieder/visuelle musik. Bielefeld and Graz: Communal Gallery and Culture House 1986. without ISBN
- Gerhard Rühm: Zeichnungen. Salzburg and Vienna: Residency 1987. ISBN 3-7017-0482-1
- Gerhard Rühm: botschaft an die zukunft. Collected spoken word. (with 1 MC in slipcase) Reinbek bei Hamburg: Rowohlt 1988. ISBN 3-498-05718-9
- Gerhard Rühm: reisefieber. Reinbek bei Hamburg: Rowohlt 1989. ISBN 3-498-05723-5
- Gerhard Rühm: Albertus Magnus Angelus. Salzburg and Vienna: Residenz 1989. ISBN 3-7017-0599-2
- Gerhard Rühm: Schrifttuschen. Frankfurt am Main: Kunstverein 1989. without ISBN
- Gerhard Rühm: Geschlechterdings. Chansons, Romances and Poems. Reinbek bei Hamburg: Rowohlt 1990. ISBN 3-498-05729-4
- Gerhard Rühm: theatertexte. Frankfurt am Main: Collection of the Author 1990. ISBN 3-88661-113-2
- Gerhard Rühm: zeichnungen und scherenschnitte. Mürzzuschlag: Walter-Buchebner-Gesellschaft 1990. without ISBN
- Gerhard Rühm: Die Kunst der Fingerfertigkeit. Hommage to Carl Czerny. Zell am See: Galerie Zell am See 1991. without ISBN
- Gerhard Rühm: Die Winterreise dahinterweise. New Poems and photomontgages. Zu Franz Schuberts Liederzyklus. Klagenfurt: Ritter 1991. ISBN 3-85415-087-3
- Gerhard Rühm: liederbilder. Bremen: Galerie am Steinernen Kreuz 1992. without ISBN
- Gerhard Rühm: überkreuzt. (with Heinz-Günter Prager). Köln: Wienand 1993. ISBN 3-87909-333-4
- Gerhard Rühm: Sämtliche Wiener Dialektdichtungen. (with 1 CD in slipcase) Graz und Wien: Droschl, 1993, ISBN 3-85420-344-6 (= Edition Neue Texte)
- Gerhard Rühm: textall. a utopian novel. Reinbek bei Hamburg: Rowohlt 1993. ISBN 3-498-05736-7
- Gerhard Rühm: Musik des Verstummens. A cycle for 12 collages. Meinigen: Galerie Ada 1994. without ISBN
- Gerhard Rühm: Bravo Haymon 1994. ISBN 3-85218-176-3
- Gerhard Rühm: auf messers schneide. Innsbruck: Haymon 1995. ISBN 3-85218-198-4
- Gerhard Rühm: zeichen-buch. Hamburg: Kunsthalle 1995. without ISBN
- Gerhard Rühm: 3 fragen, 2 sätze, bitten. Hamburg: Material 1995. ISBN 3-9802934-7-5
- Gerhard Rühm: knochenspielzeug. Düsseldorf: Eremiten 1995. (Neuausgabe) ISBN 3-87365-298-6
- Gerhard Rühm: drei kinematographische texte. Vienna: Edition Freibord 1996. ISBN 3-900483-42-6
- Gerhard Rühm: Visuelle Poesie. Innsbruck: Haymon 1996. ISBN 3-85218-223-9
- Gerhard Rühm: Coole Serie in memoriam. Salzburg: Edition Fotohof 1996. ISBN 3-901756-02-7
- Gerhard Rühm: Konrad Bayer – Sämtliche Werke. published by Gerhard Rühm. (Edited new edition) Stuttgart: Klett-Cotta 1996. ISBN 3-608-93382-4
- Gerhard Rühm: lesebilder – bildgedichte. Gumpoldskirchen: DEA 1997. without ISBN
- Gerhard Rühm: Wo die Landschaft beginnt (gefährlich zu werden). Bremen: Galerie am Steinernen Kreuz 1998. without ISBN
- Gerhard Rühm: Organische und geometrische Formen. Salzburg: Galerie im Traklhaus 1999. ISBN 3-901369-12-0
- Gerhard Rühm: Um zwölf Uhr ist es Sommer. Poems, spoken work, Chansons, plays, prose. Stuttgart: Reclam 2000. ISBN 3-15-018055-4
- Gerhard Rühm: ICH. I love you, Ich-images and Ich-objects. Weitra: Bibliothek der Provinz 2000. ISBN 3-85252-392-3
- Gerhard Rühm: Besteckstück. for table theater. Reinbek bei Hamburg: Rowohlt 2000. without ISBN
- Gerhard Rühm: Kunst-Stücke. Vienna, Libro 2000. ISBN 3-85494-103-X
- Gerhard Rühm: LICHT. Visual Poetics Visual Music. Graz: Steierischer Herbst 2001. without ISBN
- Gerhard Rühm: momentgedichte und kurzgeschichten. Köln: Edition Fundamental 2001. without ISBN
- Gerhard Rühm: schwellenchronik der jahrtausendwende. Graz: Droschl 2001. ISBN 3-85420-588-0
- Gerhard Rühm: masoch. Graz: Droschl 2003. ISBN 3-85420-636-4
- Gerhard Rühm: Das Welthände. Vienna: Edition Freibord 2003. ISBN 3-900483-53-1
- Gerhard Rühm: Was verschweigt die schwarze Witwe? Graz. Droschl 2004, ISBN 3-85420-655-0
- Gerhard Rühm: Die geregelte Wiedervereinigung Europas. Vienna: Freibord 2004. without ISBN
- Gerhard Rühm: Weit weg und ganz nah. Kassel: Kunsthalle Fridericianum 2006. ISBN 3-927015-48-2
- Gerhard Rühm: Kleine österreichische Volkskunde. Vienna: Edition Freibord 2008. without ISBN
- Gerhard Rühm: Schriftbilder. Köln: Museum Ludwig 2008 (Print Collection). without ISBN
- Gerhard Rühm: Aspekte einer erweiterten Poetik. Berlin: Matthes und Seitz 2008. ISBN 978-3-88221-736-0
- Gerhard Rühm: Von Graz nach Grinzing. Klagenfurt: Ritter 2010. ISBN 978-3-85415-461-7
- Gerhard Rühm: Sichtwechsel. Weitra: Bibliothek der Provinz 2010. ISBN 978-3-900000-64-6
- Gerhard Rühm: Lügen über Länder und Leute. Klagenfurt: Ritter 2011, ISBN 978-3-85415-476-1
- Gerhard Rühm: Rosenkränze und Kettengedichte. Hannover: Officin Albis 2011. ISBN 978-3-926152-15-2
- Gerhard Rühm: hero liest grillparzer / leander lernt schwimmen. eine klassische liebesgeschichte // kuchen und prothesen. zwei dutzend kurzprosatexte. Klagenfurt: Ritter 2019, ISBN 978-3-85415-596-6.
- Gerhard Rühm: Epigramme und Epitaphe. Klagenfurt: Ritter 2021, ISBN 978-3-85415-627-7.
- Gerhard Rühm: der mann mit eigenschaften. ein litaneiroman. Wien: Edition Melos 2022, ISBN 978-3-9505056-4-1.
