= Paul Jaeg =

Austrian artist and writer

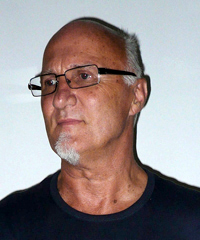
- Paul Jaeg (2011)
- Born: 1949 (age 76–77); Gosau, Austria
- Occupations: Writer, artist, compositor
- Writing career
- Period: Contemporary

Paul Jaeg (born Paul Gamsjäger 1949 in Gosau, Austria) is an Austrian artist and writer.

== Biography ==
Paul Jaeg is a compositor, artist and writer in the German language. Between 1991 and 2005 he had 51 exhibitions of his artistic works in Austria and Bavaria (26 personal exhibitions, 25 in collaboration with other artists), e.g., in the City Museum of Bad Ischl, in the Egon Schiele Art Centrum, in Český Krumlov, the Künstlerhaus in Salzburg, and the Johannes Kepler University of Linz. In 1999 he received a subsidy for literature from the province of Upper Austria.

Jaeg is the editor of the cultural magazine arovell-kulturzeitschrift and the proprietor and publisher of the publishing house Arovell Verlag. As an artist, he developed the so-called "aloquart" conception. Jaeg is a member of the Austrian writers' association Grazer Autorenversammlung, and since 2009 curator of the House of Arts Deutschvilla in Strobl am Wolfgangsee. Also since 2009 he is a member of the artists' group Sinnenbrand.

== Works ==
- Andere und andere, poetry, Salzburg 1995
- Trotz A bis Z, short novel, Salzburg 1995
- Wandere und wandere, poetry, Gosau 1996
- Rare Beime und Reime, poetry, Gosau 1997
- Ausdruck geben, stories, Gosau 1998
- Nur Lust ist nicht zu fassen, short novel, Salzburg 1998
- Schandsand im Gewand, stories, Gosau 1998
- Die schwarze Scheide, short novel, Gosau 1998
- Der Landwiener Thomas Bernhard, Scheuring 2000
- Tetralogie (4 Reiseromane), novels, Scheuring 2000
- Verknüpft gefragt, poetry and prose, Gosau 2001
- Alles noch unerlebt, prose, Gosau 2003
- Es zieht in Österreich, prose, Gosau 2005
- Dachstein und Gosautal, essay, Gosau 2008
- Hochmotiviert & niederträchig, poetry, Gosau 2008
- Werke – Worte, paintings, Gosau 2009
- Gosingerisch, dictionary of the dialect of the country around Gosau, Gosau 2009
- abtasten oder zuwarten, Lyrik, Gosau 2011
