= Wiener Werkstattpreis =

The international Wiener Werkstattpreis is a literary award established in 1992 in Austria. Since 2000, the award has been given annually. The organizers hope to bring public attention to writers who are not well known.

The grand prize is €1,100, with a second prize of €800 awarded by the audience. In 2007, authors could compete in three categories: short story, poetry and essay. Supported and partly financed by the Austrian government and the city administration of Vienna, the award is organized by the publisher FZA.

== Awardees ==
- 2010 Birgit van der Leeden
- 2009 Wolfgang Ellmauer and Markus Thiele
- 2008 Axel Görlach
- 2007 Klaus Ebner (main price and winner in the categories short story and essay)
  Winner in the category poetry: Norbert Sternmut
- 2006 Constantin Göttfert
- 2005 Felician Siebrecht
- 2004 Ingeborg Woitsch and Daniel Mylow
- 2003 Uljana Wolf
- 2002 Susanne Wagner
- 2001 Olaf Kurtz
- 2000 Christine Thiemt
- 1994 Franzobel
