= Dorothea Macheiner =

Austrian writer (born 1943)

- Born: 21 March 1943; Linz, Austria
- Occupation: Writer
- Writing career
- Period: Contemporary

Dorothea Macheiner (b. 21 March 1943 as Dorothea Hummelbrunner in Linz) is an Austrian writer.

== Life ==
Dorothea Macheiner grew up in Steinbach am Attersee. She studied theology and German philology. Several travels led her to the Mediterranean, Sardinia and Tunisia. In 1979, she participated at the literature award Ingeborg-Bachmann-Wettbewerb in Klagenfurt. She lives in Salzburg and Vienna.

Dorothea Macheiner writes novels, essays, poetry, drama and radio plays.

She is member of the writers' associations Grazer Autorenversammlung and IG Autorinnen Autoren. She received several subsidies for literature from the Austrian government and the city of Salzburg.

== Works ==
- Splitter, Baden bei Wien 1981
- Puppenspiele, Frankfurt am Main u. a. 1982
- Das Jahr der weisen Affen, Vienna 1988
- Sonnenskarabäus, Vienna 1993
- Nixenfall, Vienna 1996
- Yvonne, Vienna 2001
- Ravenna, Rom, Damaskus ..., Vienna 2004
- Stimmen, Gosau 2006
