= Wiener Gruppe =

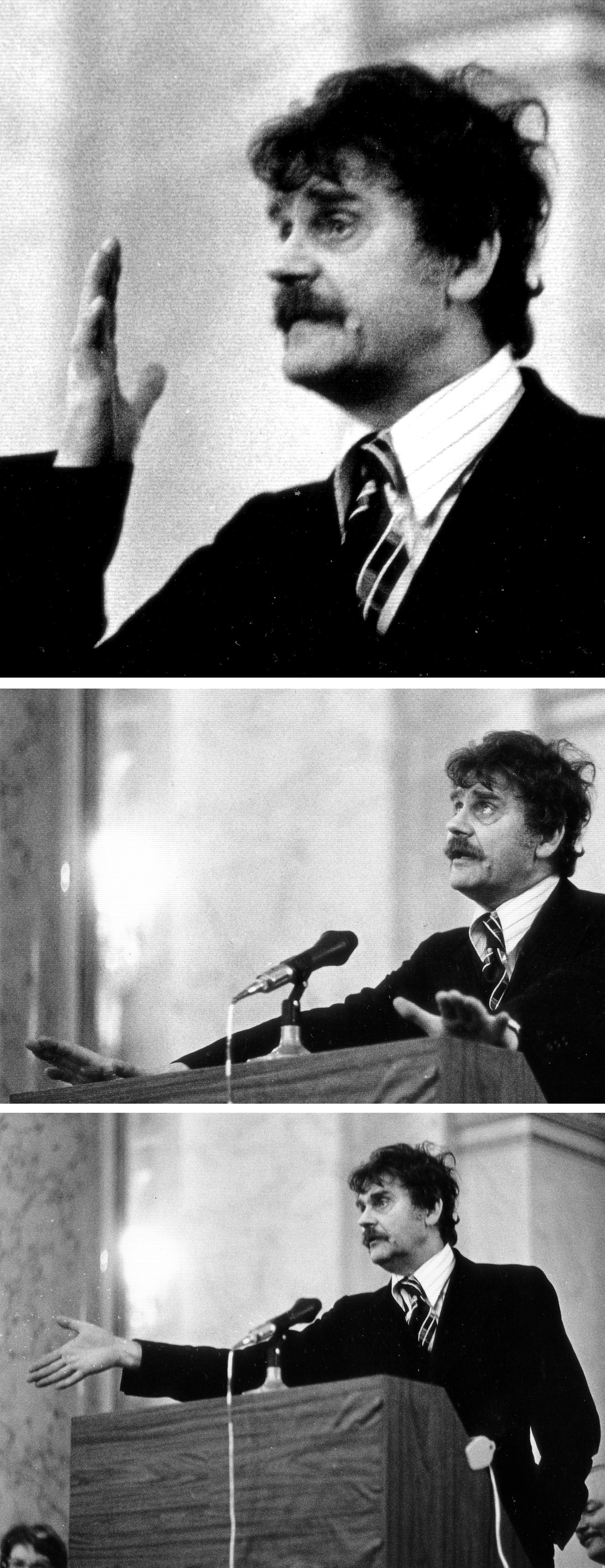
H. C. Artmann

The Wiener Gruppe (Vienna Group) was a small and loose avant-garde constellation of Austrian poets and writers, which arose from an older and wider postwar association of artists called Art-Club. The group was formed around 1953 under the influence of H. C. Artmann (1921–2000) in Vienna and existed for about a decade. Besides Artmann are Friedrich Achleitner (1930–2019), Konrad Bayer (1932–1964), Gerhard Rühm (b. 1930), Ingrid Wiener and Oswald Wiener (b. 1935) regarded as members.

This group showed interest in Baroque literature, as well as in Expressionism, Dadaism and Surrealism. Important impulses also came from upholders of linguistic scepticism, linguistic criticism and philosophy of language, such as Hugo von Hofmannsthal, Fritz Mauthner or Ludwig Wittgenstein.

The linguistic awareness of the Wiener Gruppe was also displayed in the members' notion of language as optic and acoustic material. Already in the early 1950s concrete poetry became an exciting new element of at least the works of Rühm, Achleitner and Wiener. Readings and recordings became important parts of the activity. With the charm of novelty, several members also made use of the richness of sounds and vocabulary of their own Bavarian and Vienna dialect. Furthermore, the group was trying out text montage.

== Literature ==
- Gerhard Rühm (ed.): Die Wiener Gruppe: Achleitner, Artmann, Bayer, Rühm, Wiener (Rowohlt, Reinbek 1985) ISBN 978-3-498-07300-8.
- Peter Weibel (ed.): die wiener gruppe. a moment of modernity 1954-1960 / the visual works and actions. (Springer, Wien & New York 1997) - Exhib. cat. Biennale di Venezia
- F. Achleitner and P. Weibel (ed.): Wiener Gruppe (1997)
- F. Achleitner and W. Fetz (ed.): Wiener Gruppe. (Exhib. cat., Kunsthalle Wien, 1998)
- Michael Backes: Experimentelle Semiotik in Literaturavantgarden. Über die Wiener Gruppe mit Bezug auf die Konkrete Poesie (Wilhelm Fink Verlag, München 2001) ISBN 3-7705-3450-6.
- Thomas Eder, Juliane Vogel: „verschiedene sätze treten auf“. Die Wiener Gruppe in Aktion Profile. Magazin des Österreichischen Literaturarchivs der Österreichischen Nationalbibliothek, Bd. 15.(Wien 2008) ISBN 978-3-552-05444-8
- Klaus Kastberger: Vienna 1950/60. An Austrian Avant-Garde (2009). Online academia.edu
