= Heinz Gerstinger =

Austrian writer, playwright and historian (1919–2016)

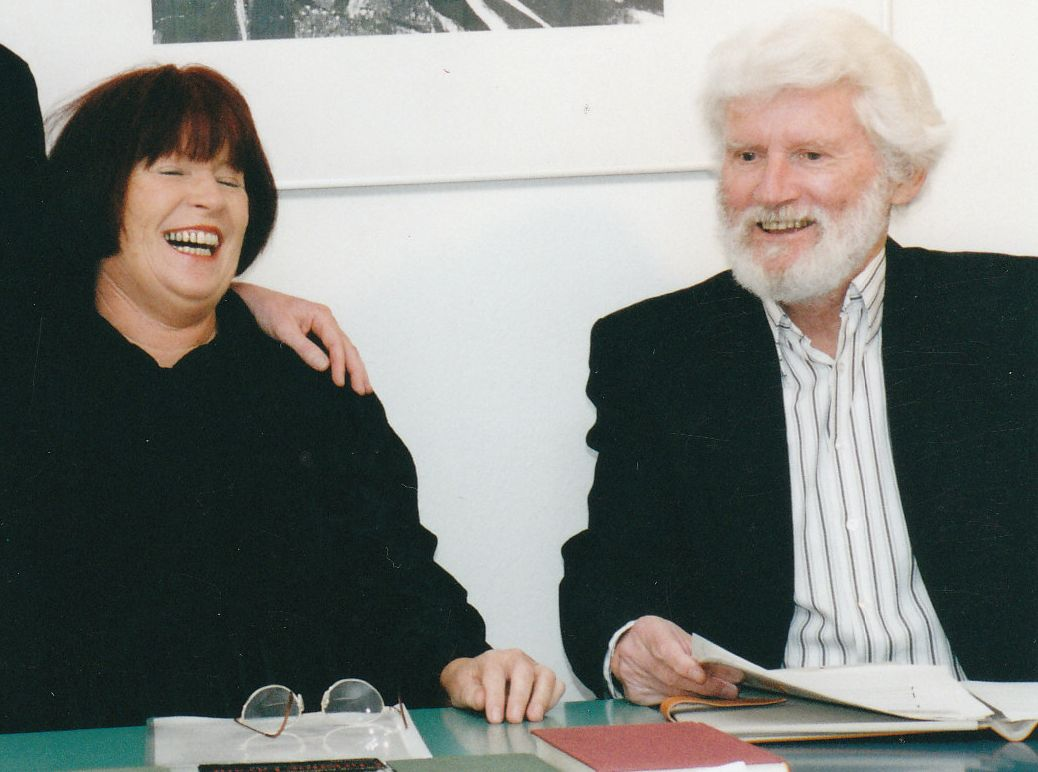
Heinz Gerstinger and his wife Erika Santner

Heinz Gerstinger (born October 13, 1919 in Vienna; died April 28, 2016) was an Austrian writer, playwright and historian.

== Biography ==
Heinz Gerstinger studied history and dramatics at the University of Vienna. He has worked for the universities of Graz and Vienna as well as for theaters in Graz, Augsburg and Vienna. While publishing in literary magazines and newspapers, he worked for the Austrian radio and television. Heinz Gerstinger was a member of the Austrian P.E.N. and the writers' association Österreichischer Schriftstellerverband.

== Works ==
=== Movie ===
- As an actor: Bernhard Wicki (director): Das falsche Gewicht following the book by Joseph Roth

=== Literature ===
- Calderón, Velber Hannover, Friedrich 1967
- Spanische Komödie – Lope de Vega und seine Zeitgenossen, Friedrich Velber Verlag, Hannover 1968
- Theater und Religion heute, 1972
- Der Dramatiker Anton Wildgans, 1981
- Österreich, holdes Märchen und böser Traum – August Strindbergs Ehe mit Frida Uhl, Herold, Vienna 1981
- Der Dramatiker Hans Krendlesberger, Wagner, Innsbruck 1981
- Wien von gestern – ein literarischer Streifzug durch die Kaiserstadt, Edition Wien, Vienna 1991, ISBN 3-85058-073-3
- Frau Venus reitet... – Die phantastische Geschichte des Ulrich von Lichtenstein, 1995
- Ausflugsziel Burgen – 30 Burgen rund um Wien, Pichler, Vienna 1998, ISBN 3-85431-158-3
- Altwiener literarische Salons – Wiener Salonkultur vom Rokoko bis zur Neoromantik (1777–1907), Akademische Verlagsanstalt Salzburg 2002, ISBN 3-9501445-1-X
- Der heilige Dämon – Gregor VII, Faksimile Verlag, Graz/Salzburg, ISBN 3-9502040-0-8
