= Karl-Markus Gauß =

Austrian contemporary writer, essayist and editor

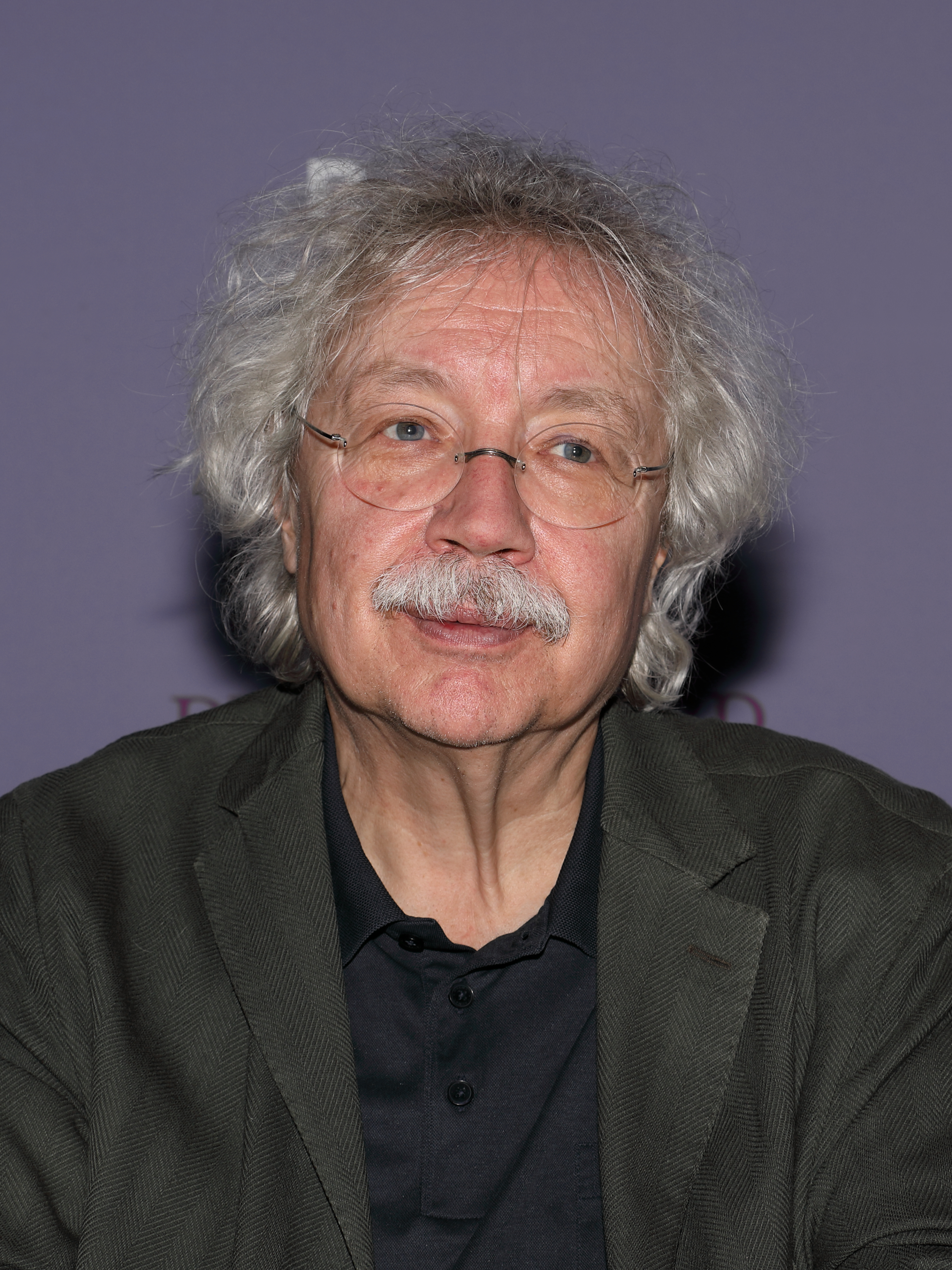
Karl-Markus Gauß, 2013

Karl-Markus Gauß (born 14 May 1954, in Salzburg) is an Austrian contemporary writer, essayist and editor. He lives in Salzburg.

== Biography ==
Gauß has a degree for German Philology and History from the University of Salzburg. He very early published literary essays, primarily in the magazine Wiener Tagebuch (Viennese Diary). Since 1991, Gauß is editor in chief of the literary magazine Literatur und Kritik, published by the Salzburg publishing house Otto Müller Verlag. In addition, he writes articles and essays for Austrian, German and Swiss newspapers and magazines, such as Die Zeit, Frankfurter Allgemeine Zeitung, Neue Zürcher Zeitung, Salzburger Nachrichten, and Die Presse. In 2006, Karl-Markus Gauß was accepted as member of the German Academy of Language and Poetry.

== Works ==
Primarily, Karl-Markus Gauß writes essays. One of his main topics are ethnic minorities, some of which aren't sometimes known to the readers even by their name, such as the Aromanians, Roma, Arbëreshë and the Sephardim. Other important topics are Central and South Eastern Europe. Gauß visited these countries on several occasions, usually jointly with the photographer Kurt Kaindl.

His cultural reports and essays describe cultural encounters and intellectual exchanges with the writers of those countries, but also with people "like me and you", on the streets and in pubs. Gauß uses his books very often to present and promote writers from Central and Eastern Europe, who are relatively unknown in Austria and Germany.

== Literary prizes and awards ==
- 1987 International Prize of Portorož for Essays
- 1988 State Subsidy for Literature by the Austrian Department of Education and Cultural Affairs
- 1989 Buchprämie des Bundesministeriums für Unterricht und Kunst
- 1992 Subsidy for Literature by the City of Salzburg
- 1994 Buchprämie des Bundesministeriums für Unterricht und Kunst
- 1994 Österreichischer Staatspreis für Kulturpublizistik
- 1997 European Essay Prize Charles Veillon for Das Europäische Alphabet
- 1998 Bruno-Kreisky-Preis for the Political Book for Ins unentdeckte Österreich
- 2001 Award of the Austrian Book Sellers for Tolerant Thinking and Acting
- 2004 René-Marcic-Preis
- 2005 Manès-Sperber-Preis Vienna
- 2005 Vilenica International Literary Prize
- 2006 Georg Dehio Book Prize
- 2007 Honorary doctorate in philosophy from Salzburg University
- 2007 Mitteleuropa-Preis
- 2010 Johann-Heinrich-Merck-Preis
- 2018 Jean Améry Prize for European essay-writing
- 2019 Cross of Honour for Science and Art, First Class, Austrian Decoration for Science and Art
- 2022 Leipzig Book Award for European Understanding

== Bibliography ==
- Im Wald der Metropolen, Zsolnay Verlag 2010, Vienna ISBN 978-3-552-05505-6
- Zu früh, zu spät, Zsolnay Verlag 2007, Vienna ISBN 3-552-05397-2
- Die versprengten Deutschen. Unterwegs in Litauen, durch die Zips und am Schwarzen Meer. Paul Zsolnay Verlag, Vienna 2005 ISBN 3-552-05354-9
- Wirtshausgespräche in der Erweiterungszone. Otto Müller Verlag, Salzburg 2005 ISBN 3-7013-1102-1
- Die Hundeesser von Svinia. Paul Zsolnay Verlag, Vienna 2004 ISBN 3-552-05292-5
- Von nah, von fern. Ein Jahresbuch. Paul Zsolnay Verlag, Vienna 2003 ISBN 3-552-05286-0
- Mit mir, ohne mich. Ein Journal. Paul Zsolnay Verlag, Vienna 2002 ISBN 3-552-05181-3
- Die sterbenden Europäer. Unterwegs zu den Sepharden von Sarajevo, Gottscheer Deutschen, Arbëreshe, Sorben und Aromunen. Paul Zsolnay Verlag, Vienna 2001 ISBN 3-552-05158-9
- Der Mann, der ins Gefrierfach wollte. Albumblätter. Paul Zsolnay Verlag, Vienna 1999 ISBN 3-552-04936-3
- Ins unentdeckte Österreich. Nachrufe und Attacken. Paul Zsolnay Verlag, Vienna 1998 ISBN 3-552-04878-2
- Das europäische Alphabet. Paul Zsolnay Verlag, Vienna 1997 ISBN 3-552-04827-8
- Ritter, Tod und Teufel. Essay. Wieser Verlag, Klagenfurt 1994 ISBN 3-85129-149-2
- Die Vernichtung Mitteleuropas. Essays. Wieser Verlag, Klagenfurt 1991 ISBN 3-85129-043-7
- Der wohlwollende Despot. Über die Staatsschattengewächse – Essay. Wieser Verlag, Klagenfurt 1989 ISBN 3-85129-018-6
- Tinte ist bitter. Literarische Porträts aus Barbaropa – Essays. Wieser Verlag, Klagenfurt 1988 ISBN 3-85129-003-8
- Wann endet die Nacht. Über Albert Ehrenstein – ein Essay. Edition Moderne, Zurich 1986 ISBN 3-907010-24-8

== See also ==
- List of Austrian writers
