= Ferry Radax =

Austrian film maker (1932–2021)

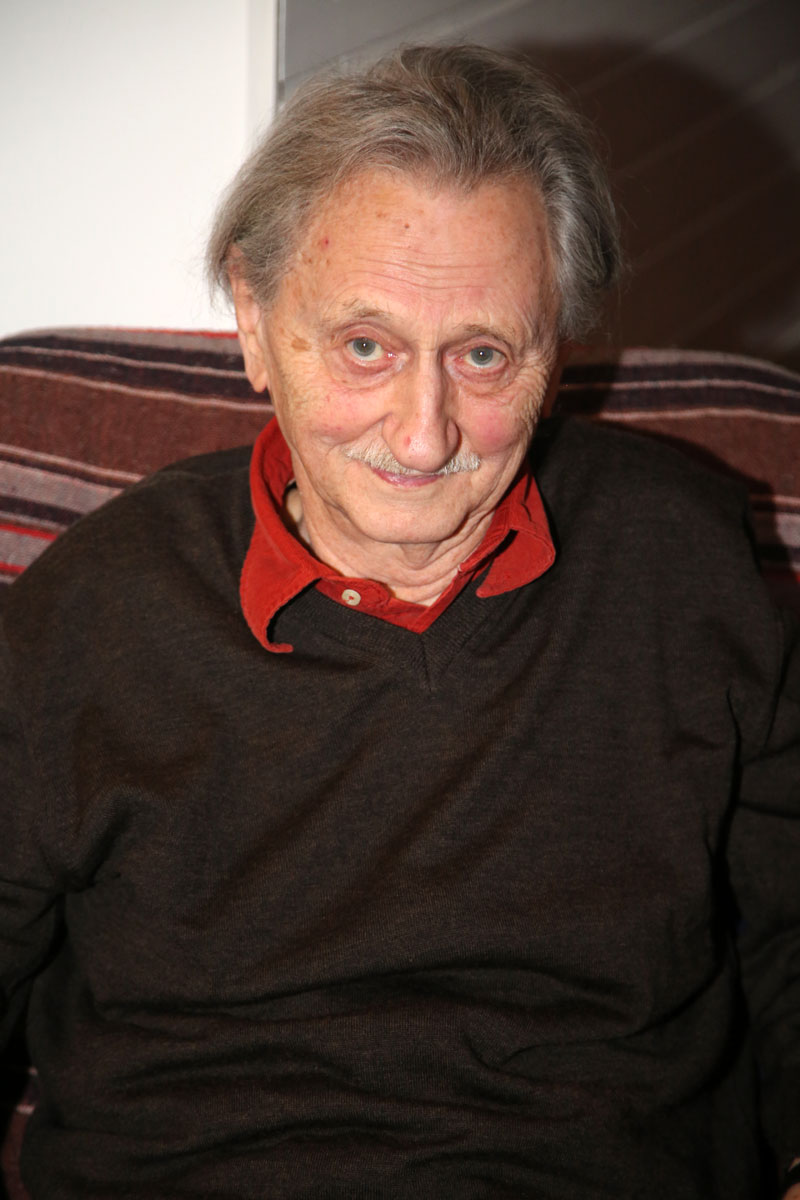
Radax in 2014

Ferry Radax (20 June 1932 – 9 September 2021) was an Austrian filmmaker born in Vienna, Austria.

== Career ==
Radax was active in many genres since 1949. He studied at Vienna's Film Institute in 1953–54, followed by Cinecittà, Centro Sperimentale di Cinematografia, in Rome in 1955–56. He produced films all around Europe, and also in South America, the United States, and New Zealand. He made feature films, but was mostly known for short experimental films, documentaries and portraits of poets and artists. Some of them, Konrad Bayer, Friedensreich Hundertwasser, and H. C. Artmann, he became acquainted with in the early 1950s as a member of Art-Club in Vienna.

Finally, 40 different films from 40 years of filmmaking and the total oeuvre of 120 productions were also shown for a month at Vienna's Albertina Film Museum in 1993. The film festival Diagonale dedicated a personale to Radax in 2012.

== Selected films ==
- Sonne halt! (Sun stop!, 1960) With Konrad Bayer. The film which Ferry Radax is most known for in his native country. An experimental film produced in Italy and Switzerland. 26 min., black and white. It was shown as the first film at Künstlerhaus (Artist's House) in Vienna in spring 2008, as Ferry Radax was celebrated and many of his films were shown for one and a half months. The film is on DVD since 2007.
- Hundertwasser – Leben in Spiralen (Hundertwasser – life in spirals, 1966). Ferry Radax praised first documentary on his fellow-countryman, the artist Friedensreich Hundertwasser, and his life in Europe.
- H.C. Artmann (1967). A portrait of a legendary Austrian poet. 42 min., black and white.
- Konrad Bayer, oder: die welt bin ich und das ist meine sache (Konrad Bayer, or: the world am I and that's my business, 1969). An experimental portrait of Konrad Bayer and his suicide. 52 min., black and white. A mixture of documentary and fiction.
- Der Kopf des Vitus Bering (Vitus Bering's head, 1970). 26 min., black and white. An experimental mixture of documentary and fiction after a book by Konrad Bayer.
- Thomas Bernhard – Drei Tage (Thomas Bernhard – three days, 1970). Based on a written self-portrait by the Austrian writer Thomas Bernhard.
- Schizophrene Maler (Schizophrenic painters, 1971).
- Der Italiener (The Italian, 1972), a feature film based on a script by Thomas Bernhard.
- Ludwig Wittgenstein (1976). 2x60 min. documentary/fiction.
- Attentat in Bad Gastein (Attack in Bad Gastein, 1979), a feature film on political terrorism.
- Mit Erich von Däniken in Peru (With Erich von Däniken in Peru, 1982). A documentary.
- Capri – Musik die sich entfernt, oder: Die seltsame Reise des Cyrill K. (Capri – music fading away, or: The strange journey of Cyrill K., 1983), a made-for-TV movie for the WDR, featuring Jacques d'Adelswärd-Fersen, and a lot of other historical Capri celebrities. The director himself appears as Friedrich Nietzsche.
- Hundertwasser in Neuseeland (Hundertwasser in New Zealand, 1998). After 30 years Ferry Radax made a second portrait of the artist Friedensreich Hundertwasser.
