= Hans Dieter Aigner =

Austrian artist and writer

- Born: 1958 (age 67–68); Linz
- Occupations: Writer, artist
- Writing career
- Period: Contemporary

Hans Dieter Aigner (born 1958 in Linz) is an Austrian artist and writer.

== Biography ==
Hans Dieter Aigner studied at the Academy of Pedagogy. Since 1985, he is working as an artist and participates at exhibitions. In 1991 he started writing. In 1993, he was awarded the literature prize Linzer-City-Ring in Austria. In the same year and in 2000 he received a subsidy for literature from the province of Upper Austria, and in 2002 he received a subsidy for residence in Český Krumlov in the Czech Republic. Aigner writes narrative fiction and poetry.

== Works ==
- Gegenüber, Arovell Verlag, Gosau 2004
- Sekuloff reist, Edition Pro Mente, Linz 2002
- ... von einem, der auszog ..., stories, Edition Pro Mente, Linz 1999
