= Wolfgang Ratz =

Austrian writer and singer-songwriter (born 1959)

Wolfgang Ratz (born January 12, 1959, in Bilbao, Spain) is an Austrian writer and singer-songwriter.

== Biography ==
Wolfgang Ratz was born in Bilbao in the Basque Country. During his youth he lived in Vienna, Austria. He studied translation for Spanish, English and French, as well as Graphical Arts at the University of Vienna. Ratz works as a writer, translator of literature, artist and singer-songwriter in Vienna. He writes poetry, narrative prose and critical reviews. He contributed in German and Spanish to literary magazines (e.g. Literarisches Österreich, Die Furche, Literaricum, O Correo Galego, Diario de Querétaro) and published in anthologies. In 1991 he was awarded the 3rd Poetry Prize of the PEN Club of Liechtenstein, in 1996 the mención de honor at the Festival of Literature of the Latin American magazin Xicóatl, and in 2006 the 2nd Prize of the International Poetry Competition – German of Dublin's Feile Filíochta.

Wolfgang Ratz is a member of the writers' association Grazer Autorenversammlung, founding member of ALA (Latin American Authors in Austria) and a former board member of the Austrian Writers' Association Österreichischer Schriftstellerverband.

== Publications ==
- Hoja roja/Zerrissenes Blatt, poetry Spanish and German (with Javier Tafur), Cuadernos negros, Calarcá 2007
- El idioma de las hormigas/Die Sprache der Ameisen, poetry Spanish and German, Vitrales de Alejandría, Caracas 2004, ISBN 980-6480-23-6
- Poesía entre dos mundos: antología ALA, poetry (Ed.), Edition Doppelpunkt, Vienna 2004, ISBN 3-85273-177-1
- Zimt und Metall, poetry, Verlag G. Grasl, Baden bei Wien 2002, ISBN 3-85098-259-9
- 1492-keine Wahrheit ist auch eine Klarheit, drama (Theater group CCC put the drama on stage in Spanish), Vienna 1992
