= H. C. Artmann =

Austrian poet and writer

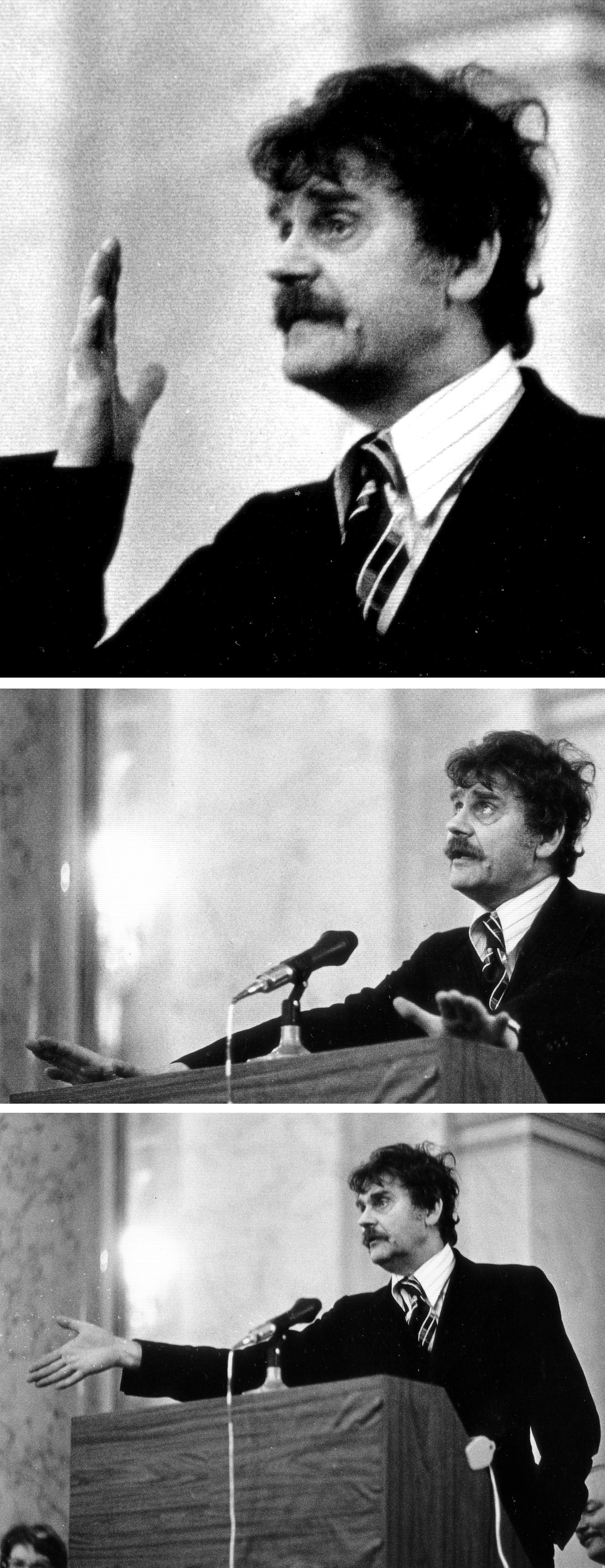
Acceptance speech for Grand Austrian State Prize, 1974, Vienna, Hofburg

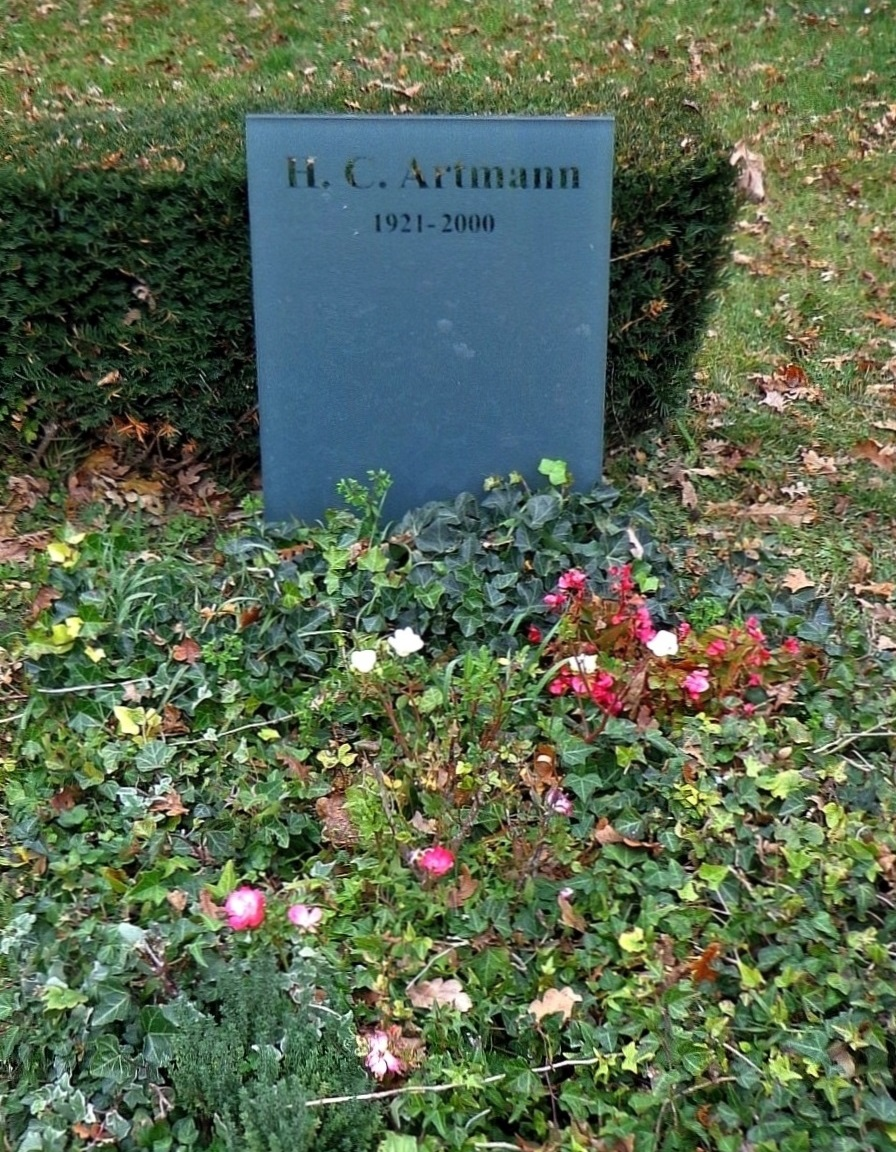
Grave of H.C. Artmann

Hans Carl Artmann (12 June 1921 – 4 December 2000), also known as Ib Hansen, was an Austrian poet and writer, most popular for his early poems written in Viennese (med ana schwoazzn dintn, 1958), which however, never after were to be the focus of his oeuvre.

== Life and work ==
Artmann was born in Vienna as the son of shoe maker Johann Artmann and his wife Marie (née Schneider). After growing up in Vienna and attending Volks- & Hauptschule, he worked as an office intern for three years; in 1940, he was conscripted during World War II, and transferred to a punishment battalion after suffering a war wound in 1941.

Having grown up trilingually, Artmann had an interest in language from an early age on; in 1947, his first publications appeared on radio and in the newspaper Neue Wege. He joined the Art-Club in 1951, and worked with Gerhard Rühm and Konrad Bayer from 1952 on. The same year, he also founded the so-called Wiener Gruppe of avantgarde poets, which he left in 1958.

Starting in 1954, Artmann travelled Europe extensively; he stayed in Sweden from 1961 to 1965, living in Stockholm, Lund and Malmö, then went to live in Berlin until 1969, to settle down in Salzburg in 1972. As Ib Hansen he had sung at DMGP 1966 with the song "Lille Veninde" placing equal 3rd with 9 points.

He was a founding member of the Anti P.E.N. club in 1973; later that year, he became and stayed president of the Grazer Autorenversammlung until leaving the organization in 1978.

He earned several awards for his achievements in literature during his lifetime, including the Grand Austrian State Prize in 1974, the title of honorary doctor from the University of Salzburg in 1991 and the Georg-Büchner Preis for literature in 1997.

Artmann wrote a number of humorous stories, including parodies of Dracula, (dracula dracula, 1966), Frankenstein, (Frankenstein in Sussex, 1969) and Hollywood fantasy films ("In the Gulf of Carpentaria").

Artmann was a prolific translator; he rendered Edward Lear, Lars Gustafsson, Daisy Ashford and H.P. Lovecraft into German.

He also translated one volume of the Asterix series into Viennese language, Da Legionäa Asterix, which was released in 1999.

H. C. Artmann died from a heart attack on 4 December 2000 in Vienna at the age 79. He was cremated at Feuerhalle Simmering, where his ashes are also buried.

== Selected works ==
- Achtundachtzig: Ausgewählte Gedichte (1996) ISBN 3-7017-1009-0
- Der aeronautische Sindtbart: oder, Seltsame Luftreise von Niedercalifornien nach Crain (1975) ISBN 3-423-01067-3
- Allerleirausch: neue schöne Kinderreime (1978) ISBN 3-921499-22-4
- Angus; English version by Olive Jones (1974) ISBN 0-416-80470-5
- Artmann, H.C., Dichter: Ein Album mit alten Bildern und neuen Texten; edited by Jochen Jung (1986) ISBN 3-7017-0455-4
- Aus meiner Botanisiertrommel: Balladen u. Naturgedichte (1975) ISBN 3-7017-0134-2
- The Best of H.C. Artmann; edited by Klaus Reichert (1975) ISBN 3-518-36775-7
- Christopher und Peregrin und was weiter geschah: Ein Bären-Roman in drei Kapiteln; with Barbara Wehr (1975)
- Drakula, Drakula. Ein transsylvanisches Abenteuer; with Uwe Brenner (1966)
- Die Fahrt zur Insel Nantucket; Theater (1969)
- Fleiss und Industrie (1989) ISBN 3-518-01691-1
- Frankenstein in Sussex (1974) ISBN 3-88010-009-8
- Gedichte über die Liebe und über die Lasterhaftigkeit (1975) ISBN 3-518-01473-0
- Gedichte von der Wollust des Dichtens in Worte gefasst (1989) ISBN 3-7017-0568-2
- Gesammelte Prosa; edited by Klaus Reichert, 4 volumes (1997) ISBN 3-7017-1094-5
- Gesänge der Hämmer (1996) ISBN 3-7013-0931-0
- Goethe trifft Lilo Pulver und wandert mit ihr durch den Spessart zum Schloss Mespelbrunn (1996) ISBN 3-927480-35-5
- Grammatik der Rosen: gesammelte Prosa; edited by Klaus Reichert, 3 volumes (1979) ISBN 3-7017-0221-7
- Grünverschlossene Botschaft. 90 Träume (1967)
- H.C. Artmann: ich bin Abenteurer und nicht Dichter: Aus Gesprächen mit Kurt Hofmann (2001) ISBN 3-85002-465-2
- Hans-Christof Stenzel’s POEtarium (1991)
- Der Herr Norrrdwind: ein Opernlibretto (2005) ISBN 3-7017-1410-X
- How much, Schatzi? (1971)
- Ich brauch einen Wintermantel etz.: Briefe an Herbert Wochinz; edited by Alois Brandstetter (2005) ISBN 3-902144-92-0
- Im Schatten der Burenwurst: Skizzen aus Wien (1983) ISBN 3-7017-0329-9
- Die Jagd nach Dr. U.: oder, Ein einsamer Spiegel, in dem sich der Tag reflektiert (1977) ISBN 3-7017-0166-0
- Kleinere Taschenkunststücke. Fast eine Chinoiserie (1973) ISBN 3-88010-000-4
- Eine Lektion in Poesie wird vorbereitet (1998) ISBN 3-85420-490-6
- Ein lilienweisser Brief aus Lincolnshire: Gedichte aus 21 Jahren; edited by Gerald Bisinger (1969)
- Nachrichten aus Nord und Süd (1978) ISBN 3-7017-0196-2
- Ompül (1974) ISBN 3-7608-0338-5 OCLC 1802375
- Das Prahlen des Urwaldes im Dschungel (1983) ISBN 3-88537-057-3
- The quest for Dr. U, or, A solitary mirror in which the day reflects; translated by Malcolm Green & Derk Wynand (1993) ISBN 0-947757-56-2
- Der Schlüssel zum Paradies: religiöse Dichtung der Kelten (1993) ISBN 3-7013-0744-X
- Die Sonne war ein grünes Ei: von der Erschaffung der Welt und ihren Dingen (1982) ISBN 3-7017-0300-0
- Das Suchen nach dem gestrigen Tag; oder, Schnee auf einem heissen Brotwecken : Eintragungen e. bizarren Liebhabers (1978) ISBN 3-442-07013-9
- Unter der Bedeckung eines Hutes. Montagen u. Sequenzen (1974) ISBN 3-7017-0097-4
- Verbarium. Gedichte (1966)
- Von einem Husaren, der seine guldine Uhr in einem Teich oder Weiher verloren, sie aber nachhero nicht wiedergefunden hat (1990) ISBN 3-7013-0776-8
- Die Wanderer (1979) ISBN 3-921499-24-0
- Was sich im Fernen abspielt: gesammelte Geschichten edited by Hans Haider (1995) ISBN 3-7017-0899-1
- Wer dichten kann ist Dichtersmann: eine Auswahl aus dem Werk; edited by Christina Weiss and Karl Riha (1986) ISBN 3-15-008264-1
- Yeti; oder, John, ich reise ...; with Rainer Pichler and Hannes Schneider (1970)
- Der zerbrochene Krug: nach Heinrich von Kleist (1992) ISBN 3-7017-0784-7

== A documentary film ==
- Ferry Radax: H.C. Artmann (1967). A documentary film portrait of the legend made by a fellow countryman. 42 min., black and white.

== Decorations and awards ==
- 1974: Grand Austrian State Prize for Literature
- 1977: Literature Prize of the City of Vienna
- 1981: Ring of Honour of the City of Salzburg
- 1981: Rauriser citizens Prize for Literature
- 1981, 1989 and 1991: Literature Prize of the City of Salzburg
- 1983: Literature Prize of the Salzburg economy
- 1984: Golden Medal of Honour of Salzburg
- 1986: Austrian Cross of Honour for Science and Art, 1st class
- 1986: Manuscripts Award for the Forum Stadtpark of Styria
- 1986: translator premium of the Federal Ministry of Education and Arts
- 1986: Mainzer Stadtschreiber
- 1987: Art Prize visual artists from Austria and Germany for a highly esteemed and admired colleague
- 1989: Franz Nabl Prize
- 1991: Honorary cup of Salzburg
- 1991: Honorary doctorate from the University of Salzburg
- 1991: Literature Prize of the City of Salzburg
- 1991: Austrian Decoration for Science and Art
- 1992: Franz Grillparzer Prize Foundation F.V.S. Hamburg
- 1994: Peace current price for dialect poetry of Kreis Neuss
- 1996: Grand Decoration of Carinthia
- 1996: Honorary Ring of the Vienna
- 1997: Georg Büchner Prize
- 1997: Honorary Award of the Austrian book trade for tolerance in thought and action
- 1999: Literature of the Province of Styria
- 2000: Grand Gold Decoration for Services to the Republic of Austria

== See also ==
- List of Austrian writers
