= Peter Paul Wiplinger =

Austrian writer and photographer (born 1939)

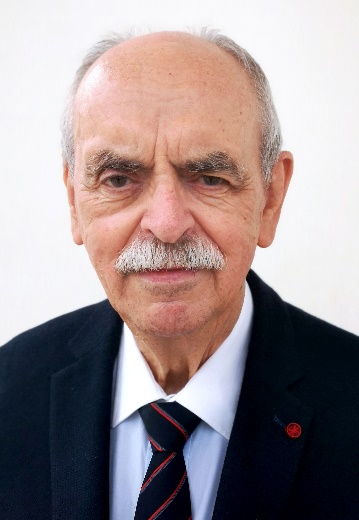
Peter Paul Wiplinger at the Literarischer Salon (Vienna 2003)

Peter Paul Wiplinger (born 25 June 1939 in Haslach an der Mühl) is an Austrian writer and photographer.

Wiplinger was born in 1939 in Haslach an der Mühl in Upper Austria as the tenth child of a merchant family. He studied performance arts, German and philosophy. Since 1960 he has lived as liberal writer and photographer in Vienna. He is member of the Austrian P.E.N., auf the Austrian League for Human Rights, of the Documentation Center of Austrian Resistance against Nazisms, and he is directing member of the writers' association IG Autorinnen Autoren. He has received several awards, including the Austrian Cross of Honour for Science and Art, 1st class in 2003 and the Cultural Medal of Upper Austria in 2005.

Wiplinger published about 30 books, which have been translated to more than 20 languages. He primarily writes political essays, poetry and artistic photography.

== Works (selection) ==
- Hoc est enim, poetry, Munich 1966
- Gitter, poetry, Baden bei Wien 1981
- Herzschläge, poetry, Baden bei Wien 1989
- Lebenszeichen, poetry, Klagenfurt 1992
- Ausgestoßen, prose, Gosau 1994/2004
- Niemandsland, poetry, Eisenstadt 2002
- Lebensbilder, memories, Grünbach 2003
- Steine im Licht, poetry, Gosau 2007
