= Schalchen =

- Municipality
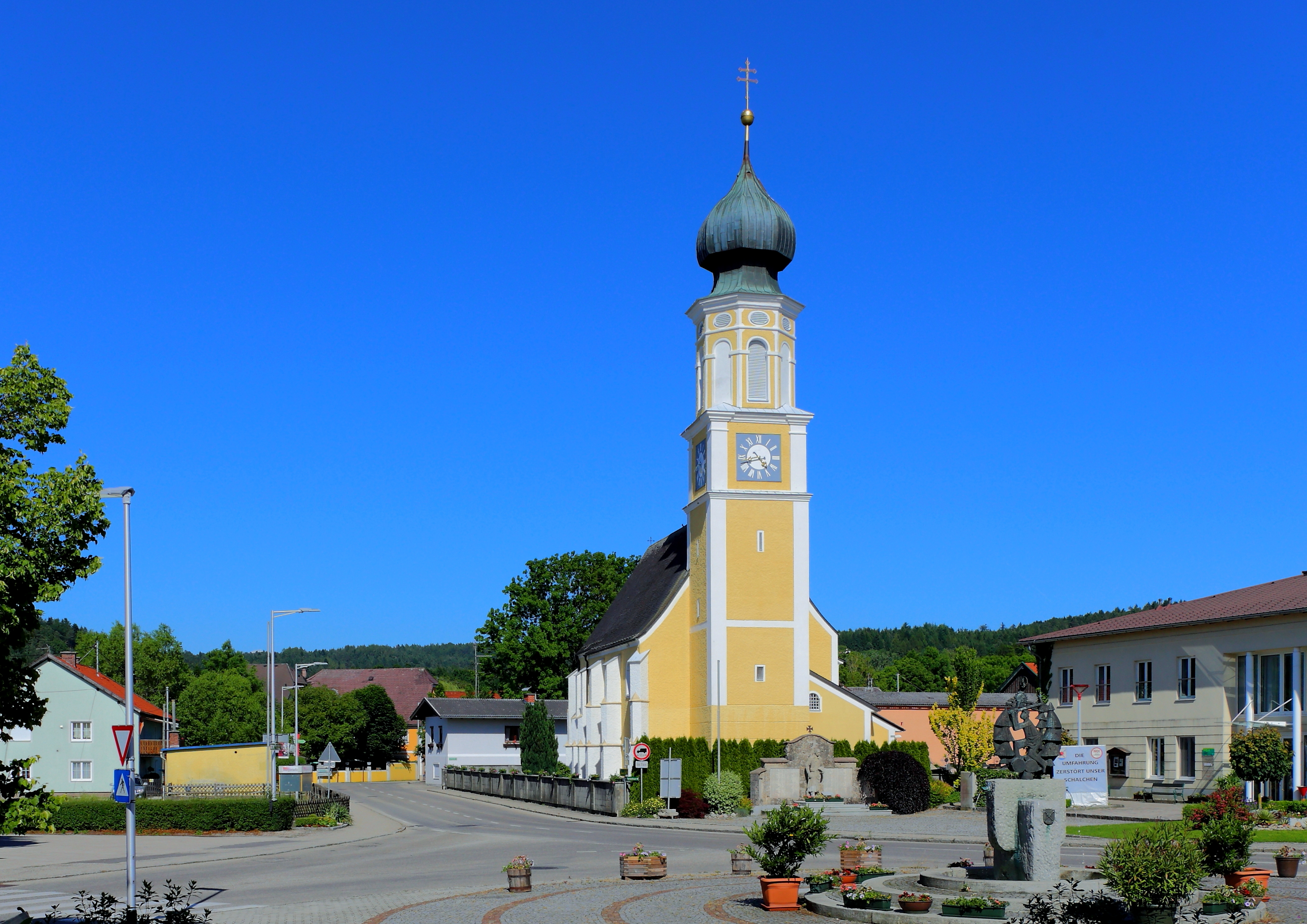
- Market square with the Church of Saint James the Elder

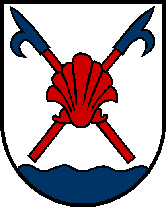
- Coat of arms

- Location within Austria
- Coordinates: 48°07′08″N 13°09′25″E
- Country: Austria
- State: Upper Austria
- District: Braunau am Inn

Government
  - Mayor: Andreas Stuhlberger (SPÖ)

Area
  - Total: 41.13 km^{2} (15.88 sq mi)
- Elevation: 438 m (1,437 ft)

Population (2018-01-01)
  - Total: 3,877
  - Density: 94.26/km^{2} (244.1/sq mi)
- Time zone: UTC+1 (CET)
  - Summer (DST): UTC+2 (CEST)
- Postal code: 5231
- Area code: 07742
- Vehicle registration: BR
- Website: www.schalchen.at

Schalchen is a municipality in the district of Braunau am Inn in the Austrian state of Upper Austria.

== Geography ==
Schalchen lies in the Innviertel. About 56 percent of the municipality is forest and 39 percent farmland.
