= Constantin Göttfert =

Austrian writer (born 1979)

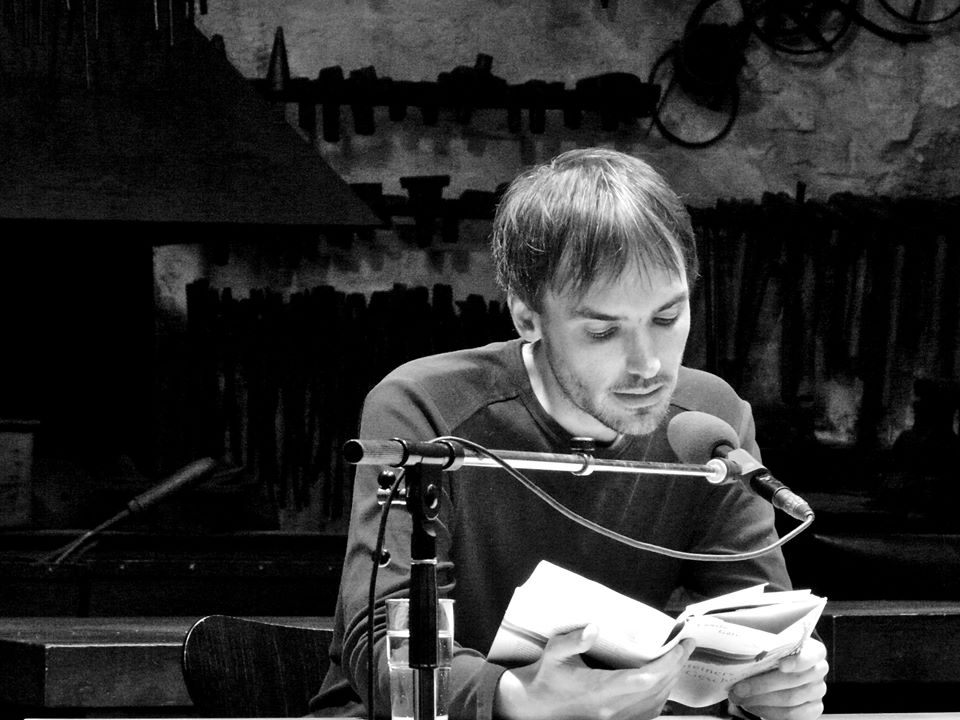
- Born: 1979 (age 46–47)
- Occupation: Writer
- Writing career
- Period: Contemporary

Constantin Göttfert (born 1979) is an Austrian writer.

== Biography ==
He studied German language and Cultural Sciences at the University of Vienna. Göttfert lives in Vienna and has received several literary prizes.

== Works ==
- Holzung, short stories, Arovell Verlag, Gosau 2006 ISBN 978-3-901435-81-2
- In dieser Wildnis, poetenladen-Verlag, Leipzig 2010 ISBN 978-3-940691-15-6
- Satus Katze, C.H.Beck, München 2011 ISBN 978-3-406-62164-2
- Steiners Geschichte, C.H.Beck, München 2014 ISBN 978-3406-66757-2

== See also ==
- List of Austrian writers
