= Oswald Wiener =

Austrian-Canadian writer, cyberneticist and member of the Vienna Group

- Born: 5 October 1935; Vienna, Austria
- Died: 18 November 2021 (aged 86); Styria, Austria
- Occupations: Writer, cyberneticist, language theorist, musician, restaurateur
- Notable work: die verbesserung von mitteleuropa, roman

Oswald Wiener (5 October 1935 – 18 November 2021) was an Austrian-Canadian writer, cyberneticist, language theorist, musician and restaurateur. He was one of the central figures of the avant‑garde Wiener Gruppe, known for his radical experiments with language, his interest in cybernetics, and his influential reflections on consciousness and artificial intelligence.

== Life ==
Wiener was born in Vienna in 1935. He studied law, musicology, African languages and mathematics at the University of Vienna, although he did not complete a degree. Alongside his studies he worked as a jazz musician, playing trumpet in several ensembles during the 1950s.

== Personal life ==
Wiener was married twice. First to the German-Austrian visual artist Lore Heuermann. One of their daughters is the chef, author and politician Sarah Wiener. Their marriage ended in 1964. Later he married the artist Ingrid Wiener.

== Awards ==
- 1989 – Grand Austrian State Prize for Literature

== Selected works ==
- die verbesserung von mitteleuropa, roman (1969)
- Nicht schon wieder...! (essays)
- Probleme der Künstlichen Intelligenz (essays)
