= Jeannie Ebner =

Austrian writer

Jeannie Ebner (1918–2004) was an Austrian author born in Sydney, New South Wales 17 November, 1918. She died in Vienna, Austria 16 March 2004.

== Works ==
Some of her works are:

- Sie warten auf Antwort (1954)
- Die Wildnis früher Sommer (1958)
- Der Königstiger (1959)
- Die Götter reden nicht (1961)
- Figuren in Schwarz und Weiß (1964)
- Protokoll aus einem Zwischenreich (1975)
- Erfrorne Rosen (1979)
- Drei Flötentöne(1980)
- Papierschiffchen treiben. Erlebnis einer Kindheit (1987)
- ...und hat sein Geheimnis bewahrt (1991)
- Zauberer und Verzauaberte (1992)
- Der Genauigkeit zuliebe. Tagebücher 1942-1980 (1993)
- Sämtliche Gedichte 1940-1993 (1993)
