= Grazer Autorenversammlung =

Austrian writer's association

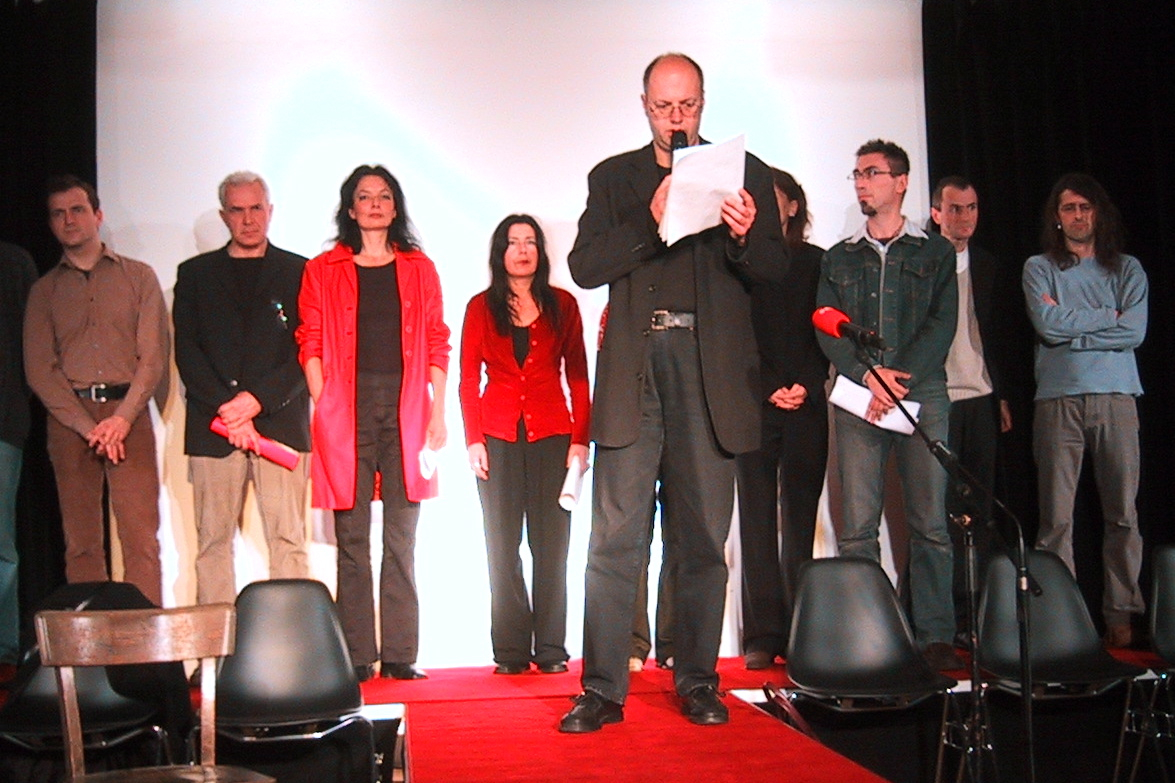
GAV group performance at the Literaturhaus Graz (2003)

The Grazer Autorinnen Autorenversammlung (GAV) was founded under the name of Grazer Autorenversammlung in March 1973 and is one of the two major Austrian writers' association (besides the Austrian PEN). H. C. Artmann was its first president. Other writers who contributed to the foundation of the association, were Friedrich Achleitner, Wolfgang Bauer, Georg Bydlinski, Barbara Frischmuth, Peter Handke, Ernst Jandl, Alfred Kolleritsch, Friederike Mayröcker, Reinhard Priessnitz, Peter Rosei, Gerhard Roth, Gerhard Rühm, Michael Scharang, and Oswald Wiener.

In the beginning, the GAV was located in Graz, but in 1975, its office moved to Vienna, which also now became the location for meetings of its executive committee. Today, the GAV is the largest writers' association in Austria.

== Sources ==
- Roland Innerhofer: Die Grazer Autorenversammlung (1973 - 1983). Zur Organisation einer "Avantgarde". Wien, Köln, Graz 1985. ISBN 3-205-07289-8
- Herbert Zeman (Ed.): Das 20. Jahrhundert, Geschichte der Literatur in Österreich Vol. 7, Akademische Druck- u. Verlagsanstalt, Graz 1999. ISBN 3-201-01687-X
- Klaus Zeyringer (Ed.): Österreichische Literatur seit 1945, Haymon Verlag, Innsbruck 2001. ISBN 3-85218-379-0
