= Österreichischer Schriftstellerverband =

Austrian association

The Austrian Writers' Association (German: Österreichischer Schriftstellerverband, abbr. OESV) has been founded in 1945 and was thus one of the first Austrian professional associations after World War II. The association fosters the communication between writers and the contact between authors and readers and is located in Vienna, Austria. Sidonia Gall is chairman of the OESV.

On a regular basis, the OESV runs author's readings in the Viennese Literaturhaus (House of Literature). Twice per year, the magazine Literarisches Österreich (Literary Austria) publishes essays and book reviews. The association published the following anthologies (in German) with texts of the ÖSV members:

== Anthologies ==
- Vom Wort zum Buch, Poetry. Edition Doppelpunkt, Vienna 1998, ISBN 3-85273-056-2
- Gedanken-Brücken, Prose. Edition Doppelpunkt, Vienna 2000, ISBN 3-85273-102-X
- Kaleidoskop, Prose. Edition Atelier, Vienna 2005, ISBN 3-902498-01-3

== Contests ==
In three years, the OESV hosted literature prizes for poetry:

- 2001 Wilhelm-Szabo-Lyrikwettbewerb
- 2006 Christine-Busta-Lyrikpreis
- 2010 Short prose contest on the theme "Sprachräume - Schreibwelten"

== Sources ==
- Herbert Zeman (Ed.): Das 20. Jahrhundert, Geschichte der Literatur in Österreich Vol. 7 (History of Literature in Austria), Akademische Druck- u. Verlagsanstalt, Graz 1999. ISBN 3-201-01687-X
- Klaus Zeyringer (Ed.): Österreichische Literatur seit 1945 (Austrian Literature since 1945), Haymon Verlag, Innsbruck 2001. ISBN 3-85218-379-0
