= Konrad Bayer =

Austrian writer and poet

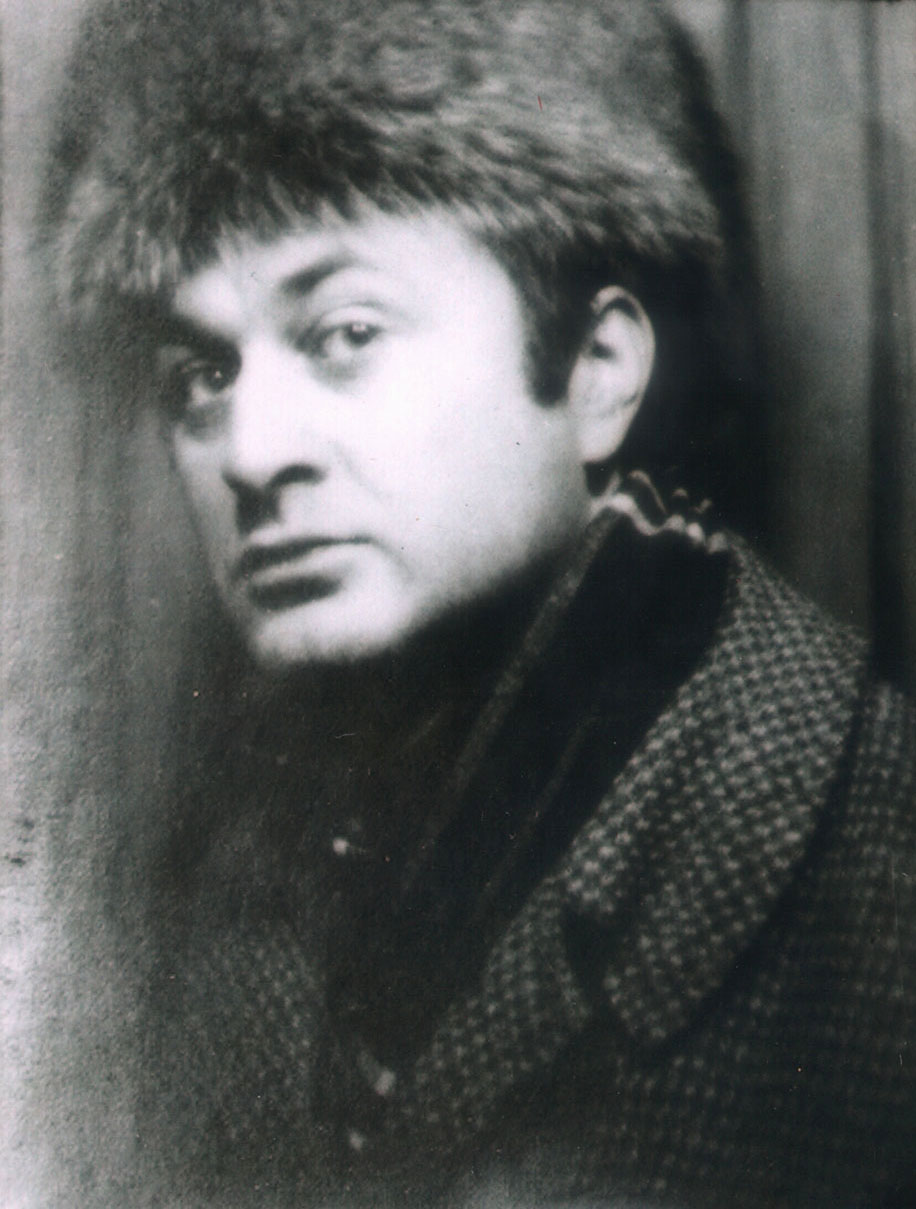
Konrad Bayer, Portrait, Automatenfoto, 1962–63

Konrad Bayer (17 December 1932 – October 1964) was an Austrian writer and poet. A member of the Wiener Gruppe, he combined apparently irreconcilable elements—violence, hermeticism, pessimism, ecstasy, banality—and influences (dadaism, surrealism, pataphysics, Wittgenstein, Stirner, Sade et al.)—into a bizarre linguistic solipsism which has held increasing fascination for German writers of the last few decades. His most important works are the novels Der Kopf des Vitus Bering (The Head of Vitus Bering) and Der sechste Sinn (The Sixth Sense), published posthumously in 1965 and 1966, respectively. Bayer committed suicide in October 1964 at the age of 31.

Bernd Alois Zimmermann included his poetry in his Requiem für einen jungen Dichter (Requiem for a Young Poet), completed in 1969.

== Works ==
- Selected Works of Konrad Bayer by Konrad Bayer, Atlas, London, ISBN 0-947757-06-6
- The Head of Vitus Bering by Konrad Bayer, , London, ISBN 0-947757-83-X
- The Sixth Sense by Konrad Bayer, , London, ISBN 1-900565-41-2

== Films ==
- Ferry Radax: Sonne halt! (Sun stop!, 1960). With Konrad Bayer. An experimental film produced in Italy and Switzerland. 26 min., black and white. On DVD since 2007.
- Ferry Radax: Konrad Bayer, oder: die welt bin ich und das ist meine sache (Konrad Bayer, or: the world am I and that's my business, 1969). An experimental portrait of Konrad Bayer and his suicide. 52 min., black and white. A mixture of documentary and fiction.
- Ferry Radax: Der Kopf des Vitus Bering (Vitus Bering's head, 1970). 26 min., black and white. An experimental mixture of documentary and fiction after a novel-montage by Konrad Bayer.
