= Austrian literature =

Austrian literature (German: Österreichische Literatur) is mostly written in German, and is closely connected with German literature.

== Origin and background ==
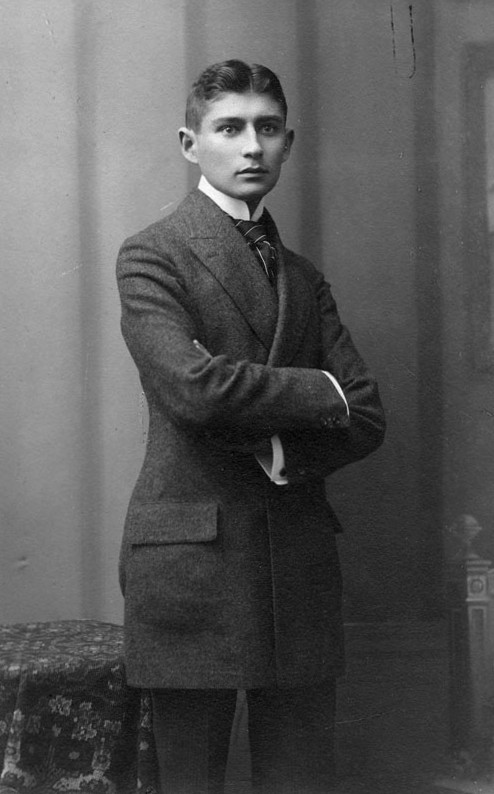
Franz Kafka

From the 19th century onward, Austria was the home of novelists and short-story writers, including Adalbert Stifter, Arthur Schnitzler, Franz Werfel, Stefan Zweig, Franz Kafka, Thomas Bernhard, Joseph Roth, and Robert Musil, and of poets Georg Trakl, Rose Ausländer, Franz Grillparzer, Rainer Maria Rilke, and Paul Celan. Famous contemporary playwrights and novelists include Elfriede Jelinek and Peter Handke, and well-known essayists such as Robert Menasse and Karl-Markus Gauß. Despite Austria's contributions to architecture and revered musical traditions, no Austrian literature made it to the classical canon until the 19th century. In the early 18th century, Lady Mary Wortley Montagu, whilst visiting Vienna, was stunned to meet no writers at all.

Several reasons can be given. First, the arts were the preserve of the imperial court, who saw culture as a political tool, as propaganda. Fine baroque palaces, imperial portraits, and commissions of music could all work very well to this aim, but literature was deemed less suitable and thus not encouraged. Second, the late emergence of German literature; while much was published in German, hardly had the caliber to become "classic" until the late 18th century, when Goethe and Schiller began writing. In Austria, the imperial state also censored all books mercilessly; The Sorrows of Young Werther, Goethe's novel depicting a young man's ecstatic love and suicide, spawned a string of copycat suicides across Germany, and many states banned the work, but Austrian authorities also banned Goethe's entire opus. It came mostly from Empress Maria Theresa's 'Chastity Commission', intended to uphold public morals, but it had the effect not only of creating a facade of decency but a stunted intellectual front. Perhaps the primary reason for Austria's late literary fruition was its cultural mindset. According to the cultural historian Carl Emil Schorske, 'profoundly Catholic, it was a deeply sensuous, plastic culture'. The outlook of a leisured aristocracy, it was copied by the lower classes. This mentality was not necessarily bad; the emphasis on beauty and fantasy was integral to establishing the imperial capital of Vienna, and it made Vienna the greatest center of music in Europe. But it was not the best ground for the literary experiment. Nevertheless, the liberalization of Austria in the late 19th century created a more dynamic climate for writing, which soon produced a flowering. Austrian literature was distinguished by its separation from the major currents of German literature. It also adopted a cultural and political conservatism in opposition to modern movements such as materialism and socialism, leading it to focus intensely on individual psychology, the obsession with death, and the philosophy of language.

== The search for a definition ==
The main problem of defining a dynamic development may be that any definition will fall short of the various currents which lead to a certain type of literature. Through the centuries, there have been different approaches, but most of them have been criticized to be biased - cultural, ideological, or political. Austrian literature developed out of a symbiosis of different regional traditions and languages.

In the Middle Ages, there was a homogeneous zone along the Danube River, spanning from Bavaria down to the eastern territories. Travelers and bards moved along this route, bringing with them new influences. At the same time Alps had their forbidding little valleys, which were virtually untouched - they developed their own regional culture.

This is important because it remains characteristic through the centuries. On the other hand, there were writers strictly in the tradition of a region (like towns, countries etc.) language or culture, on the other hand there was a continuous influence on each other's writing and thinking.

The multi-ethnic Habsburg monarchy, Austrian Empire and eventually Austro-Hungarian Empire should therefore not be reduced to the German parts of the empire. There were large ethnic or religious minorities in nearly all regional capitals, like Prague, Budapest or Vienna—microcosmi with their own traditions and characteristics.

Franz Kafka may be a good example: while in some of his writings he declared himself to be "German" this was meant more in relation to the ethnic minority living in Prague than as a declaration for another part of the empire. So perhaps he was a "German-speaking-secular-Jewish-Prague-born-Austro-Hungarian-Austro-Czech writer" - a term which best shows the difficulties that are to be faced.

Besides the national differences between the provinces, there were also different regions which influenced the writing style. There were Alps with their distinctive traditions, the deep woods, the coastal regions around Trieste (now Italy and Slovenia) and the Croatian islands, which served as the Austro-Hungarian equivalent to the French Côte d'Azur, a center for writers, painters and other artists at value - and that often-meant religious texts - were written down. In addition, most texts were also translated into Latin before they were put down (e.g. Germanic tribal laws).
Different sources however suggest that there also existed aristocratic historical records (like Heldenlieder), lyric folklore (dance, love songs, spells). Only by accident individual texts were preserved in monasteries. Examples for this are the "Merseburger Zaubersprüche", two Germanic spells being the only written proofs for pagan religion in the German-speaking lands. The "Hildebrandslied" is important as a voucher of Germanic hero literature.

The first German texts were written to translate Latin religious books around 750 in the early Middle Ages. The Benedictine communities in Melk and Salzburg were carrying on notable literary and religious activities. Ava (1060–1127), who was the first known German female writer, wrote in this religiously inspired tradition and lived in the territories which were then and now within the borders of Austria.

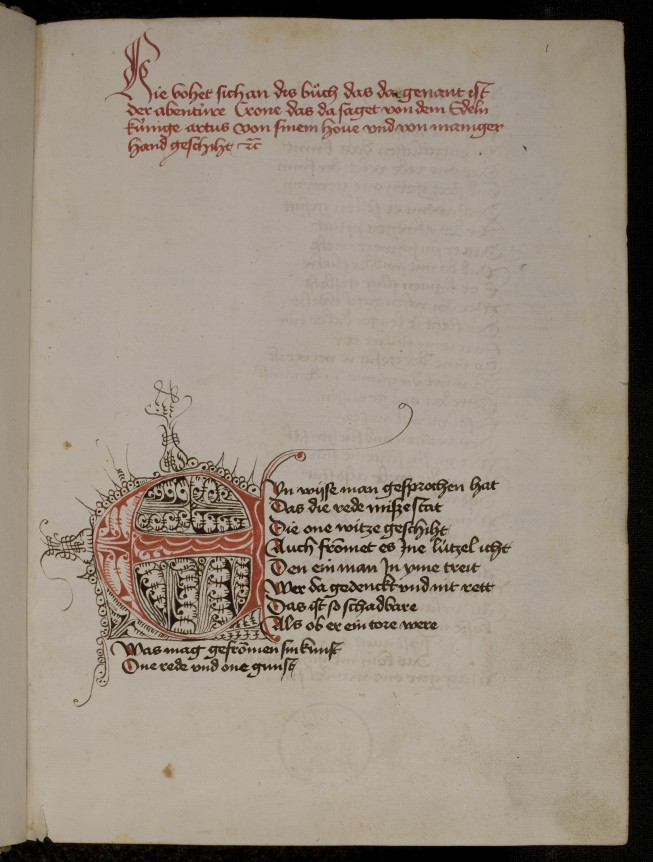
Heinrich von dem Tuerlîn: Diu Crône. Heidelberg, UB, cpg 374, 1r.

=== High and Late Middle Ages (1170–1500) ===
With the Crusades around 1160, knights became more important and prosperous. The oral minnesang was a new form, dealing with their love. The topics of the ballads were also more worldly with themes ranging from love and war to political criticism. There was a lot of travelling along the Danube River, with travelling bards (Minnesänger) bringing news and new songs. The towns were getting rich and independent. The first representatives of this movement and first known male writers in German were Der von Kürenberg and Dietmar von Aist (12th century). At the end of the 12th century, one of the most important literary works of the times, Nibelungenlied, emerged. It was created by an unknown minnesang poet most probably in the territories of Austria. As the tradition of minnesang grew, the older poets started teaching younger ones. For example, probably the most known German bard Walther von der Vogelweide (13th century) learnt his craft from Reinmar von Hagenau at the court in Vienna. Among other known minnesang poets are Neidhart, Jans der Enikel, Ulrich von Liechtenstein, and Oswald von Wolkenstein.

In the 12th century, satire was also developing. Seifried Helbling was an example of a writer who wrote texts of this type.

Later on, the minnesang, which was cultivated by knights, became a craft practiced by burghers – meistersingers. Its center was more to the west, in Nuremberg. Michael Beheim was a meistersinger poet strongly connected with the court in Vienna. Yet another form that developed at that time was drama. Especially, presentations of Passion were regularly played. Das Wiener Passionsspiel is worth mentioning here.

An Austrian representative of Holy Grail literature is Heinrich von dem Tuerlîn (also written Türlin). He wrote the poem Diu Crône, which has about 30,000 lines. The edition of the original text in Middle High German has completed recently by the Viennese Germanists Fritz Peter Knapp, Manuela Niesner (Part I, Altdeutsche Textbibliothek, Tübingen 2000), Alfred Ebenbauer and Florian Kragl (Part II, Altdeutsche Textbibliothek, Tübingen 2005), who are preparing a translation to Modern German.

=== Renaissance ===
Around 1600, humanism, with its rediscovery of ancient cultures and ideals, spread from Italy throughout Europe. Emperor Maximilian I was a big supporter of this movement. He managed to gather around his court in Vienna humanists such as Conrad Celtes – the founder of Collegium Poetarum or in the later time poet laureat Vadian (Joachim von Watt) who wrote in Latin. Eleonore of Austria translated to German a widely read French adventure novel Pontus et la belle Sidonie. Big figures of the Catholic Church of that time Nicholas of Cusa and Petrus Canisius were connected with the Austrian court and a few of their works were written in German.

=== Baroque ===
The Thirty Years War had multiple effects on European literary trends; some writers based their work on the sufferings of the time, or withdrew into writings of a religious nature. Others responded with escapism, providing beautiful and peaceful worlds readers could flee to. The humorous stories (Schelmenromane) brought relief to the suffering people. This trend is apparent with Abraham a Sancta Clara's religious and comical works, and Catharina Regina von Greiffenberg's religious poetry.

As a reaction to the Protestant movements of the Reformation, which rocked the Catholic-led Habsburg territories, many Catholic schools emerged on the territories of Austria. These colleges led by the Jesuit order developed plays and operas that were Italian in style and impressed most by their luxurious equipment. Sermons were an important genre of baroque literature, rooted as it was in the Counter-Reformation. The aforementioned Benedictine monk Abraham a Sancta Clara was a notable preacher of the times. A Jesuit, Georg Scherer, is another example of a monk whose sermons were published and had a wider audience.

Another literary form were improvised plays called "Hanswurstspiele". This direction was represented by Josef Anton Stranitzky, Gottfried Prehauser, Joachim Perinet and Josef Felix von Kurz-Bernardon.

Examples of baroque epic are the chivalric fiction and "Schelmenromane" of Johann Beer, which represent a realistic description of the reality at that time.

=== Enlightenment ===
With the start of Enlightenment around 1720, philosophy and the need of literature to educate the reader (Lehrdichtung, Bildungsroman) were two new and strong motivations for literature.

Aristotle and his school of thinking was revived. These ideas developed on the territories of Austria during the rule of Maria Theresa and her son Joseph II. Around 1790 the ideas of Enlightenment were firmly rooted and the ancient classic cultures (Greek and Roman) were the inspiration for poets, artists, architects and writers. Harmony and Beauty were some of the ideals of that time.

Austrian literature was also under the strong influence of Freemasonry and strongly connected with the criticism towards clergy. All of these circumstances caused the literature to become more educative and instructional. Satire started to be one of the most frequently used literary genres.

The literary life of Enlightenment concentrated around an almanac Wienerischer Musen-Almanach. It was started in 1777 (from 1786 under a changed title Wiener Musen-Almanach) by Joseph Franz von Ratschky and Gottlieb von Leon. Aloys Blumauer was also its editor since 1781 (he even edited a few editions alone).

A notable poet in the Austrian literature of this period has Johann Baptist von Alxinger who wrote chivalric epics Doolin von Maynz (1787) and Bliomberis (1791) which were inspired by the tradition of Freemasonry. Alxinger also wrote poetry based on anticlerical ideas.

The writings of a might-have-been monk Johann Pezzl also had a profile of this kind. He wrote journalistic and epic texts.

Classical vision of poetry promoted by Joseph Schreyvogel strongly influenced later authors (for instance Franz Grillparzer). Schreyvogel improved considerably the quality of the Austrian theatre. He was a dramatic adviser at the Wiener Burgtheater from 1814 to 1832.

Another important dramatist was Johann Nepomuk von Kalchberg, but historical themes of his dramas give his work the flavour of Romanticism.

=== First half of 19th century ===
Around 1790 these ideas were firmly rooted and the ancient classic cultures (Greek and Roman) were the inspiration for poets, artists, architects and writers. Harmony and Beauty were some of the ideals of that time. There was a lot of philosophical and aesthetic writing which accumulated in the Romantic era around 1820 (mostly writers from the nobility). With the Napoleonic Wars going on, a lot of people wanted literature which took them away in a fantasy world. A lot of religious writing was also providing people with new hope. Klemens Maria Hofbauer, Eduard von Bauernfeld and Franz Grillparzer are but three of the writers influenced by these events. The German writer Karl Wilhelm Friedrich von Schlegel also lived and worked in Vienna around 1809.

Between the years 1815, the end of the Napoleonic Wars, and 1848, the year of the European revolutions the Biedermeier contrasted with the Romantic era which preceded it partly.

The first trend is growing urbanization and industrialization leading to a new urban middle class. The early Lieder of Schubert, which were performable at the piano without substantial musical training, serve as examples. Further, Biedermeier writers were mainly middle-class, as opposed to the German Romantics, who were mainly drawn from the nobility. The second trend is the growing political oppression following the end of the Napoleonic Wars prompting people to concentrate on the domestic and the non-political.

=== Biedermeier ===
Biedermeier refers to work in the fields of literature, music, the visual arts and interior design in the period between the years 1815 (Congress of Vienna), the end of the Napoleonic Wars, and 1848, the year of the European revolutions and contrasts with the Romantic era which preceded it.

Biedermeier can be identified with two trends in early 19th-century German history.

The first trend is growing urbanization and industrialization leading to a new urban middle class. The early Lieder of Schubert, which were performable at the piano without substantial musical training, serve as examples. Further, Biedermeier writers were mainly middle-class, as opposed to the Romantics, who were mainly drawn from the nobility.

The second trend is the growing political oppression following the end of the Napoleonic Wars prompting people to concentrate on the domestic and (at least in public) the non-political. The strict publication rules and the censorship had the consequence, that the main topics written about were unpolitical, e.g. Historical Fiction or Books about the quiet life in the countryside. This does not mean that there was not a lot of political discussion going on, but it happened at home and in the presence of close friends. This explosive situation finally led to the revolutions in Europe in the year 1848.

Poets of that time in Austria were Nikolaus Lenau (1802–1850) and Franz Grillparzer. The latter is often mentioned as a representative of Austrian Classicism in literature.

Playwrights at that time were Franz Grillparzer (1791–1872), Friedrich Halm (1806–1871) - also an accomplished writer of "Novellen" (novellas) such as the powerful and thematically rich Das Auge Gottes and Das Haus an der Veronabrücke -, Johann Nepomuk Nestroy (1801–1862) and Ferdinand Raimund (1790–1836). Grillparzer wrote tragedies in the tradition of the "Weimarer Klassik", Nestroy and Raimund were representatives for the "Wiener Volksstück" mainly played at the Viennese theater "Volkstheater Wien".

Charles Sealsfield - a pseudonym of Karl Postl - lived a long time in the US and wrote novels set in the Wild West. On the other hand, he managed to write about Austria and to criticize the Austrian absolutism during Biedermeier without being recognized by Austrian authorities.

The end of Biedermeier is marked by the writings of Adalbert Stifter (1805–1868). His first work Nachsommer was published in 1857 but was still believed to be one of the finest works of biedermeier. Stifter not only influenced Peter Rosegger but also German writers like Ganghofer, Heyse, Freytag, Wildenbruch and later authors (the time of "Bürgerlichen Realismus") like Storm, Fontane and through them Thomas Mann and Hesse.

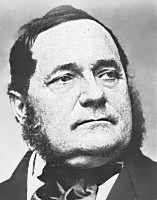
Adalbert Stifter

=== Realism ===
Austrian writers of Realism are primarily the writer of short novels Ferdinand von Saar, Marie von Ebner-Eschenbach and the aforementioned Adalbert Stifter. Marie von Ebner-Eschenbach is known for her psychological novels and novellas as well as for her social engagement. Ferdinand Kürnberger was a novelist much like Leopold von Sacher-Masoch, who became famous with Venus in Furs - the erotic behavior he described, would later be called masochism according to his name.

Another writer to mention is Bertha von Suttner. She wrote social novels whose literary quality usually is not appreciated highly by literary critiques and Germanists, but Suttner received the Nobel Prize for Peace for her novel Die Waffen nieder (Lay down your arms) in 1905.

While in Germany Realism paved the way for Naturalism, a similar literary movement has never developed in Austria. Instead, the successors were Jugendstil and Expressionism.

== 20th century ==
=== First half of the 20th century ===
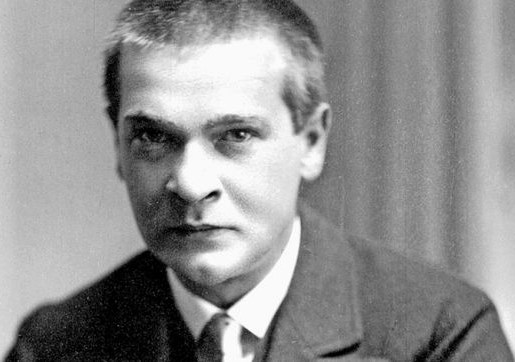
Georg Trakl

The Jugendstil movement was primarily a cultural movement of architecture and decorative arts. However, Viennese Jugendstil was marked by the presence of artists of every genre, including compositors and writers. Viennese writers, such as Arthur Schnitzler and Stefan Zweig, are often included in this movement. Arthur Schnitzler was a very typical writer of that time. He wrote his major works between 1890 and the end of World War I, namely novels, short stories and theater plays.

A very important center of Austrian literature during the ca. 20 years before the end of World War I was Prague. It was the center of many German-speaking, mostly Jewish, authors who contributed significantly to Austrian and partly even to world literature. Their influence endured until the 1930s. Authors to mention are Oskar Baum, Max Brod, Franz Kafka, the journalist Egon Erwin Kisch, Gustav Meyrink, Robert Musil, Rainer Maria Rilke, Franz Werfel, and Oskar Wiener.

Expressionism was presented primarily by the poet Georg Trakl and the dramatist and narrator Hugo von Hofmannsthal, both originating from Salzburg.

During the First World War, Austrian literature exhibited a wide range of ideological positions, from patriotic enthusiasm to pacifist critique. Many Austrian writers, such as Hugo von Hofmannsthal, Stefan Zweig, Franz Werfel, and Robert Musil, were involved in the War Archives (Kriegspressequartier), producing propaganda and cultural material that supported the Austro-Hungarian war effort. These works often romanticized the war or presented it as a cultural or spiritual renewal.

At the same time, a number of authors began to express disillusionment and criticism. Karl Kraus’s satirical drama Die letzten Tage der Menschheit (The Last Days of Mankind, 1919–1922) portrayed the war as a tragic and absurd spectacle shaped by propaganda and bureaucratic incompetence. Likewise, writers such as Andreas Latzko and Albert Ehrenstein emphasized the psychological trauma, physical destruction, and senselessness of modern warfare in their poetry and prose.

Literature from this period also depicted the challenges of post-war reintegration. Novels by Joseph Roth and Leo Perutz explored the identity crisis of returning soldiers and the dissolution of the Habsburg Empire, reflecting a broader cultural shift from imperial nostalgia to modern uncertainty.

The end of World War I reduced Austria to a very small and mainly German-speaking country. Some Austrian (and German writing) authors relocated to new emerging countries, such as Kafka and Werfel to Czechoslovakia. Others, such as Robert Musil, Rainer Maria Rilke, and Elias Canetti, migrated to Vienna. The political rupture and the fact that this small German-speaking Austria had lost most of its territory, industry, and agriculture, led to the fatal conviction of many Austrians that only a union with Germany would be able to save the country from a total downfall, a conviction which paved the way to its later annexation by Hitler in 1938. The texts of some writers give an insight to this conviction. Robert Musil and Hugo von Hofmannsthal expressed their "German centric" point of view, while others, such as Stefan Zweig, Franz Werfel and Alexander Lernet-Holenia, strictly spoke up for Austria and Austrian tradition and culture.

The time between the two world wars gave way to rich literature in Austria. Robert Musil wrote the well-known novel The Man without Qualities, Stefan Zweig published a multitude of essays, stories and novels, Karl Kraus edited the magazine Die Fackel (The Torch), for which he wrote almost all articles by himself, Franz Werfel wrote some of his best novels, e.g. The Forty Days of Musa Dagh which narrates the Armenian tragedy of 1915, and after Franz Kafka's death, his life-time friend Max Brod began to publish Kafka's unfinished novels. Later Nobel Prize winner Elias Canetti studied and lived in Vienna and wrote his only novel Auto-da-Fe, before the Anschluss he fled to England. In analogy to Musil's Kakania (from the anagram for the k. u. k., i.e. imperial and royal monarchy till 1918), Fritz von Herzmanovsky-Orlando created Tarockania for the weird figures of his humorous novels and stories.

=== Austrofascism and Nazi dictatorship ===
Catholic and conservative Austrofascism came into power after the Austrian Civil War and revitalized censorship. A more important influence on Austrian literature resulted however from Nazi empowerment in Germany in 1933. Not only the majority of German speaking readers live in Germany, but almost all large and important publishers for literature in German are situated in Germany as well. In 1933 it came to a breakup at the P.E.N. conference in Dubrovnik. The members discussed an official protest against the prosecution of writers and the burning of books by the Nazis. In consequence the German delegation left the conference and referred to the organization's principle not to interfere with politics. Some members of the Austrian delegation solidarized with the Germans, while others supported the resolution. This breakup continued afterwards in Vienna and led to a separation of liberal and "German nationalistic" authors; the latter left the Austrian PEN Club and later worshipped Hitler and his annexation of Austria. Nazi Germany observed the events carefully, boycotted immediately the liberal authors, who couldn't go on publishing in Germany and lost most of their readers and income. After the annexation, these authors were prosecuted as well as their German counterparts for years, and many of them, especially the Jewish, were murdered or forced to emigration.

Stefan Zweig flew to Brazil, Franz Werfel escaped to the US together with the German writer Heinrich Mann, Elias Canetti to England. Others, like Jura Soyfer, were killed by the Nazis. In 2007, the Theodor Kramer Society published an anthology of Austrian poetry written in exile, under the title In welcher Sprache träumen Sie? (Which Language Do You Dream In?). The editors present 278 authors whose names in many cases have been wiped out. The better known among them are Ilse Aichinger, Franz Theodor Csokor, Albert Drach, Albert Paris Gütersloh, Hermann Hakel, Theodor Kramer, Josef Luitpold Stern, Felix Pollak, Paula von Preradović, Joseph Roth, Hilde Spiel, Wilhelm Szabo, Hans Weigel, Stefan Zweig.

During the Nazi dictatorship, which had factually wiped out the Austrian state, the Austrian PEN Club was in exile in London and continued its work in Austria from 1946 on. Until 1973, PEN was the only Austrian writers' organization of importance.

=== After World War II: Group of Vienna ===
The literature after World War II combined many different movements. While some authors were in search for reorientation, such as Ilse Aichinger, Ingeborg Bachmann, Heimito von Doderer, Alexander Lernet-Holenia, Gerhard Fritsch and Hans Lebert, others came back from concentration camps, such as Jean Améry, from former (in times of monarchy) Austrian territories, such as Rose Ausländer and Paul Celan, or from exile, such as Hans Weigel and Friedrich Torberg, while others again did not come back from exile, such as Hermann Broch or Franz Werfel. On the other hand, some former "Nazi" writers kept their positions, such as Max Mell, Franz Nabl and Karl Heinrich Waggerl. The latter and other, catholic, writers began to form a very conservative block within the Austrian literature. Through the Austrian PEN Club, they even seemed to control statal subsidies for literature as well as literary awards till the 1970s.

Some authors had good relations to the Group 47 based in Germany or were members. Among them Ilse Aichinger who published the novel Die größere Hoffnung (Greater Hope) and the narrator and poet Ingeborg Bachmann. Both were awarded the Group 47 Prize for Literature. Other Austrian members of the Group 47 were Paul Celan and Erich Fried. While Celan, after some time in Vienna, went to live in Paris, Fried moved to Berlin. In 1954, the Wiener Gruppe (Group of Vienna) was formed by H. C. Artmann and others. Friedrich Achleitner, Konrad Bayer, Gerhard Rühm and Oswald Wiener belonged to the group, as well as Ernst Jandl and Friederike Mayröcker.

Hans Lebert wrote the novel Wolfshaut (Wolf's Skin), in which he described a fictional village named Schweigen (Silence), an allegory for the silence of many Austrians after the Nazi dictatorship, who pretended to know nothing about what had happened in their country.

Several volumes of Diaries contain the war memories of Heimito von Doderer. However, this author was best known for his novels, which he designed meticulously, such as The Strudlhof Steps, The Demons, The Waterfalls of Slunj, and The Merowingians. Doderer influenced many other authors with his novelistic art, e.g., Robert Schindel.

Following the end of World War II, Austrian intellectuals played a crucial role in reconstructing the idea of a distinct Austrian literature, as part of a broader effort to establish a separate Austrian national identity. Writers and critics such as Heimito von Doderer, Friedrich Heer, and Ivar Ivask contributed to shaping public discourse by advocating for Austrian literature as culturally and historically distinct from German literary traditions.Their essays from the 1950s and 1960s argued that Austria’s literary heritage was rooted in a supranational, Catholic-Baroque culture, with historical ties to the Habsburg Empire and the Roman tradition, rather than the Protestant-idealist model dominant in German narratives.

This discourse emphasized the contributions of authors like Grillparzer, Stifter, Rilke, and Musil, positioning them as foundational to an Austrian literary canon. Critics also highlighted the influence of Vienna as a multicultural imperial center, and the overlooked role of Bohemia and Moravia in shaping Austrian literary sensibilities. The concept of "Austrian literature" was thus framed not solely by linguistic or political boundaries, but by cultural memory and intellectual tradition shaped by Austria’s unique historical trajectory.

=== 1970–2000 ===
In 1973, a new writers' association was founded in Graz (Styria), mostly as a protest against the conservatism of P.E.N. and their controlling position, e.g. concerning literature prizes. The new association was called Grazer Autorenversammlung (GAV). Among its founders and first members include Barbara Frischmuth, Peter Handke, Ernst Jandl, Alfred Kolleritsch, Friederike Mayröcker, and Michael Scharang. Eventually, the GAV became the largest writers' association in Austria with more than 500 members.

The end of the 1960s and eventually the 1970s were characterized by experimental theater plays. Peter Handke tried out new ways of theater communication with his play Offending the Audience in 1966.Ernst Jandl and Friederike Mayröcker wrote a new sort of experimental poetry, Konkrete Poesie, working with the sounds of speech than with semantics.

One of the most important writers after World War II was Thomas Bernhard (1931–1989). He wrote nine novels, several books of stories and short prose, some autobiographical works, and numerous plays. His works triggered public controversies as Bernhard constantly attacked a typical Austrian manner of ignoring the Nazi past. One of the dramas is called Heldenplatz, an open allusion to Vienna's central imperial place, from which Adolf Hitler had held his first speech after the country's annexation by Nazi German troops in front of hundreds of thousands of cheering Austrians.

Marianne Fritz (1948–2007) was known as a novelist. Her third novel, Dessen Sprache du nicht verstehst (Whose speech you don't understand), was published in 1985. On more than three thousand pages, Fritz describes a linguistic and fictional universe that deals with the decline of the Austrian empire. She used an artificial language that broke many linguistic norms, to achieve a more rhythmic speech. Marianne Fritz intensified this individual esthetics with her fourth and fifth novel.

During the 1980s, especially after the political scandal around former UN secretary and eventually Austrian federal president Kurt Waldheim, a new and more distinctive Jewish literature formed. Robert Schindel published the novel Gebirtig, which deals with a contemporary Jewish society within Austria and the difficult memories of the Shoah. Robert Menasse is known for his novels and especially for his essays on Austria. Another author who works with Jewish topics is Doron Rabinovici.

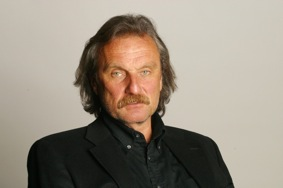
Christoph Ransmayr (Foto: Johannes Cizek)

Christoph Ransmayr mixes historical facts with fiction. The acclaimed novel Morbus Kithara creates a scenario, in which Austria did not get aid from the Marshall Plan after World War II and was condemned to become an exclusively agrarian country. On this background, the author writes about the time after the war, about ex-soldiers, ex-Nazis and concentration camp survivors, and thus depicts the complexity of post-war Austria.

Josef Haslinger wrote the novel Opernball, in which he described a fictitious attack at the Vienna Opera Ball, in which all attendants, incl. the entire Austrian government, is killed by combat gas. This attack brings a new fascist party to power, which a handful of idealistic journalists try to tell the world. Haslinger is also the author of an essay about the Waldheim affair. Also Milo Dor, a born Serb who wrote all of his books in German and became a very important figure in Austria's literary scene, chose the danger of ultra-right wing parties as topic for one of his narrative texts, Wien, Juli 1999. Other books describe the destiny of immigrants after the world war.

Essays have also a tradition in Austrian literature. While the roots may be found with Franz Grillparzer, Hermann Bahr and especially Karl Kraus, one of the most important essayists after World War II is Jean Améry whose oeuvre primarily consists of essays, articles and critiques. The historian and scholar Friedrich Heer is the author of about fifty thousand pages, most of them essays on Austrian and European topics, on history and philosophy as well as on religion and literature. A younger representative of Austrian essayism is Karl-Markus Gauß who writes for several newspapers and magazines in Austria, Switzerland and Germany. His books speak about Central and Eastern European peoples, cultures, and literatures. He is also the editor in chief of the magazine Literatur und Kritik.

Authors in Slovene, originating in Carinthia, are, amongst others, Maja Haderlap, Florjan Lipuš, Cvetka Lipuš and Janko Messner. Usually they write either exclusively in Slovene, or both in German and Slovene. Another famous Carinthian writer, Peter Handke, has translated several works from Slovene to German.

=== Nobel Prizes for Literature ===
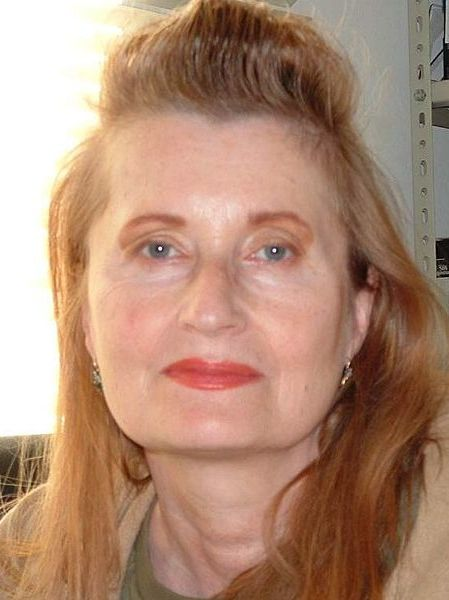
Elfriede Jelinek

In 1981, Elias Canetti (1905–1994) received the Nobel Prize in Literature. Born in Bulgaria, he spent much of his early adult life in Vienna, and wrote all his books in German. In 1938, following Austria's Anschluss with Germany, Canetti moved to London, becoming a British subject. During his later years, he also lived in Zürich, Switzerland. Among his most acclaimed works are the novel, Auto-da-Fe, and his work of nonfiction, Crowds and Power. His three volumes of well-acclaimed memoirs are also seen to give a personal insight into Austrian society during the decades preceding World War II.

In 2004, Elfriede Jelinek (*1946) received the Nobel Prize in Literature for her "musical flow of voices and counter-voices in novels and plays that, with extraordinary linguistic zeal, reveal the absurdity of society's clichés and their subjugating power". Her works comprise novels such as The Piano Teacher, Lust and Die Kinder der Toten (Children of the Dead), as well as theater plays such as Clara S., Burgtheater and Bambiland. In the 1960s she began to write poetry and stories.

== 21st century ==
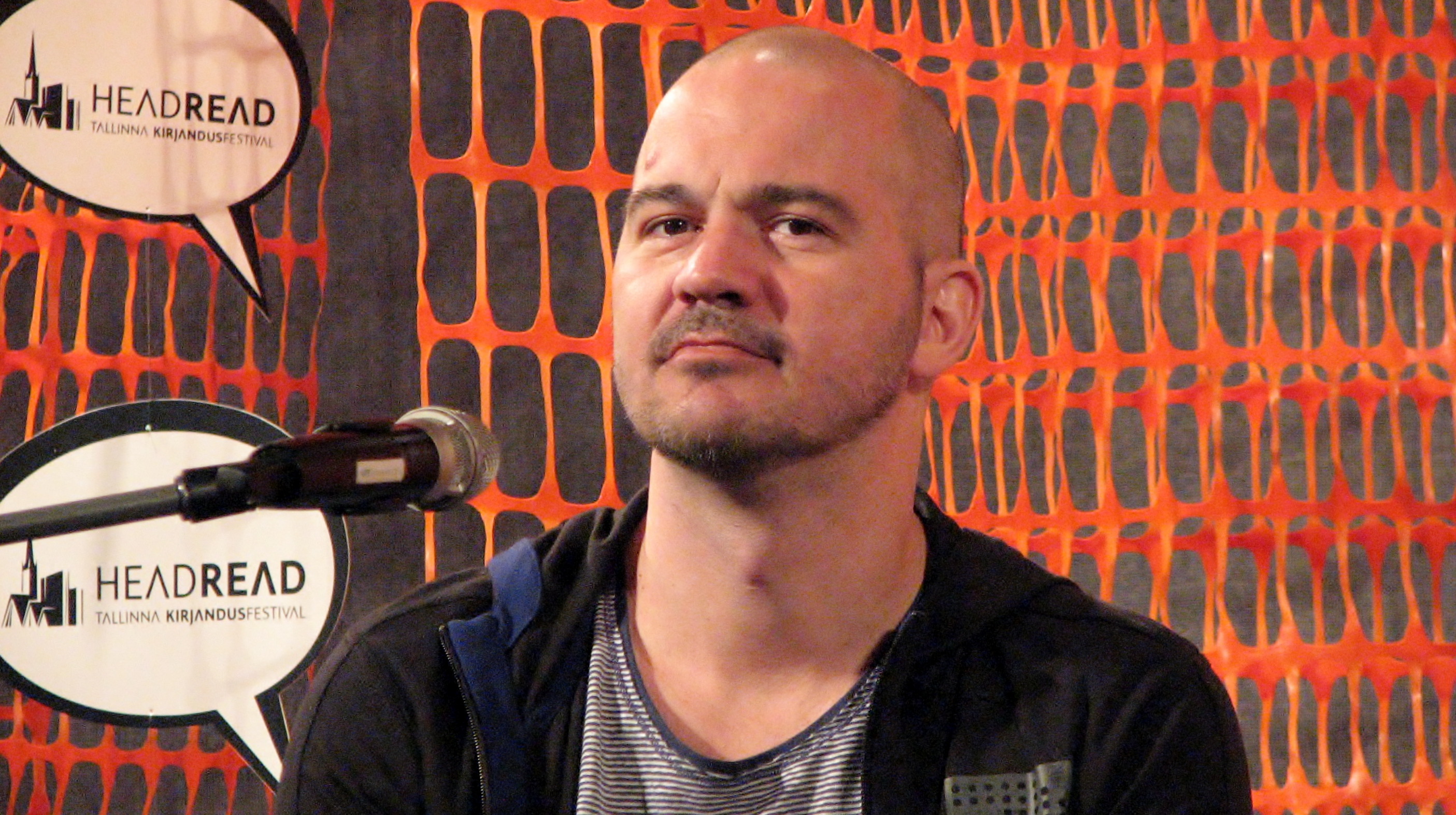
Writer Thomas Glavinic at the HeadRead festival (2012)

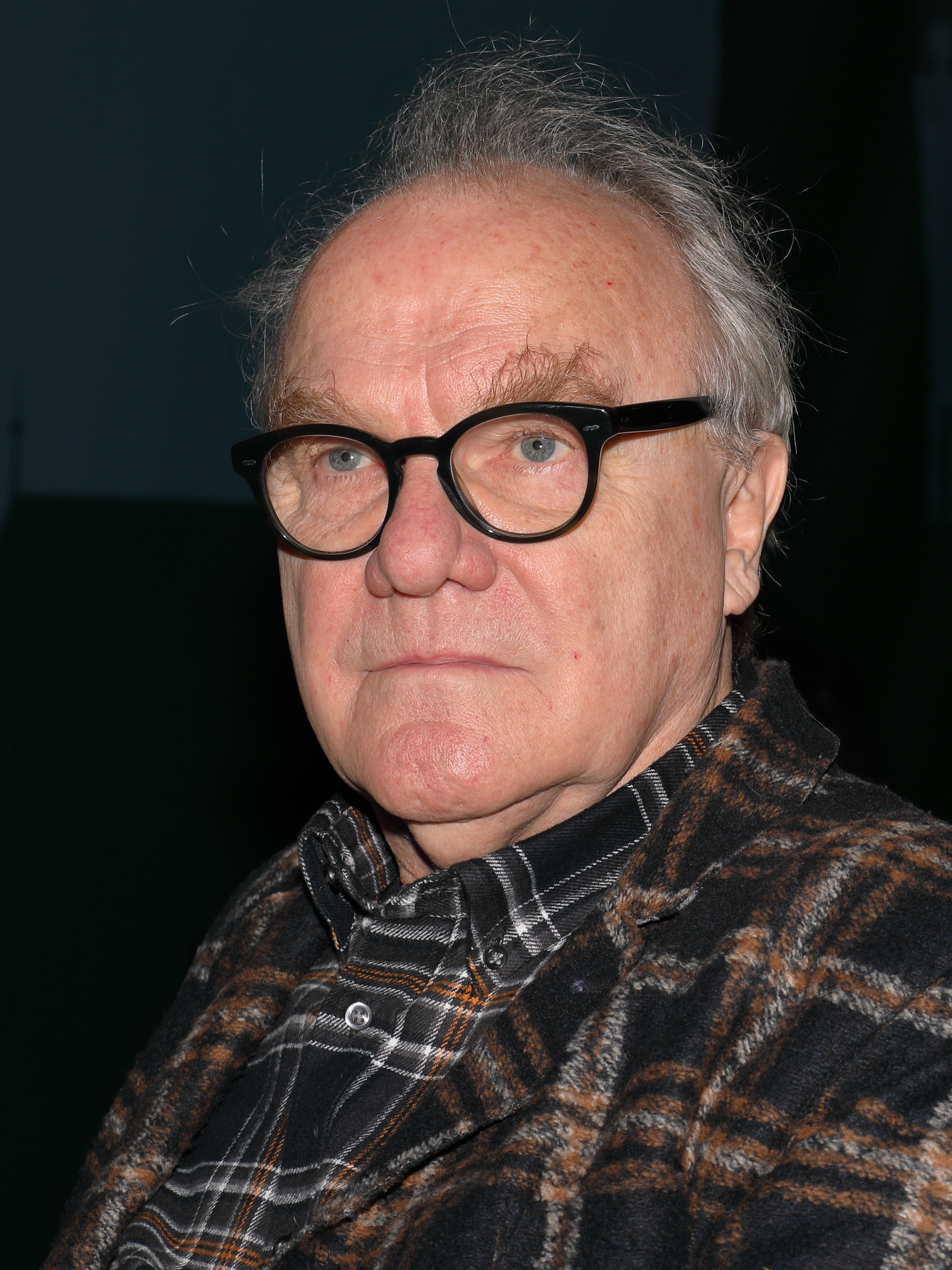
Writer Michael Köhlmeier (2025)

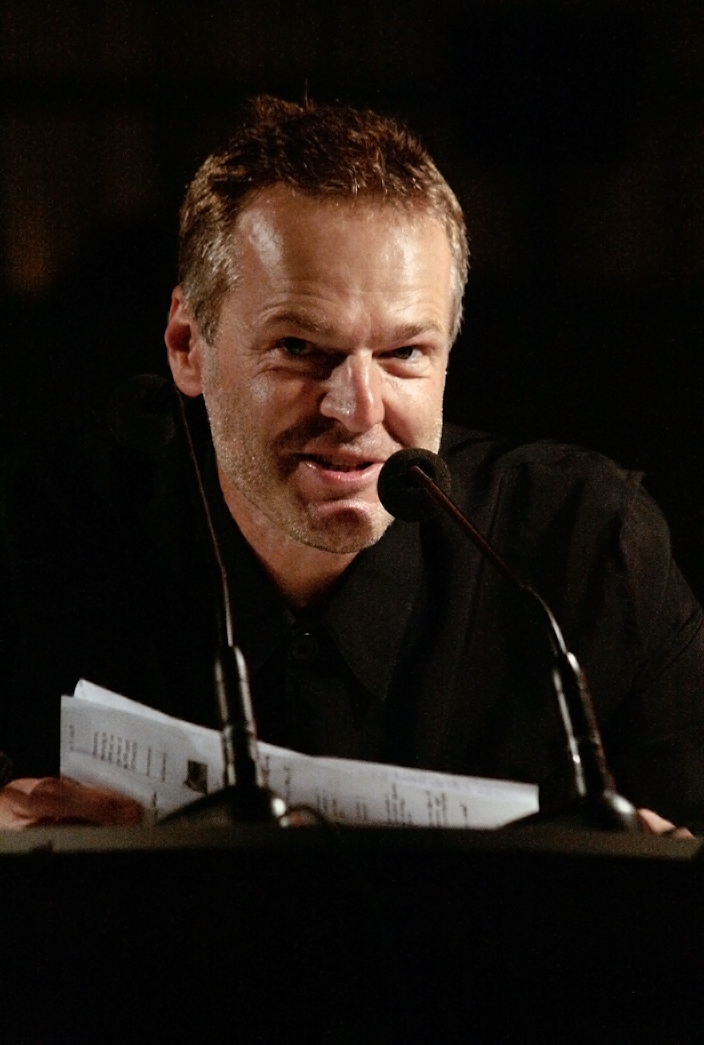
Writer Wolf Haas reading at the literary festival o-töne in Vienna (2009)

While some of the well-known authors, such as Franzobel, Peter Handke, Peter Henisch, Elfriede Jelinek, Gerhard Roth, and Robert Schneider, still publish regularly, there are rich literary movements, mostly driven by a younger generation. In some cases, literary magazines play an important role in gathering writers and fostering their works.

=== Literary magazines and publishers ===
Literatur und Kritik and Erostepost are published in Salzburg, Manuskripte, Sterz, Schreibkraft and Lichtungen in Graz, Wespennest and Kolik in Vienna, Cognac & Biskotten in Innsbruck, DUM in Lower Austria. They count among the most traditional and important literary magazines in contemporary Austria. In addition, the literary magazine Buchkultur has been around since 1989.

Notable publishing houses include Residenz, Droschl, Haymon, Zsolnay, and Deuticke. Residenz played an important role during the 1970s and 1980s, when numerous important Austrian writers were published there. Especially smaller publishers, such as Arovell, Drava, FZA-Verlag, Mitter, Otto Müller, Pichler, Ritter, Skarabaeus, Sonderzahl, Wieser, etc. bring emerging and younger authors to the public. On the other hand, many Austrian writers publish their books in Germany, which offers much larger and powerful publishing houses. Of course, the economic regrouping of publishing houses and their mergers have also an influence on Austrian publishers. Thus, Zsolnay and Deuticke already belong to the German publishing group Hanser.

=== Literature awards and subsidies ===
In addition to subsidies and awards financed and organized by the Austrian and federal governments, several smaller literary prizes award Austrian and other German writing authors. Alfred-Gesswein-Literaturpreis, Erostepost-Literaturpreis, Franz-Kafka-Preis, Feldkircher Lyrikpreis, Wiener Werkstattpreis, Anton-Wildgans-Preis, and Manuskripte-Preis belong to this aspect of Austrian literature.

The scholar Klaus Zeyringer states that public subsidies represent the backbone of today's literary production and especially publishing in Austria, and this would be one reason why the frame conditions obviously differ from those in Germany. Public subsidies add to the funding of publishing houses, literary magazines, public events, book publications, and to writer's income. Zeyringer points out that on one hand this custom also enables the publication of non-mainstream and complicated literary works but on the other hand reduces the awareness of the necessity of adequate marketing activities of many cultural organizations, including publishers.

=== Contemporary authors ===
Book publications, magazines, public readings and literary prizes chronicle a multitude of writers, including novelists, playwrights, prosaists, essayists and poets. These include Marie Anders, Reinhold Aumaier, Zdenka Becker, Adelheid Dahimène, Dimitré Dinev, Martin Dragosits, Klaus Ebner, Günter Eichberger, Olga Flor, Karin Geyer, Thomas Glavinic, Constantin Göttfert, Marianne Gruber, Egyd Gstättner, Wolf Haas, Klaus Händl, Ludwig Laher, Gabriel Loidolt, Wolfgang Kauer, Daniel Kehlmann, Michael Köhlmeier, Melamar, Hanno Millesi, Gabriele Petricek, Judith Nika Pfeifer, Wolfgang Pollanz, Doron Rabinovici, Julya Rabinowich, Sophie Reyer, Kathrin Röggla, Gudrun Seidenauer, Linda Stift, Erwin Uhrmann, Vladimir Vertlib, Philipp Weiss, Christine Werner, Peter Paul Wiplinger. Usually these authors publish not only in Austria, but also in Germany and Switzerland.

=== Cultural melting pot ===
In its history, the country and Austrian literature have been a cultural melting pot that put together different ethnicities, ideas, and cultures. Today, this element has shrunk enormously but is still not wiped out. Examples of this are novelist Zdenka Becker who emigrated from Slovakia, Dimitré Dinev from Bulgaria, and Vladimir Vertlib who was born in Russia. Very often their topics have to do with immigration and interculturality.

There is some literature written by members of the autochthonous minorities in Austria. To mention the daughter of Florjan Lipuš, the poet Cvetka Lipuš, who has lived in the US for several years. Her poetry has been published in Slovene and in German.

Some authors have chosen to live in countries other than Austria, while still writing literature in German. Their experiences living in another country have some impact on their writing. For example, Marlene Streeruwitz and Ann Cotten live in Berlin, Raoul Schrott lived several years in Ireland and also Christoph Ransmayr has moved there.

== See also ==
- List of Austrian writers
- List of Austrian women writers
- Austrian Literature Online

== Sources (books) ==
- Heer, Friedrich: Der Kampf um die österreichische Identität. Böhlau Verlag, Wien 1981/1996/2001, ISBN 3-205-99333-0
- Herz-Kestranek, Miguel, Konstantin Kaiser and Daniela Strigl (Ed.): In welcher Sprache träumen Sie? Österreichische Exillyrik. Verlag der Theodor Kramer Gesellschaft, Wien 2007, ISBN 978-3-901602-25-2
- Zeman, Herbert and Fritz P. Knapp (Ed.): Geschichte der Literatur in Österreich. 7 volumes, Akademische Druck- und Verlagsanstalt, Vienna 1994ff., Vol. 1: ISBN 978-3-201-01611-7, Vol. 2: ISBN 978-3-201-01721-3 and ISBN 978-3-201-01812-8, Vol. 7: ISBN 978-3-201-01687-2
- Zeyringer, Klaus: Österreichische Literatur seit 1945. Haymon Verlag, Innsbruck 2001, ISBN 978-3-85218-379-4
- Žmegač, Viktor (Ed.): Kleine Geschichte der deutschen Literatur. Von den Anfängen bis zur Gegenwart. Marix, Wiesbaden 2004. ISBN 3-937715-24-X
