= Ronald Wallace (poet) =

American poet

Ronald Wallace is an American poet, and Felix Pollak Professor of Poetry & Halls-Bascom Professor of English at the University of Wisconsin–Madison.

== Life ==
He was born in Cedar Rapids, Iowa He grew up in Saint Louis, Missouri. He graduated from the College of Wooster, and the University of Michigan.

His work has appeared in The New Yorker, The Atlantic, The Nation, Poetry, and The Paris Review.

== Works ==
- For Dear Life, University of Pittsburgh, 2015
- For a Limited Time Only, University of Pittsburgh, 2008, ISBN 9780822959960
- Now You See it: Poems. UW-Madison Libraries Parallel Press. 2005. ISBN 978-1-893311-57-2.
- Long for this world: new and selected poems, University of Pittsburgh Press, 2003, ISBN 9780822958147
- Uses of Adversity, University of Pittsburgh Press, 1998, ISBN 9780822938682
- The Makings of Happiness, University of Pittsburgh Press, 1991, ISBN 9780822954484
- People and Dog in the Sun, University of Pittsburgh Press, 1987, ISBN 9780822935520
- Tunes for Bears to Dance To, University of Pittsburgh Press, 1983, ISBN 9780822934813
- Plums, Stones, Kisses & Hooks, University of Missouri Press, 1982, ISBN 9780826204004

Short story

- Quick bright things: stories, Mid-List Press, 2000, ISBN 9780922811441

Non-fiction

- The last laugh: form and affirmation in the contemporary American comic novel, University of Missouri Press, 1979, ISBN 9780826202741
- God be with the clown: humor in American poetry, University of Missouri Press, 1984, ISBN 9780826204226
- Henry James and the Comic Form. University of Michigan Press, 1975, ISBN 9780472089543
