= Norbert Gstrein =

Austrian writer (born 1961)

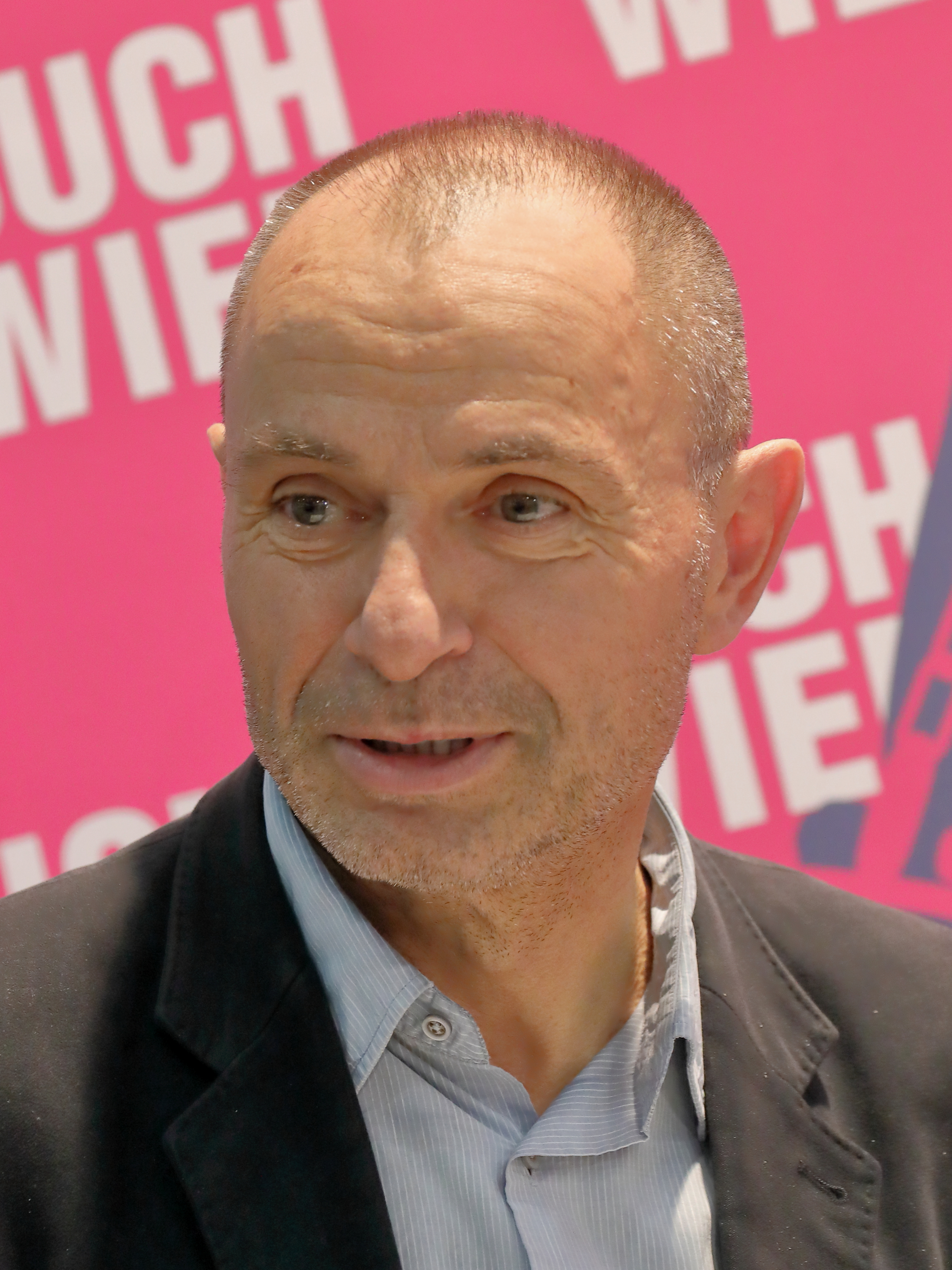
Norbert Gstrein, 2019

Norbert Gstrein (born 1961) is an Austrian writer. He was born in Mils in Tyrol, the son of the hotelier and ski school director Norbert Gstrein (1931–1988) and Maria Gstrein, née Thurner (born 1935). He grew up with his five siblings in Vent and attended the secondary school from 1971 to 1979 in Imst. From 1979 to 1984, Gstrein studied mathematics in Innsbruck, Stanford and Erlangen. He not completed his PhD (no defense of his thesis Zur Logik der Fragen) in 1988 at the University of Innsbruck, under the supervision of Roman Liedl and Gerhard Frey.

Gstrein is the author of more than a dozen books, including Winters in the South, translated into English by Anthea Bell and Julian Evans, and A Sense of the Beginning, translated by Julian Evans. Gstrein's novels have been translated into more than a dozen languages. His early books were all based in his native Tyrol. Among his numerous awards are the Alfred Döblin Prize and the Uwe Johnson Prize.

Gstrein lives as a freelance writer in Hamburg.

== Awards ==
- 1989 Rauris Literature Prize
- 1999 Alfred Döblin Prize
- 2001 Literaturpreis der Konrad-Adenauer-Stiftung
- 2003 Uwe Johnson Prize
- 2004 Franz Nabl Prize
- 2013 Anton Wildgans Prize
- 2021 Thomas Mann Prize
- 2026 Siegfried Lenz Prize

== Works ==
- Gstrein, Norbert (2022). Vier Tage, drei Nächte : Roman (in German). München. ISBN 978-3-446-27398-6. OCLC 1343601336.
- —— (2021). Der zweite Jakob : Roman (in German). München. ISBN 978-3-446-26916-3. OCLC 1240151427.
- —— (2010). Die ganze Wahrheit : Roman (in German). München: C. Hanser. ISBN 978-3-446-23549-6. OCLC 656350271.
- —— (2021). Die kommenden Jahre : Roman (in German). München: Piper Verlag. ISBN 978-3-492-31729-0. OCLC 1289759340.
- —— (2008). Die englischen Jahre Roman (in German). München. ISBN 978-3-446-23123-8. OCLC 276773473.
- —— (2019). Als ich jung war : Roman (in German). München. ISBN 978-3-446-26371-0. OCLC 1114255138.
- —— (2013). Eine Ahnung vom Anfang : Roman (in German). München. ISBN 978-3-446-24334-7. OCLC 854556011.
- ——; Kuhn, Heribert (2005). Einer : Erzählung (in German). Frankfurt am Main: Suhrkamp. ISBN 3-518-18861-5. OCLC 62553924.
- —— (2023). Mehr als nur ein Fremder (in German). München. ISBN 978-3-446-27665-9. OCLC 1348182304.
- —— (2010). Das Handwerk des Tötens Roman (in German). München. ISBN 978-3-423-13849-9. OCLC 503454492.
- —— (2011). In der Luft drei lange Erzählungen (in German). München. ISBN 978-3-446-23695-0. OCLC 711862818.
- —— (2016). In der freien Welt : Roman (in German). München. ISBN 978-3-446-25119-9. OCLC 936302511.
- —— (2000). Selbstportrait mit einer Toten (in German). Frankfurt am Main: Suhrkamp. ISBN 3-518-41123-3. OCLC 44493647.
- —— (2004). Wem gehört eine Geschichte? : Fakten, Fiktionen und ein Beweismittel gegen alle Wahrscheinlichkeit des wirklichen Lebens (in German). Frankfurt am Main: Suhrkamp. ISBN 3-518-41637-5. OCLC 56583390.
- —— (1993). O₂ : Novelle (in German). Frankfurt am Main: Suhrkamp. ISBN 3-518-40551-9. OCLC 29253808.
- —— (1992). Das Register: Roman (in German). Frankfurt am Main: Suhrkamp. ISBN 3-518-40478-4. OCLC 27054168.
- —— (1989). Anderntags : Erzählung (in German). Frankfurt am Main: Suhrkamp. ISBN 3-518-11625-8. OCLC 21139019.
- —— (1995). Der Kommerzialrat : Bericht (in German). Frankfurt am Main: Suhrkamp. ISBN 3-518-40712-0. OCLC 33257141.

=== English translations ===
- Gstrein, Norbert; Translation of: Gstrein, Norbert (2012). Winters in the south. London. ISBN 978-1-906694-30-2. OCLC 815497663.
- ——; Evans, Julian (2016). A sense of the beginning. London. ISBN 978-0-85705-358-9. OCLC 920726910.
- ——; Bangerter, Lowell A. (1995). The register. Riverside, CA: Ariadne Press. ISBN 1-57241-012-4. OCLC 31969062.
- —— (2002). The English years. London: Harvill. ISBN 1-86046-946-9. OCLC 48235557.

=== French translations ===
- Gstrein, Norbert; Le Lay, Olivier (2022). Quand j'étais jeune : roman (in French). Paris. ISBN 978-2-246-82586-9. OCLC 1317828424.
- ——; Boccon-Gibod, Isabelle; Impr. Firmin-Didot (1991). Un d'ici : roman (in French). [Paris]: Gallimard. ISBN 2-07-072228-7. OCLC 406539377.
- —— (2005). À qui appartient une histoire? : des faits, des fictions, ainsi qu'une preuve contre toute vraisemblance de la vie réelle (in French). Paris: Laurence Teper. ISBN 2-9520442-9-5. OCLC 77034448.
- ——; Kowalski, Colette (1994). Le Registre : roman (in French). [Paris]: Gallimard. ISBN 2-07-073208-8. OCLC 31423400.
- ——; Lortholary, Bernard (2002). Les années d'Angleterre (in French). Paris: Gallimard. ISBN 2-07-075812-5. OCLC 401623036.
- ——; Daran, Valérie de; Impr. Laballery (2005). Le métier de tuer (in French). Paris: L. Teper. ISBN 2-916010-00-9. OCLC 469332407.
- ——; Le Lay, Olivier (2016). Une vague idée du début : roman (in French). [Paris]: Gallimard. ISBN 978-2-07-014622-2. OCLC 946034634.

=== Spanish translations ===
- Gstrein, Norbert; Blanco, Rosa Pilar (2006). El oficio de matar (in Spanish). Barcelona: Tusquets Editores. ISBN 84-8310-341-9. OCLC 71820857.
- ——; Najmías, Daniel (2001). Los años ingleses (in Spanish). Barcelona: Tusquets Editores. ISBN 84-8310-184-X. OCLC 48637549.

=== Polish translations ===
- Gstrein, Norbert; Kalinowska, Elżbieta (2003). Angielskie lata (in Polish). Izabelin: Świat Literacki. ISBN 83-88612-60-3. OCLC 749587030.

=== Dutch translations ===
- Gstrein, Norbert; Snick, Els (2005). Een wrede zomer (in Dutch). Amsterdam: Cossee. ISBN 90-5936-052-4. OCLC 67007717.
- ——; Snick, Els (2006). De dag dat ze Jakob kwamen halen (in Dutch). Amsterdam: Cossee. ISBN 90-5936-133-4. OCLC 150276671.
