= Feldkircher Lyrikpreis =

Poetry award

The Feldkirch Poetry Prize, in German Feldkircher Lyrikpreis, was initiated by Erika Kronabitter, an Austrian artist and writer, and is awarded annually by the Theater am Saumarkt in Feldkirch, Vorarlberg/Austria. The sponsors include the Austrian government, the local authorities of Vorarlberg as well as private banks. In 2003, the poetry prize was awarded for the first time.

On an international basis, poets are invited to submit their German-language poems. The jury is composed by German philologists and poets. The awarded poets are presented to the public during autumn each year. The winners' texts are archived in the Library of Vorarlberg.

== Awarded Writers ==
=== 2025 ===
1. Lorena Pircher
2. Katrin Pitz
3. Audience Prize Ulrike Schrimpf

=== 2024 ===
1. Johanna Hansen
2. Hannah K Bründl ex aequo with Ozan Zakariya Keskinkilic
3. Audience Prize Stefan Feining

=== 2023 ===
1. Sabine Göttel
2. Slata Roschal
3. Audience Prize Ulrike Titelbach

=== 2022 ===
1. Ann Kathrin Ast
2. Philipp Hauser ex aequo with Armin Steigenberger
3. Audience Prize Sascha Kokot

=== 2021 ===
1. Sarah Rinderer
2. Martin Piekar
3. Elke Laznia

=== 2020 ===
1. Tobias Pagel
2. Simone Schabert
3. Monika Vasik

=== 2019 ===
1. Lars Arvid Brischke
2. Joseph Felix Ernst
3. Norbert Kröll

=== 2018 ===
1. David Fuchs
2. Bastian Schneider
3. Manuela Bibrach

=== 2017 ===
1. Thomas Amann
2. Johannes Tröndle ex aequo with Bernd Marcel Gonner

=== 2016 ===
1. Arnold Maxwill
2. Hartwig Mauritz

=== 2015 ===
1. Susanne Eules
2. Christoph Szalay

=== 2014 ===
1. Axel Görlach
2. Anja Kampmann
3. Ute Dietl

=== 2013 ===
1. Tabea Xenia Magyar and Tristan Marquardt (D)
2. Sibylla Vričić Hausmann (D)
3. Sandra Hubinger (A)
4. Special award: Martin Amanshauser (A)

=== 2012 ===
1. Elisabeth Steinkellner
2. Sascha Kokot and Andra Schwarz

=== 2011 ===
1. Tobias Falberg
2. C. H. Huber
3. Claudia Scherer

=== 2010 ===
1. Kenah Cusanit
2. Regina Hilber
3. Udo Kawasser

=== 2009 ===
1. Marcus Pöttler
2. Silke Peters and Thilo Krause (ex aequo)

=== 2008 ===
1. Andreas Neeser
2. Martin Strauß
3. Lina Hofstädter

=== 2007 ===
1. Klaus Händl
2. Bernhard Saupe
3. Alexandra Lavizzari
4. Thomas Steiner

=== 2006 ===
1. Adelheid Dahimène
2. Christine Haidegger
3. Ludwig Laher
4. Hans Eichhorn

=== 2005 ===
1. Knut Schaflinger
2. Julia Rhomberg
3. Udo Kawasser
4. Klaus Ebner

=== 2004 ===
1. Elsbeth Maag
2. Knut Schaflinger
3. Lisa Mayer
4. Gertrude Pieber-Prem
5. Sabine Eschgfäller
6. Udo Kawasser and Walter Pucher

=== 2003 ===
1. Elfriede Kehrer
2. Norbert Mayer
3. Walter Pucher
4. Mechthild Podzeit-Lütjen
5. Ulrike Ulrich

== Sources ==
- Austrian newspaper Vorarlberger Nachrichten
