= Uwe Johnson Prize =

German literary award

The Uwe Johnson Prize is an annual German literary award. The award is named after the writer Uwe Johnson (1934–1984) and was first awarded in 1994. It is awarded for "outstanding literary works in which there are links to the poetics of Uwe Johnson". Alternating the main prize for a work and the Förderpreis (promotional prize) for the best debut is awarded by the Mecklenburg Literature Society, the Nordkurier (1994–2016), the Berlin law firm Gentz und Partner (since 2012) and the Humanistischer Verband Deutschlands (since 2017). The prize is endowed with €20,000 (Förderpreis: €5,000).

== Recipients ==
- 1994: Kurt Drawert Spiegelland. Ein deutscher Monolog
- 1995: Walter Kempowski for Das Echolot
- 1997: Marcel Beyer for Flughunde
- 1999: Gert Neumann for Anschlag
- 2001: Jürgen Becker for Aus der Geschichte der Trennungen
- 2003: Norbert Gstrein for Das Handwerk des Tötens
- 2005: Arno Orzessek for Schattauers Tochter (Förderpreis)
- 2006: Joochen Laabs for Späte Reise
- 2007: Emma Braslavsky for Aus dem Sinn (Förderpreis)
- 2008: Uwe Tellkamp for Der Turm
- 2009: Thomas Pletzinger for Bestattung eines Hundes (Förderpreis)
- 2010: Christa Wolf for Stadt der Engel
- 2011: Judith Zander for Dinge, die wir heute sagten (Förderpreis)
- 2012: Christoph Hein for Weiskerns Nachlass
- 2013: Matthias Senkel for Frühe Vögel (Förderpreis)
- 2014: Lutz Seiler for Kruso
- 2015: Mirna Funk for Winternähe (Förderpreis)
- 2016: Jan Koneffke for Ein Sonntagskind
- 2017: Shida Bazyar for Nachts ist es leise in Teheran (Förderpreis)
- 2018: Ralf Rothmann for Der Gott jenes Sommers
- 2019: Kenah Cusanit for Babel (Förderpreis)
- 2020: Irina Liebmann for Die Große Hamburger Straße
- 2021: Benjamin Quaderer for Für immer die Alpen (Förderpreis)
- 2022: Jenny Erpenbeck for Kairos
- 2023: Domenico Müllensiefen for Aus unseren Feuern (Förderpreis)
- 2024: Iris Wolff for Lichtungen
- 2025: Kurt Tallert for Spur und Abweg (Förderpreis)
- 2026: Ingo Schulze for Das Wasser im August
