= Kenah Cusanit =

German writer

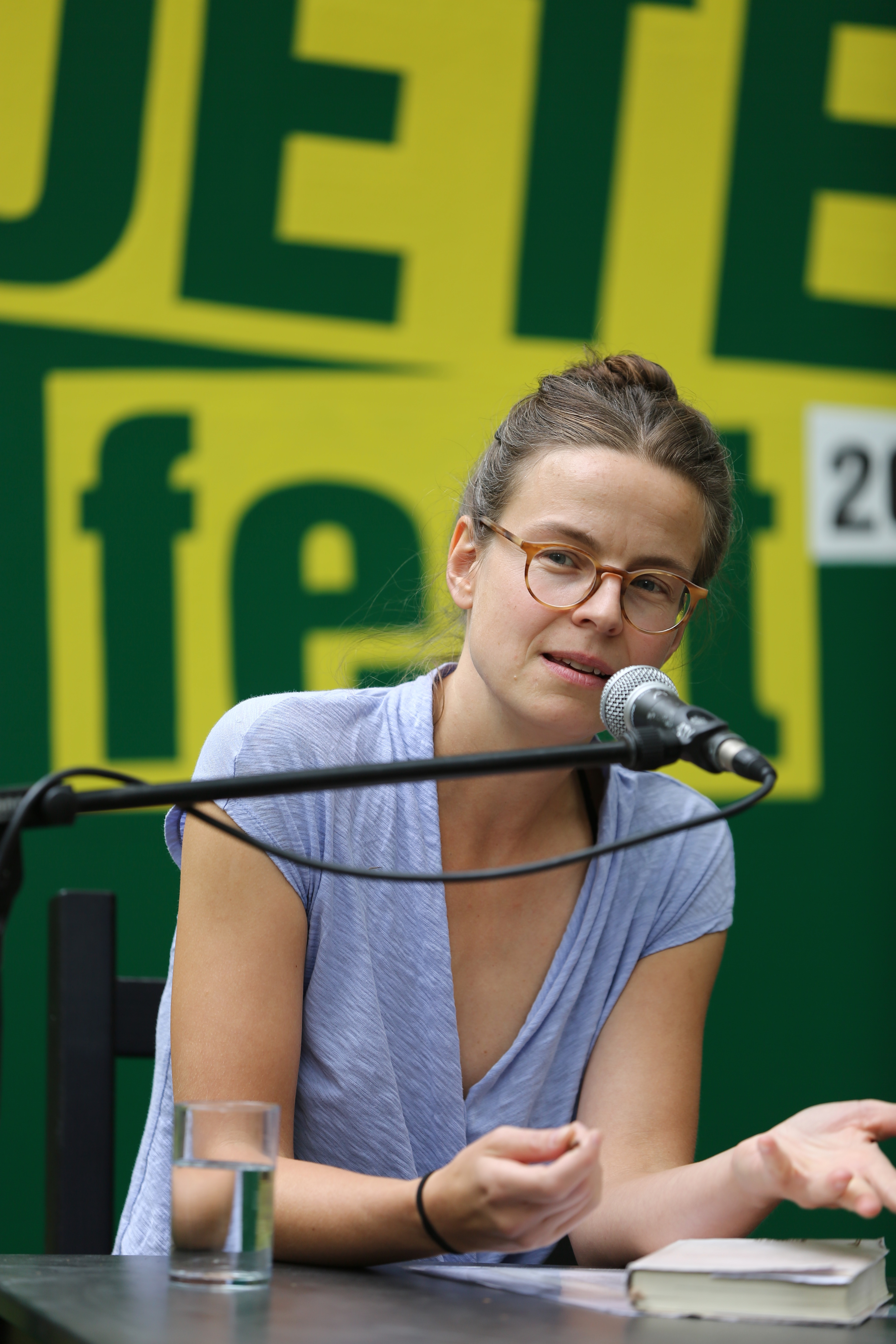
Kenah Cusanit at the Erlanger Poetenfest 2019

Kenah Cusanit (born 1979 in Blankenburg (Harz), Germany) is a German writer.

== Life and work ==
Kenah Cusanit grew up in Berlin-Brandenburg. Initially, she studied archeology and, later on, Ancient Near East studies, ethnology and African studies. She graduated as a Master of Arts. Subsequently, besides writing prose and poetry, Cusanit worked as a journalist in Germany and abroad. Cusanit's work has been published in numerous literary magazines like Edit, Ostragehege, poet, Sprache im technischen Zeitalter and manuskripte as well as regularly in anthologies like the Jahrbuch der Lyrik (Yearbook of Poetry).

In 2019, Cusanit published her debut novel Babel which was granted the promotional prize of the Uwe-Johnson-Förderpreis in the same year and gained her much attention ever since.

== Publications ==
- aus Papier. Gedichte, hochroth Verlag, Berlin 2014, ISBN 978-3-902871-52-7.
- Chronographe Chorologien I. Gedichte, hochroth Verlag, Berlin 2017, ISBN 978-3-902871-93-0.
- Babel. Roman, Hanser Verlag, München 2019, ISBN 978-3-446261-65-5.
- Senatore Cappelli. Essay. Matthes & Seitz Berlin, Berlin 2025, ISBN 978-3-7518-4028-6.

== Awards (selection) ==
- 2009 Scholarship of the State of Brandenburg
- 2010 Feldkircher Lyrikpreis
- 2011 Scholarship of the prose workshop of the Literarisches Colloquium Berlin
- 2012 Residency of the Art Foundation Donnersbergkreis
- 2012 Scholarship of the arts foundation of the Free State of Saxony
- 2012 Update Prize of the Bavarian Literature Foundation
- 2014 Bayerischer Kunstförderpreis
- 2016 Nominated for the Merano Poetry Prize
- 2017 Scholarship of the Senate of Berlin
- 2018 Scholarship of the Preußische Seehandlung Berlin Foundation
- 2019 Nominated for the Leipzig Book Fair Prize for Babel
- 2019 Promotional prize of the Uwe-Johnson-Förderpreis for Babel
- 2019 Scholarship of the Senate of Berlin
- 2021/22 Rome Prize of the German Academy Rome Villa Massimo
- 2024 German Prize for Nature Writing for Senatore Cappelli
