= Slata Roschal =

German woman writer

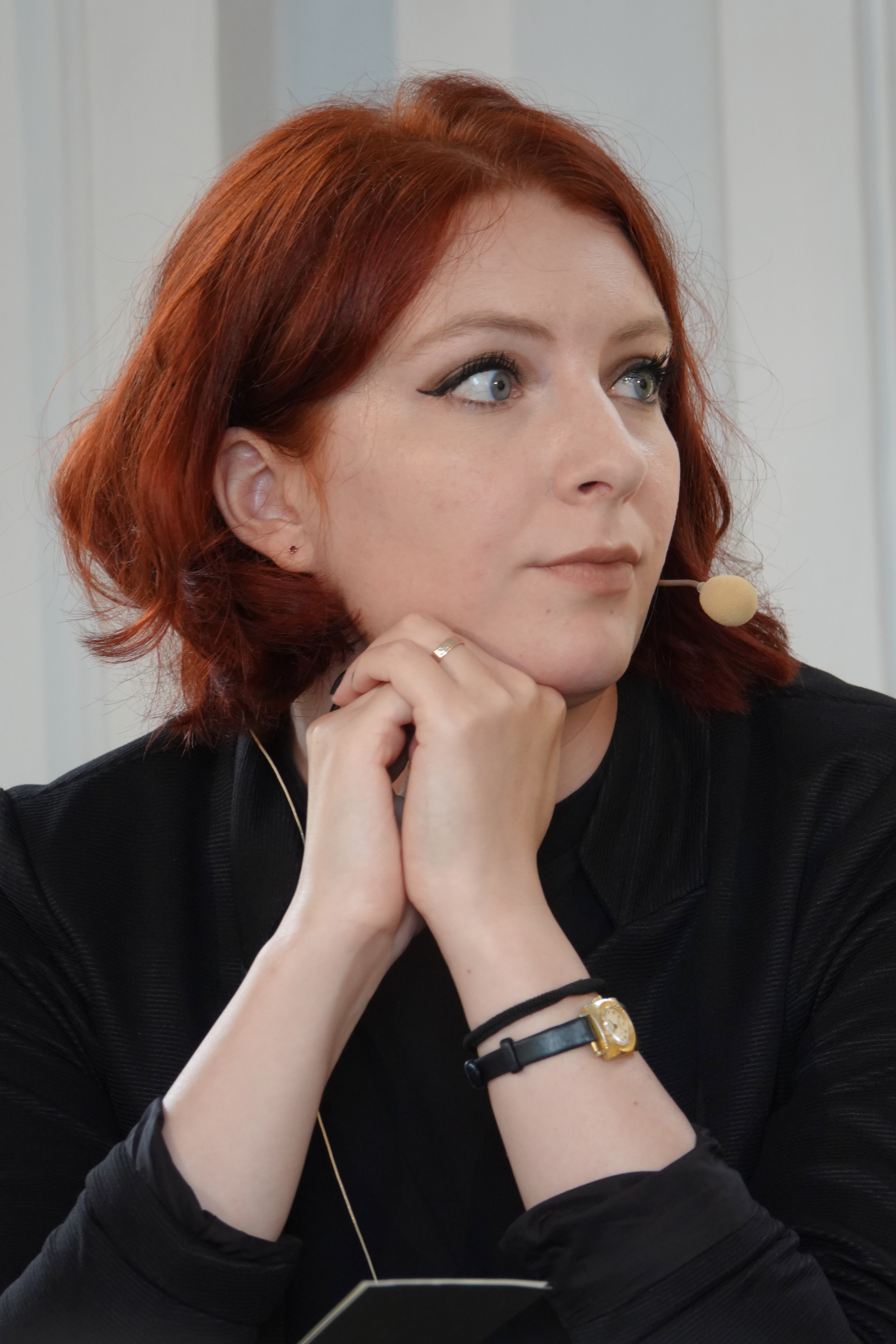
Slata Roschal at the Erlanger Poetenfest 2022

Slata Roschal (born 1992 in Saint Petersburg, Russia), also known as Slata Kozakova, is a German writer and literary scholar.

== Early life and education ==
In 1997, Roschal moved with her parents to Schwerin in Germany where she was raised bilingual. After graduating from secondary school, she studied Slavic studies, German studies and comparative literature studies at the University of Greifswald. She graduated with a doctor's degree at LMU Munich in 2021.

== Career ==
In 2017, Roschal published a poetry and prose anthology on contemporary literature from the Baltic Sea region in collaboration with Matthias Friedrich. She has published poetry, prose and translations from Russian in numerous anthologies and literary magazines. In 2018, she was awarded the Mecklenburg-Western Pomerania Literature Prize. In 2019, she published her debut poetry collection, Wir verzichten auf das gelobte Land (We renounce the promised land) followed by the poetry and prose miniature collection Wir tauschen Ansichten und Ängste wie weiche warme Tiere aus (We exchange views and fears like soft, warm animals) in 2021 which gained much attention.

In February 2022, Roschal published her debut novel 153 Formen des Nichtseins (153 forms of not-being). Originally published by the Erlangen based independent press Homunculus Verlag, the novel was received well by critics and turned out to be a success. In 2022, it was nominated the SWR-Bestenliste and for the German Book Prize and won numerous awards. In 2024, the novel was published as a paperback with the German Penguin Verlag.

In February 2024, Roschal published her second novel Ich möchte Wein trinken und auf das Ende der Welt warten (I want to drink wine and wait for the end of the world) which again has been very well received by critics.

== Critical reception ==
Roschal's poetry collection Wir tauschen Ansichten und Ängste wie weiche warme Tiere aus (We exchange views and fears like soft, warm animals) has received a recommendation by Marie Luise Knott in the context of the poetry recommendations of the Deutsche Akademie für Sprache und Dichtung, the foundation Lyrik Kabinett Munich and the Haus für Poesie (House for Poetry) Berlin in 2022. Also, it was amongst the 10 best Bavarian independent books in 2022.

Max Fluder calls Roschal's language "dangerously good (gefährlich gute Sprache") and Lena Gorelik states that Roschal's debut novel "impressed her tremendously (hat mich unheimlich beeindruckt").

For Antje Weber, 153 Formen des Nichtseins (153 forms of not-being) is "the impressive testimony of an ideational realisation, an ardous self-empowerment (... das beeindruckende Zeugnis einer Bewusstwerdung, einer mühsamen Selbstermächtigung ..."), a book that "delivers insight into the reflections and conflicting emotions that are part of such a process. (... gibt Einblick in die Reflexionen und widersprüchlichen Gefühle, die zu einem solchen Prozess dazugehören.")

In her review of Ich möchte Wein trinken und auf das Ende der Welt warten (I want to drink wine and wait for the end of the world), Miriam Zeh comes to the conclusion that "you want to read Slata Roschal, reread her – and wait for the end of the world. (Slata Roschal möchte man lesen, wiederlesen – und auf das Ende der Welt warten.").

Michael Schleicher of the Münchner Merkur considers this very novel of Roschal to be "a highlight of the still young spring book season (Höhepunkt des noch jungen Bücher-Frühjahrs)" summing up that her "book is an extraordinary achievement with a subtle tone (... Buch ist ein großer Wurf mit leisen Tönen)."

== Personal life ==
Roschal lives in Munich.

== Publications ==
=== Independent publications ===
- Über Unkraut diskutieren. Fünf Erzählungen. Rostock 2017.
- Wir verzichten auf das gelobte Land. Gedichte. Reinecke & Voß, Leipzig 2019, ISBN 978-3-942901-36-9.
- Wir tauschen Ansichten und Ängste wie weiche warme Tiere aus. Gedichte und Prosaminiaturen, hochroth Verlag. München 2021, ISBN 978-3-903182-81-3.
- 153 Formen des Nichtseins. Roman. Homunculus Verlag, Erlangen 2022, ISBN 978-3-946120-94-0. (2024 als Taschenbuch im Penguin Verlag. ISBN 978-3-328-11096-5.)
- Ich möchte Wein trinken und auf das Ende der Welt warten. Roman. Claassen-Verlag, Berlin 2024, ISBN 978-3-546-10076-2.

=== Editorial work ===
- Under the name Slata Kozakova and in collaboration with Matthias Friedrich: Einbildung eines eleganten Schiffbruchs. Gedichte aus dem Ostseeraum. Reinecke & Voß, Leipzig 2017, ISBN 978-3-942901-24-6.
- Under the name Slata Kozakova in collaboration with Matthias Friedrich: Weniger eine Leiche als vielmehr eine Figur. Erzählungen aus dem Ostseeraum. Reinecke & Voß, Leipzig 2017, ISBN 978-3-942901-26-0.

=== Scientific publications ===
- Tote und lebende Mütter in "Die Brüder Karamasow". In: Goes, Gudrun (Hrsg.): Recht und Gerechtigkeit bei Fjodor Dostojewskij (24. Jahrbuch der Deutschen Dostojewskij-Gesellschaft 2017). Berlin 2018, 127–146.
- Der unbegreifliche Tod in F. M. Dostojewskijs "phantastischer" Erzählung "Die Sanfte" (Krotkaja, 1876). In: Garstka, Christoph (Hrsg.): Alltag in Dostojewskijs Russland (25. Jahrbuch der Deutschen Dostojewskij Gesellschaft 2018). Berlin 2019, 97–112.
- Ein guter Zuhörer. Erzähler und Erzählebenen in Lev N. Tolstojs „Krejcerova sonata“. In: Bauer, Iris / Drosihn, Yvonne / Kowollik, Eva et al. (Hrsg.): Close Reading – Distant Reading: Spannungsfelder der slavistischen Literatur- und Kulturwissenschaften (Reflexionen des Gesellschaftichen in Sprache und Literatur, Hallesche Beiträge, Bd. 9). Halle 2021, S. 49–64.
- Die weibliche Leiche bei Dostoevskij. In: Knežević, Jelena / Goes, Gudrun / Meyer-Fraatz, Andrea (Hrsg.): Sonderband Folia Linguistica et Litteraria (38), Nikšić 2021, 205–217.
- Under the name Slata Kozakova: Der Mann im Untergrund. Zu einem Männlichkeitstypus in der russischen Literatur der zweiten Hälfte des 19. Jahrhunderts. Vandenhoeck & Ruprecht, Göttingen 2022, ISBN 978-3-666-36769-4.

== Awards (selection) ==
- 2018 Prize of the jury and audience award at the Mecklenburg–Western Pomerania Literature Prize
- 2020 Scholarship of the Free State of Bavaria
- 2020 Project grant of the foundation Zurückgeben (Giving back) for the financial support of Jewish women for the realization of their artistic or scientific projects
- 2022 Longlist of the German Book Prize for 153 Formen des Nichtseins (153 forms of not-being)
- 2022 Bavarian Award for the Advancement of the Arts for 153 Formen des Nichtseins (153 forms of not-being)
- 2023 Advancement award of the Schubart Literature Prize of the city of Aalen
- 2023 Christine Literature Prize of the BücherFrauen
- 2023 Second prize at the Feldkirch Lrikpreis
- 2023 Margraviate of Brandenburg Literature Scholarship (Roschal voluntarily split the award with her competitors Fatma Aydemir and Nastasja Penzar)
- 2023 Writer in Residence at the Faculty of Philological and Cultural Studies of the University of Innsbruck
- 2023/24 Scholarship of the Deutscher Literaturfonds
- 2023/24 Writer in Residence at the University of Nancy in France
- 2024 Shortlist of the Munich Poetry Prize
