= Wolfgang Kauer =

Austrian author (born 1957)

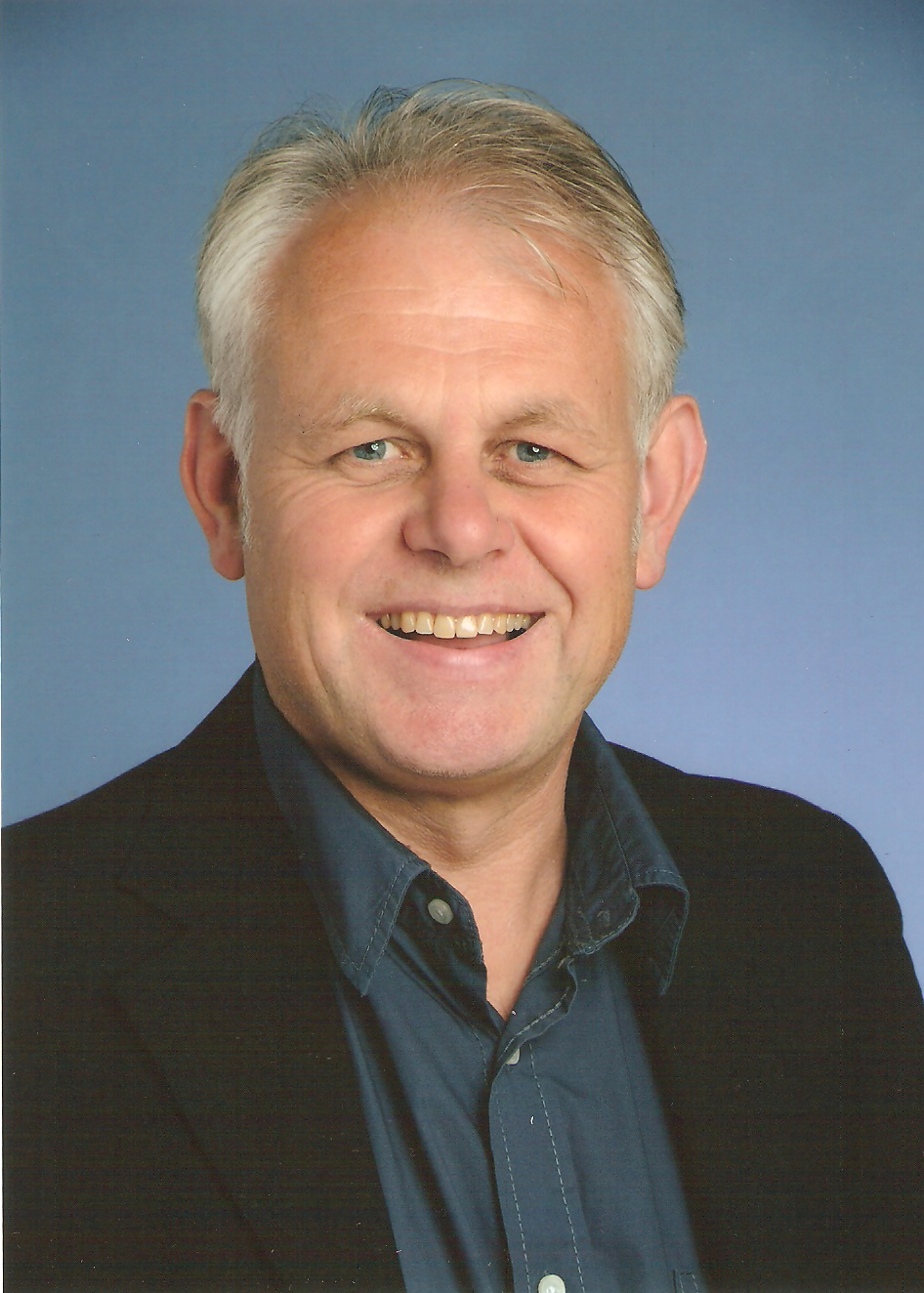
Portrait of Wolfgang Kauer

Wolfgang Kauer (born 20 February 1957) is an Austrian author who lives in Salzburg. He writes novels, short stories, audio plays, and poems in German.

== Life ==
Wolfgang Kauer was born in Linz, where he attended Adalbert-Stifter-Gymnasium until his graduation in 1975. He did his undergraduate studies in German Philology, Geography, and Arts at the University of Art and Industrial Design in Linz and the Mozarteum in Salzburg.

In 1999, after working as a free-licensed journalist and teacher in Linz, Kauer moved to Salzburg. He teaches at a grammar school there, the Humanistisches Gymnasium. Kauer is also a professor of German Literature and Philology at the Linz Private Art University and works as a freelance writer. He writes lyric poetry, prose, short stories, novels, and audio plays.

In 2010, as part of an annual writers' competition held by the Salzburger Autorengruppe, Julian Schutting, a world-famous Viennese author, recognized Kauer as the best author in Salzburg. Schutting especially accentuated Kauer's research concerning contemporary history. Kauer was also given other prizes by the authors Sabine Gruber of Meran, Italy and Bettina Balàka of Vienna. The linguist Dr. Eberhard Riedel, of Klagenfurt University, compares Kauer's style to the literature of the renowned German author Jean Paul Richter. Professor Dr. Karl Müller of the Institute of German Philology at Salzburg University, associates music with the author's poetry, while Professor Dr. Erwin Streitfeld of the Institute of German Philology at Graz University, prefers landscapes in Kauer's prose. Dr. Brita Steinwendtner, former leader of a famous literature competition held in Rausis, appreciates the historical dimension in Kauer's texts. Wolfgang Kauer received the Salzburg Scholarship of Literature in 2013.

Kauer shows special interest in archeology, especially in the ancient Celtic beak flagon of Salzburg, the Dürrnberger Schnabelkanne, which can be seen in the Celtic Museum of Hallein. Kauer wrote three novels focusing on this cultic object.

== Works of Fiction ==
- Der Linzer Golem, Prosa, in: Facetten, Literaturzeitschrift der Stadt Linz, Linz 1992, p. 85–91, ISBN 3-85214-573-2
- Stelzhamer, Prosa in: Meridiane. Literatur aus Oberösterreich. Bibliothek der Provinz: Weitra (no year given), p. 80–81, ISBN 3-85252 082 7
- Der Bär und das Inselmädchen, Prosa, in: Facetten, Literaturzeitschrift der Stadt Linz, Linz 1991, p. 126–128, ISBN 3-85214-561-9
- Lyrik bewerten, Essay in: Die Zeit im Buch 3/93, Österr. Bischofskonferenz: Wien 1993, p. 99–101
- Strindbergphantasien Mondseer Ausgewanderter, prose, in: Die Rampe, Linz 1994/2, p. 21–41, ISBN 3-85320 679 4
- Über Franz Josef Heinrichs Stifter-Text und darüber hinaus, essay, in: Die Rampe, Sonderheft Franz Josef Heinrich, Linz 1995, p. 55–56 ISBN 3-85320 869 X
- Minnesangs Ende, prose, in: Die Rampe, Linz 1996/2, p. 99–106, ISBN 3-85320 772-3
- Papa auf Abwegen, youth play, premiered March 31, 2001 at the Mozartplatz Salzburg (cf. newspaper Salzburger Nachrichten of May 31, 2001)
- Grenzüberschreitungen, Prose, in: Facetten, Linz 2001, p. 149-159, ISBN 3-85252-4032
- Herzog Tassilo, youth play, premiered May 20, 2004 in the Salzburgian Gymnasium der Herz-Jesu-Missionare in Liefering (cf. newspaper Salzburger Nachrichten of May 20, 2004)
- Klagelied freier Autoren, lyrics, in: Wie es eben so ist, ohne Harfe. Eine Lyrikanthologie, edited by the Salzburger Autorengruppe, Edition Eizenbergerhof: Salzburg 2005, p. 65–73, ISBN 3-901243-26-7
- Lange Abwesenheit. Gedanken zu Tessa Rumsey., Gedicht, in: Wörterspuren. Gedichte, Wortstämme Literaturproduktionen. Linz 2009, S.8
- Meer-Blick, 3 poems, in: Querfeldein 01. Das Literaturheft des Linzer Frühlings, Linzer Frühling: Linz 2010, p. 85–87, ISBN 978-3-9519904-0-8
- Die untere Gnigl. Fallstudie der Siedlungsgenese auf dem Alterbachschwemmkegel, in: Gnigl. Salzburger Stadtteil, ed. by Sabine Veits-Falk and Thomas Weidenholzer, Salzburg 2010, p. 294–307, Schriftenreihe des Archivs der Stadt Salzburg 29, ISBN 978-3-900213-13-8
- der geisterfahrer. ein filmisches epos. In: Aroqart Nr.1. Zeitschrift für Film, Bild, Text, Musik. Hrsg. v. Paul Jaeg. Arovell: Gosau 2012, S. 17 ff
- Der japanische Stifter. In: Europa erlesen: Donau. Hrsg v. Christian Fridrich und Lojze Wieser. Wieser-Verlag: Klagenfurt/Celovec 2012, S. 153 ISBN 978-3-99029-014-9
- 1934: Abendgebet nach der Erstkommunion. In: Mosaik. Zeitschrift für Literatur und Kultur für Studenten. Salzburg Juni 2013, Heft 7, S. 4 ff
- Er-Oberungen. In: Mosaik. Zeitschrift für Literatur und Kultur für Studenten. Salzburg Nov. 2013, Heft 8, S. 13
- Vorstadt-Hybris. In: Mosaik. Zeitschrift für Literatur und Kultur für Studenten. Salzburg Jan. 2014, Heft 9, S. 10
- Lied von der jungen Stoffverkäuferin in der Getreidegasse. In: Mosaik. Zeitschrift für Literatur und Kultur für Studenten. Salzburg Herbst 2014, Heft 12, S. 9

== Books ==
- Die Donau hinauf, Maskenprosa, Verlag LinzKulturTexte, Linz 1996, ISBN 3-85214-666-6
- Nachtseite, Satiren und Kurzgeschichten, Arovell Verlag, Salzburg/Gosau/Wien 2007, ISBN 978-3-902547-48-4
- Azur-Fenster, Erzählungen und Lyrik mit Meerblick, Arovell Verlag, Salzburg/Gosau/Wien 2008, ISBN 978-3-902547-64-4
- Magenta Verde, Prosa, Lyrik, Aphorismen, Arovell Verlag, Salzburg/Gosau/Wien 2009, ISBN 978-3-902547-73-6
- Funken regen, (Zeit-)geschichtliche Prosa und filmisches Epos. Arovell Verlag, Salzburg/Gosau/Wien 2010, ISBN 978-3-902547-08-8
- Geheimnisvoll gewinnbringend, Satiren und Erzählungen betreff Alpenvorland. Arovell Verlag, Salzburg/Gosau/Wien 2012, ISBN 978-3-902808-13-4
- Der Code der Schnabelkanne oder Das Keltenfieber, Ikonografischer Roman über die Schnabelkanne vom Halleiner Dürrnberg. Edition Innsalz, Ranshofen 2012, Bd.1 der Schnabelkannen-Romantrilogie ISBN 978-3-902616-57-9
- Frau Perchta und die Schnabelkanne, Ikonografischer Roman (eine erste Chronologie des Mythos über die gastrotomische Sagenfigur Frau Percht/Frau Holle/Isis Noreia/Hekate und die Schwarzen Frauen/ Madonnen sowie der thematische Zusammenhang mit der keltischen Schnabelkanne vom Halleiner Dürrnberg). Edition Innsalz, Ranshofen 2013, Bd.2 der Schnabelkannen-Romantrilogie, ISBN 978-3-902616-85-2
- Frau Venus auf Wanderschaft. Die Erdmutter in alpinen Felsritzbildern, Ikonografischer Roman. Edition Innsalz, Ranshofen 2015, Bd.3 der mehr als 1100 Seiten umfassenden Schnabelkannen-Romantrilogie, ISBN 978-3-902981-52-3
- Ausgewählte Gedichte, Hrsg. v. Hannes Vyoral anlässlich des 60. Geburtstags des Authors, mit e. Vorwort von Maria Herlo, Heidelberg. Podium, Wien Feb. 2017,ISBN 978-3-902886-33-0
- Felsbilder der Ostalpen. Das Erbe der Mondfrau, Blog-Roman mit ca. 170 Abbildungen in Farbe. Verlag Anton Pustet: Salzburg September 2017. ISBN 978-3-7025-8045-2
