= Nika Pfeifer =

Austrian writer and transmedia artist

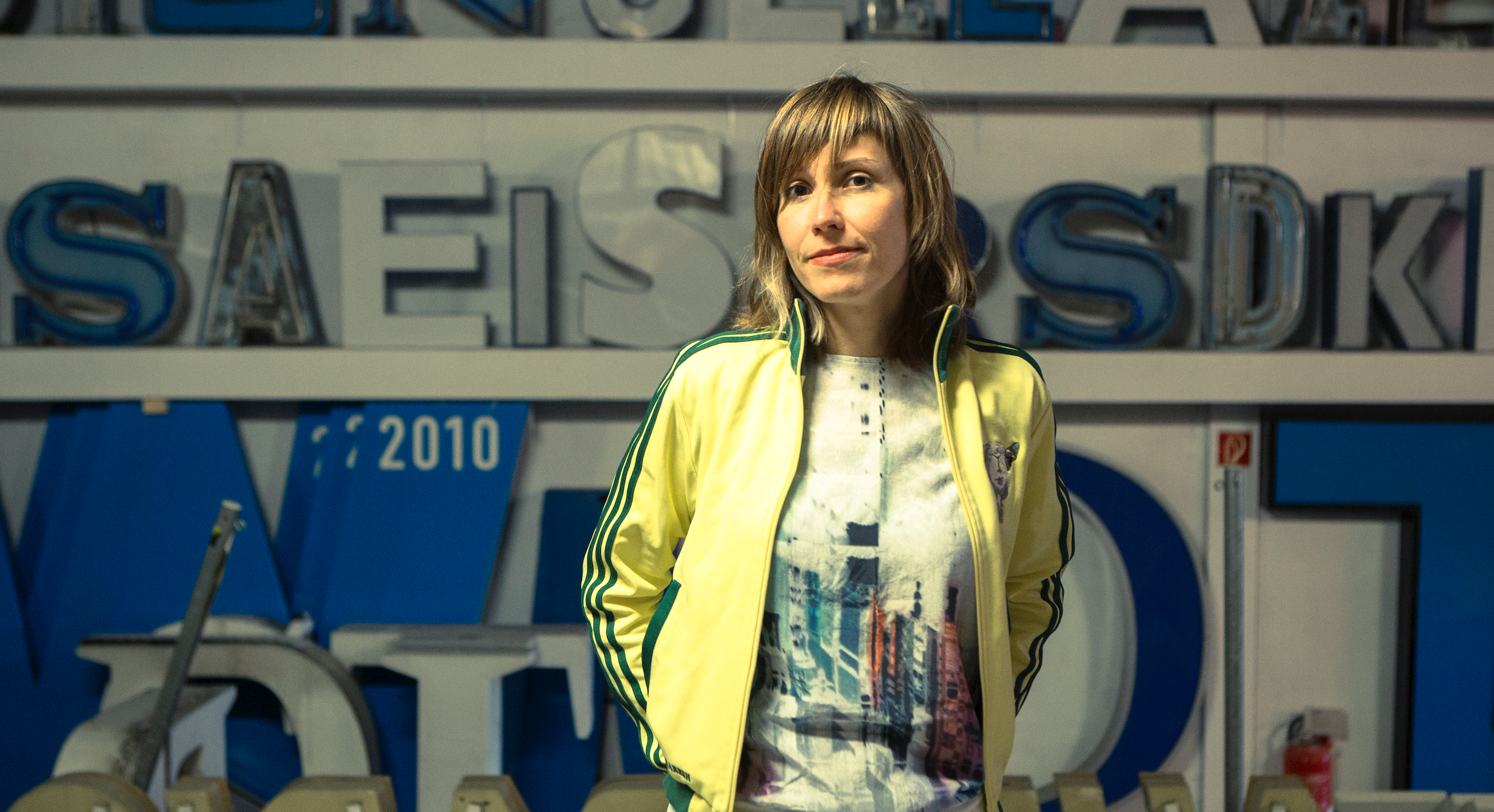
- Nika Pfeifer (Foto: Lukas Dostal, CC BY-SA 4.0)
- Born: Judith Nika Pfeifer
- Occupations: Writer, poet, transmedia artist
- Writing career
- Notable works: Violante, TUCSONICS, TIGER TOAST
- Website: nikapfeifer.com

Nika Pfeifer, also known as Judith Nika Pfeifer, is an Austrian writer, poet, and transmedia artist. Her work combines literary writing with sound- and media-based forms and has been reviewed in German-language cultural media including Deutschlandfunk, Die Presse, and Falter. She lives and works between Vienna and Brussels.

== Education ==
Pfeifer studied Political Science and Communication at the University of Vienna and the University of Pavia. She earned a PhD through interdisciplinary research conducted at the University of Vienna and Lancaster University. In addition, she attended courses in language arts at the University of Applied Arts Vienna and at the Vienna Poetry School.

== Career and works ==
Pfeifer has published several poetry collections, including nichts ist wichtiger. ding kleines du (2012), manchmal passiert auch minutenlang gar nichts (2015), TUCSONICS (2019; English-language edition 2022), and TIGER TOAST (2024). She is also the author of the short story collection zwischen.Prosa (2015) and the novel Violante (2017).

Her writing has appeared in literary journals and anthologies, including kolik and the Jahrbuch der Lyrik, published by Schöffling & Co. She has also worked in collaborative formats, co-authoring the radio play BABY, BABY! Luftpost für Janis together with Milena Kipfmüller, Klaus Janek, and Ruth Johanna Benrath. The production was nominated for the Ö1 radio drama audience award.

== Audio and video projects ==
In addition to her literary work, Pfeifer has developed audio- and video-based projects situated between poetry, sound art, and performance. She has collaborated on radio plays and performances, including Drahtseilakt and BABY, BABY! LUFTPOST FÜR JANIS. BABY, BABY! LUFTPOST FÜR JANIS was listed among the nominated productions for the ORF/Ö1 radio drama audience award. One of Pfeifer’s short films, Keep on Dreaming No. 3 (2022), was presented as part of the PRESTO short film programme during the Gastland Österreich–featured events at the Leipzig Book Fair in April 2023, where she appeared in discussion with writer Hanno Millesi and curator Thomas Ballhausen.

Her audio and video projects have also included short films and installations presented in literary and artistic contexts. Selected projects include the audio installation duda (2015), created for Artists & Poets / Dial-a-Poem at Secession Wien, and a video collage produced in 2022 in commemoration of poet Christian Ide Hintze, which was presented at Metro Kino Vienna.

== Reception ==
Pfeifer’s work has been the subject of critical discussion in German-language cultural media. In a review for Deutschlandfunk, critic Michaela Schmitz discussed Pfeifer’s poetry in terms of its rhythmic and performative qualities, describing it as combining spoken-word elements with musical and meditative structures. Her early poetry collection nichts ist wichtiger. ding kleines du was also reviewed by Literaturhaus Wien, which highlighted its minimalist language and experimental approach to poetic form.

The novel Violante was reviewed in Falter, where it was discussed with regard to its formal construction and its engagement with political and personal themes.

It was also reviewed in Die Presse, where critic Johanna Öttl discussed Pfeifer’s narrative approach to historical material, highlighting the work’s use of multiple voices, genre shifts, and montage techniques to explore questions of biography, power, and post-factual discourse.

Pfeifer has held guest teaching and research positions internationally, including as a Max Kade Fellow at Georgetown University and at the University of Arizona. She has also participated in international residency and teaching programs supported by cultural institutions such as the Goethe-Institut, including at the Srishti Institute of Art, Design and Technology in Bangalore, India.

== Awards and distinctions ==
Pfeifer received the Reinhard-Priessnitz-Preis in 2012. As a co-author, she was awarded the Bruno Kreisky Recognition Award for Political Writing in 2002. She was also a finalist for the Werner Bräunig Prize (2010).

== Selected works ==
- manchmal passiert auch minutenlang gar nichts (2015, Berger), ISBN 978-3-85028-684-8
- Violante (2017, Czernin), ISBN 978-3-7076-0601-0
- TUCSONICS (2019; English-language edition 2022, hochroth), ISBN 978-3-903182-41-7
- TIGER TOAST (2024, Ritter), ISBN 978-3-85415-679-6
