= Seifried Helbling =

Austrian poet

Seifried Helbling (b. 1230) was an Austrian poet.

Helbling is the supposed author of 15 small books of poetry. These poems, composed between 1282 and 1300, are instructional satires written in the form of a dialogue between the poet and his servant. They thoroughly and wittily describe the current state of life and the social mores in the poet's time. Also included are poems of a religious nature, some honoring the Virgin Mary. Helbling's authorship of these 15 books is still in question.

Helbling was also the proprietor of an arboretum in Nußdorf, a suburb of Vienna.
