= Vladimir Vertlib =

Austrian author (born 1966)

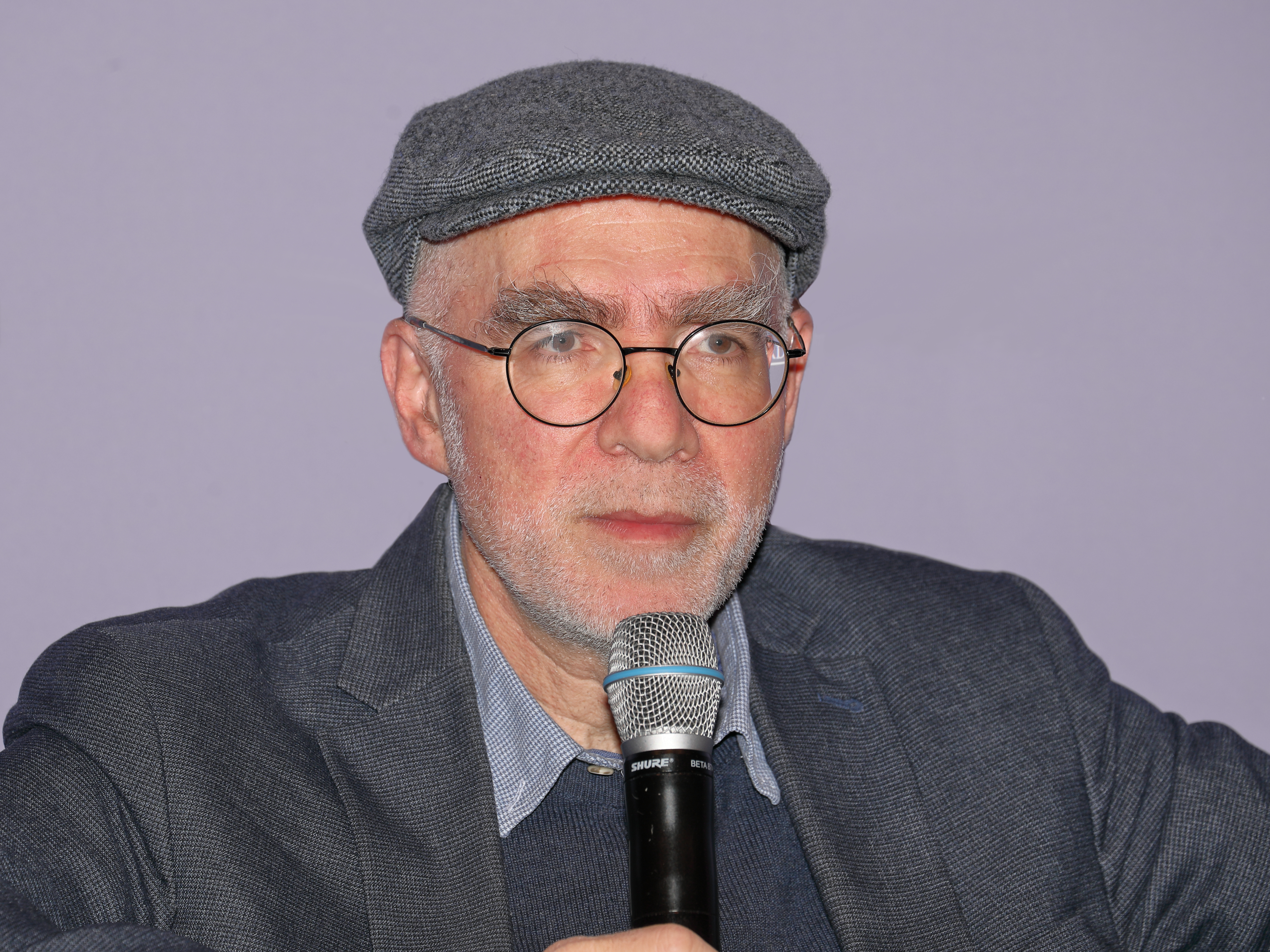
Vladimir Vertlib

Vladimir Vertlib, born 2 July 1966 in Leningrad, Russia, immigrated to Austria where he became a writer. His works, revolving around the themes of migration, Judaism, and identity, have been translated to Russian, Czech, Slovenian, and Italian.

== Life ==
Vladimir Vertlib was born on 2 July 1966 in Leningrad, USSR (now St. Petersburg, Russia). In 1971, at age 5, Vladimir Vertlib immigrated with his parents to Israel. The family’s migration odyssey continued with a move to Austria in 1972, followed by a passing stay in Italy before returning to Austria. In 1975, the family relocated briefly to the Netherlands and then to Israel, and in 1976 – after a sojourn in Rome – they returned to Vienna. In 1980, Vertlib and his parents immigrated to the United States of America; however, detention followed by deportation from the US in 1981 led to the family ultimately settling in Vienna. Vladimir Vertlib became an Austrian citizen in 1986.

Vertlib studied economics at the University of Vienna from 1984–89, and subsequently found employment as a freelancer for the Japanese press agency "Kyodo News Service." He also worked as a statistician at the Donau Versicherungs AG, and as an analyst at the Österreichische Kontrollbank AG. In 1990, as an alternative to compulsory military service in Austria, he completed his civilian service in a geriatric day care centre. Since 1993, he has been working as a freelance writer, social scientist, and translator in Salzburg and Vienna.

== Literary career ==
His first two novels, Abschiebung (1995) and Zwischenstationen (1999) both deal with the partly autobiographical experience of exile, telling the stories of families who are migrating from the Soviet Union to other countries. Similar to Vertlib`s trail of immigrations, in Zwischenstationen the family moves from Israel to Italy, followed by moves to Austria, the Netherlands, and the US, before finally settling in Vienna. Told from the perspective of a child, the novel reflects Vertlib's personal experience with migration: at home in Austria, but not Austrian-born, he based the story on his own feelings as a migrant child. Vertlib`s novel Schimons Schweigen (2012) was the final episode of the unofficial trilogy revolving around migrant identity and coming to terms with his own odyssey. The protagonist, an Austrian author, travels to Israel, intending to solve the mystery of why his father and his father`s friend Schimon ceased to communicate with each other for 30 years. The novel discusses the issue of displacement and the compromised identity experienced by the protagonist when outside of his homeland as a result of travels between Israel and the Soviet Union.

Vertlib's Das besondere Gedächtnis der Rosa Masur (2001) tells the life story of a 92-year-old Jewish woman who migrated from Leningrad to Germany, and in doing so, covers Russia`s 20th century history: anti-Semitism, communism and war. Similarly, the anthology Mein erster Mörder. Lebensgeschichten. (2006) contains life stories and depicts the course of the 20th century. In this instance, the characters featured through three life stories are displaced persons struggling to survive the catastrophes of the century. In Am Morgen des zwölften Tages (2009), the love story of a German woman and a Muslim man depicts the complicated relationship between Orient and Occident, and between Christianity, Judaism, and Islam.

Vertlib`s most recent novel, Lucia Binar und die russische Seele (2015), features an 83-year-old woman and a young student who embark on an exceptional journey through Vienna, attempting to locate a call centre employee. Over the course of their journey, they meet several colorful people, experiencing bizarre phenomena of the Austrian society as well as learning about problematic social and political conditions in Russia.

In 1995, he became a member of the editorial board of the Viennese literary journal Mit der Ziehharmonika, which became the Zwischenwelt – Zeitschrift für Literatur des Exils und des Widerstands in 2000. Vertlib has numerous publications spanning short stories, articles, essays, reports, and reviews in German and Austrian newspapers and magazines. These include Die Presse (Spectrum), Wiener Zeitung (Extra), Rheinischer Merkur, FAZ, and Jüdische Allgemeine, as well as periodicals like Wochen Zeitung Zürich, Literatur und Kritik, and SALZ. He participated in the Klagenfurter Literaturkurs 1998 (International Forum for young writers) and the Festival of German-Language Literature, 1999, in Klagenfurt. He held the Dresdner Chamisso Poetics Lectureship in 2006, wrote the libretto for an oratory from Wolfgang R. Kubizek in 2007, and in 2012–13 worked as a lecturer at the Institute of Language Arts at the University of Applied Arts, Vienna.

== Major themes ==
Most of Vertlib's works draw on his autobiographical experience of migration, and therefore deal with the themes of identity, home, and the trauma of being "uprooted." He has stated that due to the migration, he experienced a disrupted childhood and youth. The process of writing helped him deal with the problems of displacement and a compromised sense of belonging, which are paralleled in the lives of his characters. His own identity is not easy to define, evident in reviews that label him "a Russian living in Austria," "a Russian writer," "a Jewish-German writer of Russian descent" and so on. Ultimately, negotiating identity is an important part of Vertlib`s work.

Furthermore, Vertlib's works deal with Judaism and the experience of being a Jewish migrant, capturing the collective history of Russian Jews in the 20th century through stories of individual characters. These examples – composed of true experiences and fiction – are intended to mirror the reader`s own feelings and experiences. Culture is another major theme in Vertlib`s works. Stating he has internalized the Russian, Jewish, and Austrian culture, he found his identity in a space between the cultures. Viewed through Edward Said`s perspective, Vertlib`s works show that cultures might be separated by social and political circumstances, but are not mutually antagonistic per se.

== Literary style ==
Vertlib's writing has been described as sophisticated and provocative with an elaborated narrative structure. His prosaic and precise language is full of irony, depicting tragicomic experiences. He has stated that, for him, finding humour in tragedy has a relieving effect, indicating the significance of irony in his work. Critics praised Vertlib`s works as thrilling as well as entertaining, comparing him to notable authors John Irving, Joseph Roth, and Isaak Singer.

== Awards and nominations ==
- 2000 Österreichischer Förderungspreis für Literatur
- 2001 Förderpreis zum Adelbert-von-Chamisso-Preis
- 2001 Anton-Wildgans-Preis
- 2006 Dresdner Chamisso-Poetikdozentur
- 2012 Adei-Wizo Literature Award Adelina Della Pergola for Zwischenstationen
- 2015 Longlist German Book Award for Lucia Binar und die russische Seele

== Works ==
- Osteuropäische Zuwanderung nach Österreich (1976–1991). Unter besonderer Berücksichtigung der jüdischen Immigration aus der ehemaligen Sowjetunion. Wien: Institut für Demographie, 1995.
- Abschiebung. Salzburg: Müller, 1995. ISBN 3-7013-0902-7
- Zwischenstationen. Wien: Deuticke, 1999. ISBN 3-216-30455-8
- Das besondere Gedächtnis der Rosa Masur. Wien: Deuticke, 2001. ISBN 3-216-30583-X
- Letzter Wunsch. Wien, Deuticke, 2003. ISBN 3-216-30678-X
- Mein erster Mörder: Lebensgeschichten. Wien: Deuticke, 2006. ISBN 978-3-552-06031-9
- Spiegel im fremden Wort. Die Erfindung des Lebens als Literatur. Dresden: Thelem, 2007. ISBN 978-3-939888-28-4
- Vmesne postaje. Ljubljana: Modrijan, 2008. ISBN 978-961-241-195-4
- Am Morgen des zwölften Tages. Wien: Deuticke, 2009. ISBN 978-3-552-06097-5
- Ich und die Eingeborenen: Essays und Aufsätze. Dresden: Thelem, 2012. ISBN 978-3-939888-82-6
- Schimons Schweigen. Wien: Deuticke, 2012. ISBN 978-3-552-06184-2
- Lucia Binar und die russische Seele. Wien: Deuticke, 2015. ISBN 978-3-552-06282-5
- Reise nach A. Hamburg: Literatur-Quickie, 2019. ISBN 978-3-945453-57-5
- Zebra im Krieg. Salzburg: Residenz, 2022. ISBN 978-3-701-71752-1
