= Adelheid Dahimène =

Austrian writer (1956–2010)

Dahimène, Adelheid
- Born: 2 June 1956; Altheim, Austria
- Died: 21 November 2010 (aged 54); Freiburg im Breisgau, Germany
- Occupation: Writer

Adelheid Dahimène (2 June 1956 – 21 November 2010) was an Austrian writer.

== Life ==
Dahimène was born in Altheim on 2 June 1956. After graduating from commercial school in Braunau, she spent some time abroad (Munich, Africa, France, Great Britain), followed by various jobs in market and opinion research, as an accountant and translator. From 1991, Dahimène worked as a freelance copywriter and writer. Among other things, she organized the literature programme in Wels at the "Schl8hof", a cultural center that has been in existence for 25 years. Most recently, the mini-dramas Frisches Blut were premiered there under Adelheid Dahimène's aegis (director: Lucas Cejpek).

Dahimène had three children and lived in Wels. She died at the age of 54 from a serious cancer.

== Awards ==
- Feldkirch Poetry Prize 2006 (1st place)
- Feldkirch Poetry Prize. Staatspreis für Kinder- und Jugendliteratur 2004 for Spezialeinheit Kreiner
- Schönstes Buch Österreichs 2004 for Schnell, Rudi, schnell
- Schönstes Buch Österreichs 2002 for Esel
- Österreichischer Staatspreis für Kinder- und Jugendliteratur 1998 for Indie Underground. Jugendroman in LP-Form
- Max-von-der-Grün-Anerkennungspreis für "Literatur zur Arbeitswelt" der Kammer für Arbeiter und Angestellte für Oberösterreich und der Stadt Linz 1995

== Works ==
- 2011: Wenn Herr Montag mit Frau Freitag. Verlag Bibliothek der Provinz (posthumous)
- 2011: Rauchernovelle. Klever Verlag (posthumous)
- 2010: A little more cheer and hustle and bustle please! Verlag Bibliothek der Provinz
- 2010: Da vorn gibt es was zu lachen. Residenz Verlag
- 2008: Blitzrosa Glamour. Klever Verlag
- 2008: Wir und das neue Tier. Residenz Verlag
- 2007: Weitersagen. Boje Verlag GmbH, Cologne, ISBN 978-3-414-82032-7
- 2006: Das Froschl. Residenz Verlag
- 2005: Esel. Residenz Verlag
- 2005: Buttermesser durch Herz. Fügungen
- 2004: Spinne Spinnerin. Residenz Verlag
- 2004: Schnell, Rudi, schnell!
- 2003: Die seltsame Alte
- 2002: Der Schatten vom Hans
- Spezialeinheit Kreiner. Ein Fall für alle Fälle
- 2002: Voller Mond und leerer Bär
- 2001: Das Brillenhuhn
- 1999: hicks!
- 1999: Ein Affe mit Turnhose und andere halb-afrikanische Geschichten
- 1998: Gar schöne Spiele
- 1997: Indie Underground. Youth novel in LP form
- 1997: Apostroph. Der Strich der Gegend (illustrated by Heide Stöllinger)
- 1996: Meine Seele ist eine schneeweiße Windbäckerei
- 1996: Ma-o-ma in der Sprechblase (illustrated by Heide Stöllinger)
- 1995: Ich, Rosa Lii, die Beträumte
