= Felix Pollak =

American librarian, translator, and poet

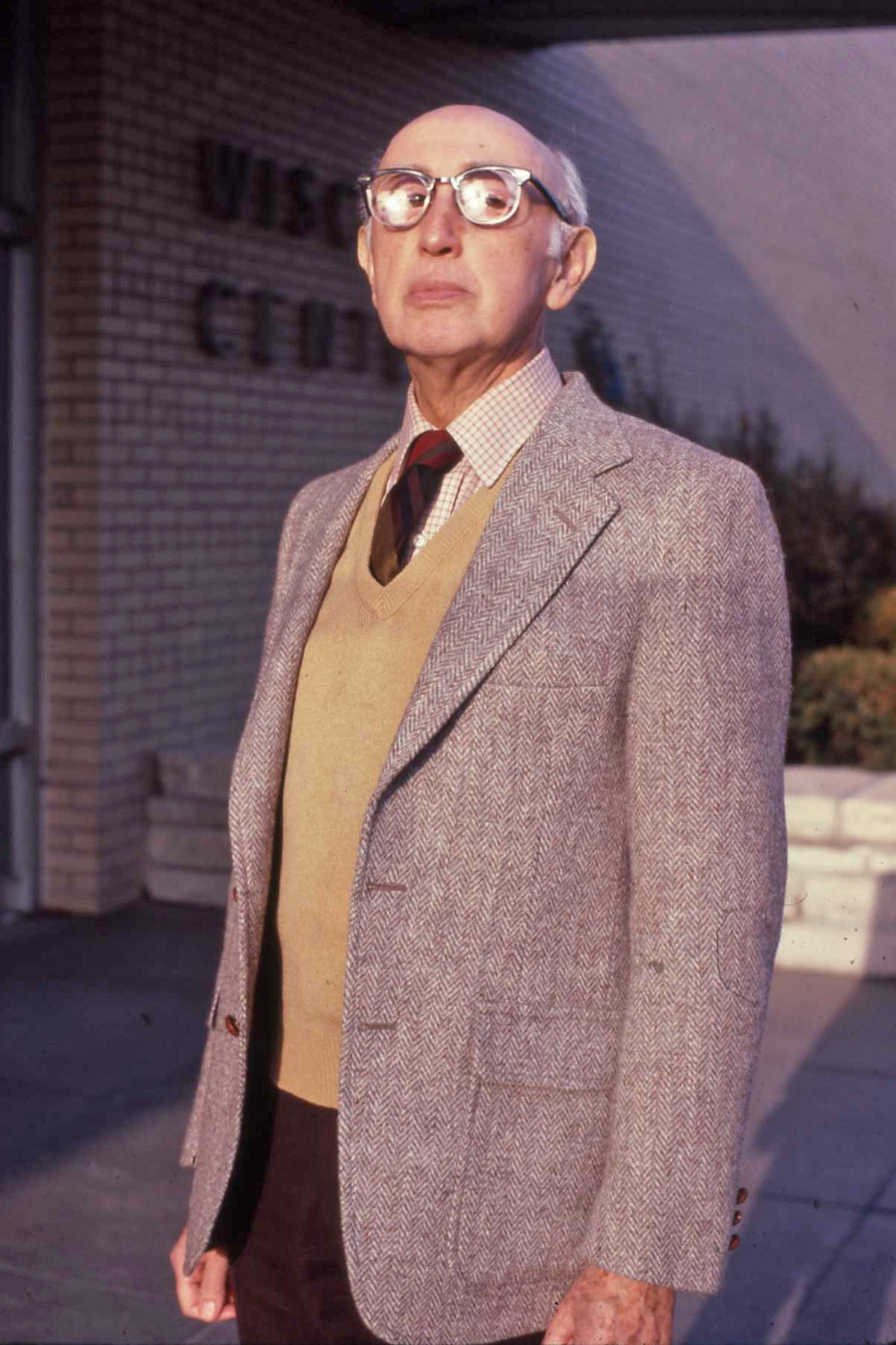
- Felix Pollak in 1984
- Born: November 11, 1909; Vienna, Austria-Hungary
- Died: November 19, 1987 (aged 78)
- Education: University of Buffalo (B.A.); University of Michigan (M.L.S.); University of Vienna (J.D.)

Felix Pollak (November 11, 1909 – November 19, 1987) was an American librarian, translator, and poet.

Pollak was born in Vienna, Austria, in 1909 to Geza Pollak and Helene Schneider Pollak. A Jew and liberal anti-fascist, he studied law and theater at the University of Vienna before emigrating to the United States in 1938 following the annexation of Austria by the Third Reich. He briefly worked as a door-to-door salesman in New York City before enrolling at the University of Buffalo, where he received a Bachelor of Arts degree in library science in 1941.

While working as a librarian, Pollak was drafted into the U.S. Army in 1943, where he worked as a translator for German prisoners of war. After the war, he enrolled at the University of Michigan, where he received a master's degree in library science in 1949. Pollak also received a Dr.Jur. from the University of Vienna in 1953.

From 1949 to 1959, Pollak worked as a rare books librarian at Northwestern University. He became a rare books librarian at the University of Wisconsin-Madison in 1959, where he remained until his retirement in 1974. One of his primary duties was maintaining and developing the Sukov collection of literary magazines (now called the "Little Magazine Collection"), which is one of the world's finest collections of small literary magazines and publications by independent poetry presses. After his retirement, Pollak continued to reside in Madison, Wisconsin, until his death in 1987.

In addition to his work as a librarian, Pollak was an accomplished poet. He published seven volumes of poetry, and his work appeared in a range of publications, including The American Poetry Review, Poetry Northwest, New Letters, Prairie Schooner, Quixote, TriQuarterly, The Madison Review, and the Wisconsin Academy Review. His most well-known poem, "Speaking: The Hero", has frequently been cited as a forceful example of Vietnam war protest poetry, though it was written in response to the Nazi concentration camps and the bombing of Hiroshima.

Since 1994, the University of Wisconsin Press has annually awarded a poetry prize named after Pollak.

== Works ==
- Pollak, Felix. The Castle and the Flaw. New Rochelle, New York: Elizabeth Press, 1963.
- Pollak, Felix. Say When. La Crosse, Wisconsin: Juniper Press, 1969.
- Pollak, Felix. Ginkgo. New Rochelle, New York: Elizabeth Press, 1973.
- Pollak, Felix. Subject to Change. La Crosse, Wisconsin: Juniper Press, 1978.
- Pollak, Felix. Prose and Cons. La Crosse, Wisconsin: Juniper Press, 1983.
- Pollak, Felix. Tunnel Visions. Peoria, Illinois: Spoon River Poetry Press, 1984.
- Pollak, Felix. Benefits of Doubt. Peoria, Illinois: Spoon River Poetry Press, 1988.
- Pollak, Felix. Vom Nutzen des Zweifels. Frankfurt am Main: Fischer, 1989.
- Pollak, Felix. Lebenszeichen. Aphorismen und Marginalien. Vienna: Verlag für Gesellschaftskritik, 1992.
- Mason, Gregory H. (ed.). Arrows of Longing: The Correspondence between Anaïs Nin and Felix Pollak, 1952–1976. Ohio University Press: 1998.
