= Feminist avantgarde =

Feminist Avantgarde: Art of the 1970s is an international series of exhibitions and a book publication curated and edited by the Austrian art historian Gabriele Schor about feminist art in the second half of the twentieth century.

== Background ==
=== Concept of the "feminist avantgarde" ===
Mainstream art history has yet to consider the feminist art movement of the second half of the twentieth century as part of the post-war "avantgarde," which normally includes, for example, Pop Art, Fluxus, and Viennese Actionism. One exception to this neglect, as pointed out by Schor, is Lawrence Alloway, whose 1976 article Women’s Art in the '70s made the claim: “The women’s movement in art can be described as avantgarde, since its protagonists are united in pushing for a change in the existing social order within the art world.“ As late as the 1990s, feminist art of the 1970s was still the subject of occasional mockery, dubbed “housewives’ complaints.” Only later would the art-historical importance of the movement be recognized. The 2007 exhibition WACK! Art and Feminist Revolution, which featured the work of 120 international women artists, represented the first comprehensive intercontextualization of art and feminism. The exhibition was shown in prominent institutions, including the Museum of Contemporary Art in Los Angeles and the Museum of Modern Art in New York. A New York Times critic wrote: “Curators and critics have increasingly come to see that feminism has generated the most influential art impulses of the late twentieth and early twenty-first century. There is almost no new work that has not in some way been shaped by it. [...]” Although the movement’s pioneering historical achievement is uncontested, German-language art-historical reference works – including the renowned Metzler publications – often fail to mention feminist art under the rubric of “avantgarde art.” In using the term “Feminist Avantgarde,” not least for the exhibition title, Schor combined the desires: to emphasize the pioneering achievements of 1970s female artists, to expand the overwhelmingly male avantgarde, and to anchor this revisionist account within the history of art.

=== Characteristics of 1970s feminist art ===
Feminist artists in Europe and in North and South America focused on particular themes: the denunciation of women’s situation in family, social and political contexts, women’s own self-representations, the liberation of female bodies from aesthetic idealization, and the expansion of the private sphere into public life. Feminist artists, reflecting on these issues in visual form, should be regarded as pioneers of artistic expression on these issues. Feminist art of the 1970s deconstructed images of women which had, for centuries and even millennia, been almost exclusively formulated by men. They created new representations of women in visual art. Feminist artists acted in accordance with the popular slogan of the women’s movement: the supposedly private and personal was made public, and shown to be politically relevant.

Feminist artists primarily used new media like photography, film and video, as well as installations, actions and performances. They regarded these media as less preconditioned by male-dominated art history than either painting or sculpture. At a time when photography, and certainly not video, were not yet generally recognized as art forms, these media allowed female artists to express themselves independently of the art historical tradition. New media enabled their works to address contemporary themes – including gender roles and the politics of the body – more quickly and in a more immediately relevant way.

Feminist art of the 1970s marked the first attempt to comprehensively address female eroticism from the point of view of women. This frequently took them very far from ideals of beauty as normalized by society, and often directly contested those ideals. Some female artists (including Penny Slinger, Renate Bertlmann, and VALIE EXPORT) staged their bodies and their vulvas in original ways, partly humorous and cheerful, partly (self-)aggressive. Judy Chicago’s “Dinner Party” presented a table full of vulva-symbols in the form of painted plates and ceramic reliefs. In 1972, rebelling against the compulsion to be beautiful, Ana Mendieta pressed her face against a glass plane, so as to squash and distort it. A few years later, while unaware of Mendieta’s work, Katalin Ladik did something similar in Yugoslavia. Other female artists made work relating to allegorical statues and paintings. For centuries, men had constructed these female figures, which were either beautiful allegories standing, for example, for “Justice” or “Wisdom,” or else represented female saints and goddesses. In her video performances, Ulrike Rosenbach used superimpositions, including Botticelli’s painting The Birth of Venus. In “Don’t you think I am an Amazon?” Rosenbach shot arrows at a reproduction of Stefan Lochner’s Madonna of the Rose Bower and thus also at herself, since her own face was projected onto the figure of Mary. In this way, her image mixes that of the pure, asexual Mary with that of an Amazon: Rosenbach intended to deconstruct the clichés of these two female images. The photographer Cindy Sherman was another artist to go particularly far in using roleplay to undo outdated stereotypes of women.

In addition, the works of 1970s feminist artists were the first to take on board a central notion of French post-structuralism: they questioned the Western notion of the subject, which imagined the human being (especially the white, heterosexual male) as a unified, self-aware being with an unambiguous identity. In this way, feminist works and actions critiqued the male-dominated image of women, but also fundamentally understood human subjectivity as something more transparent and mutable. One typical move made by 1970s feminist art was, for example, the ironic appropriation and display of “male,” macho poses, using their own female, partly naked bodies. In doing so, they transgressed conceptions of individuals and societies which were based on two starkly differentiated genders.

== Exhibition series ==
The Feminist Avantgarde exhibitions have encompassed more than six hundred works by female artists born between 1915 and 1958. They come from across the globe, from Western and Eastern Europe, North America and Latin America, including numerous African-American and Asian artists. The works were collected on the basis of research begun by Gabriele Schor in 2004 for the Verbund Collection in Vienna. Alongside works by well-known artists, and photographic documentation of their actions, the exhibition series also includes works forgotten for decades, by both known and unknown artists. The exhibition had its first showing in 2010 in the Galleria Nazionale d’Arte Moderna in Rome. It went on to be shown in Madrid, Brussels, Halmstad (Sweden), Hamburg, London, Vienna, Karlsruhe (Germany), Stavanger (Norway), Brno (Czech Republic) and Barcelona.

Many of the works exhibited aim to banish and overcome traditional roles ascribed to women. Feminist artists understood the roles of housewife, spouse and mother as restrictive, rendering women into objects and even victims of patriarchal society. Through their art and actions, feminist artists sought to attain more autonomy, creating new images of women, including a more free experience of their own sexuality. Female artists involved in the movement made use of everyday activities, including housework, family life, motherhood and “making oneself beautiful (for men),” in order to distance themselves from these phenomena, to grow beyond them, playing with and re-signifying these activities. Many female artists found dramatic images to express their rebellion against being reduced to the roles of housewife and mother. In 1975, Birgit Jürgenssen draped herself with a kitchen apron in the form of an oven; Renate Eisenegger ironed a corridor; Karin Mack lay prone on an ironing board; Annegret Soltau tied herself up with threads, while other female artists did the same with ropes. Whether using clothes pegs or Scotch tape, many female artists used everyday objects as a form of bondage, often to the point of inflicting pain on themselves.

== Themes ==
The exhibition is divided into four sections:

- breaking out of one-dimensional role ascriptions as mother, housewife and wife
- role-plays
- the normativity of beauty
- female sexuality

== Locations ==
- Donna. Avanguardia femminista negli anni '70, Galleria Nazionale d’Arte Moderna, Rome, Italy, February 19 – May 16 2010
- Mujer. La vanguardia feminista de los anos 70, PHotoEspana, Círculo de Bellas Artes, Madrid, Spain, June 3 – September 1 2013
- Woman. The Feminist Avant-garde from the 1970s. Works from the Sammlung Verbund collection, Vienna. Palais des Beaux-Arts de Bruxelles, Belgium, June 18 – August 31, 2014
- Woman - Internationellt feministiskt avantgarde från 1970-talet Works. Foto & video från Sammlung Verbund. Mjellby konstmuseum – Halmstadgruppens museum, Halmstad, Sweden, September 20, 2014 – January 11, 2015
- Feministische Avantgarde der 1970er-Jahre. Werke aus der Sammlung Verbund, Wien. Hamburger Kunsthalle, Hamburg, Germany, March 13 – May 31 2015
- Feminist Avant-Garde of the 1970s. Works from the Sammlung Verbund Collection, Vienna, The Photographers’ Gallery, London, UK, October 6, 2016 – January 8, 2017
- Woman. Feministische Avantgarde der 1970er-Jahre. Werke aus der Sammlung Verbund, Wien, Museum Moderner Kunst Stiftung Ludwig Wien, Vienna, Austria, May 4 – September 10, 2017
- Feministische Avantgarde der 1970er Jahre aus der Sammlung Verbund, Wien, ZKM Zentrum für Kunst und Medien, Karlsruhe, November 18, 2017 – April 1, 2018
- Woman. The Feminist Avant-Garde of the 1970s. Works from the Sammlung Verbund collection, Vienna, MUST Stavanger Art Museum, Stavanger, Norway, June 15 – October 14, 2018
- Feminist Avant-garde / Art of the 1970s, Sammlung Verbund Collection, Vienna, Dům umění města Brna (Haus der Kunst der Stadt Brünn), Czech Republic, December 12 2018 – February 24 2019
- Feminisms! CCCB – Centre de Cultura Contemporània de Barcelona, Spain, July 19 2019 – January 6 2020.

== Featured artists ==
- Helena Almeida (* 1934–2018)
- Emma Amos (* 1973)
- Sonia Andrade (* 1935)
- Eleanor Antin (* 1935)
- Anneke Barger (* 1939)
- Lynda Benglis (* 1941)
- Judith Bernstein (* 1942)
- Renate Bertlmann (* 1943)
- Tomaso Binga (* 1931)
- Dara Birnbaum (* 1946)
- Teresa Burga (* 1935)
- Marcella Campagnano (* 1941)
- Elizabeth Catlett (1915–2012)
- Judy Chicago (* 1939)
- Linda Christanell (* 1939)
- Veronika Dreier (* 1954)
- Orshi Drozdik (* 1946)
- Lili Dujourie (* 1941)
- Mary Beth Edelson (* 1933)
- Renate Eisenegger (* 1949)
- Rose English (* 1950)
- VALIE EXPORT (* 1940)
- Gerda Fassel (* 1941)
- Esther Ferrer (* 1937)
- Marisa Gonzalez (* 1943)
- Eulàlia Grau (* 1946)
- Barbara Hammer (1939–2019)
- Margaret Harrison (* 1940)
- Lynn Hershman Leeson (* 1941)
- Alexis Hunter (1948–2014)
- Mako Idemitsu (* 1940)
- Sanja Iveković (* 1949)
- Birgit Jürgenssen (1949–2003)
- Kirsten Justesen (* 1943)
- Auguste Kronheim (* 1937)
- Ketty La Rocca (1938–1976)
- Leslie Labowitz (* 1946)
- Suzanne Lacy (* 1945)
- Katalin Ladik (* 1942)
- Suzy Lake (* 1947)
- Brigitte Lang (* 1953)
- Natalia LL (* 1937)
- Lea Lublin (1929–1999)
- Karin Mack (* 1940)
- Dindga McCannon (* 1947)
- Ana Mendieta (1948–1985)
- Anita Münz (* 1957)
- Rita Myers (* 1947)
- Senga Nengudi (* 1943)
- Lorraine O’Grady (* 1934)
- Orlan (* 1944)
- Florentina Pakosta (* 1933)
- Gina Pane (1939–1990)
- Letícia Parente (1930–1991)
- Ewa Partum (* 1945)
- Friederike Pezold (* 1945)
- Margot Pilz (* 1936)
- Howardena Pindell (* 1943)
- Ingeborg G. Pluhar (* 1944)
- Lotte Profohs (1934–2012)
- Angels Ribé (* 1943)
- Ulrike Rosenbach (* 1943)
- Martha Rosler (* 1943)
- Brigitte Aloise Roth (1951–2018)
- Suzanne Santoro (* 1946)
- Carolee Schneemann (1939–2019)
- Lydia Schouten (* 1955)
- Elaine Shemilt (* 1954)
- Cindy Sherman (* 1954)
- Penny Slinger (* 1947)
- Annegret Soltau (* 1946)
- Anita Steckel (1930–2012)
- Gabriele Stötzer (* 1953)
- Betty Tompkins (* 1945)
- Regina Vater (* 1943)
- Marianne Wex (* 1937)
- Hannah Wilke (1940–1993)
- Martha Wilson (* 1947)
- Francesca Woodman (1958–1981)
- Nil Yalter(* 1938)

== Publications ==
- Gabriele Schor (Hrsg.) Avantguardia Feminista Negli Anni '70, dalla Sammlung Verbund di Vienna. Electa, Rome 2010, ISBN 978-88-370-7414-2
- Gabriele Schor (Hrsg.): Feministische Avantgarde. Kunst der 1970er-Jahre. Werke aus der Sammlung Verbund, Wien. (publication accompanying exhibition). Revised and expanded edition, Prestel, Munich 2016, ISBN 978-3-7913-5627-3. The book, which appears in both German and English, includes texts on and illustrations of the work of all exhibited artists, as well as four art historical essays, by Gabriele Schor, Mechtild Widrich, Merle Radtke and Brigitte Borchhardt-Birbaumer.
- In the summer of 2020, an expanded edition of the book will appear in English: Feminist Avant-Garde: Art of the 1970s in the Verbund Collection, Vienna, hardback, 672 pp., 23 × 28 cm, 200 color illustrations, 500 b/w illustrations. ISBN 978-3-7913-5971-7

== Awards ==
- Vienna Art Award 2013
- ACCA Award (L’Associació Catalana de Crítics d’Art Award), Barcelona 2019
