= List of feminist avant-garde artists of the 1970s =

This is a list of feminist avant-garde artists of the 1970s. The initial choice of artists for the list was based on their inclusion in Vienna's Sammlung Verbund, and its internationally-shown exhibition tour The Feminist Avant-Garde of the 1970s: Works from the Sammlung Verbund.

- Helena Almeida (1934–2018, Portugal)
- Eleanor Antin (born 1935, USA)
- Eugenia Balcells (born 1943, Spain)
- Anneke Barger(born 1939, NL)
- Lynda Benglis (born 1941, USA)
- Judith Bernstein (born 1942, USA)
- Renate Bertlmann (born 1943, Austria)
- Teresa Burga (born 1935, Peru)
- Marcella Campagnano (born 1941, IT)
- Judy Chicago (born 1939, USA)
- Mari Chordá (born 1942, Spain)
- Linda Christanell (born 1939, Austria)
- Lili Dujourie (born 1941, Belgium)
- Mary Beth Edelson (born 1933, USA)
- Renate Eisenegger (born 1949, Germany)
- Valie Export (born 1940, Austria)
- Esther Ferrer (born 1937, Spain)
- Marisa González (born 1943, Spain)
- Eulalia Grau (born 1946, Spain)
- Lynn Hershman Leeson (born 1941, USA)
- Alexis Hunter (1948–2014, USA)
- Sanja Iveković (born 1949, Croatia)
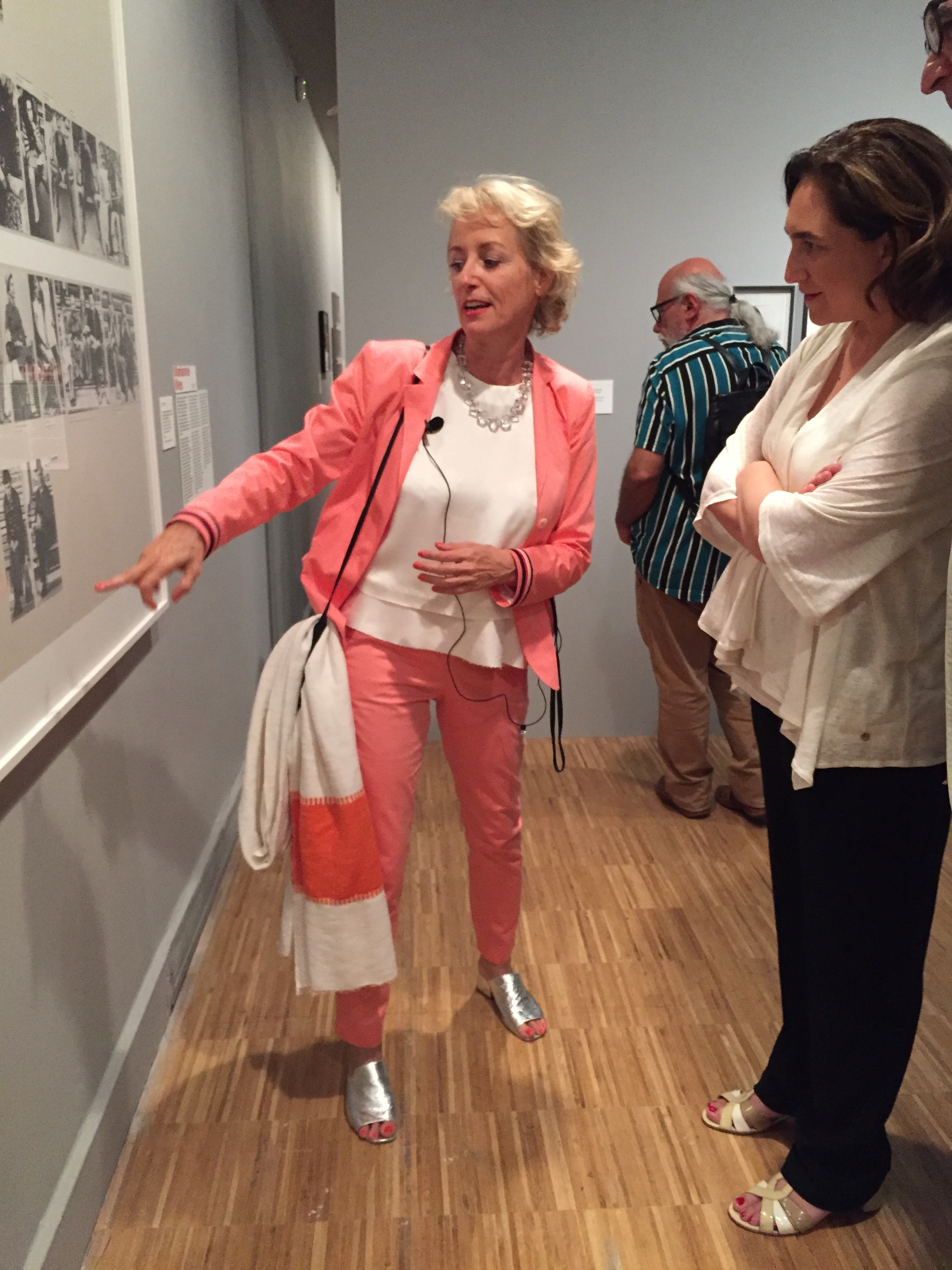
- The curator Gabriele Schor in Barcelona
  Birgit Jürgenssen (1949–2003, Austria)
- Kirsten Justesen (born 1943, Denmark)
- Ketty La Rocca (1938–1976, Italy)
- Leslie Labowitz (born 1946, USA)
- Katalin Ladik (born 1942, Serbia)
- Brigitte Lang (born 1953, Austria)
- Suzanne Lacy (born 1945, USA)
- Suzy Lake (born 1947, USA)
- Karin Mack (born 1940, Austria)
- Ana Mendieta (1948–1985, Cuba/USA)
- Annette Messager (born 1943, France)
- Rita Myers (born 1947, USA)
- Lorraine O'Grady (born 1934, USA)
- ORLAN (born 1947, France)
- Gina Pane (1939–1990, France)
- Letícia Parente (1930–1991, Brazil)
- Ewa Partum (born 1945, Poland)
- Friederike Pezold (born 1945, Austria)
- Margot Pilz (born 1936, The Netherlands)
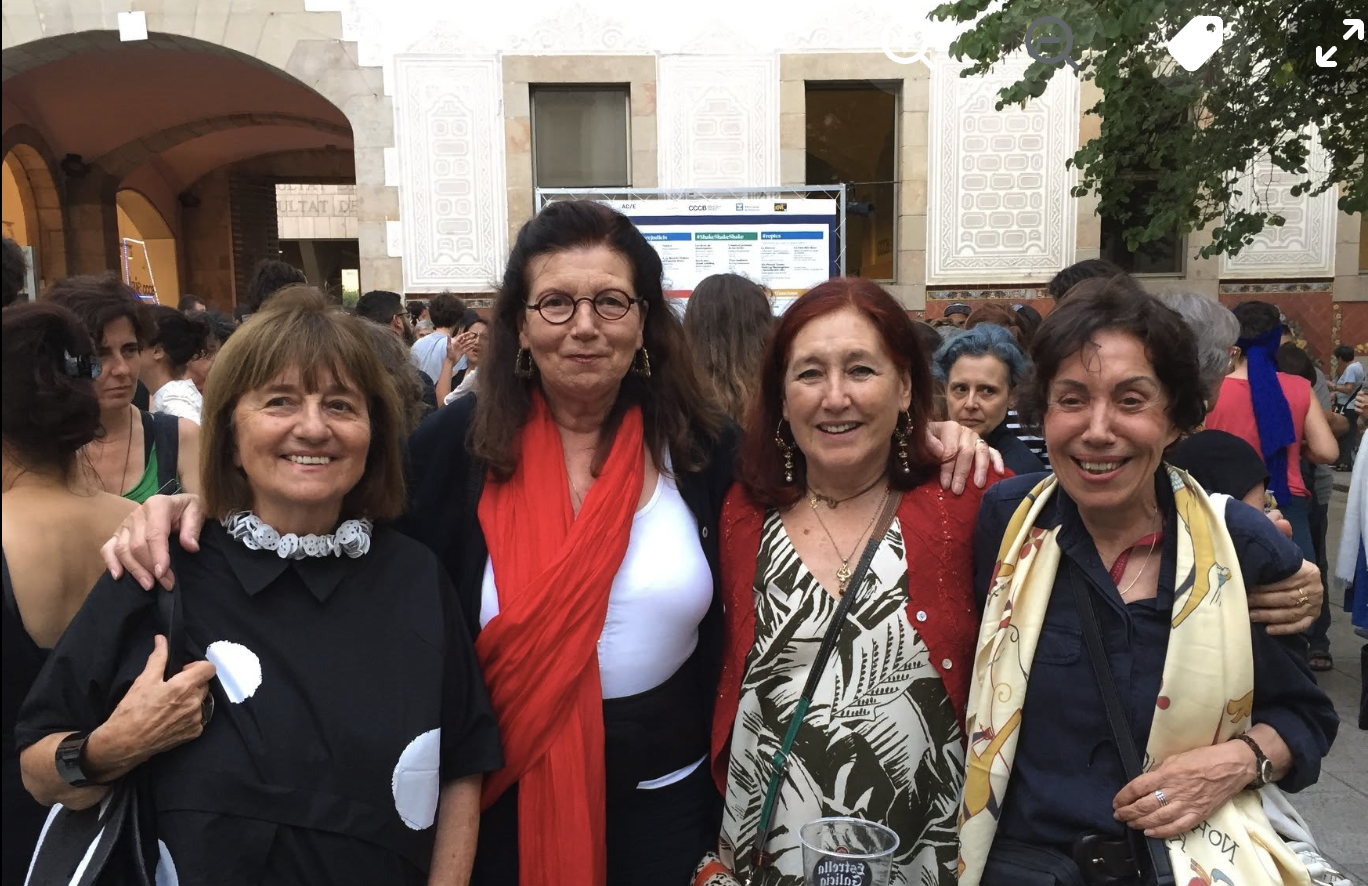
  Marisa Gonzalez, Ulrike Rosenbach, Eugenia Balcells, Eulalia Grau in the openning of the exhibition in CCCB Barcelona, year 2019.
- Angels Ribé (1943, Spain)
- Ulrike Rosenbach (born 1943, Germany)
- Martha Rosler (born 1943, USA)
- Suzanne Santoro (born 1946, USA)
- Carolee Schneemann (1939–2019, USA)
- Lydia Schouten (born 1948, The Netherlands)
- Cindy Sherman (born 1957, USA)
- Penny Slinger (born 1947, UK)
- Annegret Soltau (born 1946, Germany)
- Hannah Wilke (1940–1993, USA)
- Martha Wilson (born 1947, USA)
- Nancy Wilson-Pajic (born 1941, USA)
- Francesca Woodman (1958–1981, USA)
- Nil Yalter (born 1938, Turkey)
