= WACK! Art and the Feminist Revolution =

Exhibition of international women's art

WACK!: Art and the Feminist Revolution
- Editors: Cornelia Butler; Lisa Gabrielle Mark
- Cover artist: Martha Rosler, "Hot House, or Harem," from the series "Body Beautiful, or Beauty Knows No Pain," 1966-72, detail
- Subject: Art and the feminist revolution
- Genre: Information and Reference Book
- Published: 2007 The MIT Press
- ISBN: 978-0-914357-99-5

WACK!: Art and the Feminist Revolution was an exhibition of international women's art presented at the Museum of Contemporary Art, Los Angeles from March 4–July 16, 2007. It later traveled to the National Museum of Women in the Arts (September 21--December 16, 2007) and the PS1 Contemporary Art Center, where it was on view February 17–May 12, 2008. The exhibition featured works from 120 artists and artists' groups from around the world.

The 2007 exhibition catalogue—also titled WACK!: Art and the Feminist Revolution—documents this first major retrospective of art and the feminist revolution. Edited by Cornelia Butler and Lisa Gabrielle Mark, it has essays by Butler, Judith Russi Kirshner, Catherine Lord, Marsha Meskimmon, Richard Meyer, Helen Molesworth, Peggy Phelan, Nelly Richard, Valerie Smith, Abigail Solomon-Godeau, and Jenni Sorkin.

WACK! surveyed work by more than 120 artists in a wide variety of media, arranged by themes including Abstraction, "Autophotography," Body as Medium, Family Stories, Gender Performance, Knowledge as Power, Making Art History, and others.

== Artists included in the exhibition and catalogue ==
- Magdalena Abakanowicz (1930–2017), Polish sculptor and fiber artist
- Marina Abramović (born 1946), Serbian and former Yugoslavian performance artist
- Carla Accardi (1924–2014), Italian painter
- Chantal Akerman (1950–2015), Belgian film director and artist
- Helena Almeida (1934–2018), Portuguese artist
- Sonia Andrade (born 1935), Brazilian artist
- Eleanor Antin (born 1935), American artist
- Judith F. Baca (born 1946), American Chicana artist
- Mary Bauermeister (1934–2023), German artist
- Lynda Benglis (born 1941), American artist
- Berwick Street Film Collective
- Camille Billops (1933–2019), African-American artist
- Dara Birnbaum (born 1946), American video and installation artist
- Louise Bourgeois (1911–2010), French-American artist and sculptor
- Sheila Levrant de Bretteville (born 1940), American graphic designer and artist
- Theresa Hak Kyung Cha (1951–1982), South Korean-born American novelist and artist
- Judy Chicago (born 1939), American artist
- Lygia Clark (1920–1988), Brazilian artist
- Tee Corinne (1943–2006), American artist
- Niki de Saint Phalle (1030–2002), Jean Tinguely (1925–1991), and Per Olof Ultvedt
- Jay DeFeo (1929–1989), American artist
- Disband
- Assia Djebar (1936–2015), Algerian filmmaker
- Rita Donagh (born 1939), British artist
- Kirsten Dufour (born 1941), Danish artist
- Lili Dujourie (born 1941), Belgian video artist
- Mary Beth Edelson (1933–2021), American artist
- Rose English British performance artist
- VALIE EXPORT (born 1940), Austrian artist
- Jacqueline Fahey (born 1929), New Zealand painter
- Louise Fishman (1939–2021), American painter
- Audrey Flack (born 1931), American artist
- Iole de Freitas (born 1945), Brazilian photographer and filmmaker
- Isa Genzken (born 1948), German artist
- Nancy Grossman (born 1940), American artist
- Barbara Hammer (1939–2019), American filmmaker
- Harmony Hammond (born 1944), American artist and writer
- Margaret Harrison (born 1940), English artist
- Mary Heilmann (born 1940), American artist
- Lynn Hershman (born 1941), American artist and filmmaker
- Eva Hesse (1936–1970), Jewish German-born American sculptor
- Susan Hiller (1940–2019), American artist
- Rebecca Horn (born 1944), German visual artist
- Alexis Hunter (1948–2014), New Zealand painter and photographer
- Mako Idemitsu (born 1940), Japanese filmmaker
- Sanja Iveković (born 1949), Croatian photographer, sculptor and installation artist
- Joan Jonas (born 1936), American video and performance artist
- Kirsten Justesen (born 1943), Danish artist
- Mary Kelly (born 1941), American conceptual artist
- Joyce Kozloff (born 1942), American artist
- Friedl Kubelka (born 1946), Austrian photographer
- Shigeko Kubota (1937–2015), Japanese-born video artist, sculptor and performance artist
- Yayoi Kusama (1929-2026), Japanese artist and writer
- Ketty La Rocca (1938-1976), Italian artist
- Suzanne Lacy (born 1945), American artist
- Suzy Lake (born 1947), American-Canadian artist
- Maria Lassnig (1919–2014), Austrian artist
- Lesbian Art Project (1977–1979), participatory art movement in Los Angeles
- Lee Lozano (1930–1999), American artist
- Léa Lublin (1929–1999), Polish, Argentine, and French performance artist
- Anna Maria Maiolino (born 1942), Italian-Brazilian artist
- Mónica Mayer (born 1954), Mexican artist
- Ana Mendieta (1948–1985), Cuban American performance artist, sculptor, painter and video artist
- Annette Messager (born 1943), French visual artist
- Marta Minujín and Richard Squires
- Nasreen Mohamedi (1937–1990), Indian artist
- Linda M. Montano (born 1942), American performance artist
- Ree Morton (1936–1977), American artist
- Laura Mulvey and Peter Wollen (1938–2019)
- Alice Neel (1900–1984), American artist
- Senga Nengudi (born 1943), African-American artist
- Ann Newmarch (1945–2022), Australian artist
- Lorraine O’Grady (born 1934), American conceptual artist
- Pauline Oliveros (1932–2016), American composer
- Yoko Ono (born 1933), Japanese multimedia artist
- ORLAN (born 1947), French artist
- Ulrike Ottinger (born 1942), German filmmaker
- Gina Pane (1939–1990), French artist
- Catalina Parra (born 1940), Chilean artist
- Ewa Partum (born 1945), Polish-German artist
- Howardena Pindell (born 1943), American abstract artist
- Adrian Piper (born 1948), American conceptual artist
- Sylvia Plimack Mangold (born 1938), American artist, painter, printmaker, and pastelist
- Sally Potter (born 1949), English filmmaker and performance artist
- Yvonne Rainer (born 1934), American dancer, choreographer, and filmmaker
- Ursula Reuter Christiansen (born 1943), German-Danish filmmaker and painter
- Lis Rhodes (born 1942), British artist
- Faith Ringgold (born 1930) African-American artist
- Ulrike Rosenbach (born 1943), German video and performance artist
- Martha Rosler (born 1943), American artist
- Betye Saar (born 1926), American artist
- Miriam Schapiro (1923–2015), Canadian-born American artist
- Mira Schendel (1919–1988), Brazilian artist
- Carolee Schneemann (1939–2019), American artist
- Joan Semmel (born 1932), American feminist painter
- Bonnie Sherk (1945–2021), American landscape architect and performance artist
- Cindy Sherman (born 1954), American photographer
- Katharina Sieverding (born 1941), Czech photographer
- Sylvia Sleigh (1916–2010), Welsh-born American realist painter
- Alexis Smith (born 1949), American artist
- Barbara T. Smith (born 1931), American performance artist
- Mimi Smith (born 1942), American artist
- Juliana Snapper (born 1972), American vocalist and performance artist
- Joan Snyder (born 1940), American painter
- Valerie Solanas (1936–1988), American writer
- Annegret Soltau (born 1946), German artist
- Nancy Spero (1926–2009), American artist
- Spiderwoman Theater
- Lisa Steele (born 1947), Canadian video artist
- Sturtevant (1924–2014), American artist
- Cosey Fanni Tutti (born 1951), English performance artist
- Mierle Laderman Ukeles (born 1939), American artist
- Cecilia Vicuña (born 1947), Chilean poet, artist and filmmaker
- June Wayne (1918–2011), American printmaker, tapestry designer and painter
- "Where We At" Black Women Artists
- Colette Whiten (born 1945), sculpture, installation and performance artist
- Faith Wilding (born 1943), Paraguayan American multidisciplinary artist
- Hannah Wilke (1940–1993), American artist
- Francesca Woodman (1958–1981), American photographer
- Nil Yalter, Judy Blum Reddy, and Nicole Croiset
- Nil Yalter (born 1938), Egyptian-French artist, co-founder of Groupe de Cinq
- Zarina (1937–2020), Indian-American artist
