= Gabriele Schor =

Austrian writer, art critic and curator

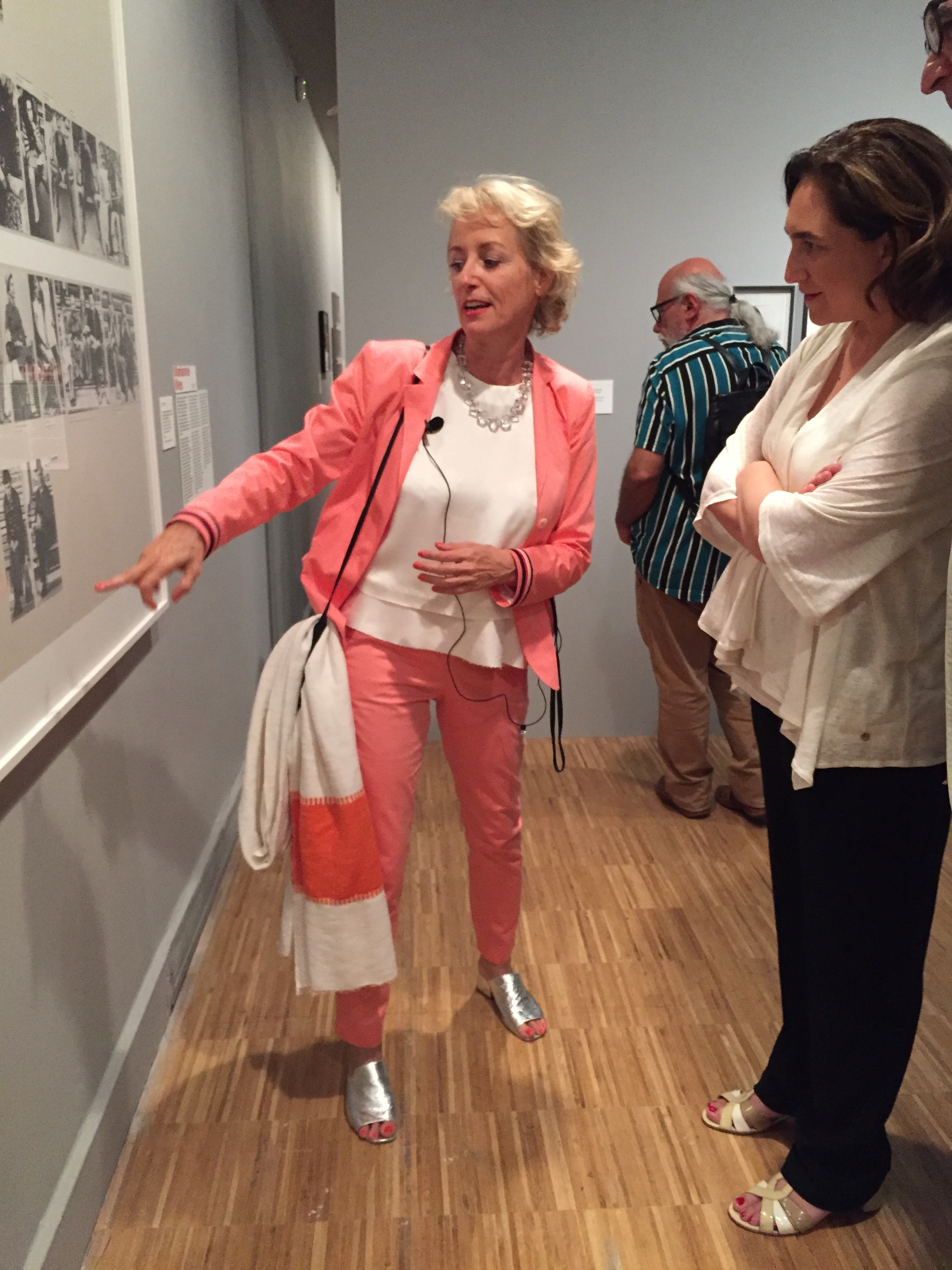
- Born: 1961 (age 64–65); Vienna, Austria
- Occupations: Writer, art critic, curator
- Movement: Feminism, Feminist avantgarde

Gabriele Schor (born 1961) is an Austrian writer, art critic and curator. She is a specialist in the feminist avantgarde of the 1970s.

== Biography ==
Gabriele Schor studied philosophy in Vienna and art history in San Diego. The subject of her doctorate is the sculptor Alberto Giacometti. She worked for the Tate Gallery in London. In 1996, she curated the exhibition on Barnett Newman at the Staatsgalerie Stuttgart and at the Albertina in Vienna. She worked as a correspondent and art critic for the Neue Zürcher Zeitung in Vienna for seven years.

She is a professor of modern art and art history at the University of Graz, the University of Salzburg and the University of Vienna. In 2004, Gabriele Schor founded and directed the Verbund Collection in Vienna, focusing on the feminist avantgarde of the 1970s.

Gabriele Schor introduces the "feminist avantgarde" expression and theme into the history of art to highlight the achievements of the pioneering artists of the seventies. She has published numerous monographs on feminist artists. In January 2012, she published a catalog on the early work of Cindy Sherman.

== The Feminist Avantgarde ==
Gabriele Schor shows the importance of the feminist avantgarde of the 1970s in the history of art. Female artists claim their position as artists and their recognition by the art world. They also claim their position and recognition in society. They advocate self-determination and the reappropriation of the image of women in an artistic world dominated by men. They are the expression and reflection of a movement that challenges female role models and the social assignments of women in society.

Female artists take on new media such as photography, experimental film, video art, performance and action, collage and installations. They come together for performative actions and work together to organize their own exhibitions. Artists of the feminist avant-garde question and challenge the traditional image and role of women. They question art and society, the vision of women. They propose new images with which women can identify. They mark a break in the history of art. The themes addressed are the roles of women as mothers, housewives, wives, female sexuality and appropriation of the body, violence against women. They also take up political issues such as the Vietnam War.

In 2019, the exhibition in Barcelona at the Center for Contemporary Culture links the concerns of the feminist avantgarde of the 1970s and the current movement with Catalan artists such as Eugenia Balcells, Eulalia Grau, Fine Miralles Nobell and Angels Ribé.

== International exhibitions ==
- Héros je joins avec l'eau, Sammlung Verbund, MAK Museum of Applied Arts, Vienna, 2007
- L'avant-garde féministe des années 1970
  - Galleria Nazionale d'Arte Moderna, Roma, 2010
  - Círculo de Bellas Artes, Madrid, 2013
  - BOZAR, Bruxelles, 2014
  - Mjellby Art Museum, Sweden, 2014
  - Hamburger Kunsthalle, Hamburg, 2015
  - The Photographer's Gallery, London, 2016-2017
  - ZKM Center for Art and Media Karlsruhe, Karlsruhe, 2017-2018
  - The Brno House of Arts, Brno, 2018-2019
  - Centre de Cultura Contemporània de Barcelona, Barcelona, 2019
- Birgit Jürgenssen, First retrospective, Sammlung Verbund, Vienna, 2010
- Cindy Sherman. The first works 1975–1977, Geneva Center of Photography, Geneva, 2012
- Francesca Woodman / Birgit Jürgenssen, Works by SAMMLUNG VERBUND, Art Merano, Italy, 2015

== National exhibitions ==
- Double Face, Works by SAMMLUNG VERBUND, Vienna, 2008
- Immeubles, Works by SAMMLUNG VERBUND, Vienna, 2008
- Prêt Nguyen – Principe Zartgefühl, Works by SAMMLUNG VERBUND, Vienna, 2011
- Espaces ouverts | lieux secrets, Works by SAMMLUNG VERBUND, Vienna, 2013
- Fon monde privé, Works by SAMMLUNG VERBUND, Vienna, 2014
- Renate Bertlmann. Maître Ergo Sum, Works by SAMMLUNG VERBUND, Vienna, 2016
- Louise Lawler, ELLE EST ICI, Works by SAMMLUNG VERBUND, Vienna, 2018–2019

== Books ==
- Barnett Newman Die Druckgraphik 1961–1969, with Ulrike Gauss, Hatje Cantz Verlag, Ostfildern, 1996, ISBN 3-7757-0605-4
- Héros je joins avec l'eau, Art of the SAMMLUNG VERBUND, Vienna, Hatje Cantz Verlag, Ostfildern, 2007, ISBN 978-3-7757-1952-0
- Birgit Jürgenssen, collection Verbund, with Abigail Solomon-Godeau, Vienna, Hatje Cantz Verlag, Ostfildern, 2009, ISBN 978-3-7757-2460-9
- Donna: Avanguardia Femminista Negli Anni '70 dalla, collection Verbund, Vienna, Mondadori Elected, Milan, 2010, ISBN 978-88-370-7414-2
- Birgit Jürgenssen, with Heike Eipeldauer, Prestel, Munich, 2011, ISBN 978-3-7913-5103-2
- Cindy Sherman, The first works 1975–1977, Hatje Cantz Verlag, Ostfildern, 2012, ISBN 978-3-7757-2980-2
- Open spaces, secret spaces, Works of the SAMMLUNG VERBUND, Vienna, Salzburg Museum of Modernity Mönchsberg Verlag, 2013, ISBN 978-3-86335-266-0
- Francesca Woodman, with Elisabeth Bronfen, Works of the SAMMLUNG VERBUND, King Bookstore, Cologne, 2014, ISBN 978-3-86335-352-0
- The feminist avantgarde, Art of the 70's of the SAMMLUNG VERBUND, Vienna, Prestel Verlag, Munich, 2015, ISBN 978-3-7913-5445-3
- Renate Bertlmann. Works 1969-2016, with Jessica Morgan, A Subversive Political Program Prestel Verlag, Munich, 2016, ISBN 978-3-7913-5530-6
- Espaces ouverts, espaces secrets, Works of the SAMMLUNG VERBUN, Bozar Books & Collection Verbund, Vienna, 2016, ISBN 978-90-74816-50-2
- The feminist avant-garde, the art of the seventies, Works of the SAMMLUNG VERBUND, Vienna, Prestel Verlag, Munich, 2016, ISBN 978-3-7913-5446-0
- Louise Lawler, works by Louise Lawler acquired by the VERBUND COLLECTION, Vienna & Others, Walter König, Cologne, 2018, ISBN 978-3-96098-451-1
