= Karin Mack =

Austrian photographer

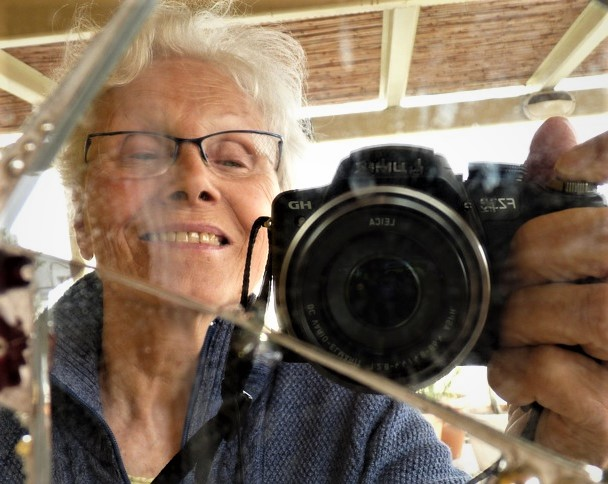
- Born: 1940 (age 85–86); Vienna, Austria
- Education: University of Vienna
- Occupations: Post-war photo artist, author and curator
- Known for: conceptual feminist photography
- Awards: Prize of the City of Vienna for Fine Arts
- Website: http://www.karinmack.at/

Karin Mack is an Austrian post-war photo artist, who belongs to the avant-garde feminist art of the 1970s. She is known primarily for generating her themes from very personal introspection and then presenting them as if "in a theater of self-events".

== Life and career ==
Mack was born in Vienna in 1940, and was married to Friedrich Achleitner (1962-1972). Before completing her studies in the history of art and Italian at the University of Vienna, she worked as a photographer of architecture till 1978. She did several documentaries based on the art and culture of Vienna till 1980. From 1977 to 1982, she was involved in the group "Intakt" (International Action Group for Women Artists) to improve the situation of women artists.

In 1994, Mack moved to the Netherlands, where she lived until 2005. Since 2008, she has been a member of the Lower Austrian photo and media initiative Fluss and the Künstlerhaus Wien. Between 2014 and 2018, she has served as a Curator for several exhibitions including, "Buchstaben, Worte, Texte in fotografischen Bildern", "Experiment Analog", and "Ultima Thule/ Island als Naration." She works as a freelance photo artist, author, and curator in Vienna.

== Work ==
Mack was given her first camera at the age of 16 by her father, who gave her first instructions concerning the composition of an image. Later in the 1970s she saw Photocostallations of Gerhard Rühm, which gave her the idea of combining several photos to tell a story. She started her artistic work with photo series such as Ironing Dream (1975) and Demolishing an Illusion (1977), reflecting a woman's role as housewife only. In the 1980s she started to work with photocollage, consisting of 3 photographs with a selfportrait in the center. These works focused on the feelings of a woman. Between 2012 and 2018, she worked on European Identity in a Global World, which showed her political interest in the truth of journalism. She got the idea of Scratching the Surface by the "unreflected use of fashion by young women" as presented by publicity and fashion magazines as the ideal of attraction and not underlining their identity. Some part of her work deals with nature as something that has to be protected.

== Selected exhibitions ==
- 1985: The self-portraits 1975–1985, Photo Gallery Vienna
- 2004: Woman in the picture / opposing positions, Museum of Modern Art (Passau)
- 2007: Kunstwege '70. Photographs by Karin Mack, Wienmuseum (catalog)
- 2008: Sound of Art, Museum der Moderne Salzburg
- 2008: IntAkt - The Pioneers, Work Show XIII, Photo Gallery Vienna
- 2012: Me, Myself and Them, a group exhibition on the subject of self-portrait, Künstlerhaus Vienna
- 2012: On Screen - Current Photography from Austria, Fotohof Salzburg
- 2014: Experiment Analog. Photographic manuscripts in the digital age, Künstlerhaus Vienna
- 2015: Rabenmütter, Lentos Art Museum Linz
- 2015 to 2017: Feminist avant-garde of the 1970s. Works from the Verbund collection, Vienna. Hamburger Kunsthalle; The Photographers' Gallery, London; Museum of Modern Art Ludwig Foundation Vienna
- 2018: THE 1990s: Subversive Imaginations, Wien Museum Startgalerie Artothek (MUSA)
- 2018: Women House, National Museum of Women in the Arts (Washington)
- 2020: The Beginning, Art in Austria between 1945 - 1980, Albertina Modern, Vienna
- 2021: Kunstwege '70 Fotografien von Karin Mack, Wien Museum Vienna Austria
- 2021: Solo exhibition, Hinter den Lidern, Leica Gallery, Prague; (Czek Republik)
- 2022: Les Rencontre de la Photographie, Arles Une Avantgarde Feminist

== Awards and honors ==
- 1978 - Walter Buchebner Preis
- 1980 - Arbeitstipendium der Stadt Wien
- 1982 - Römerquelle Kunstwettbewerb – 3. Preis
- 1985 - Staatsstipendium für bildende Kunst
- 2010 - Verleihung des ‘Goldenen Lorbeer’s’ des Künstlerhauses, Wien
- 2013 Würdigungsausstellung der ÖBV, Wien
- 2016 - Prize of the City of Vienna for Fine Arts

== Bibliography ==
- 'Weiße Schatten auf schwarzem Schnee'. Fotogalerie Wien, 1982
- 'Wien als Ausstellung betrachtet, nach Zitaten von James Joyce, Hrsg. Dieter Bandhauer und Otmar Rychlik, Sonderzahl, Wien 1984
- 'Spiegelungen', Denkbilder zur Biographie Brochs; Hrsg. Karin Mack (Bild) und Wolfgang Hofer (Text), Sonderzahl, Wien 1984
- 'Selbstporträts', 1975 – 1985. Sonderzahl, Wien 1985
- 'Kunstwege 70', Sonderzahl, Wien 2007
- ‘Räume des Selbst', Fotohof, Salzburg 2010
- 'Freischwimmen' zur Geschichte der INTAKT, D.E.A. Almhofer&Cie, Wien 2011
- 'Nahe Ferne, ferne Nähe', Fotohof Salzburg, 2014
- 'Wolkenschatten/Dichterlicht' Gedanken zu Geschichte und Landschaft Islands, Verlag der Provinz, 2019
- Margit Zuckriegl: Karin Mack. In the theater of self-events . In: Gabriele Schor (Ed.): Feminist Avantgarde. Art of the 1970s from the Verbund collection, Vienna, Prestel Verlag, Munich 2016, extended edition, ISBN 978-3-7913-5627-3, pp. 123–130

=== Literature ===
Margit Zuckriegl: Karin Mack. In the theater of self-events . In: Gabriele Schor (Ed.): Feminist Avantgarde. Art of the 1970s from the Verbund collection, Vienna, Prestel Verlag, Munich 2016, extended edition, ISBN 978-3-7913-5627-3, pp. 123–130

=== Film ===
- Motion (2012)
- Slow Time (2013)
- By Incident (2013)
- Changing Weather (2015)
