= Bloomfield Collegiate School =

Grammar school for girls in Belfast, Northern Ireland

Coordinates: 54.5941°N 5.8645°W

Information
- Established: 1905; 120 years ago
- Gender: Mixed (1905 - 1915); Girls (1915 - present)
- Houses: Clarke; Curran; Spencer; Walker

Bloomfield Collegiate School is a controlled grammar school for girls in Ballyhackamore in Belfast, Northern Ireland.

== History ==
Bloomfield was founded in 1905, one of a number of private school foundations of that era. It was originally proprietary (owned by the headmistress), co-educational, and accepted boarding students. It discontinued co-education in 1915.

== House system ==
Bloomfield has a house system consisting of four houses named after previous headmistresses: Clarke, Curran, Spencer and Walker. The houses are each represented by four colours: blue (Clarke), red (Curran), green (Spencer), and yellow (Walker).

== Notable former pupils ==
- Grace Bannister, Ulster Unionist politician and first lady Lord Mayor of Belfast, 1 June 1981 – 1 June 1982
- Christine Bleakley, television presenter
- Gemma Garrett, Miss Great Britain 2008
- Thaddea Graham, actress
- Naomi Long, politician in Northern Ireland and leader of the Alliance Party
- Joan Lingard, novelist
- Elaine Shemilt, artist and university professor
