= Elaine Shemilt =

British artist and researcher (born 1954)

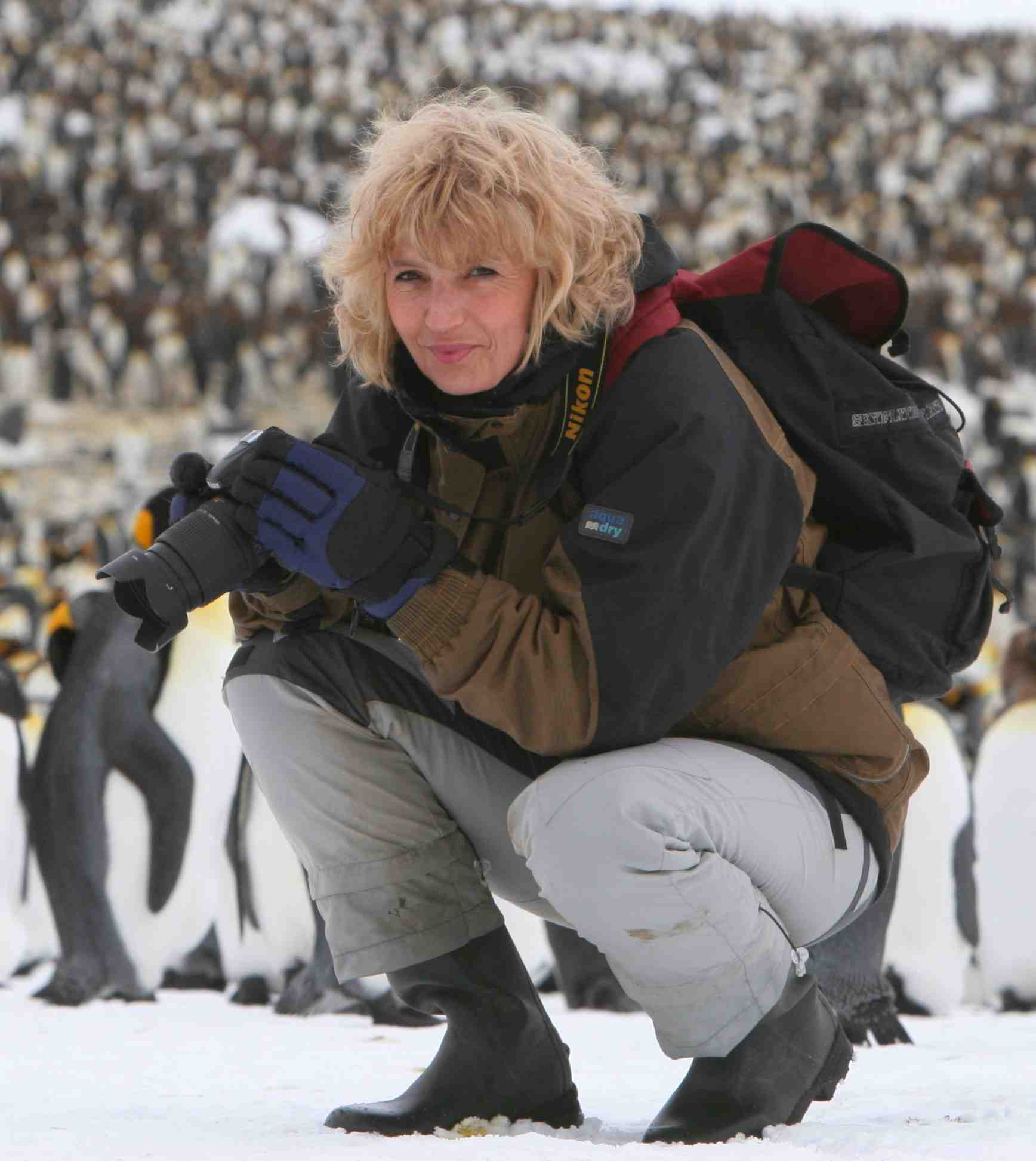
- Shemilt on the Island of South Georgia in 2009
- Born: 7 May 1954 (age 72); Edinburgh, Scotland
- Education: Winchester School of Art, Royal College of Art, London
- Known for: Video art, Photography, Printmaking, Performance Art
- Notable work: Doppelgänger (1979); Quattro Minuti di Mezzogiorno (2010)
- Movement: Video Art, Feminism
- Children: 3, including Genevieve Murphy (composer)

Elaine Shemilt (born 7 May 1954) is a British fine artist, printmaker, and academic researcher. She established the printmaking department at the Duncan of Jordanstone College of Art and Design in 1988, where she remains as a Professor Emerita. Alongside her traditional print media work, her work spans a wide variety of disciplines.

== Biography ==
Between 1960 and 1972, Shemilt grew up in Craigavad, County Down in Northern Ireland. She attended non-denominational Bloomfield Collegiate School and Victoria College, Belfast during The Troubles where her experiences motivated her to develop the themes of conflict, censorship and psychological constraint in her work.

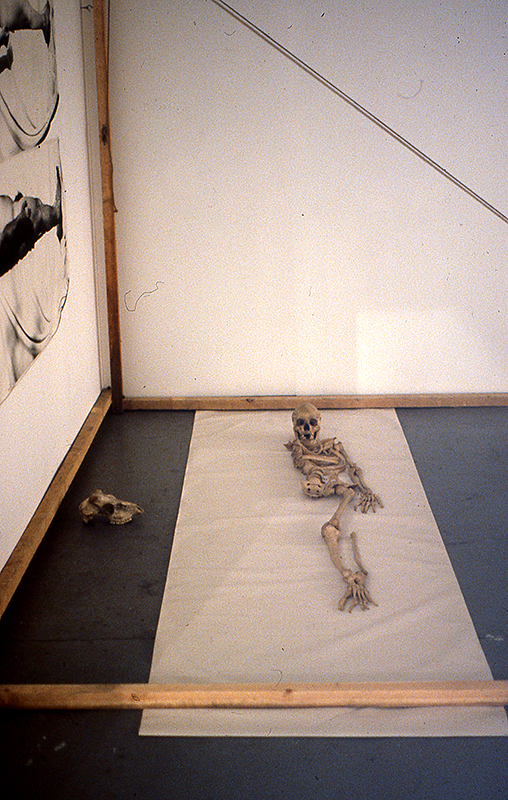
Shemilt’s installation, Ancient Death Ritual was selected by Helen Chadwick for the Hayward Biennale of 1979

Shemilt is a graduate of the Winchester School of Art and the Royal College of Art. From 1980–1982 she was one of the first Artists in Residence at the South Hill Park Arts Centre. She has exhibited internationally including in Switzerland, Denmark, the Netherlands, Canada, USA, Australia, Italy and Germany. In Britain she has exhibited at the Hayward Gallery and the Institute of Contemporary Arts in London and at the Edinburgh Festival. She was a pioneer of early feminist video and multi-media installation work alongside her fellow artist and friend Helen Chadwick, who selected her for the Hayward Annual in 1979. Of her early video works, only two have survived: Doppelgänger (1979), and Women Soldiers (1984), which were recovered and remastered by the REWIND video art project in 2011.

Shemilt established the printmaking department of the School of Fine Art, Duncan of Jordanstone College of Art and Design (University of Dundee) in 1988 and was course director of printmaking from 1988–2001 and Chair of Printmaking from 2001–2021. She is retired from academia but remains Professor Emerita of fine art printmaking and a professional member and former President of the Society of Scottish Artists and was its president from March 2007 until 2010. Shemilt was elected a Fellow of the Royal Society of Arts in 2000 and of the Royal Geographical Society in 2009. She has collaborated with the video artist Stephen Partridge on several installations, including "Rush", first exhibited at London's Fieldgate Gallery, and "Quattro Minuti di Mezzogiorno", a HiDefinition video installation, exhibited in Italy in December 2010 – January 2011.

=== South Georgia ===
In 2002 she was made a Shackleton Scholar and was awarded a Carnegie Scholarship. She is a trustee and vice chair (2002–2020) of the South Georgia Heritage Trust established to promote the environmental protection and habitat restoration of South Georgia Island, a natural wilderness in the Southern Atlantic. In 1998 Shemilt was invited to lead a project to improve the environment of the military base on the Falkland Isles by the then commander, Brigadier David Nicholls. The experiences of the staff and student team she put together led inevitably, to independent artworks by all. Four years later in 2002 this led to the exhibition, Traces of Conflict, The Falklands Revisited 1982–2002 at the Imperial War Museum. Shemilt's work in this exhibition was inspired by the abandoned field hospital at Ajax Bay, and according to the Imperial War Museum Keeper Angela Weight, Shemilt "was gripped by the aura of a place where the writ of war did not run and young men were tended irrespective of whether they were friend or foe." In 2011 she produced a series of Screenprints and laser cut embossed prints and a suite of these were acquired by the National Museum of Northern Ireland for their permanent collection in 2020. These were featured in a BBC4 programme Inside Museums, (episode 3) on the Ulster Museum in Belfast, broadcast on the 13th Oct 2020 at 7pm. The programme was presented and written by Emma Dabiri, who wrote:

“The final work I want to show you is also by a woman – though this one, interestingly, does the reverse, imploring us NOT to travel. Elaine Shemilt is a contemporary artist, whose practice in recent years has turned more and more to environment activism. This print is an outline of the Island of South Georgia. Situated on the edge of the Antarctic South Georgia is a place loaded with significance. It was once a base for seven whaling stations, home to a grisly orgy of blood and blubber, synonymous with the destruction of the natural world. But in recent years the island has become a bellwether for environmentalists. A barometer for the effects of climate change. Shemilt invites us to look at this simple beautiful object – an embossed line on card and engage with a terrifying idea… that unless things change, unless we change, there will be fewer places for us to travel to at all. It demonstrates one of the most profound ways in which our world has changed. All that exploration, and the exploitation of the world’s resources, has created a world in which we need to travel less. Even after a lockdown, where the skies were empty of planes for weeks, we cannot afford to become complacent."

=== Art and science ===
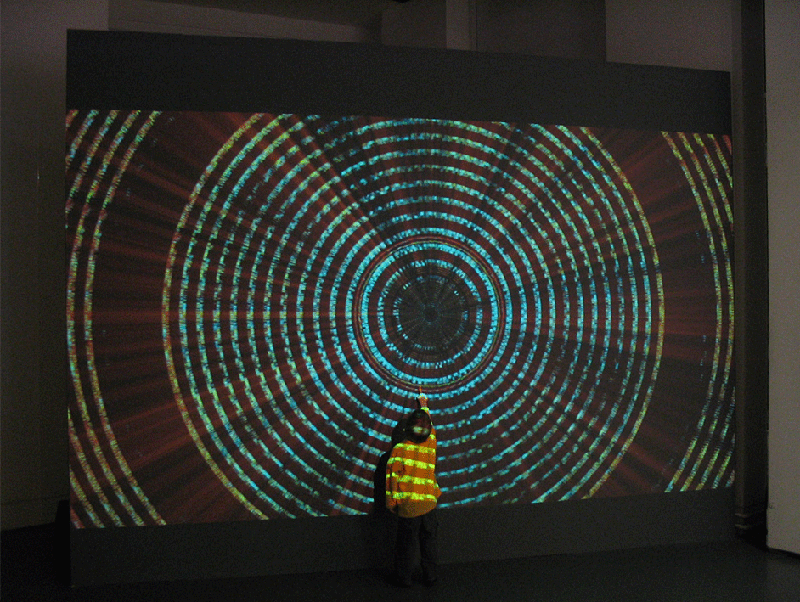
A Blueprint for Bacterial Life – HiDef video digital installation at DCA, Dundee, 2006.

An important strand of her work involves collaboration between art and science. Her work with the Genome Diagram developed by Dr Ian Toth and Dr Leighton Pritchard at the Scottish Crop Research Institute resulted in a portfolio of work including installations, digital animation, prints and music.

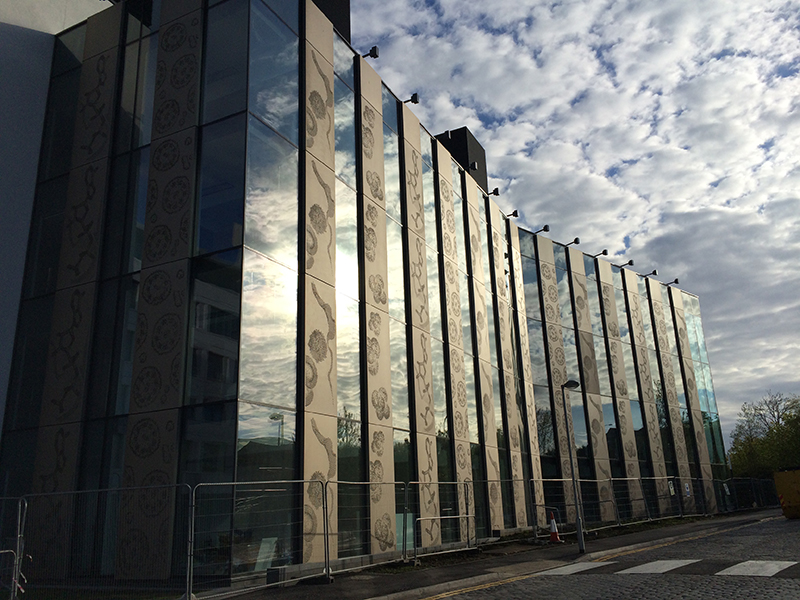
Scales of Life installation shot of the panels on the CTIR Building, 2013.

In 2013 Shemilt completed a major SciArt commission for the University of Dundee College of Life Science's new Centre for Translational & Interdisciplinary Research building: The Scales of Life which embodies science and the visualisation process. She collaborated with the Regius Professor Michael Ferguson and the architect Jo White. On three facades of the CTIR building, 16 columns of large metal cladding panels incorporate her artistic abstractions which represent the four key scales of life: Molecular, Organellar, Cellular and Tissue. The cladding panels (1.5m wide x 3.6m high) are made from a high quality anodised aluminium and are arranged vertically into groups of four panels. The panels address the essence of the four main scales of life and the intangibility of their size and dimensions. The visual abstractions reflect both an interpretive aesthetic approach, and the need to retain scientific recognition and accuracy. The main objective of the work is that the series of images reflect in a meaningful way the scientific research being undertaken within the CTIR building. The CTIR was officially opened by Sir Paul Nurse on 1 October 2014.

=== Research ===
In 2013 she was awarded a Royal Society of Edinburgh Caledonian European Research Fellowship to study and research in Italy, and was chair of the international printmaking conference IMPACT 8 held in Dundee in August.

In 2014 she was awarded £234,872 from the Arts and Humanities Research Council to act as principal investigator on the research project European Women's video art in the 70s and 80s (EWVA). A publication associated with the project was published in May 2019.

Starting in March 2018 she started work as principal investigator on another AHRC-funded research project (£215,602), Richard Demarco, the Italian Connection | Exchanges between Scotland and Italy through Richard Demarco in the European context – a study on the eponymous artist, animateur, gallerist, and promoter of the visual and performing arts. A major publication is the main outcome of the research published in late 2022 by John Libbey Publishing.

== Exhibitions ==
Interest in Shemilt's early video and performance work has grown during the early 21st century. For example, the exhibition, SHE DEVIL 8, in Rome in 2016 was described:

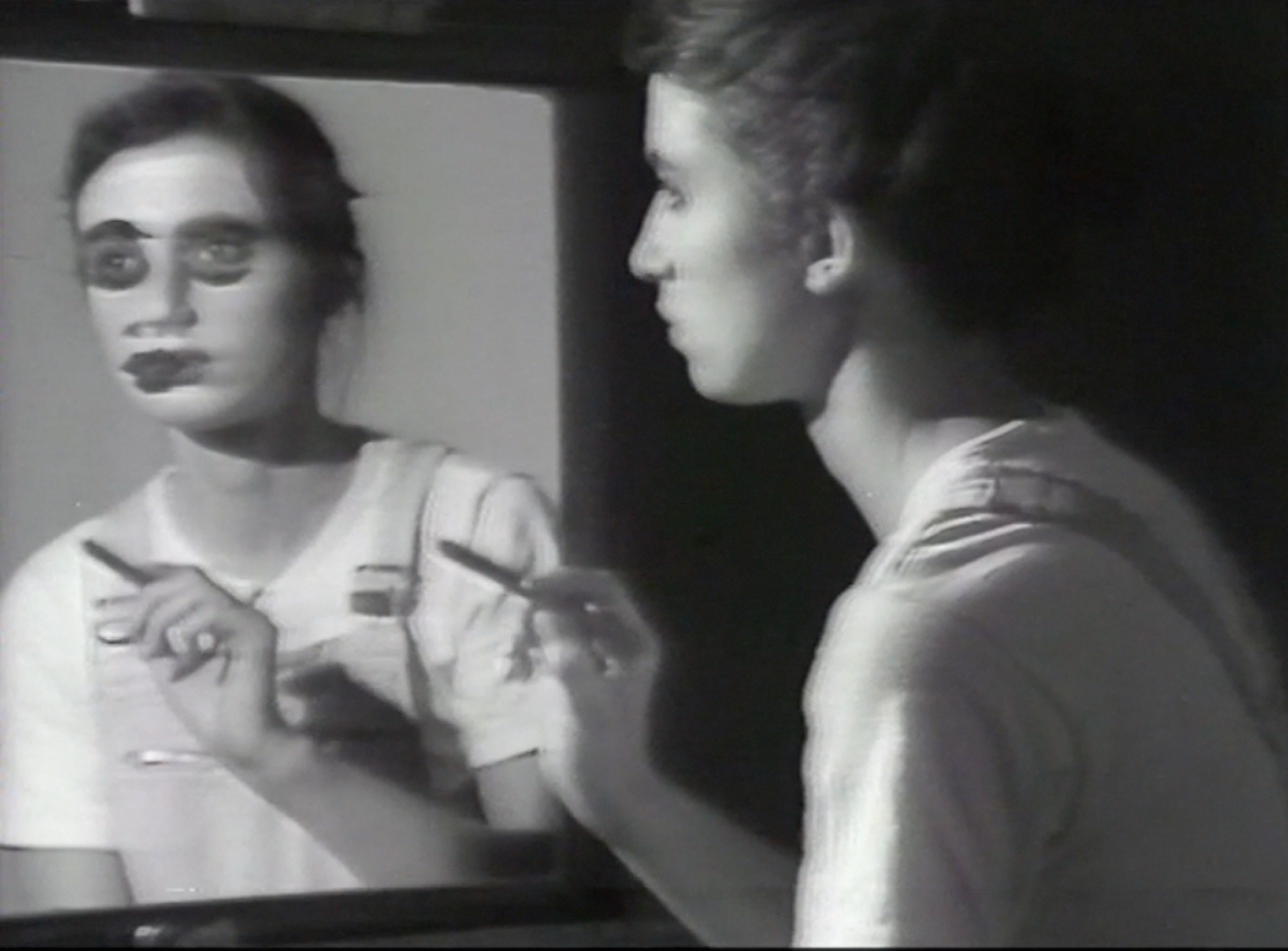
Still from Doppelgänger, video work 1979

"The godmother of SHE DEVIL 8 is Elaine Shemilt with the video performance Doppelgänger. The work is part of a series of video experiments by women artists in the 1970s and 1980s, rediscovered and digitally remastered by the research project REWIND,.... Doppelgänger is one of two still existing videos of a series begun by Shemilt in 1974, salvaged in 2011. The term doppelgänger is used in German culture to indicate the evil twin (doppel / double, and gänger / goer). The doppelgänger of Elaine Shemilt is utterly feminine. The artist puts on makeup in front of the mirror in a ritual divided between the face and its reflected image that generates the double, the absolute protagonist of the finale."

In 2019 she and artist Federica Marangoni collaborated on Parallel Dialogues Through Video and Time at Casa di Carlo Goldoni, Venice. The exhibition, curated by Laura Leuzzi and Iliyana Nedkova with Adam Lockhart, was planned to tour to Scotland in 2020, but cancelled due to Covid. Articles, Exhibitions and Journal Papers reflect the renewed interest in Shemilt's works.

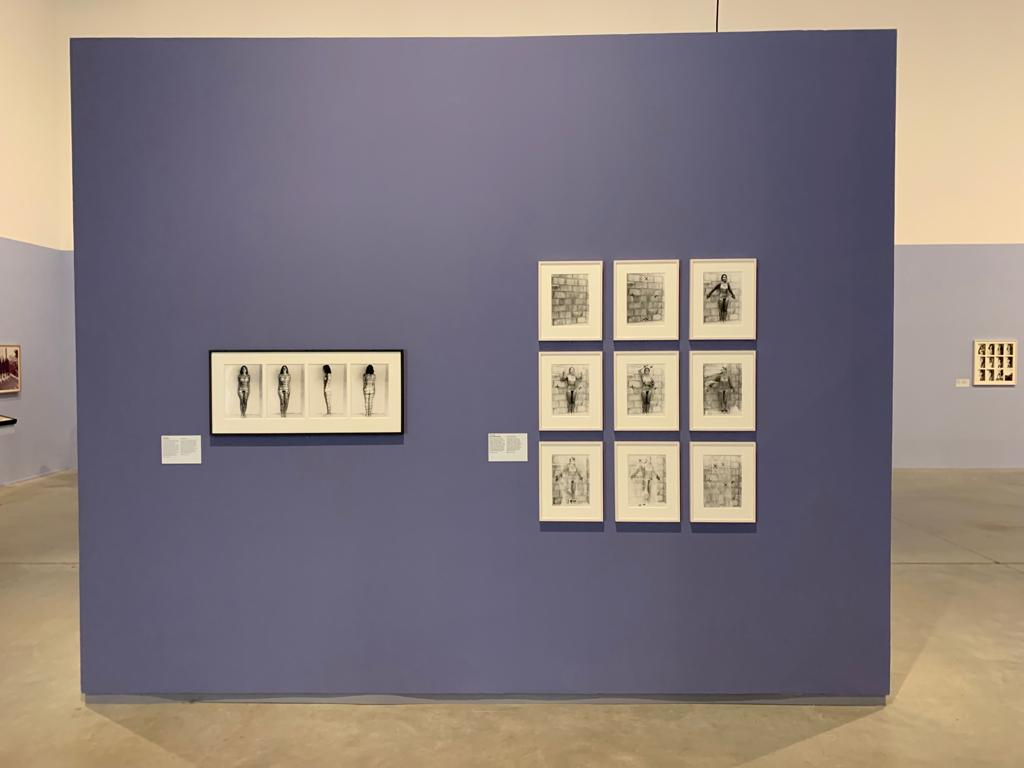
Works installed at Feminist Avant-Garde, Arles, France

Shemilt was featured in Gabriel Schor's book, The Feminist Avant Garde, Art from the 1970s in 2016 and 2nd Edition in 2022. In 2018. several of her works from the 1970s were acquired by the SAMMLUNG VERBUND art collection in Vienna, and her work is in a touring exhibition, The Feminist avantgarde of the 1970s (+ various titles), showing in Stavanger (Norway 2018), Brno (Czech Republic 2019), Barcelona (Spain 2020), Lentos Kunstmuseum Linz (Austria), New York City (2020 – postponed due to COVID), and in the Feminist Avant-Garde, Exhibition within Les Rencontres de la Photographie d’Arles Photographic Festival, Arles (France) July 4–25 September 2022. In November she was an exhibitor and guest at the festival, About The Future, at Palazzo GIL, Campobasso, Molise Culture Foundation, Italy.

== Academic works ==
- "A Blueprint for Bacterial Life; Can A Science-art Fusion Move the Boundaries of Visual and Audio Interpretation?", pp. 23–32. In Digital Visual Culture: Theory and Practice, Computers and the History of Art, Editors A. Bentkowska-Kafel, T. Cashen, H. Gardiner, Bristol: Intellect, 2006 ISBN 978-1-84150-248-9
- Limited Edition – Unlimited Image: Can a Science/Art Fusion Move the Boundaries of Visual and Audio Interpretation?, AHRC ICT Methods Network Volume Art Practice in a Digital Culture, Charlie Gere (Ed), Routledge, 2010. 14pp
- European Women's Video Art in the 70s and 80s, Leuzzi. L, Shemilt. E, Partridge. S (Eds). John Libbey Publishing, 2019. The book is the main output of the AHRC-funded EWVA research project, and was launched at Tate Modern on 24 September 2019.
- The Scales of Life: A case study on an Art-Science Visualisation, Electronic Visualisation and the Arts (EVA 2015), London, 2015.
- Richard Demarco, the Italian Connection, Leuzzi. L, Shemilt. E, Partridge. S (Eds). John Libbey Publishing, John Libbey Publishing, 2022.

== Works in collections ==
- Image in a Bell Jar, 1994, The Harry and Margery Boswell Art Collection, University of St Andrews
- Ajax Bay, 1999, FINEART.AC.UK Collection
- South Georgia Whaling Stations
- Doppelgänger, 1979, REWIND Collection REWIND
- Several works from the 1970s, acquired 2018 by SAMMLUNG VERBUND: The VERBUND art collection in Vienna.
- A series of embossed prints about South Georgia, were acquired in 2020 by the National Museums of Northern Ireland, Belfast

== Selected works ==
- I'm dead, 1975
- Art into protest, 1975
- Ancient Death Rituals, 1979
- Bullets & Lipstick, 1981
- Doppelganger, 1979–1981
- Momento Mori, 1996
- Chimera, 1998–99
- Legacy, 2004
- Rush, 2007
- The Dry Valley, 2010
- Quattro minuti di mezzorgiorno, 2011
