= Lotte Profohs =

Austrian painter and graphic designer (1934–2012)

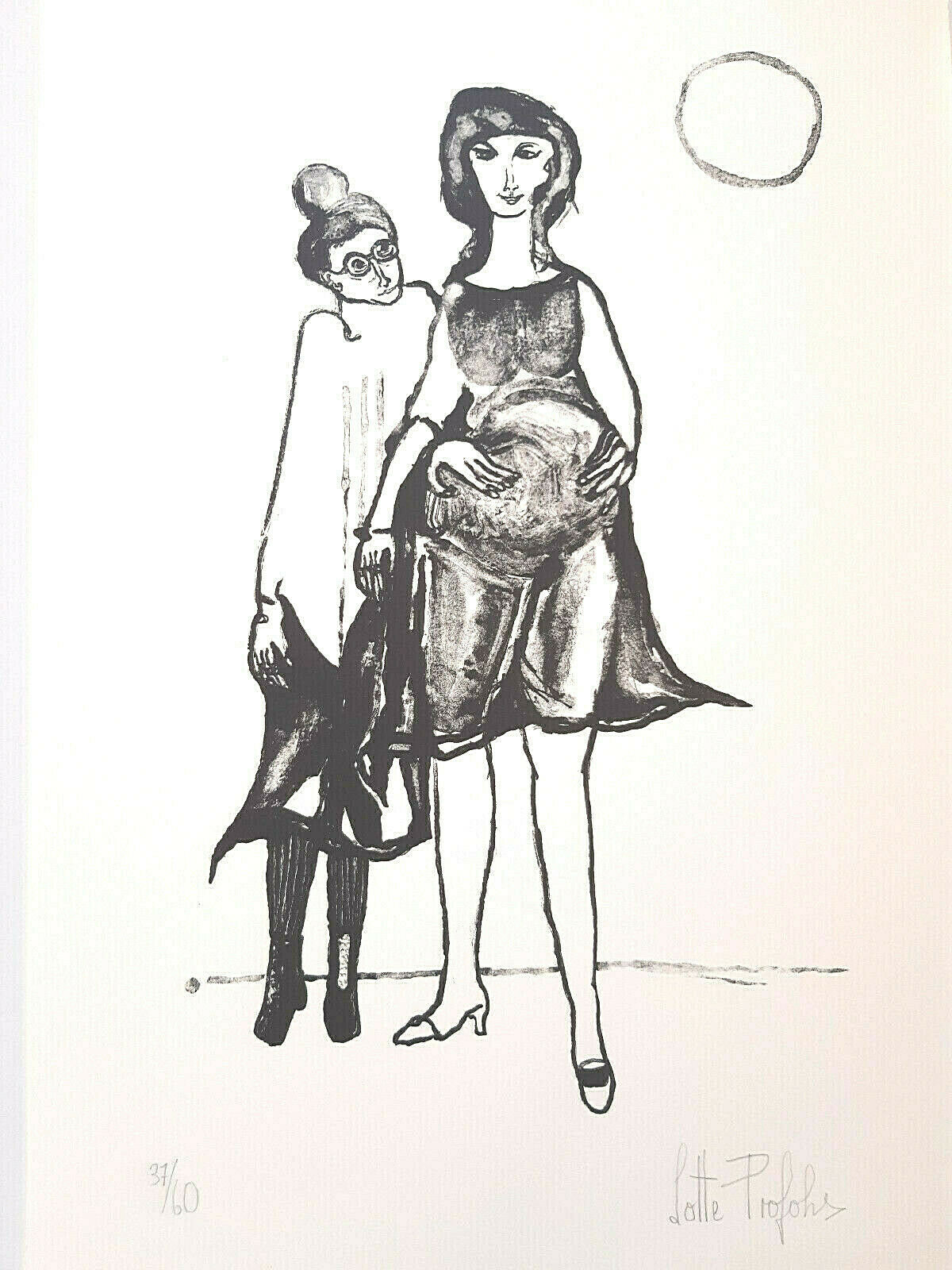
Human and inhuman encounters Pregnant women

Lotte Profohs (16 November 1934 – 6 November 2012), also Lotte Profohs-Leherb, was an Austrian graphic artist and painter who was close to Expressionism.

== Biography ==
Lotte Profohs was born on 16 November 1934 in Vienna as Li(e)selotte Cäcilie Profoh. She was the youngest child of Hermine Stephanie Heller (1897–1975) and Leopold Ferdinand Profohs (1895–1985). The latter was a k.u.k.(Royal-hatter; his father and grandfather already practiced this profession. Leopold Ferdinand and Hermine Stephanie Profohs both came from Vienna Austria, where Lotte Profohs and her siblings grew up in the 2nd and 3rd district. From the third grade of primary school until her graduation Lotte Profohs attended Sacré Coeur am Rennweg in the 3rd district. Her brother Leopold (1921-1940) served in the infantry in the Second World War and was killed two years after the war began. Her sister Emilie (* 1926) now lives in Bordeaux, France.

Profohs studied at the Academy of Applied Arts from 1949 at the age of 15, where she also met her husband Helmut Leherbauer (Maître) Leherb. The two attended classes together at the academy and in 1955 they transferred together to the Academy of Fine Arts at Schillerplatz. In December 1955 they married in the Rochuskirche in Vienna's 3rd district. Their witnesses were the sculptor Trude Fronius and Franz Seipert. On 24 May 1960, Anselm Daniel Leherb (d. 11 July 2001) was born, her only child. She has only one granddaughter, Angela.

Lotte Profohs died on 6 November 2012 in Vienna. She was buried in the Vienna Central Cemetery.

In 2018, the Lotte-Profohs-Weg was named after her in Vienna-Donaustadt (22nd district)

== Early life and career ==
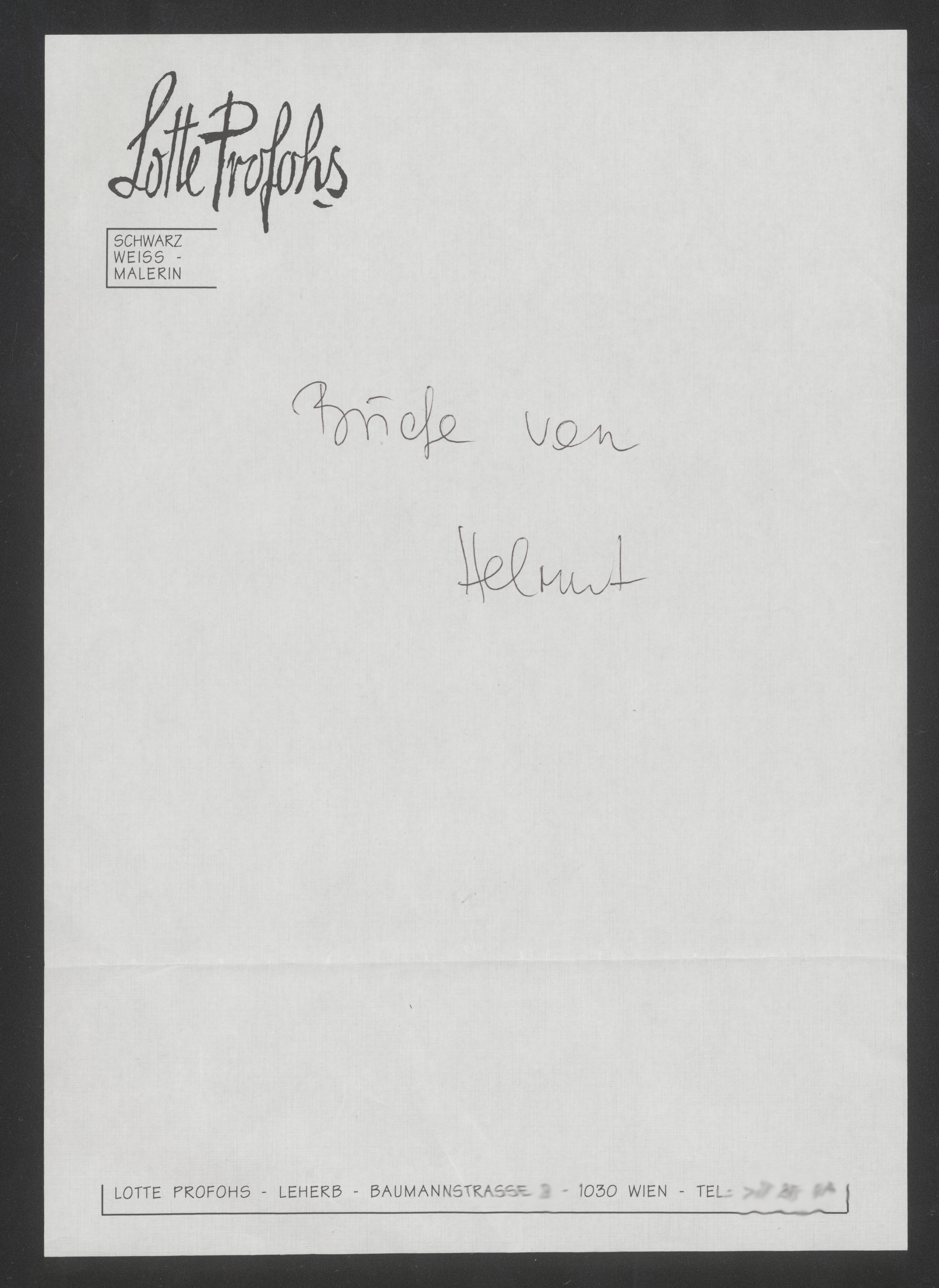
Letterhead Lotte Profohs (Black and white painter)

Lotte Profohs was born in Vienna (Austria). In 1964 Profohs and her husband Leherb moved to Paris (France) and moved with her husband to Amsterdam. I and later Italy. Profohs created countless works, most of which have a socially critical background. Women play a central role in most of her work. The paintings are characterised by her black and white style, she rarely used colour in her paintings. On her stationery letterhead, she has pre-printed: "Lotte Profohs, Schwarz/Weiß-Malerin” (black and white painter)

Profohs supported her husband Helmut Leherb in his artwork and she is seen as a model and inspiration in much of his work. Profohs was internationally recognised as a graphic artist and painter in the early 1950s. Her work is in possession of representative state and private collections in Europe and the USA including the Austrian Gallery Vienna-Belvedere, the Graphische Sammlung Albertina, the Kunsthalle Düsseldorf, Graphic Collection of the Louvre Paris and the Museum of Modern Art in Philadelphia. E. C. Johnson Collections Boston.

In 1958, at the age of 24, The Louvre in Paris bought ink drawings from Lotte Profohs. This series was artistically dedicated to the discrimination of women. Furthermore, she was very concerned about people on the outer margins of society and feminist themes, and this can be seen in most of her paintings.

Since 2020, Profohs’ work has also been included in the collection From Verbund AG of the Association of the Feminist Avant-Garde.

== Important topics in the work of Lotte Profohs ==
Profohs dealt with socially critical themes since her youth, which are strongly reflected in her work. She touched above all on topics that were neither contemporary nor socially acceptable. The woman on the margins of society, the single mother, prostitution, sexuality, homosexuality, BDSM themes and aging became central components of her work. Not only the preoccupation with these themes, but also the preoccupation from her position as a woman in male-dominated art were noteworthy.

=== Have mercy on women ===
In 1957, Lotte Profohs read the first German edition of the novel "Pitié pour les Femmes" by Henry de Montherlant (1895-1972). Published under the title "Mercy on Women", after the birth of her son Anselm Daniel, she produced approximately 200 drawings on this theme in 1960 and 1961. They are understood to exist as a certain response to the novel, but the cycle was slightly renamed. The "Have mercy on women" finally became an appeal: "Have mercy on women"! The book, with an edition of 2500 copies was deliberately designed to be very simple with the purpose not to distract attention from the pictures and their message. Another 25 prints were exhibited in 1962 in the exhibition of the same name at the Kunsthalle Düsseldorf. Although women's themes were not particularly in demand at the time, Lotte Profohs' cycle was very well received.

Abandoned and lonely people were faded out by society and were partly not visible at all. Nevertheless, or precisely because of this Profohs devoted herself to this theme. Profohs made women visible in their hardships and in their existence. Her drawings were created without preliminary sketches; not even the subject was planned. After studying in detail the technical application of East Asian ink painting, she painted most of her prints with Chinese ink on Ingres paper.

=== The horror of passion ===
Profohs accepted the offer to illustrate two short stories by Edgar Allan Poe. The book "Schrecken der Leidenschaft" with the appropriate subtitle "Für Furchtsame & Tapfere" was published in 1973 in the series "Bücher aus der Schatztruhe" by Kremayr & Scheriau in Vienna. The cycle illustrated in "Schrecken der Leidenschaft" was called "Die arabesken Träumungen geliebter Gesichter" by the publisher and consists of twelve sheets.

=== Emigrants of the time ===
Profohs had her last solo exhibition at the Austrian Postal Savings Bank in 1989. Her style changed slowly and gradually; in the cycle "Emigrants of Time", which was shown from 7 November 1989, there is a clear change in style. Lotte Profohs also dealt with the subject of emigration before 1989 and began drawing displaced persons years before this exhibition. Her works depict her own dialogue with the people. However, Lotte Profohs understood emigration not only as a change of place, but also as an inner departure.

In 2000 Telekom Austria printed one of Lotte Profohs’ paintings on one of their prepaid telephone cards.

== Exhibitions ==
- 1956 Cycle Wiener Veduten commissioned by the E. Carl Johnson Collections, Boston, USA; Vienna room exhibition "Die kleine Traurigkeit";
- 1956 Wolfrum Gallery in Palais Lobkowitz,
- 1958 exhibition Andre Weit Gallery;
- 1958 Paris, participation in the Greuchen Graphic Triennial,
- 1958 permanently in Paris with large-format graphics;
- 1959 exhibition Willy Verkauf Gallery,
- Vienna, exhibition "Zeitgenössische Graphik der Gegenwart", K. Collective Gallery Riehentor, Basel,
- Gallery Guiot, Paris,
- International Graphic Exhibition Johannesburg
- 1962 exhibition at the Düsseldorf Kunsthalle
- 2019 Feminist Avant-Garde from the Sammlung Verbund
