= Florentina Pakosta =

Austrian painter and graphic artist (born 1933)

Florentina Pakosta (born 1 October 1933, in Vienna) is an Austrian painter and graphic artist of the Vienna Secession art movement, who has exhibited at the Albertina, the Leopold Museum, the Österreichische Galerie Belvedere, and the Sprengel Museum. A winner of the 2023 Austrian Art Prize for Fine Arts, she is a graduate of the Academy of Fine Arts Vienna.

== Selected works ==
- Pakosta, Florentina (2013). Florentina Pakosta: Malerei seit 1989 - Trikolore-Bilder ; paintings since 1989 - tricolour paintings. Leykam. ISBN 978-3-7011-7862-9.
- Pakosta, Florentina; Schröder, Klaus Albrecht (2003). Florentina Pakosta (in German). Albertina.
