= Annegret Soltau =

German visual artist (born 1946)

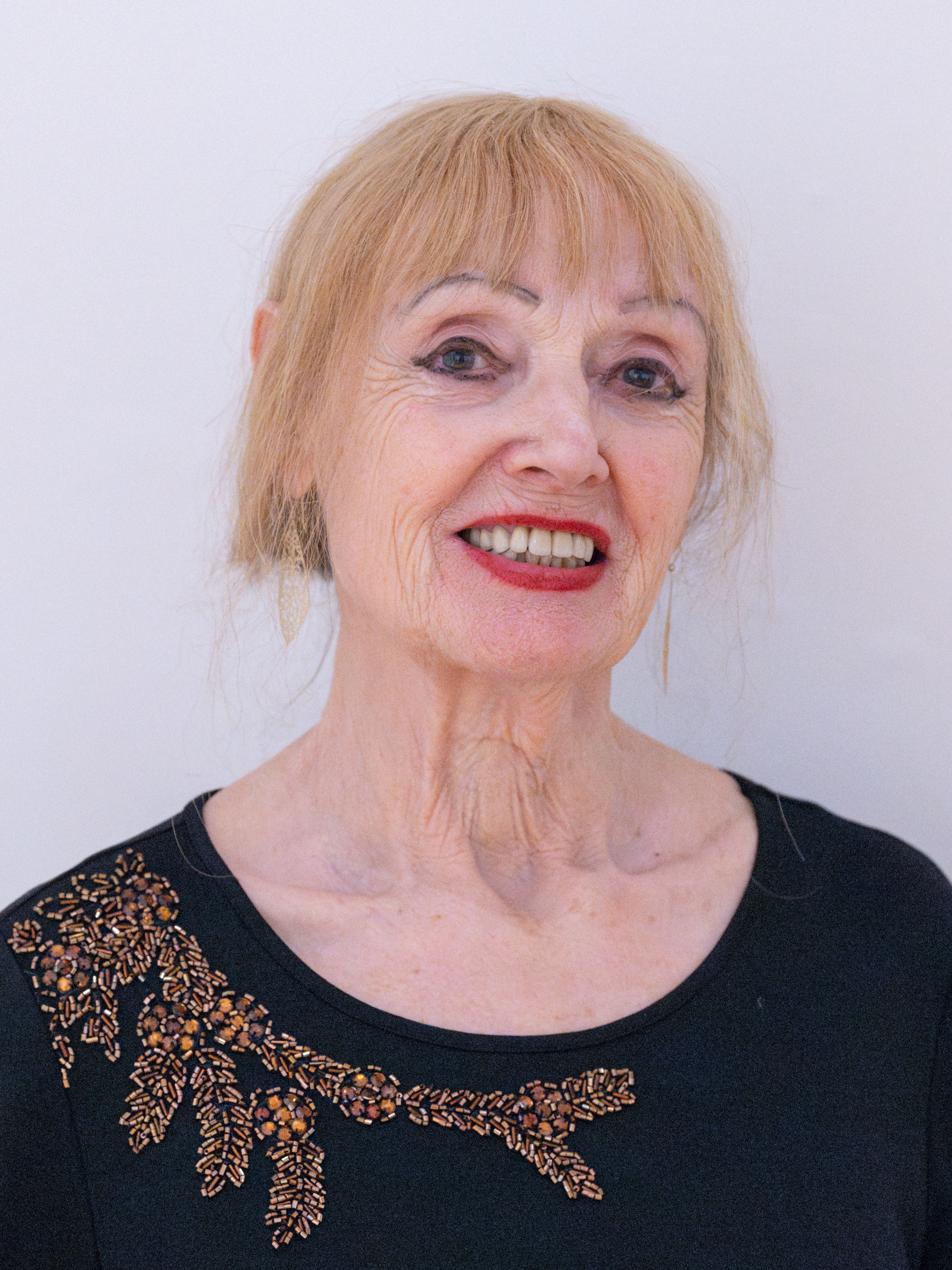
Annegret Soltau in 2026

Annegret Soltau (born 16 January 1946) is a German visual artist, born in Lüneburg.

A prominent artist of the 1970s and 1980s, her most well-known works are photomontages of bodies and faces (often her own) sewn over or collaged with black sewing thread.

== Education ==
From 1967 to 1972 she studied with Hans Thiemann, Kurt Kranz, Rudolf Hausner and David Hockney at the Academy of Fine Arts Hamburg in Germany, and then in 1972 at the Academy of Fine Arts Vienna in Austria. In 1973 she received a DAAD scholarship for Milan in Italy.

== Life and work ==
Since 1973 Soltau has freelanced, first in the sphere of painting and graphic art, then from 1975 actions ("Permanente Demonstration"), photography and videoworks. In Soltau's own words, "Permanente Demonstration" is "an attempt to trigger states of consciousness through realization of an image in real life, i.e. make an image physically. The line, becomes a realized line, the person is part of the picture. Line and person are not two opposite things but one reality".

In "Selbst", the artist ties up her face with tight threads of black silk, like a cocoon, of which she makes a photographic record that is subsequently stitched by following a geometric pattern that resembles a sign. The result is a self-harming self-portrait, an effigy that has been prevented, inhibited, forced into silence. Annegret Soltau writes her story as a woman on the blank page of her face; it is a history of conflict, impulsive reactions to the family environment, to the marginal position of women in the social context, to gender pressures and discrimination. As it cuts into the sensitive skin of her face, the thread distorts its shape but also enhances its beauty.

In her Video-Performances and Phototableaus she wanted to make intimate processes like sexuality, pregnancy, birth, abortion, sickness and violence become subjects of the arts. From 1977 to 1980 she dealt with her pregnancies and the birth of her two children. In the video "being pregnant" she observed her own body over the whole time period of nine months. She pointed out physical changes as well as psychological ones. The artist called the phases: panic, doubt, hope, loneliness, separation, oppression, reminiscence, oration, being-born. She asked herself the question: how can I combine creativity and motherhood without losing myself as my own person.

The most complex and elaborate series of works is "generativ" (1994-2005), where she composes photographs of the naked bodies of her "female chain": her grandmother, her mother, her daughter and herself. "Generativ" shows the whole span of bodily change between young and old, between the fading body of age and the emerging body in puberty. "My main interest is the integration of body process in my work, in order to connect body and spirit as equal parts" (Annegret Soltau)

Over the years, her face has transformed metaphorically into letters, numbers, data and paper documents (identity cards, passports, bank statements, cash machine receipts, dentist's bills).

== Honours ==
In 1982 she was awarded a working scholarship by the Arts Society of Bonn, in 1986/87 the Villa Massimo prize in Rome in Italy, in 1998 the Maria Sybilla Merian Prize (in the State of Hesse) "Vita" Annegret Soltau and in 2000 the Wilhelm-Loth-prize of the City of Darmstadt, where she is living.

== Exhibitions ==
A retrospective exhibition of Soltau's work was shown at the exhibition halls of Mathildenhöhe Darmstadt in spring 2006.

"More than Meets the Eye", Art Photography from the Deutsche Bank Collection on Tour through important Museums Latin America from 2006 until 2007 (Monterrey, Mexico City, Bogota, Lima, Santiago de Chile, São Paulo und Buenos Aires)

2007 until 2009 WACK! Art and the Feminist Revolution, The Museum of Contemporary Art, Los Angeles, National Museum of Women in the Arts, Washington, P.S.1 Contemporary Art Center, New York and Vancouver Art Gallery in Canada.

2010 "Donna: Avanguardia femminista negli anni '70", Galleria Nazionale d'Arte Moderna, Rome, Italy

2012 "Francis Bacon and the Existencial Condition in Contemporary Art", Strozzina Foundazione, Palazzo Strozzi, Firenze, Italy

"artevida: corpo(body)", 28 June – 21 September 2014, curated by Adriano Pedrosa and Rodigo Maura at Fundação Casa França-Brasil, Rio de Janeiro, Brazil

2013 until 2017 "WOMAN. Feminist Avant-Garde of the 1970s. Works from the SAMMLUNG VERBUND", Vienna (touring exhibition): "MUJER. La vanguardia feminista de los años 70". Círculo de Bellas Artes, Madrid, Spain, "WOMAN" Palais des Beaux-Arts, Brussels, Belgium, Mjellby Art Museum, Halmstad, Sweden, Hamburger Kunsthalle, Hamburg, Germany and MUMOK. Museum moderner Kunst, Stiftung Ludwig, Vienna

2015 "GENDER IN ART", Museum of Contemporary Art (MOCAK), Kraków, PL

"PRIÈRE DE TOUCHER – The Touch of Art", 12 February until 16 May 2016, Museum Tinguely, Basel, Switzerland Medicine in Art

"MEDIZINE IN ART", 22.04.2016 - 02.10.2016, Museum of Contemporary Art (MOCAK), Kraków, PL

"FEMINIST AVANT-GARDE OF THE 1970S". Works from the VERBUND Collection, Vienna, curated by Gabriele Schor and Anna Dannemann. The show is taking place at the Photographers' Gallery in London from October 6, 2016 – January 29, 2017

"AGING PRIDE", 17.11.2017 - 11.03.2018 Belvedere museum, Vienna, Austria

"Family Matters", 04.10.2019 - 30.08.2020 Dom Museum Wien, Vienna, Austria

== Bibliography ==
- Heather Hanna: Woman Fraiming Hair: Serial Strategies in Contemporary Art, Cambridge Scholars Publishing 2015, ISBN 978-1-4438-7607-0
- Annegret Soltau: ich selbst - myself, Justus-Liebig-Verlag 2015 (German/English), ISBN 978-3-87390-355-5
- Gabriele Schor: Feminist Avantgarde - Art of the 1970s, Prestel 2016, ISBN 978-3-7913-5446-0*
- Baldur Greiner: Annegret Soltau: I was on a quest, Lavishly illustrated biography in English, hardcover, 116 pages, Weststadt Verlag 2018, ISBN 978-3-940179-34-0
