= Rita Myers =

American artist (born 1947)

Rita Myers (born 1947) is an American video installation artist. Her work is held in the collection of the Museum of Modern Art in New York.

== Early life and education ==
Myers was born in Hammonton, New Jersey,. and attended Saint Joseph High School in her hometown. She received a B.A. from Douglass College, Rutgers University, New Jersey and an M.A. from Hunter College, New York.

== Work ==
Shauna Snow writing in the Los Angeles Times described Myers' "Rift Rise" as "a meditation upon destructive force that incorporates video monitors, music, live trees and mixed media constructions into a confrontation of landscapes". Cathy Curtis in the same newspaper added that "images of destruction (fire, charred tree branches) and renewal (rushing water, green leaves) play on both sides of opposing banks of monitors, one made of sharp-edged black slabs, the other covered with live birch trees. At once very simple and very grand in scope, the installation offers a five-minute meditation on the cycle of life."

Also in the Los Angeles Times, "The Allure of the Concentric" was described as having "four monitors amid large volcanic rocks show close-up views of leaves and weeds, dry cracked ground and the silhouette of stark tree trunks against sky." Curtis described it as a room-size installation where the viewer enters "through a metal gate that is left ajar. Landscape imagery plays on six video monitors set on arrangements of rocks on either side of the room. At the far end of the gallery, three tall aluminum mesh “castles” huddle together. In the center of the room, three dead dogwood trees overhang a pool of water."

Helen A. Harrison in The New York Times described "In the Planet of the Eye" as "a severe structure of Gothic arched steel, metal and wire mesh frames two distorted chairs. Slits of natural light provide restricted illumination, and attention is focused on a video monitor, suspended from the ceiling, on which a spinning gyroscope is juxtaposed with revolving views of a desert landscape."

== Publications ==
=== Publications by Myers ===
- Rita Myers, Rift rise: September 26–November 7, 1987. New York: The Alternative Museum, 1987. ISBN 9780932075161.
- Water moves. New York: Macmillan McGraw-Hill. ISBN 9780022810863.

=== Publications with contributions by Myers ===
- C. 7,500. Valencia, CA: California Institute of the Arts, 1973. OCLC 1242941336.
- American Landscape Video: The Electronic Grove. Featuring works by Dara Birnbaum, Frank Gillette, Doug Hall, Mary Lucier, Rita Myers, Steina Vasulka, Bill Viola. Pittsburgh, PA: Carnegie Museum of Art, 1988.

== Exhibitions ==
=== Solo exhibitions ===
- Rita Myers: Phantom Cities, University Museum of Contemporary Art, University of Massachusetts Amherst, Amherst, MA, 1990

=== Group exhibitions ===
- Whitney Biennial, 1979. Curated by John G. Hanhardt, Barbara Haskell, Richard Marshall, Mark Segal, and Patterson Sims.
- Video and Ritual, Museum of Modern Art, New York, 1984
- Preparation and Proposition, Islip Art Museum, East Islip, New York, 1984. Curated by Madeleine Burnside. Includes part of Myers' "In the Planet of the Eye".
- American Landscape Video: The Electronic Grove, Carnegie Museum of Art, Pittsburgh, Pennsylvania, 1988. Curated by William D. Judson. Included Myers' "The Allure of the Concentric". Travelled to Newport Harbor Art Museum, Costa Mesa, California, 1989. Myers' contribution was switched to "Rift Rise".
- Continuum and the Moment, Fullerton Art Gallery, California State University, Fullerton, 1989. With Bill Viola and Hiroshi Sugimoto. Included Myers' "The Allure of the Concentric".
- Feminist Avant-Garde of the 1970s, Hamburger Kunsthalle, Hamburg, Germany, 2015; ZKM Center for Art and Media Karlsruhe, Karlsruhe, Germany, 2017/18; The Photographers' Gallery, London, 2016/17

== Collections ==
Myers' work is held in the following permanent collection:

- Carnegie Museum of Art, Pittsburgh, Pennsylvania: various materials (as of 5 January 2023)
- Museum of Modern Art, New York: 1 video (as of 5 January 2023)

== See also ==
- Feminist avantgarde
