= Birgit Jürgenssen =

Austrian artist (1949–2003)

- Birgit Jürgenssen
- Born: 1949; Vienna, Austria
- Died: 2003 (aged 53–54); Vienna, Austria
- Education: University of Applied Arts Vienna
- Occupations: Photography, painting, graphic art, curator and teacher
- Website: birgitjuergenssen.com

Birgit Jürgenssen (1949 – 2003) was an Austrian photographer, painter, graphic artist, curator and teacher who specialized in feminine body art with self-portraits and photo series, which have revealed a sequence of events related to the daily social life of a woman in its various forms including an atmosphere of shocking fear and common prejudices. She was acclaimed as one of the "outstanding international representatives of the feminist avant-garde". She lived in Vienna. Apart from holding solo exhibitions of her photographic and other art works, she also taught at the University of Applied Arts Vienna and the Academy of Fine Arts Vienna.

== Biography ==
Jürgenssen was born in Vienna, Austria in 1949. Between 1968 and 1971 she studied at the University of Applied Arts Vienna. She first gained attention for her photography with her participation in the MAGNA-Feminismus: Kunst und Kreativität (MAGNA feminism: art and creativity) exhibition. She is remarked as one of the "Global Feminist Outstanding Figures", and lives in Austria -- she also taught students at the Vienna Application Arts Colledge and Vienna Arts School. Jürgenssen worked as a lecturer and curator.

Jürgenssen died on 25 September 2003 at the age of 54.

== Work and style ==
From the late 1960s, she developed her diverse photographic art forms which revolved around the female body and its transformation.

Jürgenssen's oeuvre presents femininity forms created by photographs, which demarcate the external cultural codes within the frame work of the prevalent repressive and frequently restrictive nature of a women's life. In the corpus of her works, presented in association with Hubert Winter who managed her estate titled "Jürgenssen's estate", the pictures are a wide mosaic of "drawings, water colour paintings, photogrammes, screens, solar graphics and objects from various collections". In 1972, as a gender representation, she photographed her own body in four postures with the inscription "frau (woman)". In another self-portrait taken in 1976, and called "Ich möchte hier raus! (I want out of here!)", Jürgenssen is dressed in a "neat, white lace collar and brooch", and pressing her cheek and hands to a glass display case, which is interpreted to suggest "her entrapment in the repressive codes of beauty and domesticity that women have often been subject to".

Jürgenssen's photographic works, numbering 250, were exhibited in a retrospective held by the Sammlung Verbund and the Bank Austria Art Forum; 50 of these works are exclusively exhibited by the Sammlung Verbund, Vienna.

One of Jürgenssen's works is titled "10 Days – 100 Photos" published in 1980. This collection, which has 100 pictures taken over a period of 10 days, consists of self-portraits, with face excluded or camouflaged by fur, in Polaroids and photographs which have been set in an asymmetrically fashion with interjections of a few lines of narrative. On this picturization Jürgenssen said: "the identity of the woman has been made to disappear – all except for the fetishized object, which is the focus of male fantasy". In another work of 1974 titled "Amazon" she has photographed "mother and child" in a standing pose with hands held like "latter-day holy figures on a tall iron chair."

Jürgenssen used skin as the central design in many of her drawings, objects, and photographs, and adopts and depicts the properties of the materials on the picture. in this context her "shoe series", made in the 1970s, consists of sculptures accompanied by illustrative drawings. She made 18 shoe sculptures, each with different material such as porcelain and wax, rust and bread, animal's jaw bone set over a silk cushion titled "Relict Shoe" (1976), Flyweight Shoes (1973), two paper thin organza boots with appearance of well preserved dead flies stitched into the fabric. Some of her drawings depict three pubis shaped rocks with the title "Beauty Competition" (1978), and Marlene Dietrich in her characteristic pose with eyelash curlers on and smoking in bed.

Other notable hand coloured pictures are: Kitchen Apron, Nest (1979), Nun (1979), self-portrait painted in gold colour in a black-mask lying flat in a "theatrical setting". In particular, in house wife Kitchen Apron (Hausfrauen-Küchenschürze) photograph taken in 1975 work, she depicts herself as female form that subsumes with "a kitchen stove to form a new organism".

== Monographs ==
Jürgenssen is also credited with publication of two major monographs. One was published in 2009 by Hatje Cantz / Sammlung Verbund which was edited by Gabriele Schor and Abigail Solomon-Godeau. This monograph, which has several illustrations of her photographs which bring out her independent approach to the history of art, her equation with literature, theories of psychology, and "structuralism". The second monograph was published in 2011 by Prestel which was edited by Gabriele Schor and Heike Eipeldauer.

- Gabriele Schor (eds.): Birgit Jürgenssen. Hatje Cantz, Ostfildern 2009 ISBN 978-3-7757-2460-9
- Gabriele Schor, Heike Eipeldauer (eds.): Birgit Jürgenssen. Ausst. Kat. Bank Austria Kunstforum, Vienna. Munich, Prestel, 2010 ISBN 978-3-7913-5103-2
- Natascha Burger, Nicole Fritz (eds.): Birgit Jürgenssen. I am. Ausst. Kat. Kunsthalle Tübingen, GAMeC Bergamo, Louisiana Museum. Munich, Prestel, 2018

== Other publications ==
- Landesgalerie Oberösterreich: Birgit Jürgenssen - früher oder später. Anlässlich der gleichnamigen Ausstellung in der Oberösterreichischen Landesgalerie, Linz, 12. Februar - 15. March 1998. Bibliothek der Provinz, Weitra 1998 ISBN 3-85474-022-0.
- Peter Noever (Hrsg.): Birgit Jürgenssen. Schuhwerk - Subversive Aspects of "Feminism". [Katalog anlässlich der gleichnamigen Ausstellung im MAK Wien, 17. March - 6. June 2004] MAK, Vienna 2004 ISBN 3-900688-59-1.
- Gabriele Schor (eds.): WOMAN. The Feminist Avant-Garde of the 1970s. Works from the SAMMLUNG VERBUND, Vienna. Ausst. Kat. BOZAR, Centre for Fine Arts, Brussels, 2014 ISBN 978-9074816434
- Rita E. Täuber (eds.): Gnadenlos. Künstlerinnen und das Komische. Ausst. Kat. Kunsthalle Vogelmann / Städtische Museen Heilbronn. Wienand Verlag, Köln, 2012. ISBN 978-3868321364
- Brigitte Huck (et al.): Die Damen. Ausst. Kat. Zeitkunst Niederösterreich, St. Pölten. Nürnberg: Verlag für moderne Kunst, 2013. ISBN 978-3-86984-446-6
- The Museum of Modern Art, New York (eds.): Photography at MOMA. 1960 – Now. Ausst. Kat. The Museum of Modern Art, New York. New York, The Museum of Modern Art, 2015. ISBN 9780870709692
- Massimo Gioni, Roberta Tenconi (eds.): The Great Mother. Ausst. Kat. Fondazione Nicola Trussardi, Mailand. Mailand, Skira Editore, 2015. ISBN 978-8857228600
- Patricia Allmer (ed.): Intersections. Women artists/surrealism/modernism. Manchester: Manchester University Press, 2016. ISBN 978-0719096488

== Bibliography ==
- Bösch, Gabriele; Essl, Sammlung (2002). Augenblick: Foto, Kunst : 15.02.-30.06.2002. Sammlung Essl. ISBN 978-3-902001-06-1.
- Burcharth, Ewa Lajer-; Söntgen, Beate (1 January 2016). Interiors and Interiority. De Gruyter. ISBN 978-3-11-034045-7.
- Mörtenböck, Peter; Mooshammer, Helge (March 2014). Space (Re)Solutions: Intervention and Research in Visual Culture. transcript. ISBN 978-3-8394-1847-5.
