= Letícia Parente =

Brazilian artist

- Born: Letícia Parente; 1930; Salvador, Bahia, Brazil.
- Died: 1991 (aged 60–61); Rio de Janeiro, Rio de Janeiro, Brazil.
- Occupation: Artist - Activist - Chemist

Letícia Parente (1930–1991) was a Brazilian visual artist who specialized in politically charged video art. Her surreal short films feature elements of body art and performance art. Much of her work is centered around protesting the use of mass torture by the military dictatorship in Brazil throughout the 1970s. Besides her work in activism and art, Parente also held a PhD in chemistry and never left her scientific career after discovering art.

== Biography ==
Letícia Parente was born in Salvador, Bahia, Brazil in 1930. While originally pursuing a degree in chemistry, she became interested in art at the age of 41 and studied printing techniques at the Núcleo de Artes e Criatividade in Rio de Janeiro. Shortly after, she met other artists like Anna Bella Geiger and Sonia Andrade who introduced her to video art. Besides video art, Parente and her artist peers were also pioneers of other experimental art forms in Brazil during the 1970s. These included works of experimental audio-visual slides, photography, mail art, and utilization of xeroxing. The slideshow was an especially popular medium among Brazilian artists in the 1970's. Parente notably used this medium in her piece Auto-retrato (1975), a compilation of twenty-eight slides of photographs depicting a variety of subjects ranging from objects to people. Unfortunately, due to the fragile nature of the materials used by Parente to create her works and lack of means of preservation through proper art institutions, most of her 1970s projects have been lost to time.

Alongside her discovery and love for art, Parente also continued to pursue her career in science. She completed her master's degree at Pontifícia Universidade Católica in analytical chemistry in 1972, and obtained her Livre Docente title in inorganic chemistry in 1976 through the Universidade Federal Fluminense. She would go on to teach chemistry in higher-education institutions in both Brazil and Italy, and also published a handful of books and articles based on her studies.

== Art ==
Throughout her life, Parente created sixteen films. Four were lost somewhere along the line, likely in a fire or thrown away. Her most well known work is Marca Registrada, or "Trademark", a silent VHS film which depicts the artist sewing the words "MADE IN BRASIL" onto the sole of her foot. Another film from the same period, In, follows Parente as she suspends herself using a dresser hanger in a closet. According to artist Myriam Gurba, this video serves in part as an allusion to the execution of Brazilian journalist Vladimir Herzog by torture. The police attempted to cover-up his death as a suicide and he was found hanged in his prison cell. Her film, Preparação I from 1975 is a political commentary on female beauty standards of the era. It shows Parente placing bandages over her face and drawing the appropriate features on top of them. A secondary film was created in 1976, Preparação II. It depicts Parente injecting herself four times over with different socio-political messaged vaccines. (Ex. anti-colonialism, anti-racism, etc.)

In 1976, Parente combined her dual interests in science and art to create the exhibition Medidas (Measurements), held at the Museum of Modern Art, Rio de Janeiro. Visitors used scientific and pseudoscientific devices to measure their own physical, intellectual, and emotional conditions, for the purpose of "...exposing both the power and the limitations of scientific methods to assess, classify, and regulate individuals' bodies and subjectivities." This exhibition is considered to be the first exhibition in Brazil to combine science and art.

== Themes ==
Similar themes appear in all of Parente's works. She primarily conveys Brazilian socio-political statements in an absurd and experimental manner. Focusing mainly on feminist themes, such as women's docile environments. Her act of applying makeup, as seen in Preparation I, examines how women transform their faces into an image with no agency. Task 1 displays Parente's clothes being ironed while she is still wearing them. This illustrates how often society overlooks women and the work they do. She experiments with the human body to explain her views in a jarring way until it is disfigured and exploited. Treating the body as a stage to perform on.

== Career ==
Parente began teaching chemistry in 1950 at the Federal University of Ceará and Pontifical Catholic University of Rio de Janeiro. She published her first monograph, "Electronegativity," in 1969 and was awarded the Oto de Alencar Award in 1970. In 1972, she went to the Center for Art and Creativity to study. In 1976, she taught Inorganic Chemistry using the process of free teaching. In 1977, she won her position in UFC as Full Professor in the Small Press Festival Competition in Antwerp, Belgium. This allowed her to implement a postgraduate course on Inorganic Chemistry. In 1984 she got a postdoctoral intership at the Université de Nice, France for her work in inorganic chemistry. By 1985, she had her second Master's degree in Philosophy of Education from Fundação Getulio Vargas in Italy. In 1987, she helped start Science Education programs at the Science Center in Rio de Janeiro.

== Filmography ==
- Marca Registrada (1975)
- In (1975)
- Preparação I (1975)
- Eu armário de mim (1975)
- Preparação II (1976)
- Telefone Sem Fio (1976)
- Onde (1978)
- Quem Piscou Primeiro? (1978)
- O Homem do Braço e o Braço do Homem (1978)
- De Aflicti (1978)
- Especular (1978)
- Nordeste (1981)
- Tarefa I (1982)

== Awards and nominations ==
Parente's monograph, "Electronegativity" (1969), won the Oto de Alencar Award in 1970.

== Bibliography ==
Andrade, Patricia. "Six Times Woman." Another Screen, Another Gauze, 2025.

Anya and Andrew Shiva. "Letícia Parente (Salvador, 1930- Rio de Janeiro, 1991)." Anya and Andrew Shiva Gallery, John Jay College, 2025.

Leticia Parente.
