= Lea Lublin =

Argentine-French performance artist

- Born: Léa Lublin; 1929; Brest, Poland
- Died: 1999 (aged 69–70); Paris, France
- Education: Academia Nacional de Bellas Artes, Buenos Aires, Argentina
- Known for: Painting, performance, video
- Movement: Feminist art

Lea Lublin (born 1929, Brest, Poland) was an Argentine-French performance artist.

== Early life ==
Lea Lublin was born in a Jewish family. She emigrated to Argentina in 1931 and grew up in Buenos Aires. She graduated from Prilidiano Pueyrredón National School of Fine Arts in 1949. Later on, Lublin worked as a painter. In mid-1960, she moved to Paris. This led her to the Centro de Artes Visuales of the Institute Torquato di Tella, an Argentine center for experimental and avant-garde art.

== Career ==
Lublin's work investigates imagery, often searching for what may not have yet been seen within otherwise familiar imagery.

Lublin also created performance art sometimes called "exhibition-performances." In "Mon fils" (1968), she participated in the respectable May Exhibition in Paris by taking her toddler son to the museums during the regular exhibition hours and exhibiting herself with her child by changing diapers, breastfeeding and putting her son to sleep in his bed that she had brought with them.

Beginning in the 1980s and until her last works in the mid 1990s, Lublin returned to interacting with iconographic works, particularly Renaissance paintings. She deconstructed the imagery of these paintings by, for example, removing the child from different paintings of Madonna with the child. This work explored the role of the baby and his mother in paintings created by male painters. Following psychoanalytical patterns, she identified the painter with the child looking for an eroticized image of the mother in the works or otherwise revealing sexual undertones in Christian imagery.

When Lublin briefly returned to her former home, Buenos Aires, in 1989, she investigated Marcel Duchamp's stay in the city from 1918 to 1919. Lublin got access to Duchamp's former apartment and noticed that both the old windows and the still mostly original colours of some walls matched those of Duchamp's iconic 1920 work Fresh Widow, which he made after returning to Paris. Lublin also discovered that the female alter ego Duchamp used after 1920, Rose Sélavy, matched advertising in a Buenos Aires newspaper that he was known to have read. When she left, she stole the dilapidated letter box from Duchamp's former apartment and exhibited it later, recalling his Readymade works. Lublin's interactions with Duchamp continued when she deconstructed the Rose advertising as well as his famous "pissoirs" in several of her own works, shifting them into a dispute with feminist statements. One of these was titled Le corps amer (à mère), l'objet perdu de M.D., shown at Femininmasculin at Beauborg in Paris. This piece consisted of a large, transparent skirt, stomach, and breasts with a urinal inside.

A major retrospective of her work was organized by the at Lenbachhaus Munich, Germany in 2015. In 2021, Lublin's work was featured in the group exhibition Terapia (Therapy) at the Museo de Arte Latinoamericano de Buenos Aires (MALBA), Argentina.

== Works in collections (selection) ==
Her works are in the collections of

- Museum of Modern Art in New York
- Hammer Museum, at University of California, Los Angeles
- Centre national des arts plastiques, the Fonds régional d’art contemporain Alsace
- Bibliothèque nationale de France

== Literature ==
- Matthias Mühling and Stephanie Weber (ed.): Lea Lublin: Retrospective. Snoeck 2015, ISBN 978-3-86442-128-0
