= Marcella Campagnano =

Artist and Italian feminist photographer

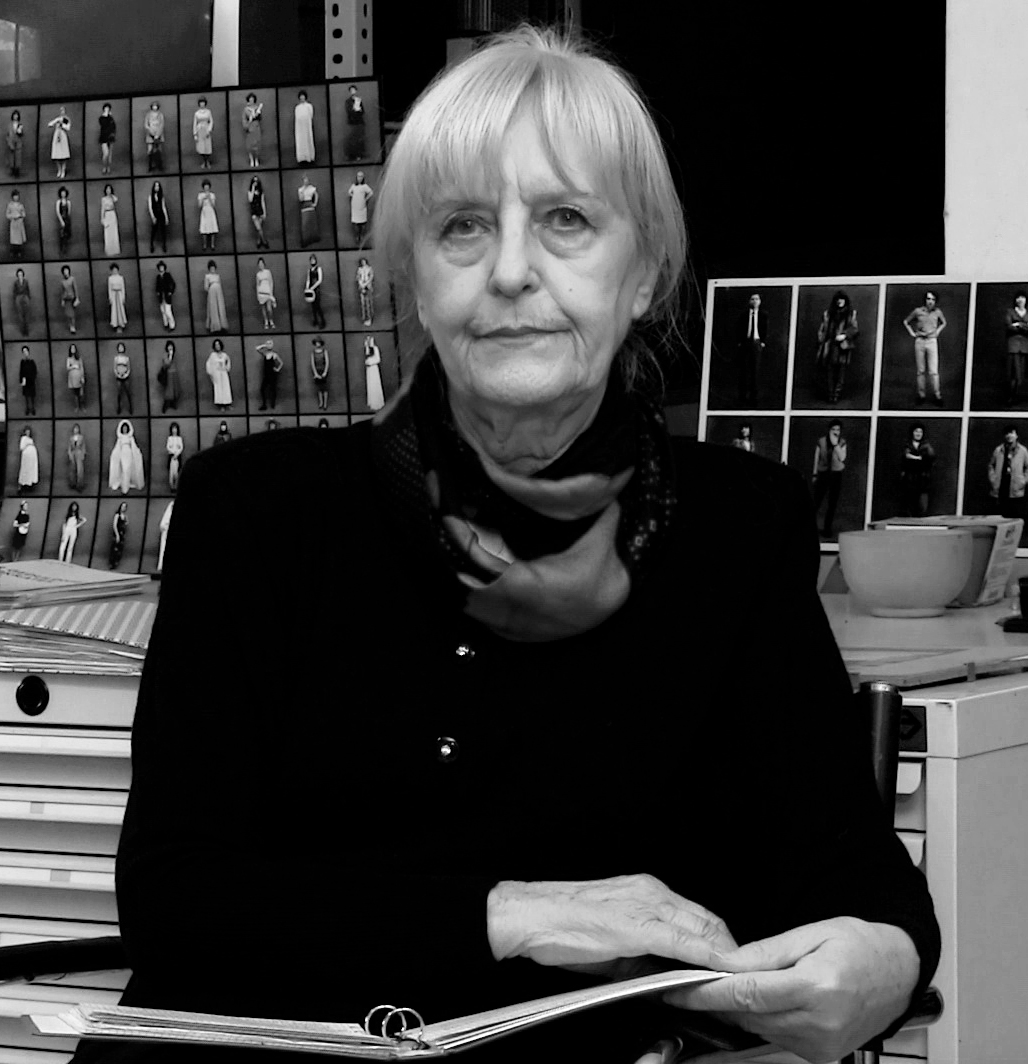
- Born: 1941 (age 84–85); Verdello, Italy
- Education: Brera Academy
- Known for: Visual art and photography

Marcella Campagnano (born 1941) is a contemporary artist and Italian feminist photographer. She lives and works in Como. Using self-portraits, Campagnano documents gender assignments imposed on women.

== Early life and education ==
Campagnano was born in 1941 in Verdello, a commune in Lombardy, Italy. She studied painting at the Brera Academy in Milan and graduated in 1965.

== Work ==
She exhibited her paintings in Italy and abroad until 1972. She began to explore other mediums when she felt that painting was dominated by men and started using photography in 1968, to document feminist issues and themes. Campagnano joined the women's collective Via Cherubini in Milan.

In 1974, she executed the photographic series L'invenzione del Femminile which deals with three aspects Ruoli: the roles assigned to women, Oggetti: the objects assigned to women and Regalia: the attitudes and postures of princes and royalty.

The Ruoli project was inspired by feminist friends posed in her salon in drag. Campagnalo manipulated make-up, clothes and hairstyles to mimic the attitudes and postures imposed on women. The artist documented subjects such as the bride, the mother, the housewife, the worker, the prostitute, the lover, and the activist. She aimed through her work to identify, and question the gender assignments imposed on women.

In the Regalia series, Campagnano explored the relationship between image, representation, and construction. Each photograph was a portrait of a woman in a royal posture, imitating the portraits of Western paintings. The rich and princely looking clothes were made of cheap and recycled materials. In 1976, she published the series Donne imagini in which she further explored the roles imposed on women.

== Publications ==
- La grande allusione: 1974–2015 – I ruoli del femminile di Marcella Campagnano ieri e oggi. Rome: Museum of Contemporary Arts, Sapienza University, 2015.
- L'Invenzione del Femminile. Brescia: Ma.Co.F - centro della fotografia Italiana, 2017.

== See also ==
- Lynn Hershman Leeson
- Martha Wilson
- Suzy Lake
- Cindy Sherman
