= Sonia Andrade =

Brazilian feminist and visual artist

- Born: 1935 (age 90–91); Rio de Janeiro
- Known for: video art, installation, photography, body art

Sonia Andrade (born 1935) is a Brazilian feminist and visual artist. She was born in 1935 in Rio de Janeiro in Brazil She was one of the pioneers in video art in Brazil. Her video works use appropriation, humor, and political commentary to break down accepted visual codes.

== Education ==
In 1973, Andrade studied under Anna Bella Geiger at the Museum of Modern Art in Rio de Janeiro.

== Early work ==
During the 1970s, Andrade was a part of a circle of young artists which included Fernando Cocchiarale, Anna Bella Geiger, Ivens Machado and Leticia Parente that began to respond to the severe period of censorship under the military dictatorship in Brazil through intense productions of individual expression through a simple, direct body language. Overt and accusatory actions were revealed without technical or formal intentions to the tight frame of the camera.

Many of Andrade's early videos feature her performing awkward and painful actions to invoke thought about torture practices employed by the Brazilian government during the dictatorship. For example, Primeira Seria, a 'first series' of videos shot by Andrade in Rio and São Paulo featured television images of Andrade winding a nylon thread around her face until it is disfigured, attacking her body hair with a scissors, driving nails between her fingers, trying to move about with her limbs and head enclosed in bird cages. This series is said to be a critique of television as a tool of conditioning, an echo of the political regime's authority.

Andrade's critique of media and television was also featured in her earliest films. In Untitled (1975), Andrade sat at a table eating a traditional Brazilian meal of black beans, smoked pork, ad sausages with a television set broadcasting an American sitcom and commercials in the background. The seemingly every day scenario turns unexpectedly as discontent awakens inside the artist. The previously harmless television is featured as a source of misery and oppression as the artist begins smearing the beans on her head; shoving them into her mouth with her hand; wiping them on her eyes, ears, and inside her clothes; and ultimately, throwing them at the lens until the scene is obliterated. In Untitled (1977), Andrade appears in front of four televisions and turning them on one by one, then speaks to the audience directly by repeating "turn off the TV" for more than ten minutes to highlight the passivity of the viewers.

== Works ==
Andrade's body of work includes drawings, photography, objects, installation and multi-channel video to achieve what she calls "the most important aspect of art-the relationship between the spectator and the object." Some of her earliest video work dates from the mid-1970s. In these provocative pieces, Andrade deformed her face with threads, fixed her hand to a table with wire and nails, and removed body hairs with scissors. Later work consisted of assemblages of found objects, as well as drawings, photographs, sculptures, neon art and installations. Hydragrammas is her most famous piece of work which consist of hundreds of small objects that assemble into a sculpture, which was eventually displayed in National Museum of Fine Arts and later at the Museum of Contemporary Art of São Paulo.

== Exhibitions ==
- National Museum of Fine Arts, Rio de Janeiro, Brazil, 1993.
- Centro Municipal de Arte Hélio Oiticica (Municipal Art Center Hélio Oiticica), Rio de Janeiro, Brazil, 2011.
- Museum of Contemporary Art, São Paulo, Brazil, 1994.
- Louvre, Paris, France, 2006.
- Museum of Modern Art (MoMA), New York, New York
- Musée National d'Art Moderne, Centre Pompidou, Paris
