= Lydia Schouten =

Dutch performance and video artist

- Born: 1948 (age 77–78); Leiden, Netherlands
- Education: Free Academy in The Hague, Academy of Fine Arts
- Website: http://www.lydiaschouten.com/

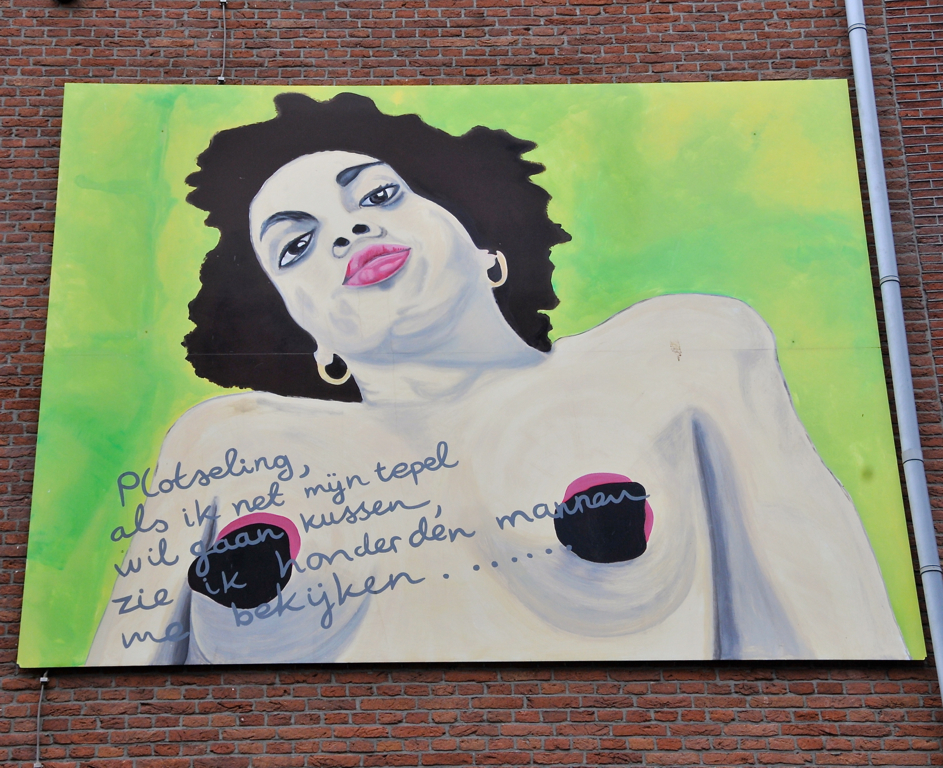
Mural by Lydia Schouten, at Keileweg in Rotterdam, 2002-2005.

Lydia Schouten (born 1948, Leiden, Netherlands) is an internationally-known Dutch performance and video artist. Early in her career she critiqued traditional women's roles and the portrayal of women as sex objects. More recently, her work considers themes of loneliness, sex and violence. As of 2004, she lives in Amsterdam. Her work has been exhibited internationally and she has held artist in residencies in several countries. Schouten received the Maaskant Award from city of Rotterdam in 1975.

== Education ==
Schouten studied at the Free Academy of Visual Arts in The Hague from 1967 to 1971 and at the Academy of Visual Arts in Rotterdam from 1971 to 1976.

== Work ==
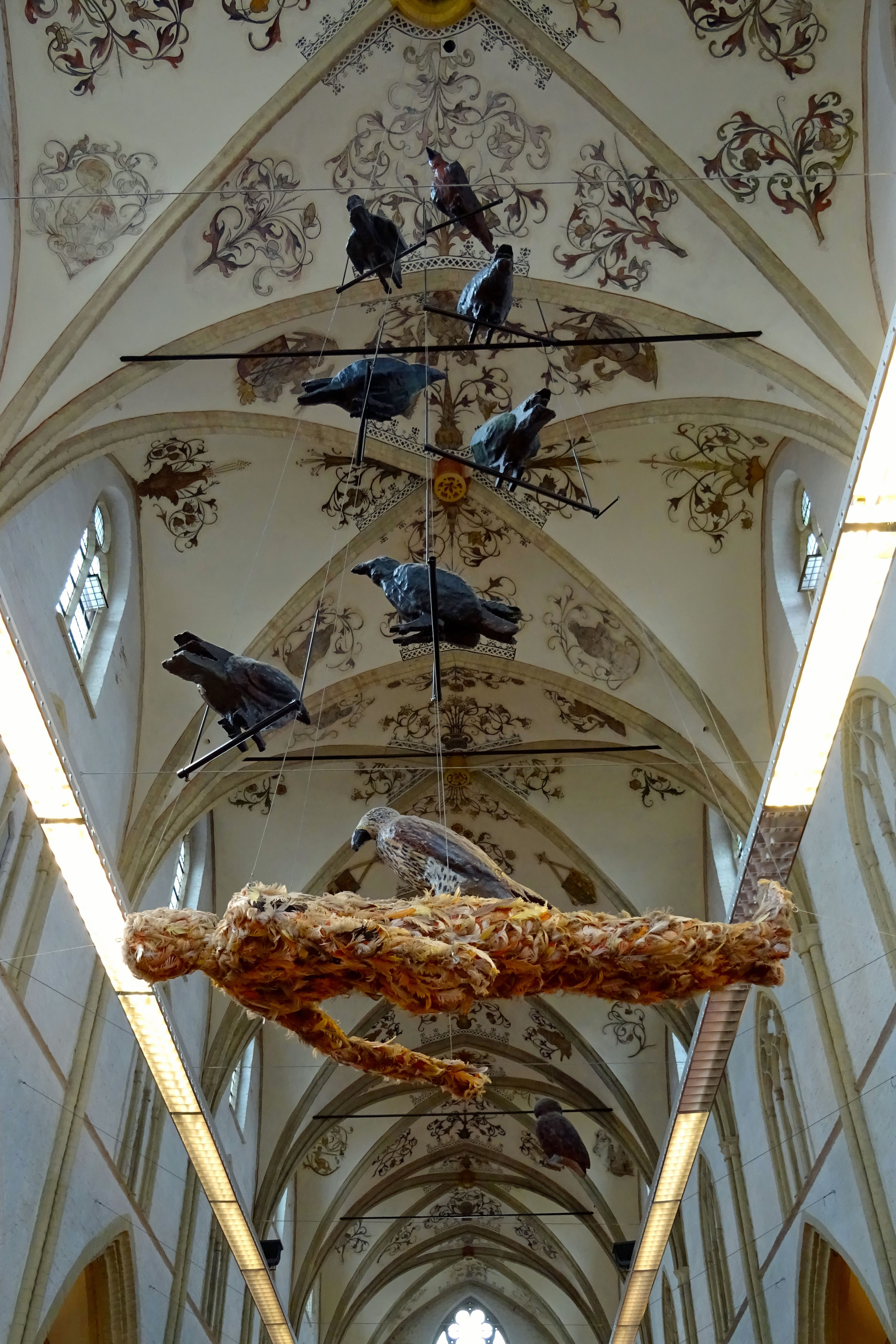
Installation, Lydia Schouten

From 1978 to 1981 she was mainly concerned with performance art, from 1981 to 1988 mainly with video art. She frequently appears in her videos, e.g. Romeo is bleeding (1982). In 1984, her work was included in The Luminous Image, an international exhibition of video art at the Stedelijk Museum. She was a member of the Time Based Arts Foundation, an organization of video artists. Since 1988 she has focused on installations with photography, sound and video as key components. Her work has been described as "a rhetorical corruption of the icons of popular culture" which is at times both "shocking" and "poignantly beautiful". She herself has said that her work often involves overcoming her own fears.

She has received travel grants from the Ministry of Cultural Affairs (1981, 1982) and has been an artist in residence in Curaçao, New Zealand, Canada, the United States, and Germany as well as her native Holland. Her work has been exhibited at the Museum Ludwig in Cologne, the Centre Georges Pompidou in Paris, the Torch Gallery in Amsterdam, the Institute of Contemporary Art in New York City and the Metropolitan Museum of Photography in Tokyo.

Her travels to New York, which was originally settled by the Dutch in 1609, have inspired works such as her media installation A Song for Mannahata. Lydia Schouten has done work for public spaces, such as the Monument voor de Verdronken Dorpen in Zeeland ('Monument to the Drowned Villages') in Colijnsplaat. The monument includes a tower with speakers and a sound installation which serves as a reminder of the 117 villages, and their populations, which were flooded during the Flood of 1953.

== Exhibitions ==
Schouten is in the show "Feminist Avantgarde from the Seventies” which has been traveling around the world since 2016.

== Awards ==
In 1975, she received the Maaskant Award from city of Rotterdam.
