= Àngels Ribé =

Spanish artist

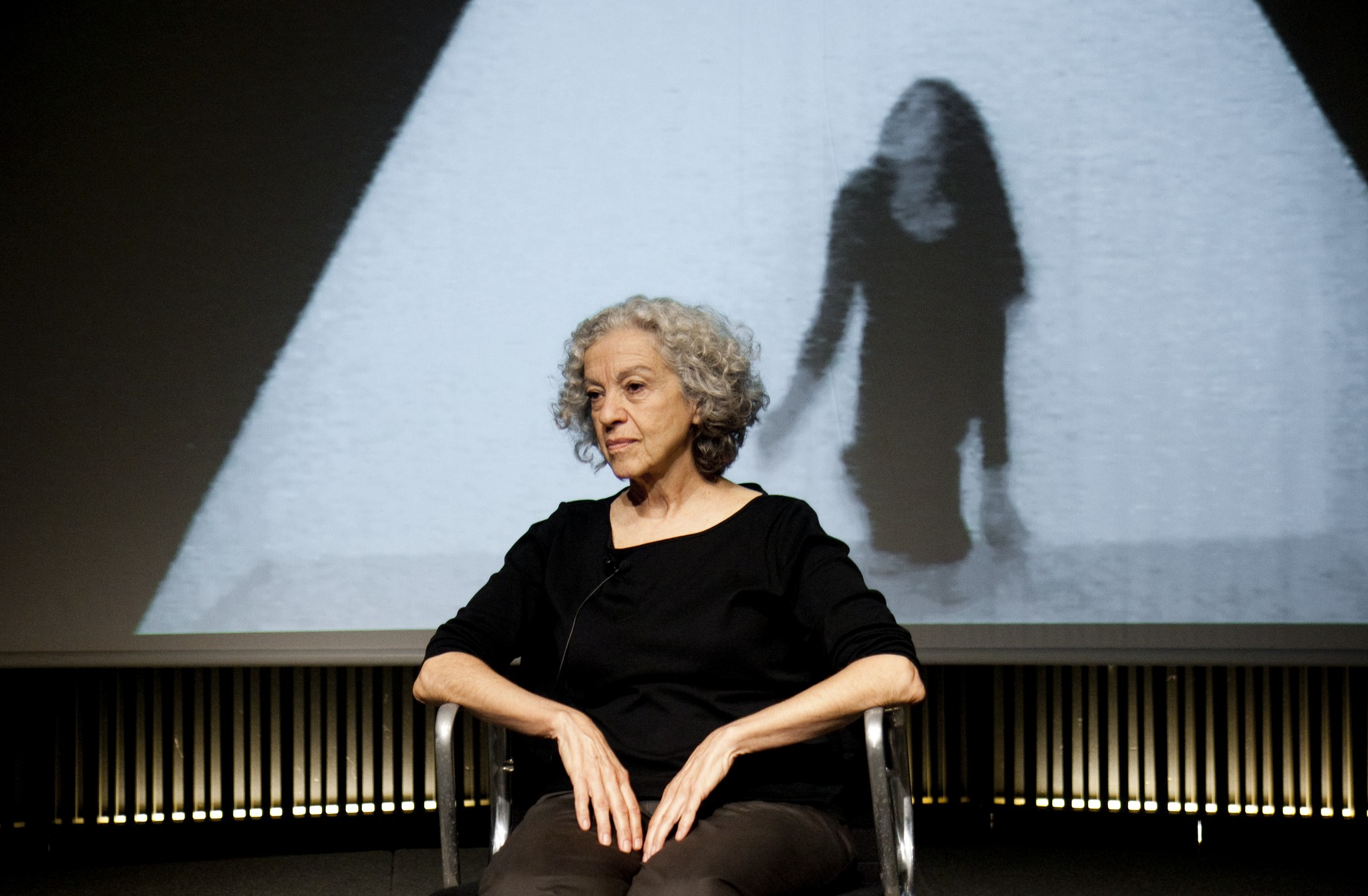
- Born: Àngels Ribé i Pijuan; 1943 (age 82–83); Barcelona, Spain
- Known for: Conceptual art, performance art, installation art
- Awards: National Plastic Arts Prize (2019); Creu de Sant Jordi (2021)

Àngels Ribé (born 1943 in Barcelona) is considered one of the most important Catalan conceptual artists of the 70s. With a strong international presence, she worked alongside such artists as Vito Acconci, Laurie Anderson, Gordon Matta-Clark, Lawrence Weiner, Hannah Wilke, Martha Wilson, Francesc Torres, and Krzysztof Wodiczko, among others.

== Biography ==
Ribé moved from Barcelona to Paris in 1966, and in 1969 began creating sculpture and installations, later actions and performances, working primarily with space and the body. During her years in Paris she studied sociology and ceramics and worked as an assistant to the sculptor Piotr Kowalski.

In 1972 Ribé moved to the United States, where she lived and worked for several months in Chicago before settling in New York City. She returned to Barcelona in 1980.

== Work ==
Ribe's work, contextualized in the conceptual art of the late 60s and 70s, utilized nontraditional material, which she gradually discarded to concentrate on the ephemeral—light and shadow—and the location of the body in space. In Catalonia, her work is in the collections of the Vila Casas Foundation and the Barcelona Museum of Contemporary Art MACBA. Her work from 1969 to 1984 was the subject of a retrospective at MACBA in 2011. For a period she signed her work as "A. Ribé" to avoid prejudgement based on her gender.

=== Main works ===
- Laberint (1969)
- Acció al parc (1969)
- Escuma (1969)
- 3 punts (1970–1973)
- Transport d'un raig de llum (1972)
- Invisible Geometry 3 (1973)
- Light Interaction and Wind Interaction (1973)
- N.A.M.E. (1974) Performance
- Véhicule (1974) Performance at la Galérie de Mont-real.
- Two Main Subjective Points on an Objective Trajectory (1975)
- Can't Go Home (1977)
- Amagueu les nines, que passen els lladres
- Triangle (1978)
- Ornamentació (1979)
- Paisatge (1983)

== Main exhibits ==
Year	Title	Place	City
1969	Laberint	Centre Artístique de Verderonne	París
1975	Two Main subjective Pints on an Objective Trajectory	3 Mercer St. Gallery	New York
1977	Can't Go Home	C Space Gallery	New York
1977	Amagueu les nines que passen els lladres	Galeria G	Barcelona
1977	El viatge: primera part: No es pot tornar	Espai Tres. Acadèmia de Belles Arts de Sabadell	Sabadell
1978	I demà encara plourà, encara que els elelfants tinguin por (perquè tenen els ulls petits)	Fundació Joan Miró	Barcelona
1979	E la forma	Universitat Autònoma de Barcelona	Bellaterra
1979	Ornamentació	Escola Universitària de Professorat	Sant Cugat del Vallès
1979	Ornamentation: the unrelated Object	C Space Gallery	New York
1980	Bajo el...	Sala de Cultura de la Caja de Ahorros de Pamplona	Pamplona
1983	Escultures	Espai 10, Fundació Miró	Barcelona
1998	Angels Ribé 1997	Centre d'Art Santa Mònica. Espai Vau	Barcelona
1998	El terrat	Galeria Senda	Barcelona
2003	Àngels Ribé	Fundació Vila Casas, Espai VolART	Barcelona
2011	En el laberint. Àngels Ribé 1969-1984	MACBA	Barcelona

== Awards ==
- 2012 - Premi Nacional de Cultura
- 2019 - Honorary GAC Award (Premi Honorífic GAC), awarded by the Gremi de Galeries d'Art de Catalunya
- 2019 - National Plastic Arts Prize (Premio Nacional de Artes Plásticas), awarded by the Spanish Ministry of Culture
- 2021 - Creu de Sant Jordi
