= Kirsten Justesen =

Danish artist

- Born: 25 December 1943 (age 82); Odense, Denmark
- Known for: Sculpture, scenography
- Movement: Body art, Performance art, Conceptual art
- Awards: 2005 Thorvaldsen Medal
- Website: kirstenjustesen.com

Kirsten Justesen (born 25 December 1943) is a Danish artist living and working in Copenhagen and New York City. She has been part of the feminist art movement.

== Biography ==
Born 25 December 1943, Justesen graduated from the Royal Danish Academy of Fine Arts in 1975. She studied classical sculpture. Her work includes body art, performance art, sculpture and installation. Justesen was part of the 1960s avant-garde scene and a pioneer in three-dimensional art that incorporate the artist's own body. She created feminist art intended to challenge traditional value systems during the 1970s. Her later works examines relationships between body, space, and language.

Justesen has created exhibitions, events, museum installations, performances, and murals since the mid-1960s. She has a lifelong grant from The Danish Arts Foundation. Justesen has taught in Scandinavia, the U.S., and the Middle East. Justesen advocates for women artists' rights and influence in the art world through her work on various boards and positions in foundations, and by co-organizing seminars concerning women artists' positions in society.

Justesen has designed theatre sets since 1967, including collaborations with ballet companies in the 1990s, libretto and production design with the Randi Patterson Company, and working with set designers at The Danish National School of Theatre from 1985 to 1990.

Justesen's publication Kors Drag was published 1999; it comprises a collection of 200 images and 100 lines of words, rewritten by international female artists. Meltingtime # 11 is a retrospective catalogue published in 2003, documenting the melting times presented since 1980.

Justesen's work has a sharp political edge. Her work challenged the art world and society's gender perceptions and marginalization of women. In the 1970s, she made critical, humorous counter images to the male artists' romanticized depictions of the housewife in the home, such as "The Housewife Pictures." The images were distributed as posters and in women's magazines and art literature in the 1970s.

Justesen often incorporates ice as an artistic element, as it is an apt metaphor for the processes and changes to which the body is subject.

In 1970, she participated in the Damebilleder, which was one of the first exhibitions featuring and organized by women artists.

A Monument to Countess Danner designed by Justesen was unveiled in Copenhagen in 2024.
