= Eulàlia Grau =

Catalan Artist

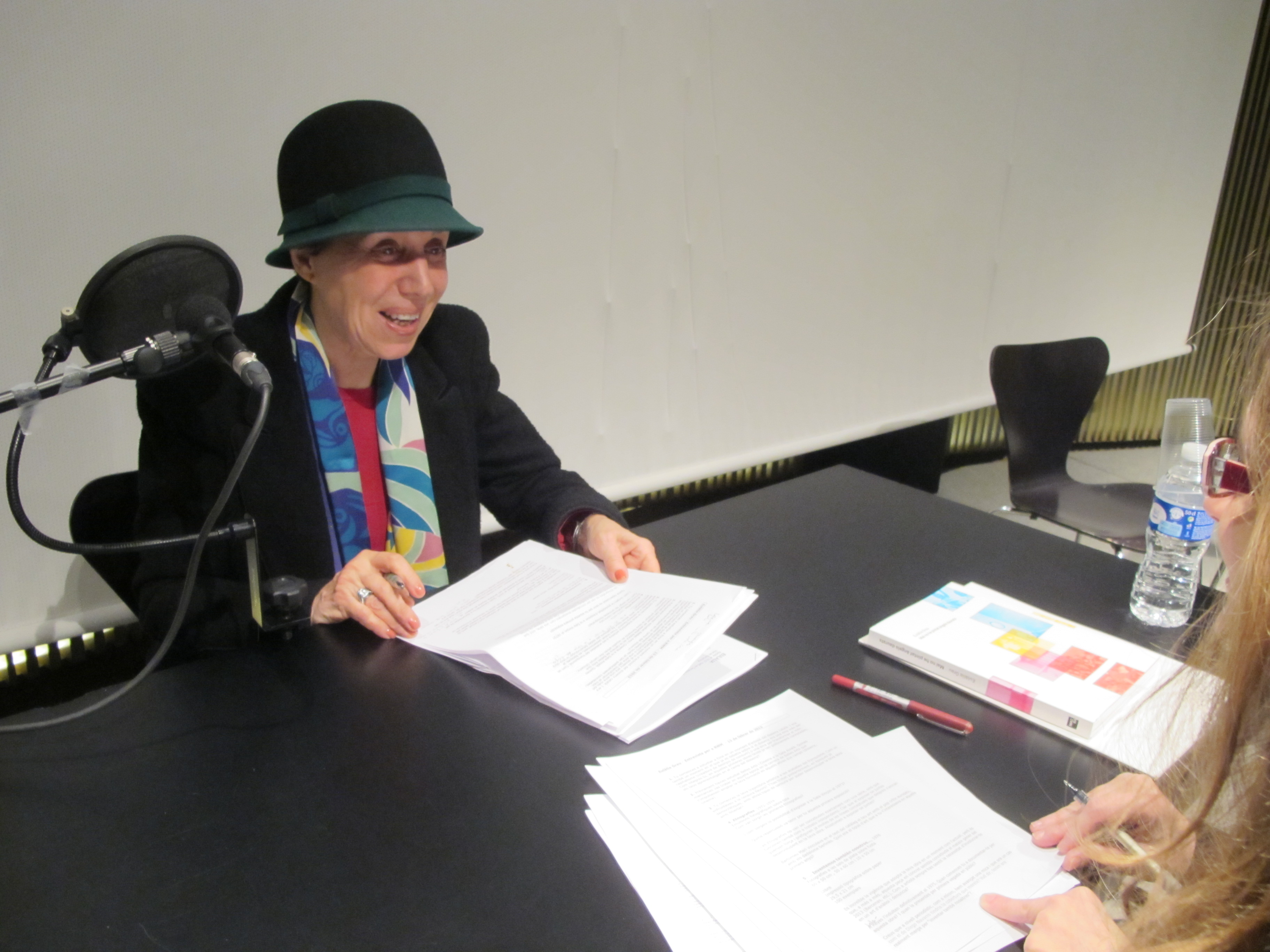
Eulàlia Grau during an interview for Ràdio Web MACBA.

Eulàlia Grau, also known by her given name, Eulàlia is a Catalan artist. She was born in Terrassa in 1946. After training in Fine Arts at the Escola Eina and in design in Milan, she began her work starting from collage, using photographs taken from the written press, adopting a critical attitude towards information given out by the communication media. Her works carry a significant political charge and social content.

Between 1984 and 1990 she could be found in Berlin. In 1991, having specialised in Chinese studies and Eastern culture, she went to live some years in Beijing.

== Work ==
Since the early seventies, Eulàlia has been creating photographic montages and collages. She criticises the way in which the press, in line with the political and economic powers, serves the interests of what she perceives as a controlled, censured, unjust and male-dominated society. She believes that media propagates social models of cultural and economic dominance, as well as forms of ideological and physical violence. Eulàlia's views her work as a document of a period of changes and crisis, with uncomfortable parallels to the present. She believes her aesthetic option cannot be understood without her strong ethical commitment: that it holds a prominent place among the artistic practices that make up the space of expression occupied by feminist movements at the end of modernity, and that are part of the changes in opinion that radically altered our society at the end of Francoist Spain and during the transition that followed.

Furthermore, a common feature of her work is the effort to unmask the differences that tarnish our environment, the structural violence that permeates everyday life and, also, the macrosystem in which we find ourselves immersed. Denounces the instrumentalization of our lives and politics, marked by the interests of capital and the market. So you can see in her main works:

- Etnografies (1972-1974): In this series of canvases, she builds collages, based on press photographs, in which he presents images with critical associations and acid comments about consumption, violence, the use of power and bourgeois values. She presented it at the Sala Vinçon in Barcelona in 1973 and at the Buades Gallery in Madrid the following year. For this first exhibition she made a collage in which he included her photography, with images around. It is a kind of biography that narrates the sins committed and their usual objects of consumption. With sins she condemned herself before the Catholic Church; with commercial products, before the pitfalls of the system.
- La cultura de la mort (1975): is a series of serigraphs where it contrasts scenes of hunts, demonstrations, police persecutions and robberies to banks. All images allude to ways of exercising power, often through violence. It reveals a society and a culture rooted in death and destruction.
- Cancionero de los hombres verticales y de los hombres horizontales (1975): is a book, until now unpublished, where it deals with the forms of representation of the triumphant or vertical men, and those of the horizontal men, losers or failures. It emphasizes symbolic attributes and this allows it to characterize the two typologies and the belonging to different social classes.
- El cost de la vida (1977-1979): is a quadrillage or comparative cartography of the three stages of capitalism: protocapitalism (typical of countries such as Spain, Italy or France), postcapitalism (Germany) and precapitalism (Third World). It shows how control is exercised with greater or lesser subtlety, but is present in all systems and always legitimized by society.
- A Desarmament-desenvolupament (1979): evidence, in a poster, the contradiction between peace agreements and the true background of political decisions. Thus, it shows how the president of the United States, Jimmy Carter, increased the Defense budget by 9.4% in 1979, despite the commitment to limit arms production.
- Aspiradora (1973): it belongs to the Etnografies series.
- Per què? (1979): several colors are combined in this piece of work, where topics such as war, violence, money and sex are treated from a child's perspective.

== Exhibitions ==
- 2013- Eulàlia Grau. I Have Never Painted Golden Angels MACBA, Barcelona It is her first book, published in 2013. It includes photomontages that denounce the educational and family institution, gender stereotypes, class differences, labor exploitation and power consolidation structures.

Individual Exhibitions

- 1973 Galeria Vinçon, Barcelona
- 1974 Madrid
- 1976 Barcelona
- 1979 Genf
- 1980 Conway Hall Londres
- 1984 Werkstatt Galerie Munich
- 1985 Tokio

Collectives Exhibitions

- 1978 Staatliche Kunsthalle, Berlin
- 1979 Fundació Joan Miró, Barcelona
- 1980 Zagreb
- 1980 Palau de Velázquez, Madrid
- 1981 Kunstmuseum Rouen, France
- 1983 Galerie Ars Viva, Berlin
