= Kettenhofweg 124/124a =

Former brothel and murder scene in Frankfurt

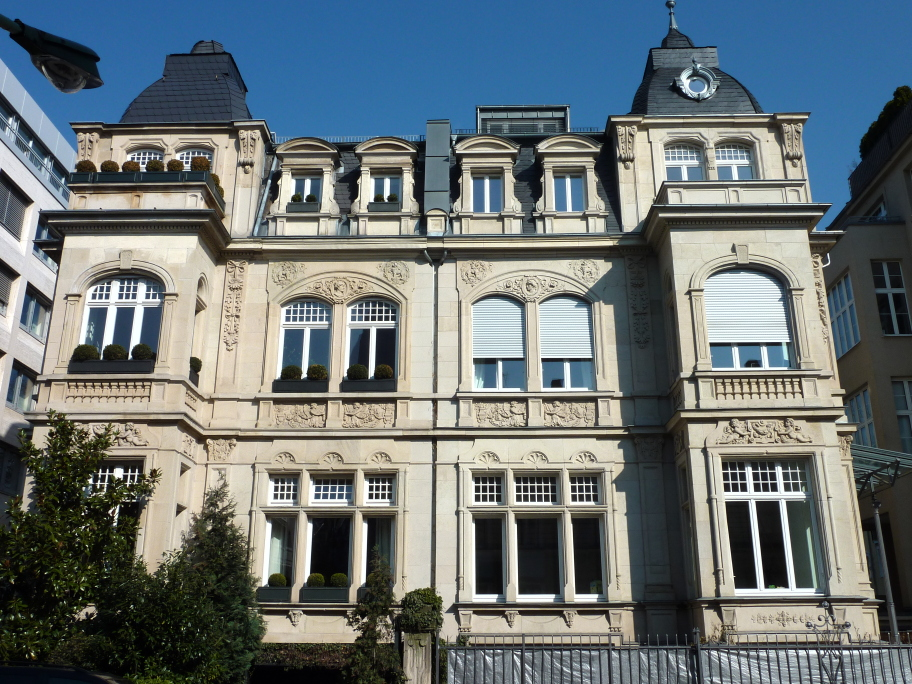
Frankfurt Kettenhofweg 124/124a

Kettenhofweg 124/124a is a listed semi-detached house from the early 20th century. The house on the Kettenhofweg in Frankfurt's Westend district was, in 1994, the scene of a sixfold murder whilst the house was being used as a brothel. The house stood empty for a while after the murders until it was bought by a Viennese real estate company. It is now occupied by an investment company.

== The building ==
The building is a neo-Baroque style double tenement with a rich, partially sculpted stone façade and overhanging side risalits. The building is partly original. It was built in 1902.

== Brothel ==
In 1977, the house was brought by Hungarian businessman Gabor Bartos and his German wife Ingrid. The couple lived in the ground floor, and in the converted cellar and on the first and second floors, they operated an exclusive brothel. The cellar consisted of a make-up room, a meeting room where the prostitutes were presented to clients, a sauna and a locker room.

Many of the clients were from business, politics, authorities and from the judiciary. New clients were only accepted on the recommendation of existing clients. Ingrid Bartos also owned a stationery store in Frankfurt and would issue receipts for stationery to brothel customers so they could claim their visit against expenses. The prostitutes were mainly from Hungary, Estonia and the CIS countries.

== Murders ==
On August 15, 1994, the owners and four Russian prostitutes were found murdered. The body of Gabor Bartos was found in the sauna, strangled from behind, the bodies of his wife Ingrid and Marina Erokina were found in other rooms in the basement. Veronika Sorokina and Yelena Starikova were found dead on the first floor and Olga Lucina on the 2nd. All had been strangled with electrical flex.

Initially the Russian mafia were suspected of the murders. Sofia Berwald, a Moldovan former prostitute in the brothel and her husband Eugen Berwald (born Yevgeny Balakin in Moldova) were detained as suspects. Police later established the murders occurred when Gabor Bartos returned from walking his dog to find Eugen and Sofia Berwald robbing the brothel. Eugen Berwald was sentenced to life imprisonment for sixfold murders, his wife Sofia was sentenced to 6 years imprisonment for robbery.

Frieda Vogel wrote a novel Todesengel über Frankfurt : ein Psychothriller über die Bordell-Morde im Kettenhofweg (Death angel over Frankfurt: a psychological thriller about the brothel murders in Kettenhofweg) based on the murders.

== Literature ==
- Heinz Schomann, Volker Rödel, Heike Kaiser: Denkmaltopographie Stadt Frankfurt am Main. Hauptband. 2. Auflage. Herausgegeben von der Stadt Frankfurt 1994, ISBN 3-7973-0576-1, S. 356.
- Frank Berger, Christian Setzepfandt: 101 Unorte, 2011, ISBN 978-3-7973-1248-8, S. 33
- Landesamt für Denkmalpflege Hessen (ed.): Kettenhofweg 124/124a In: DenkXweb, online edition of Cultural monuments in Hesse
