= Lichter Filmfest Frankfurt International =

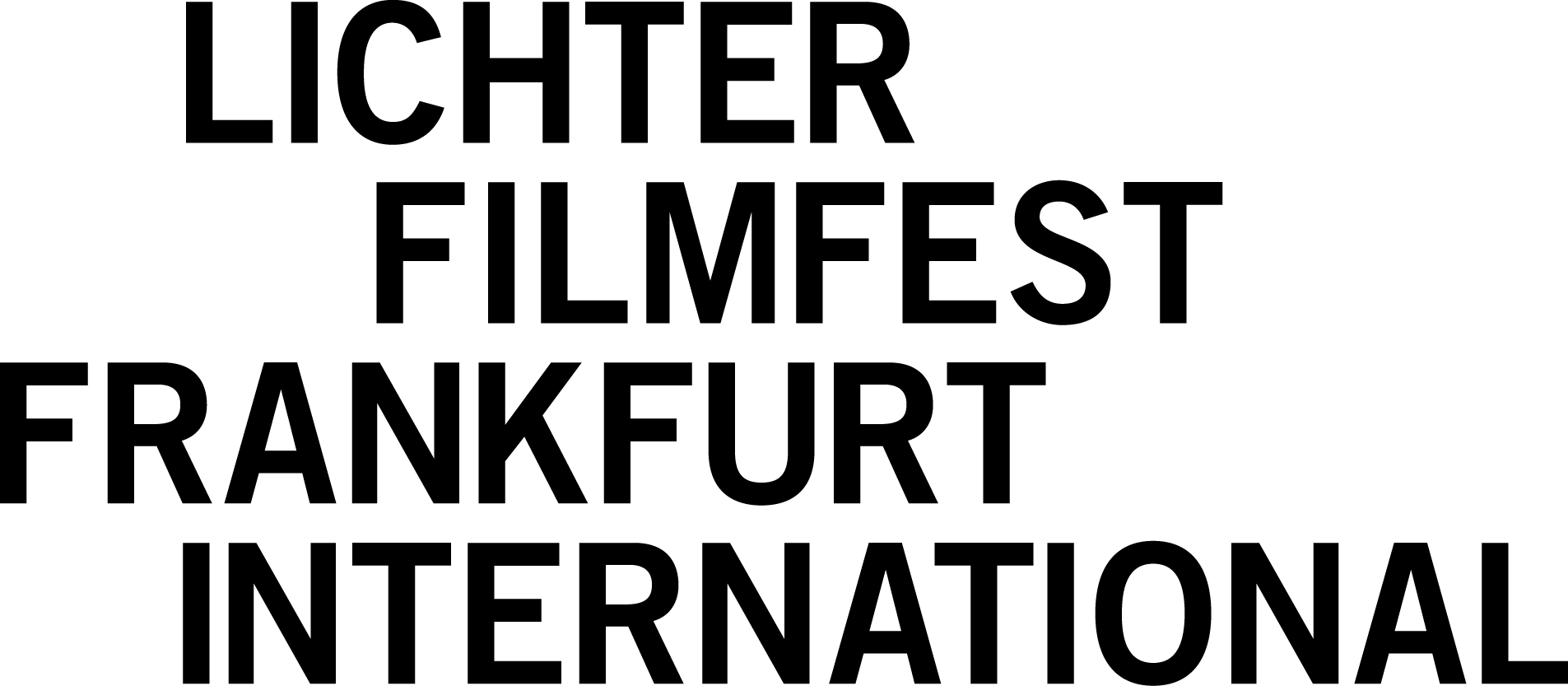
- Location: Frankfurt am Main
- Founded: 2008
- Awards: Bembel
- Festival date: April 28 – May 3, 2026
- Website: www.lichter-filmfest.de

Established in 2008, the Lichter Filmfest Frankfurt International is a film festival taking place in Frankfurt, Germany and the Rhine-Main region every year in spring. Aside from regional film productions in competition for Best Short and Feature Film, the festival also presents international films, VR film productions and video art.

== History ==
Under the name of Lichter Filmtage Frankfurt/Rhein-Main, the festival now known as Lichter Filmfest Frankfurt International was initiated by festival director Gregor Maria Schubert in 2008. The festival was founded by Gregor Maria Schubert, Stephan Limbach, Mark Liedtke, Alexander Dumitran, and Cordula Mack. The festival was founded by Gregor Maria Schubert, Stephan Limbach, Mark Liedtke, Alexander Dumitran, and Cordula Mack. Currently, it is headed by Gregor Maria Schubert and Johanna Süss, supported by a team of volunteers.

The festival made its debut as a show for regional film productions. In the years to follow it developed into a show featuring international productions as well as a film competition. The festival changed its location from the former AtelierFrankfurt near the Frankfurt main station to the former cinema Frankfurter Turmpalast in the inner-city of Frankfurt. So during the festival and beyond, LICHTER plays films and other events at vacant buildings in the city, such as the former diamond exchange or the office building VAU. The Lichter Art Award (founded in 2008 under the name "Kunstlichter," curated by Saul Judd) awards a prize for video art. In the festival center, installations and panel shows present new perspectives and approach the featured topic from a theoretical standpoint.

In 2012, Lichter Filmfest Frankfurt International was distinguished as a "motion sensor" (Bewegungsmelder) by the Federal Government's "Initiative Kultur- und Kreativwirtschaft." In 2013, the festival took place under the patronage of Volker Schlöndorff, in 2014 under the patronage of Leander Haußmann and in 2016 under the patronage of Edgar Reitz. Since 2014, in cooperation with the hessische Film- und Medienakademie and under the direction of Bert Rebhandl, the "Lichter Kritikerblog" offers students the opportunity to discuss the medium of film journalistically. On the initiative of Edgar Reitz, a conference addressed the future of German cinema. Approximately 100 filmmakers developed a concept which recommends pivotal changes in funding and financing, education, distribution and cinema culture – the Frankfurt Positions on the Future of German Cinema.

The festival is financed by public grants, donations and sponsors. In the years 2012, 2016, 2017 and 2018 the festival even used crowdfunding.

Beyond the festival week, the Lichter Filmkultur e.V. hosted the "Frankfurter Sequenzen", "essenkochenfilme" and a movie picnic at the Schwanheim ferry terminal in Höchst. Since 2014, the association hosts the „Freiluftkino Frankfurt“. Additionally, in 2019, the „Sommerkino im Altwerk“ in Rüsselsheim was founded and in 2022 the first edition of "High Rise Cinema" took place.

In 2023, the association and its festival were awarded the Binding Culture Prize in Frankfurt's Paulskirche for their outstanding cultural achievements in Frankfurt am Main and the Rhine-Main region.

== Program ==
Beyond the regional film competition, the festival presents an international film program. Since 2012 this program addresses a certain thematic focal point. In 2013, the key theme was "City", while in 2014 the films addressed the topic "Humor, comicality, and comedy." In 2015, the festival presented films from around the world focusing on "Money" and in 2016 on "Frontiers". In 2017, the international program was focused on the theme of "Truth", in 2018 everything revolved around "Chaos" and in 2019 "Nature" was the main theme for the international program. In 2020 and 2021 the main themes were "Power" and "Change, respectively. In 2022 "Freedom", in 2023 "Love", in 2024 "Future", in 2025 "Fear" and in 2026 "Art".

In addition to the film screenings, the program includes discussion panels and talk shows for the filmmakers of the Rhine Main Area. Aside from film screenings, the year-round events include concerts and talk shows and discussion forums. In addition, the Lichter Filmfest regularly guest in the cinemas both of the region and of Frankfurt's twin cities.

=== Sections ===
- International films (key theme)
- Section Future German Film (feature film)
- Regional Competition (short film, feature film)
- Films out of competition (short film, feature film)
- VR Storytelling Competition (international competition)
- Thematic accompanying program (Lectures, Panels, business talk)
- Lichter Art Award (International competition and exhibition)

== Congress “Zukunft Deutscher Film” ==
In April 2018, around 100 filmmakers came together during the LICHTER Filmfest in Frankfurt. Moved by their belief in cinema, the directors, producers, cinema and festival organizers, sponsors, distribution executives, actors and critics worked on a conceptual changes for the funding and financing, training and film education, distribution and cinema culture that could enliven German film: the “Frankfurter Positionen”.

One year after starting the “Frankfurter Positionen”, they still were the topic of many discussions; including a debate on the future of German film funding at the Berlinale. During the 12th LICHTER Filmfest, a day of talks between representatives from politics took place. In the wake of Lichter-On-Demand in the year 2020, the festival initiated a podcast series dealing with the results of right-wing populism and the Corona pandemic on the film sector. This series was continued in the wake of the second On-Demand festival edition in 2021 with an English-language panel on the future of film culture.

The second congress "Zukunft Deutscher Film" (Future of German Film) - with the additional title "Forum Europa" - was held in several of Frankfurts museums and cultural institutions. In cooperation with FERA, the European association representing the interests of film and television directors, guests from numerous European countries were invited, including the Greek-French director Costa-Gavras. In preparation for the second congress, the publication "Das andere Kino" (The Other Cinema) was published in December 2021, dealing with the future of cinema in various texts - by Edgar Reitz, Daniela Kloock, Rüdiger Suchsland, Vinzenz Hediger and Nathalie Bredella, among others.

Under the motto "100 Jahre Frankfurter Positionen" (100 years of the Frankfurt positions), the third congress took place in cooperation with the University of Frankfurt Institute for Social Research. In search of a brighter future for the German film culture, on a basis of the critical theory developed by the Frankfurt School. The five years since the original "Frankfurter Positionen were also reflected upon - in view of the upcoming amendment of the "Filmförderungsgesetz" (film subsidy law). The congress featured speeches from Irene von Alberti und Frieder Schlaich (Filmgalerie 451), Dominik Graf, Alfred Holighaus, Wolfgang M. Schmitt, Moritz Baßler and Sophie Linnenbaum, among others. In preparation to the event, the publication "Not und Zerstreuung" (hardship and dissipation) was released.

In April 2025, the fifth congress was held under the theme of “Fear.” For three days, filmmakers, researchers, and cultural figures discussed how this fundamental emotion shapes culture, film production, media, and storytelling.

== Attendances ==
Starting out with an improvised cinema and 3,300 visitors in its first year, the Lichter Filmfest has evolved into a festival with more than one hundred films and events and 13,000 visitors.

== Awards and laureates ==
The diverse film culture in Hessen and the Rhine-Main region is being lauded with the Regional Feature Film and Short Film awards. Since 2011, the Lichter Art Award honors contemporary video art from all around the world. In the internationally advertised VR Storytelling Award, the festival organisers have been searching for extraordinary virtual reality films since 2017.

The winners are awarded the "Lichter-Bembel," a typical Frankfurt earthenware apple wine pitcher. The Best Regional Feature Film Award is endowed with €3,000. For the Best Regional Short, the Lichter Art Award and the VR Storytelling Award, €1,000 are awarded in cash. In addition, the Binding Audience Award with a prize money of €2,000 is awarded. From 2016 to 2018, the festival also honored the best contribution to the International Program with the International Feature Award, which included €1,500.

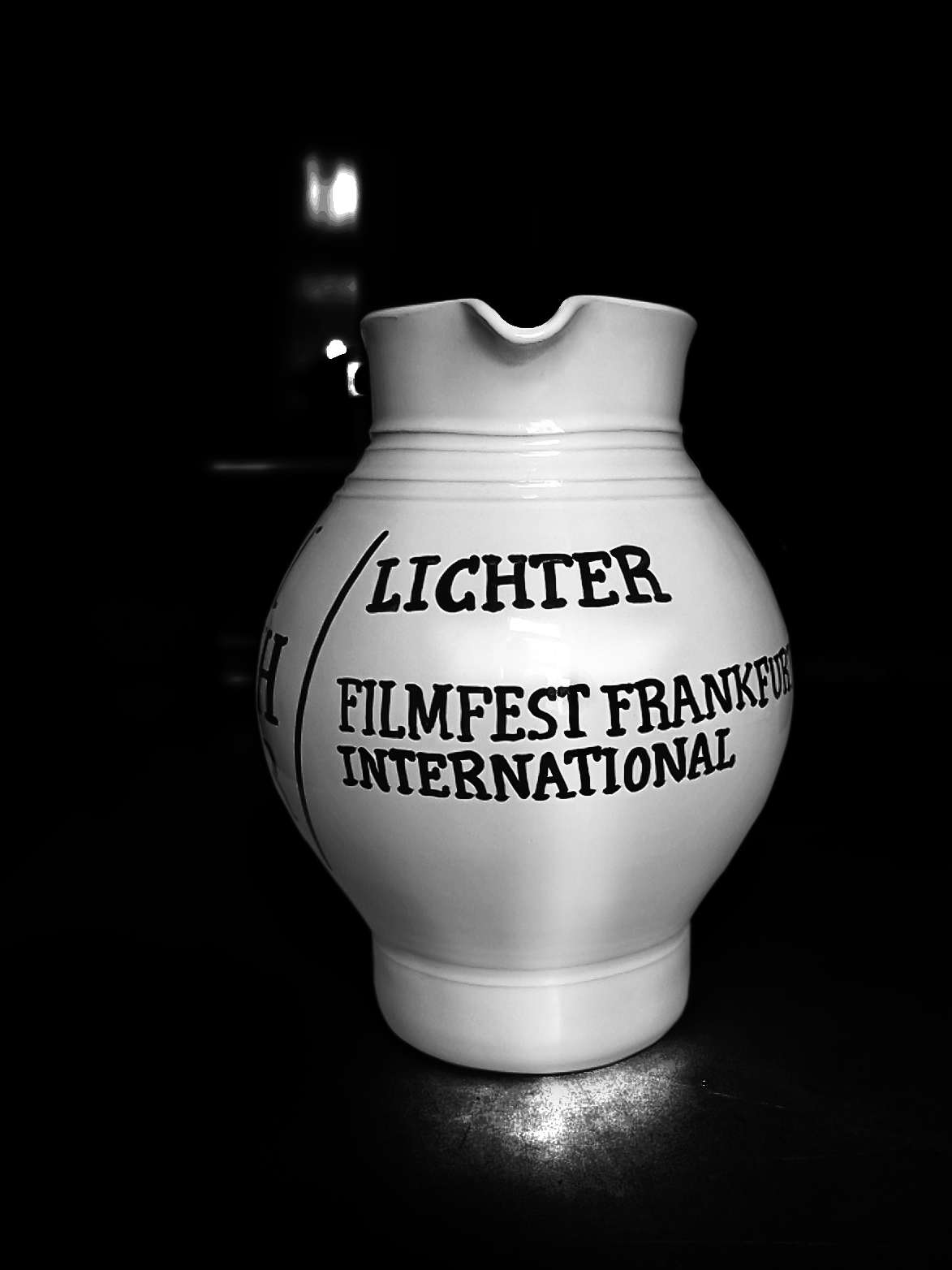
The Lichter-Bembel is being awarded to the winners of the LICHTER Filmfest Frankfurt International

2008

- Regional Feature Film: Video Kings by Daniel Acht and Ali Eckert
- Regional Short Film: Der Jäger und der Bär by Joachim Brandenberg

2009

- Regional Feature Film: Endstation der Sehnsüchte by Sung-Hyung Cho
- Regional Short Film: Adamsapfel by Johannes Baptista Ludwig and Sascha Geerdts

2010

- Regional Feature Film: Das Schreiben & das Schweigen by Carmen Tartarotti
- Regional Short Film: T.R.A. by Eva Becker
- Special reference of the jury: Marivanna by Olga Petrova and Riverrun & Touchdown by Gunter Deller

2011

- Regional Feature Film: At Ellen's Age by Pia Marais
- Regional Short Film: N Gschichtn by Eva Becker
- Laudatory reference of the jury: Die Allerletzten by Otmar Hitzelberger
- LICHTER Art Award: Caja Tarro Silla Marco by Luciana Lamothe

2012

- Feature Film: Babycall by Pål Sletaune
- Short Film: Die alte Frau by Ariane Mayer
- LICHTER Art Award: Dear What's Your Face by Oliver Husain
- LICHTER Art Award: Sent på Jorden by John Skoog

2013

- Regional Feature Film: Im Land dazwischen by Melanie Gärtner
- Regional Short Film: Misguided by Lukas Rinker
- Audience Award: Die Meta-Morphose. Leicht verstimmt ins Rampenlicht by Daniel Siebert
- Laudatory reference of the jury: Wildwechsel by Gunter Deller

2014

- Regional Feature Film: Erhobenen Hauptes by DocView
- Regional Short Film: Bahar im Wunderland by Behrooz Karamizade and RE50 Richtung Wächtersbach by Leslie Bauer
- Audience Award: The Scrapbox by Daniel Herzog (director) and Robin Wissel (creative leader)
- Laudatory reference of the jury: Meine Beschneidung by Arne Ahrens, Peter Rist - Idealist by Michael Schwarz, and Qasbegi by Michel Klöfkorn
- LICHTER Art Award: Unmanned Distances by Bertrand Flanet

2015

- Regional Feature Film: Sin & Illy still alive by Maria Hengge and Conduct! Jede Bewegung zählt by Götz Schauder
- Regional Short Film: Ein bisschen Normalität by Michael Schaff and Thomas Toth
- Audience Award: Carlo, Keep Swingin’ by Elizabeth Ok
- LICHTER Courage Award: X-X-XX—X—Gewobenes Papier by Michel Klöfkorn
- Laudatory reference of the jury: Gezeitentümpel by Pablo Zinser, and Warum ist der Tisch schräg!/Warum mag jeder Geld! by Stefan Vogt
- LICHTER Art Award: The Second of August by Jonathan Van Essche

2016

- Regional Feature Film: Meine Brüder und Schwestern im Norden by Sung-Hyung Cho
- Regional Short Film: In the Distance by Florian Grolig
- International Feature Award: Les Sauteurs by Abou Bakar Sidibé, Estephan Wagner, and Moritz Siebert and Masaan by Neeraj Ghaywan
- Audience Award Feature Film: Auf einer Skala von 1–10 by Katharina Uhland
- Audience Award Short Film: In the Distance by Florian Grolig and The Old Man and the Bird by Dennis Stein-Schomburg
- Laudatory reference of the jury: Der Langstreckenläufer by Zuniel Kim
- LICHTER Art Award: B-Roll with Andre by James N. Kienitz Wilkins

2017

- Regional Feature Film: A Gravame – das Stahlwerk, der Tod, Maria und die Mütter von Tamburi by Peter Rippl
- Regional Short Film: Über Druck by Sebastian Binder and Fred Schirmer
- International Feature Award: I am not Madame Bovary by Feng Xiaogang
- Audience Award Feature Film: Ghostland by Simon Stadler und Catenia Lermer
- LICHTER Art Award: Simba in New York by Tobi Sauer
- VR Storytelling Award: Sergeant James by Alexandre Perez

2018

- Regional Feature Film: Männerfreundschaften by Rosa von Praunheim
- Regional Short Film: Horizont by Peter Meister
- International Feature Award: Blue My Mind by Lisa Brühlmann
- Audience Award Feature Film: Women of the Venezuelan Chaos by Margarita Cadenas
- LICHTER Art Award: Waiting for Record by Jakob Engel
- VR Storytelling Award: I, Philip by Pierre Zandrowicz

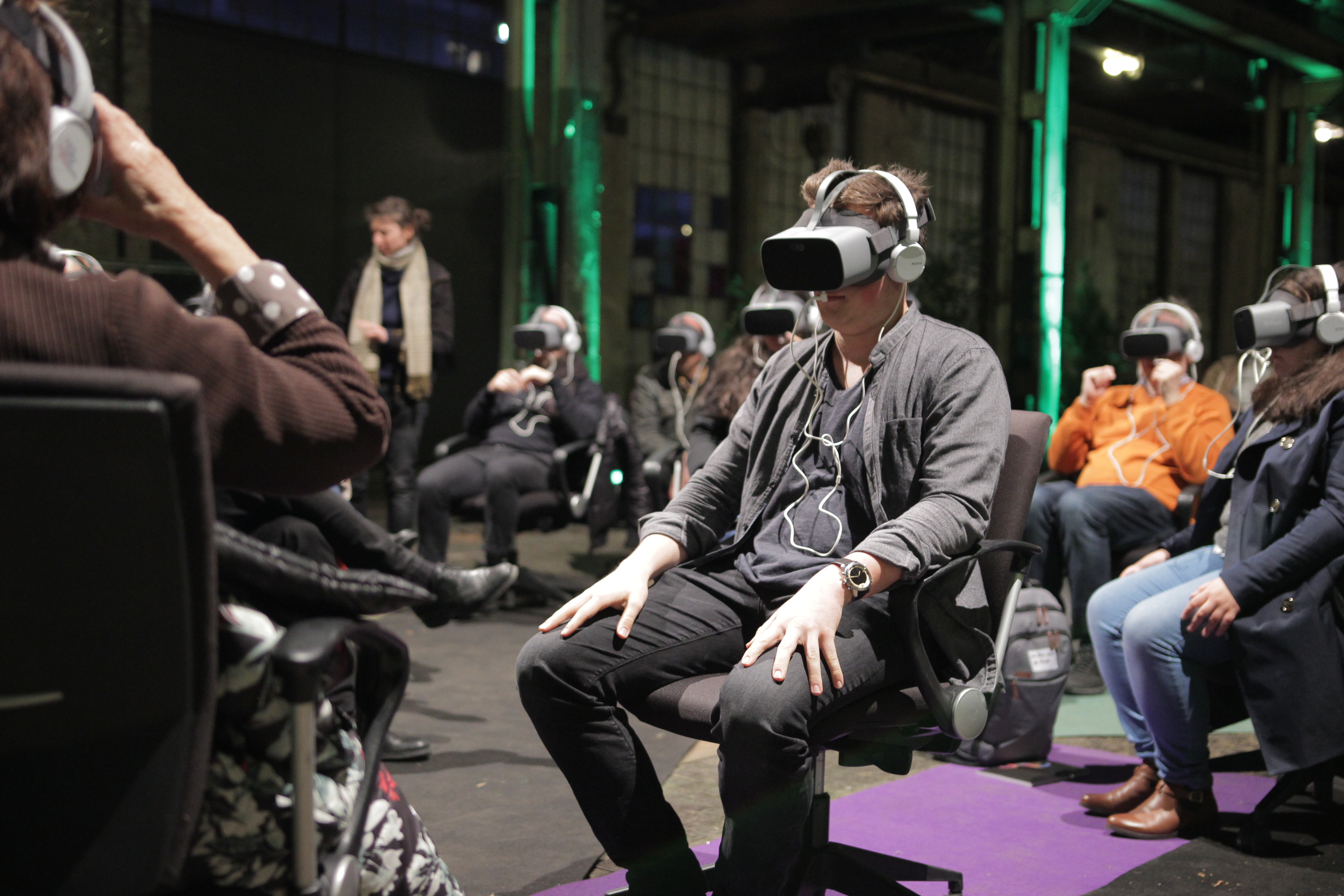
LICHTER Filmfest VR Screening 2019

2019

- Regional Feature Film: Khrustal by Darya Zhuk
- Regional Short Film: We will survive by Nele Dehnenkamp
- Audience Award Feature Film: The Watson's Hotel by Peter Rippl, Ragunath Vasudevan und Nathaniel Knop
- LICHTER Art Award: WEIGHT by Andrew de Freitas
- Virtual Reality Storytelling Award: The Real Thing by Benoit Felici

2020

- Regional Feature Film: LIVE by Lisa Charlotte Friederich
- Regional Short Film: Nachtschicht by David Dybeck
- Audience Award Short Film: Die Vergänglichkeit des Bernd Hasselhuhn by Max Rainer
- LICHTER Art Award: Fossil Place by Florencia Levy
- VR Storytelling Award: Aripi by Dmitri Voloshin

2021

- Regional Feature Film: street line by Justin Peach und Lisa Engelbach
- Regional Short Film: MILK by Jennifer Kolbe
- LICHTER Art Award: MOTOR by Frankfurter Hauptschule
- Special mention from the jury: Trübe Wolken by Glenn Büsing und Christian Schäfer
- LICHTER VR Storytelling Award: Replacements – Penggantian by Jonathan Hagard

2022

- Regional Feature Film: Als Susan Sontag im Publikum saß by RP Kahl
- Regional Short Film: 21:71 Uhr by Joey Arand
- LICHTER Art Award: Soum by Alice Brygo
- LICHTER VR Storytelling Award: Lockdown Dreamscape VR by Nicolas Gebbe
- Audience Award: On the Other Side (Del Otro Lado) by Iván Guarnizo

2023

- Regional Feature Film: Einzeltäter Teil 3 – Hanau by Julian Vogel & Fitness California – Wie man die Extra Meile geht by Nadine Zacharias
- Regional Short Film: Поки тут тихо. (It is quiet here.) by Olena Podolianko & Novruz Hikmet
- LICHTER Art Award: Machines Don't Die by Eunhee Lee
- LICHTER VR Storytelling Award: You Destroy. We create | The war on Ukraine’s culture by Felix Gaedtke & Gayatri Parameswaran
- Audience Award: Elaha by Milena Aboyan

2024

- Regional Feature Film: Ellbogen – Hanau by Aslı Özarslan
- Regional Short Film: Gaze in battle by Ayla Pierrot Arendt
- Newcomer Prize of Filmhaus Frankfurt: Die nackte Wahrheit by Lena Grobusch
- LICHTER Art Award: Landen by Vanessa Nica Müller
- LICHTER VR Storytelling Award: GANGA by Carol Liu
- LICHTER VR Interactive Storytelling Award: JFK Memento by Chloé Rochereuil
- Jury Prize of Evangelische Filmarbeit: Filmstunde_23 by Edgar Reitz, Jörg Adolph
- Audience Award: Frank Meyer by Leonhard Hofmann, Riccardo Dejan Jurkovic

2025

- Regional Feature Film: Das deutsche Volk by Marcin Wierzchowski
- Regional Short Film: Monika by Geeske Janßen
- Newcomer Prize of Filmhaus Frankfurt: Diana's Poem by Dani Rose Cortés
- LICHTER Art Award: I would have liked to make a different film by Suse Itzel
- LICHTER VR Storytelling Award: Sweet End of the World! by Stefano Conca Bonizzoni
- Jury Prize of Evangelische Filmarbeit: Das deutsche Volk by Marcin Wierzchowski
- Audience Award: Kill The Jockey by Luis Ortega

== Juries ==
A jury of filmmakers and film experts decides on the winners of the regional categories "Best Feature Film" and "Best Short Film." Since 2016 there is also the category "Best International Feature." Former jury members:

2008

- Birgit Lehmann (director), Bahman Kormi (cinematogropher), Sebastian Popp (film producer)

2009

- Rudolf Worschech (film editor), Rembert Hüser (film scholar), Martina Elbert (director)

2010

- Astrid Rieger (director), Christiane von Wahlert (managing director Freiwillige Selbstkontrolle der Filmwirtschaft), Michael Wiedemann (department head at Film- und Medienstiftung NRW and head of Kinofests Lünen)

2011

- Maryam Zaree (actress), Cyril Tuschi (director), Daniel Kothenschulte (film critic)
- LICHTER Art Award: Judith Hopf, Saul Judd, Matthias Ulrich

2012

- Bettina Buchler (acting director Filmbewertungsstelle), Peter Dörfler (director), Anke Sevenich (actress)
- LICHTER Art Award: Mike Bouchet, Saul Judd, Sophie von Olfers

2013

- Pia Marais (director), Florian Koerner von Gustorf (film producer), Matthias Luthardt (director)
- LICHTER Art Award: Saul Judd, Felix Ruhöfer, Simon Starling

2014

- Regional Feature Film: Hans Robert Eisenhauer (film producer), Jakob Preuss (documentary filmmaker), Gaby Babic (director of "goEast – Festival des mittel- und osteuropäischen Films")
- Regional Short Film: Toby Ashraf (film journalist), Oona Lea von Maydell (actress), Tidi von Tiedemann (producer)
- LICHTER Art Award: Peter Gorschlüter, Karola Gramann, Saul Judd

2015

- Regional Feature Film: Christoph Thoke (film producer), Tatjana Turanskyj (director, film producer, screenwriter and actress), Anne Ratte-Polle (actress)
- Regional Short Film: Martina Valentina Baumgartner (film producer), Stefan Kriekhaus (screenwriter), Achim Forst (film editor)
- LICHTER Art Award: Katharina Dohm, Saul Judd, Tasja Langenbach

2016

- Regional Short Film: Isabel Berghout, Lili Kobbe, Hendrik Schmitt
- Regional Feature Film: Stipe Erceg, Linda Söffker, Nico Sommer
- International Feature Award: Max Linz, Barbara Schweizerhof, Hermann Vaske
- LICHTER Art Award: Saul Judd, Fabian Schöneich, Vivian Trommer

2017

- Regional Short Film: Robert Hertel (film producer), Sylve Hohlbaum (director), Christel Schmidt (film editor)
- Regional Feature Film: Numan Acar (actor), Reza Brojerdi (actor and film producer), Pepe Danquart (film director), Mischka Popp (film director)
- International Feature Award: Niko Apel (film director), Nicole Baum (film editor), Betty Berr und Rainer Wothe (festival directors)
- LICHTER Art Award: Saul Judd, Olaf Stüber, Mathilde Ter Heijne
- VR Storytelling Award: Astrid Kahmke, Eckart Köberich, Kay Meseberg, Marco Heutink, Ralph Benz

2018

- Regional Short Film: Andreas Heidenreich, Lilo Mangelsdorff, Peter Rippl
- Regional Feature Film: Uwe B. Carstensen, Carolin Weidner, Julia Zange
- International Feature Award: Giacomo Abbruzzese, Uri Aviv, Simon Stadler
- LICHTER Art Award: Stefanie Böttcher, Sergey Harutoonian, Saul Judd
- VR Storytelling Award: Tomislav Bezmalinoviv, Vanessa Kincaid, Eckart Köberich

2019

- Regional Short Film: Isabel Gathof, Jonatan Schwenk, Ralph Förg
- Regional Feature Film: Birgit Gamke, Jenny Schily, Susanne Heinrich
- LICHTER Art Award: Tamara Grcic, Christina Lehnert, Saul Judd
- VR Storytelling Award: The Real Thing, Benoit Felici

2020

- Regional Short Film: Rolf Silber, Dr. Catherine Colas, Daniel Popat
- Regional Feature Film: Anatol Schuster, Margrit Schreiber-Brunner, Ernst Szebedits
- LICHTER Art Award: Natasha A. Kelly, Gerhard Wissner Ventura, Saul Judd
- VR Storytelling Award: Ioana Matei, Kirsty van der Plas, Susanne Ahmadseresht

2021

- Regional Short Film: Simone Wagner, Dennis Mill, Hannes Kranich
- Regional Feature Film: Anna Böger, Connie Walther, Sebastian Brose
- LICHTER Art Award: Jeremy Shaw, Carina Bukuts, Saul Judd
- VR Storytelling Award: Jimmy Cheng, Rahel Demant, Georgy Molodtsov

2022

- Regional Short Film: Alexandra Gramatke, Karl Eberhard Schäfer, Peter Meister
- Regional Feature Film: Antonia Kilian, Barbara Philipp, Jakob Zimmermann
- LICHTER Art Award: Christin Müller, Gunter Deller, Saul Judd
- VR Storytelling Award: Agata Di Tommaso, Michael Gödde, Mathias Fournier

2023

- Regional Short Film: Lotte Schubert, Erin Högerle, Dennis Stein-Schomburg
- Regional Feature Film: Nikias Chryssos, Laura J. Padgett, Thorsten Schaumann
- LICHTER Art Award: Liberty Adrien, Britta Färber, Saul Judd

2024

- Regional Short Film: Luana Almeida Pees, Natascha Gikas, Nikita Diakur
- Regional Feature Film: Nils Menrad, Bella Halben, Wolfgang Richter
- LICHTER Art Award: Iryna Yaniv, Marie Oucherif, Saul Judd

2025

- Regional Short Film: Dascha Petuchow, Brigitte Maria Bertele, Jakob Zapf
- Regional Feature Film: Laura Klippel, Cem Kaya, Volker Beller
- LICHTER Art Award: Sarnt Utamachote, Jakob Sturm, Saul Judd

== Venues ==
The Lichter Filmfest Frankfurt International plays at several cinemas in Frankfurt and the Rhine-Main region. The following cinemas and locations have been used since 2008:

- Atelierfrankfurt
- Basis e.V.
- Caligari Filmbühne
- Cantate-Saal / Volksbühne im Großen Hirschgraben
- Cinestar Metropolis
- Comoedienhaus Wilhelmsbad
- E-Kinos
- Erster Stock
- filmklubb Offenbach
- Hafenkino Offenbach
- Harmonie Kinos
- Kino im Deutsches Filmmuseum
- Kino im Lederpalast
- Künstlerhaus Mousonturm
- Mal Seh’n Kino
- mmk Vortragssaal
- Massif Central / Massif Arts / Massiv E
- Murnau-Filmtheater Wiesbaden
- Naxoshalle
- Praunheimer Werkstätten
- Pupille - University Cinema
- Rex-Programmkino
- TOR Art Space
- Turmpalast
- Zoo-Gesellschaftshaus
- Basis e.V.

== Key Subjects ==
Since 2012, the international program and the accompanying program of the Lichter Filmfest focus on a specific key subject in its lectures, talk show panels, performances and experimental formats of discussion forums.

- 2012: Revolutions (Revolutionen)
- 2013: City (Stadt)
- 2014: Humor, comicality, and comedy (Humor, Komik und Komödie)
- 2015: Money (Geld)
- 2016: Frontiers (Grenzen)
- 2017: Truth (Wahrheit)
- 2018: Chaos (Chaos)
- 2019: Nature (Natur)
- 2020: Power (Macht)
- 2021: Change (Wandel)
- 2022: Freedom (Freiheit)
- 2023: Love (Liebe)
- 2024: Future (Zukunft)
- 2025: Fear (Angst)
- 2026: Art (Kunst)

== Honorary patrons ==
- 2013: Volker Schlöndorff
- 2014: Leander Haußmann
- 2016: Edgar Reitz
- 2017: Doris Dörrie

== Sources ==
- "Annarita Zambrano" (PDF). Visioni Italiane (in Italian). Fondazione Cineteca di Bologna. 2013.
