= Photo-text art =

Hybrid form of artistic expression

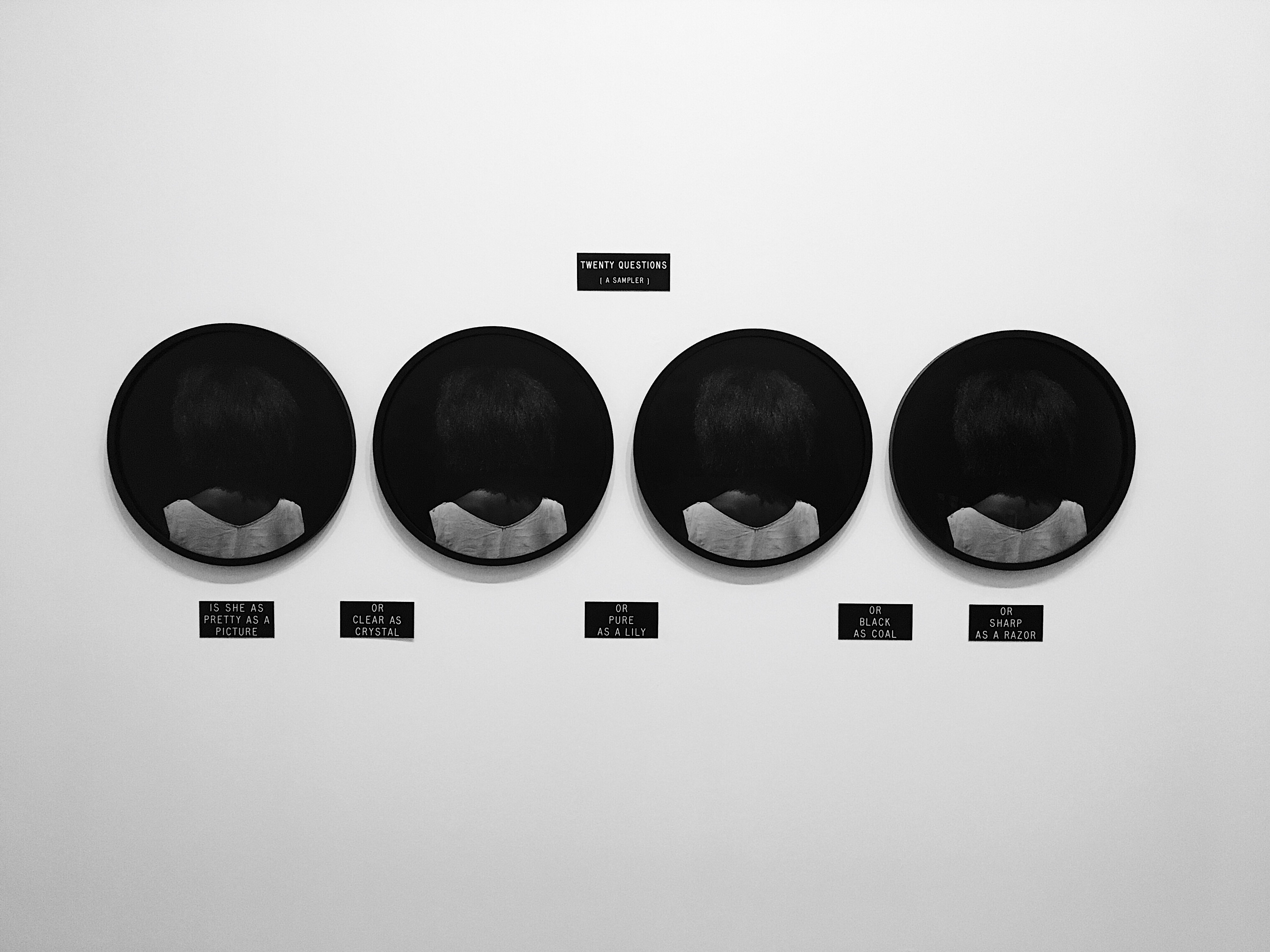
"Twenty Questions", by Lorna Simpson. An example of photo-text installation, in which a series of black and white photographs are shown alongside six engraved text plaques.

Photo-text, also written as photo/text, is a hybrid form of artistic expression that combines photography and textual elements to convey a message or create a narrative. This combination allows for a multi-dimensional experience for the viewer.

Notable examples of photo-text art include Martha Rosler's The Bowery in two inadequate descriptive systems (1974/75); David Askevold's Muse Extracts, exhibited at Documenta 6 in 1977; Carrie Mae Weems' Family Pictures and Stories (1983); Lorna Simpson's installation Guarded Conditions (1989); and Martha Wilson's I have become my own worst fear, first presented in 2011.

The summer photography festival Rencontres d'Arles gives a Photo-Text Book Award at each annual event.

== Overview ==
Photo-text has been classified as a "bimedial iconotext," wherein both photographic images and textual elements coexist, forming a cohesive body of work presented in the context of a gallery space or book.

The juxtapositional nature of photo-texts requires that they be simultaneously read and viewed together — an intentional coexistence. This dual engagement fosters the creation of new meanings while maintaining separate importance for both the photographic images and the written text.

In the realm of photo-texts, photographs and words work together, forming a "dialogue" where neither medium can escape the interplay. This dialogue, described as the "interpenetration of images and words," serves to enhance the narrative potential of each medium. The continuous shift between observing the images and reading the text results in the development of a conceptual entity known as a "third something," which exists solely in the mind of the reader/viewer. Ultimately, it is the viewer who "makes sense" of photo-texts. Before this "third something" takes shape in the observer's mind, the images and text must be assimilated by the mediating organ of the eye. This process involves the viewer incorporating or devouring the content, temporarily blurring the line between the written and visual components.

== Notable artists who work with photo-text ==
- Roberta Allen (American, b. 1945)
- Eleanor Antin (American, b. 1935)
- David Askevold (Canadian, 1940–2008)
- Theresa Hak Kyung Cha (Korean American, 1951–1982)
- Willie Doherty (Irish, b. 1959)
- Jochen Gerz (German, b. 1940)
- Paulina Lavista (Mexican, b. 1945)
- Laura J. Padgett (American, b. 1958)
- Martha Rosler (American, b. 1943)
- Allan Sekula (American, 1951–2013)
- Lorna Simpson (American, b. 1960)
- Carrie Mae Weems (American, b. 1953)
- Martha Wilson (American, b. 1947)

Danish Kuwait
