= Paulina Lavista =

Mexican photographer

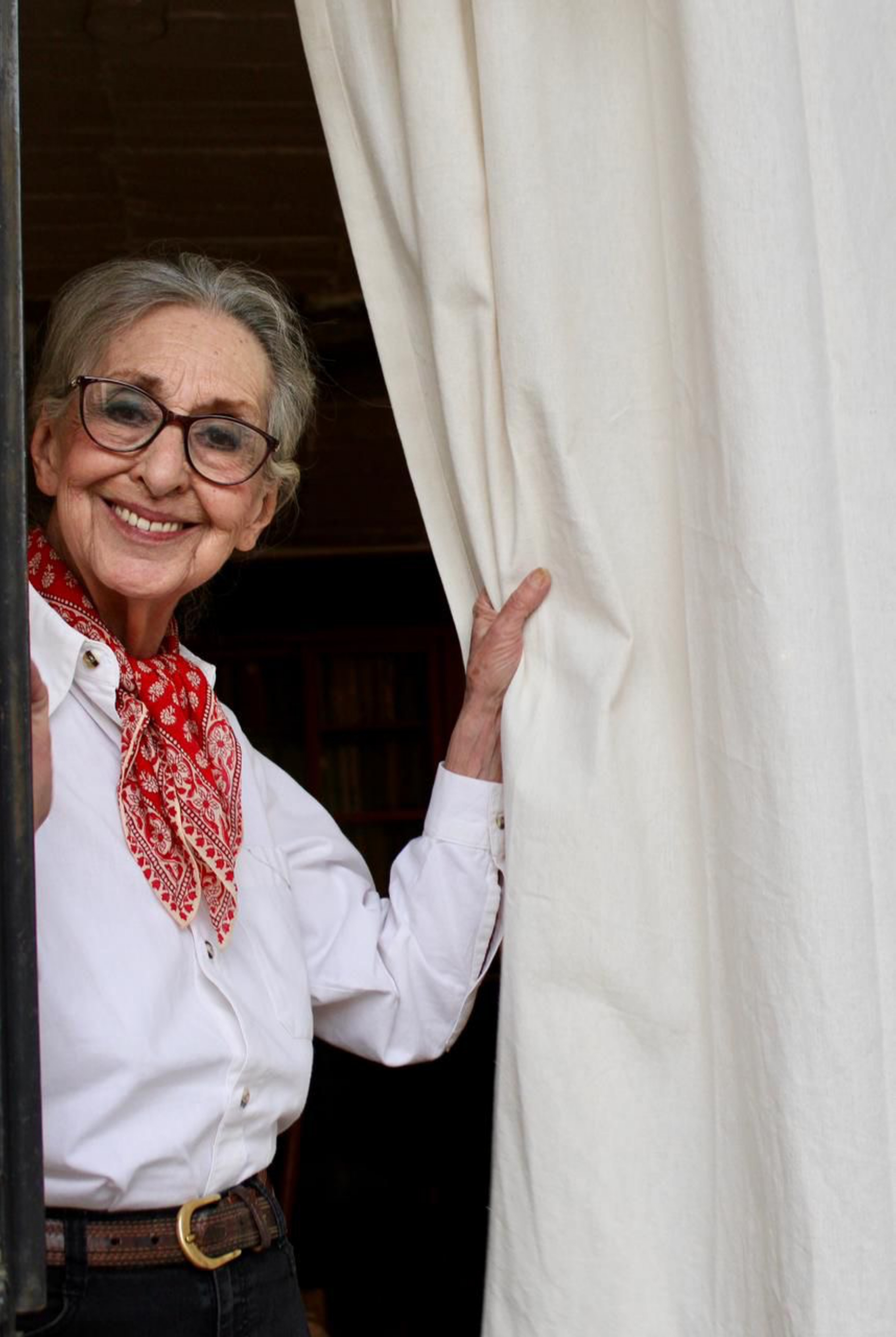
- Born: 18 June 1945 (age 81); Mexico City, Mexico
- Education: Centro Universitario de Estudios Cinematográficos
- Occupation: Photographer
- Partner: Salvador Elizondo
- Parent(s): Raúl and Elena Lavista

Paulina Lavista (born 18 June 1945) is a Mexican photographer, noted for her controversial work which has tested the limits of the field. She is the daughter of a composer and a painter, beginning a career in modeling and cinema before moving into photographic work in the 1960s. She began with portrait work, with one of her first clients being longtime partner Salvador Elizondo, and later breaking into more artistic work with a series of nudes for the magazine Su Otro Yo. She has photographed many subjects from the Mexican art scene as well as images of people in every day activity, mostly in Mexico. She is a member of the Salón de la Plástica Mexicana.

== Life ==
Lavista was born in Mexico City to composer Raúl Lavista and painter Elena Lavista. Her father composed music for the cinema and she grew up around music from Chopin to opera to Elvis Presley as well as the visual arts. She was the second of four children, with an older sister dying of typhoid fever. The children had a lot of freedom growing up but Lavista states that they were also alone because of their parents' demanding careers.

She thought of being a writer growing up but also remembers being fascinated by a photograph of a ballerina in mid-air.

She always had problems at school, attending middle and high school in five different schools before entering the Centro Universitario de Estudios Cinematográficos (CUEC). She was the first class of the new institution, with Jaime Humberto Hermosillo. However shortly after entering the family finances took a downturn and she decided to turn to modeling to earn money. She had success in this, appearing in commercials for chewing gum and hair dye. After this she worked in movie productions in the 1960s with Aldo Monti and then with Rafael Corkidi and Antonio Reynoso in their company Cine-Foto. This prompted her to return to CUEC to continue her studies. During this time she met photographers such as Juan Rulfo and Héctor García Cobo, which inspired her to explore photography. She continued with cinema, she worked on production of Fando y Lis by Jodorwsky and Mariana by Juan Guerrero. She was a production manager with Publicidad Ferrer and during the 1968 Summer Olympics she coordinated visual works.

In her early photographic career, one of her first clients was writer Salvador Elizondo, doing his portrait for the reissue of his 1965 book Farabeuf. They were a couple since then, until his death in 2006.

== Career ==
She was drawn to photography at age fifteen, dreaming of working for National Geographic or Playboy magazine. She became frustrated with the cinema industry and began to take portraits at age eighteen.

Her portrait work included images of Eduardo Mata in an easy chair in his house in Tepoztlán, Francisco Toledo in his studio, Rufino Tamayo in Los Pinos, Graciela Iturbide in the home of Manuel Álvarez Bravo and her father Raúl Lavista at his piano. She has photographed other notable figures such as Octavio Paz, Juan José Gurrola, Ofelia Medina, María Félix, Juan José Arreola, Jorge Luis Borges, Juan Rulfo, Gabriel García Márquez, and Emilio Fernández . She has also done a number of self-portraits, alone or with partner Salvador Elizondo.

In 1965, she began working with the magazine Su otro yo to create a series of nudes working with models and nightclub artists such as Lyn Mei, Gloriella and Rocío Rilke. In 1968 Lavista was the Assistant Production Supervisor for the 1968 film on the Olympic Games held in Mexico City that year.

Lavista had her first exhibition of her artistic photography, called Photemas, at the Palacio de Bellas Artes. Since then her work has been exhibited individually or collectively at the Museo Carrillo Gil, the Foro de Arte Contemporáneo, the Cada del Lago, the Salón de la Plástica Mexicana and the Chopo Museum all in Mexico City as well as at the Künstlerhaus Bethanien in Berlin . In 2013, the Centro Cultural Isidro Fabela Museo Casa del Risco in San Ángel, Mexico City held a retrospective of her work called "Momentos Dados." In that same year she was awarded the Medalla al Mérito Fotográfico (Photography Merit Medal) by the Sistema Nacional de Fototecas.

She is a member of the Salón de la Plástica Mexicana.

== Artistry ==
Although she is considered to be self-taught, she learned laboratory techniques at the Centro Universitario de Estudios Cinematográphicos. Although she has an intellectual approach to photography, often learning from contemporaries, she has also been controversial, provoking the enmity of colleagues, testing the limits of her field to avoid simply being a taker of images. Space constraints led her to develop two formats which she called historieta (lit.comic) and the other foto-texto (photo-text) over ten years. However, when they were exhibited at the Museo de Arte Moderno, there was controversy at the following roundtable, which concluded that these were not "photography." However, she did the same kind of work for an exhibition in 1991 at the Casa del Lago in Mexico City.

Lavista does diverse themes but movement is a prevailing element, shown in images such as that of ballerinas or flying birds. This reflects her admiration for the work of Eadweard Muybridge on locomotion and the movement in general of both animals and people in sequence. She is also noted for photographs of people in everyday scenes, mostly in Mexico City, but also in other areas of Mexico such as Alvarado, Veracruz, Tepoztlán, Guanajuato, various scenes in Quintana Roo as well as New York, Guatemala and Colombia. Fernando Gamboa wrote "Paulina Lavista's eys both discovery and invents worlds. Her poetic visual sensibility constantly stimulated into action, captures the calligraphy traced in heaven by flocks of birds, a quite extraordinary series of works."

She states that her artistic ideology is:

meditation on art and technology, the history of art in general and photography in particular, the ideas and concrete contributions of Muybridge and Cartier-Bresson, Barthés' concept of the event, the ideas of Salvador Elizondo on text and textualism, and masterworks of painting (Velázquez) and literature.
