= Anna-Schmidt-Schule =

Location
- District Westend: Gärtnerweg 29; 60322 Frankfurt am Main District Nieder-Erlenbach: Untere Burggasse 1; 60437 Frankfurt am Main; Frankfurt am Main; Frankfurt, Hesse; Germany
- Coordinates: 50°07′08.44″N 8°40′27.51″E

Information
- Type: Private school
- Founded: 1886
- School number: 5117
- Head of school: Petra König, Gerrit Ulmke, Marco Steinführer
- Grades: 1–13
- Gender: Coeducational
- Education system: Montessori
- Website: www.anna-schmidt-schule.info

The Anna-Schmidt-Schule (abbreviation: ASS; English: Anna Schmidt School) is a private school in the districts of Westend and Nieder-Erlenbach of Frankfurt am Main, Germany.

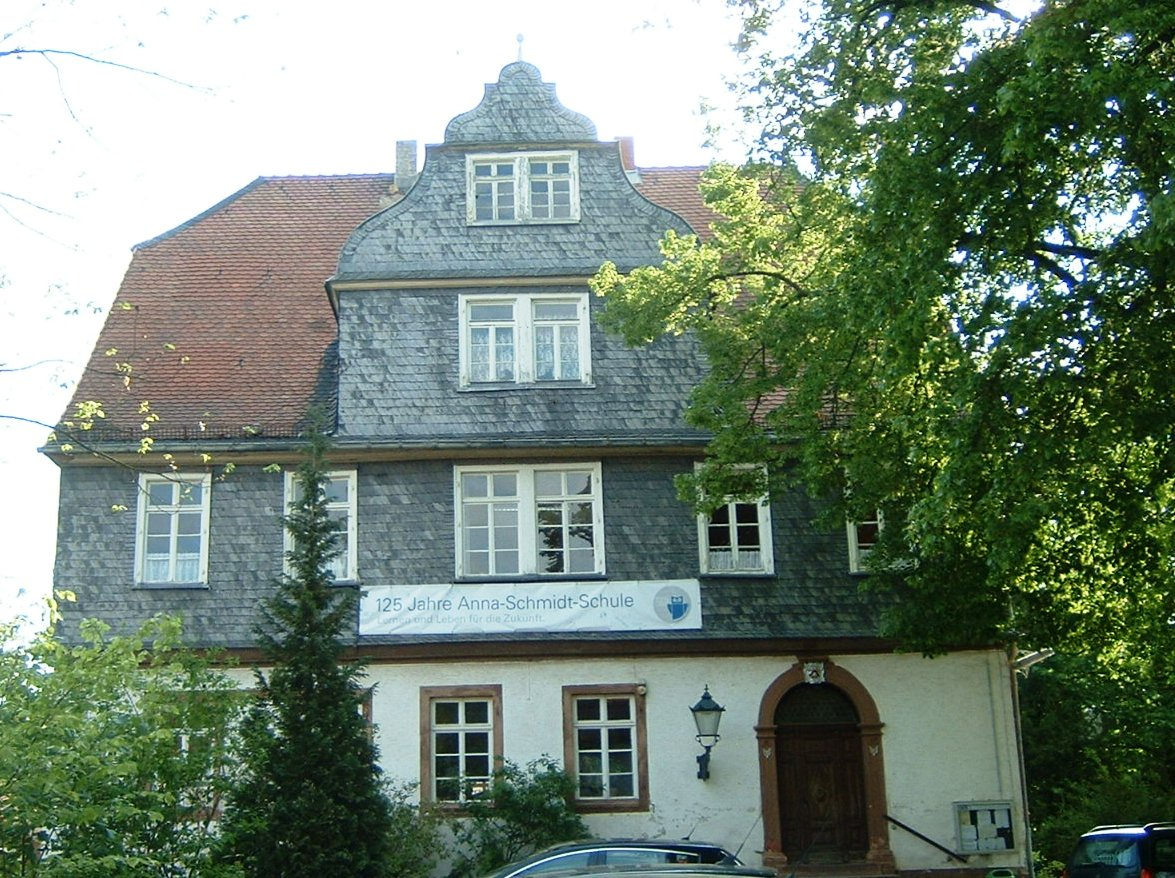
Administrative Building in Nieder-Erlenbach

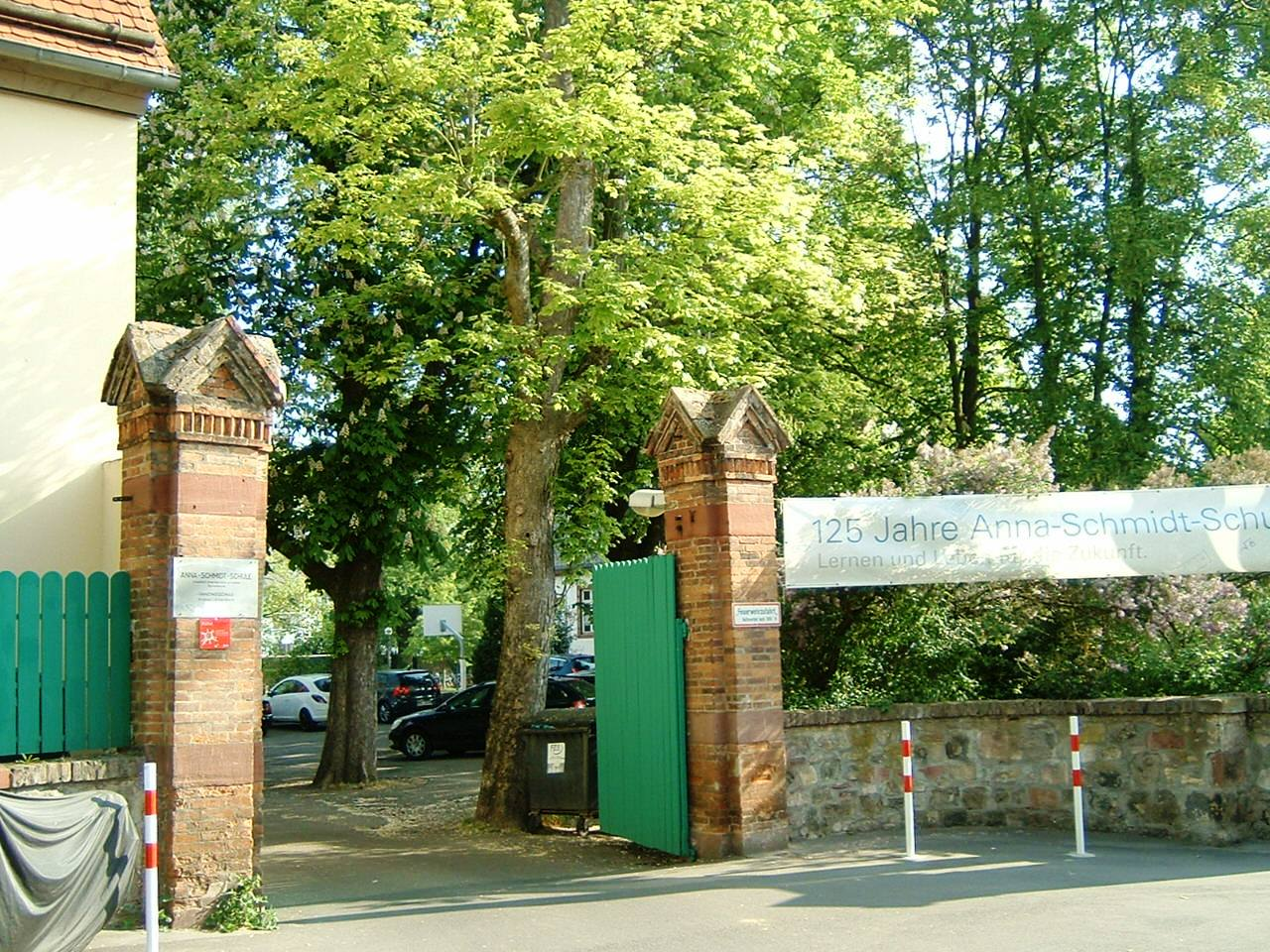
Entrance to schoolground

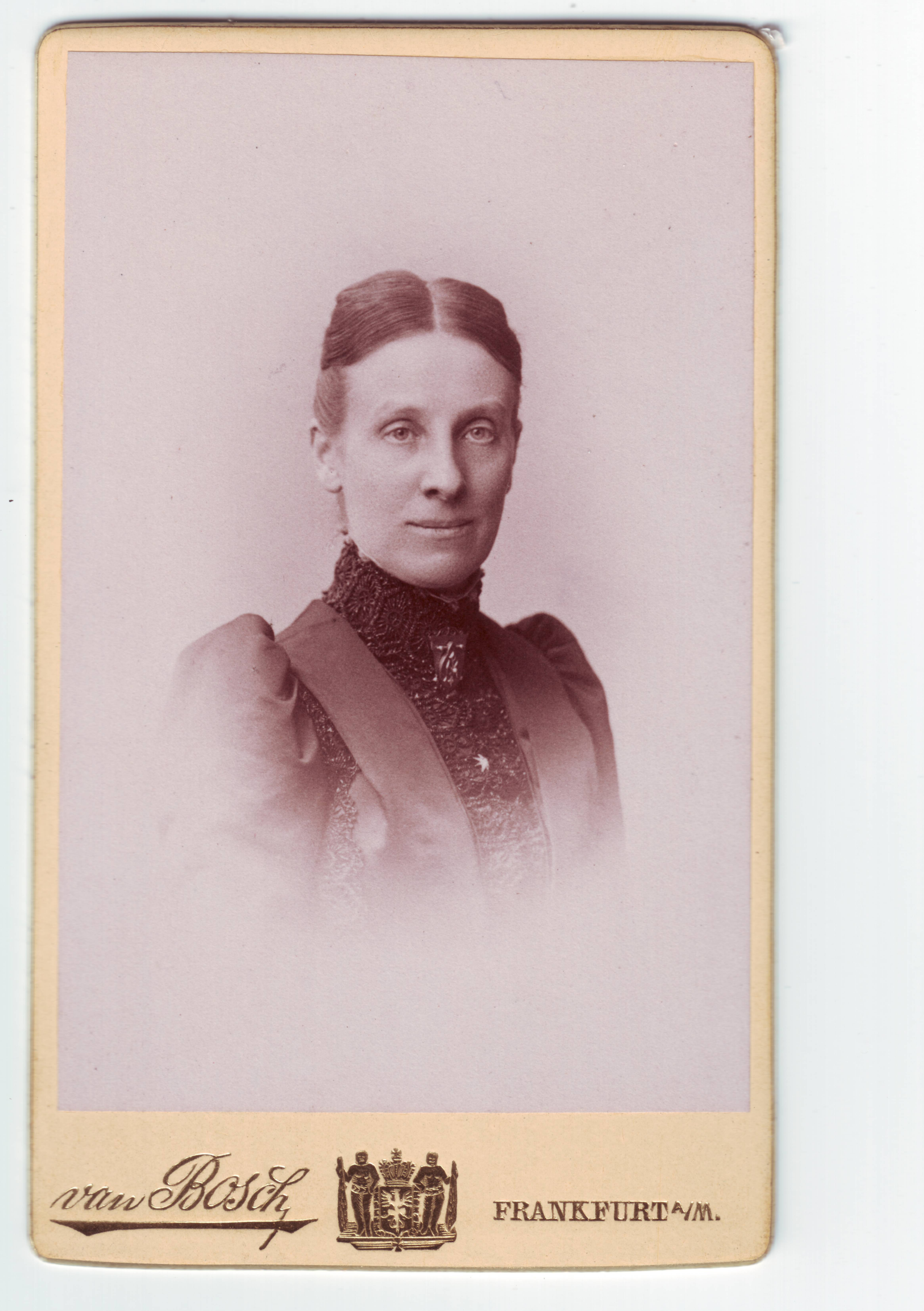
Anna Schmidt (April 1852 - Sept 1929

== History ==
The school is named after Anna Schmidt (1852–1929). Since 1979, it has been a UNESCO project school (UNESCO-Projektschule) and a full-time school. The school has approximately 95 teachers, 20 educators and 1,280 students.

In the academic year of 2003/2004, the duration of training to reach the Abitur was reduced to eight years, deviating from the usual procedure in Germany where secondary education ends after nine years.
