= Laura J. Padgett =

American artist

Laura J. Padgett (born 1958) is an American artist, working mainly in photography and film.

== Early life and education ==
Laura J. Padgett was born in Cambridge, Massachusetts. The artist studied painting at Pratt Institute of Art and Design in Brooklyn, New York from 1976-1980, receiving her BFA in 1980. Since 1981 she has been living in Europe. Padgett went on to study Photography and Film with Peter Kubelka and Herbert Schwöbel at the Städelschule in Frankfurt am Main, receiving her Master's in Art History from Frankfurt Goethe-Universität in 1994.

== Career ==
Since 1992, the artist has also taught at many higher education institutions in Germany, USA and Jordan, including the Bauhaus-Universität in Weimar, Hochschule für Gestaltung, Offenbach, Paderborn University, Drexel University and in the Theater, Film and Media Studies Department at the Goethe-University in Frankfurt am Main. She lives and works in Frankfurt am Main.

Padgett explores sites of historical and cultural importance through a variety of media, including film, photography, and text. By combining her creative process with research to gather historic knowledge, Padgett makes work that reveals the essence of a place while simultaneously presenting a subjective, contemporary perspective. Her work frequently exposes the tension between the enduring influence of history on the present and our attempts to alter, conceal or forget the past. Since 2018 she is represented by the Gallery-Peter-Sillem.

Since 1991, Laura J. Padgett’s work has been featured in numerous solo and group exhibitions in Germany and throughout Europe. Her photography has also been widely published. The artist's photographs accompany the essays by Peter Zumthor in Thinking Architecture (2006/2010/2012/2023). Between 2010 and 2012 Padgett followed the new construction and renovation of the Städel Museum resulting in the publication Raum über Zeit – Space over Time (2012). During this period of two years she created photographic narratives that capture time as the space in between. A selection of the photographs from the book are now in the collection of the DZ BANK Kunststiftung. Confined Space was published in 2016, showcasing photographs she made in Lebanon during times she spent there from 2011 to 2015. Her first publication with the Galerie-Peter-Sillem, Open Equations, appeared in 2019. Padgett's second solo exhibit with the Galerie-Peter-Sillem, Regenerating Permanence, is also accompanied by a limited edition publication of the same name. The work in this exhibition is a culmination of two years' photographing the Westend Synagogue in Frankfurt am Main. Padgett has recorded the special nature of this sanctuary and its history. Photographs from her series have been acquired by the Jewish Museum Frankfurt and were on view in the museum throughout 2024. Her photographic series Strata, produced in 2024, was first exhibited in the Galerie-Peter-Sillem and followed by her participation in the exhibition City of Women Photographers, Frankfurt 1844-2024 in the Historical Museum Frankfurt.

Padgett’s films have been screened internationally at venues like the Media City Film Festival, Detroit, Cité Paris, House of World Cultures, Berlin, Pharos Centre for Contemporary Art in Nicosia, the Centre Georges Pompidou in Paris, Mousonturm in Frankfurt am Main, Cineteca di Bologna, Künstlerhaus Kino in Vienna, Viper Filmfestival in Bern, Kunsthalle Erfurt and at the International Short Film Festival Oberhausen. In 2017 she received the Marielies-Hess Art Award. In the accompanying exhibition at the Museum Giersch of the Goethe University, she also screened her film SOLITAIRE (2017). A small selection of her films was presented at the San Francisco Cinematheque's CROSSROADS Film Festival, 21. August - 30. September 2020, curated by Steve Polta. In August 2021 her Film So, tell me about your garden. and a selection of her films from her From the Garden series were screened at the Deutsches Filminstitut Filmmuseum (DFF) as part of the Experimental Film program Im Garten. and in 2025 the DFF dedicated two evenings to her filmmaking. 2026 she participated in the screening Ecocinema in the Zeughauskino at the German Historical Museum (DHM), Berlin. She is part of the film series: Long Live the Underground! Celebrating Six Decades of the Film-makers's Cooperative and Millennium Film Workshop at Museum of Modern Art, MoMA. A selection of her films are distributed by Light Cone, Paris and Film-Makers' Cooperative, New York.

== Solo exhibitions (selection) ==
- 2026 Bliss, Galerie-Peter-Sillem, Frankfurt am Main
- 2024 Strata, Galerie-Peter-Sillem, Frankfurt am Main
- 2023 Regenerating Permanence, Jewish Museum, Frankfurt am Main
- 2022 Regenerating Permanence, Galerie-Peter-Sillem, Frankfurt am Main
- 2019 Open Equations, Galerie-Peter-Sillem, Frankfurt am Main
- 2017 Somehow Real, Exhibition in conjunction with receiving the Marielies-Hess Kunstpreis , Museum Giersch der Goethe-Universität, Frankfurt am Main
- 2016 Confined Space, Galerie Rautenstrauch in Onomato Künstlerverein, Düsseldorf
- 2016 Many Told Tales, Galerie Straihammer & Seidenschwann, Vienna
- 2015 Confined Space, Heussenstamm-Stiftung, Frankfurt am Main
- 2014 MONUMENT, Künstlerfahnenfestival, Eppingen
- 2012 Standardeinstellung, Neuer Kunstverein Gießen
- 2011 frames of reference, Galerie Martina Detterer, Frankfurt
- 2008 seeing things, Pharos Arts Foundation, Nicosia, Cyprus
- 2008 Holding onto things, Galerie Seitz & Partner, Berlin
- 2006 slow motion, Odakule Art Gallery, Istanbul
- 2005 inside-out, Galerie Seitz & Partner, Berlin
- 2004 vorübergehende Ortschaften, Galerie Martina Detterer, Frankfurt am Main
- 2003 conversation pieces, Städel Museum, Frankfurt am Main
- 2003 improbabilities, Galerie Seitz & Partner, Berlin
- 2001 morning glories, AusstellungsHalle Schulstrasse 1A, Frankfurt am Main
- 1999 common occurrences, KunstRaum Klaus Hinrichs, Trier
- 1999 marginalia, Goethe-Institut, Warsaw
- 1999 an enlightened Moment, Duchess Anna Amalia Library, Weimar
- 1998 systematic renewal, dirty windows, Berlin
- 1997 Foto / Text Work, KunstRaum Klaus Hinrichs, Trier

== Bibliography ==
- Laura J. Padgett: Bliss, published in conjunction with a solo exhibition in the Galerie-Peter-Sillem 17.01.-14.03.2026
- Laura J. Padgett: Strata, published in conjunction with a solo exhibition in the Galerie-Peter-Sillem 20.01.-16.03.2024
- Laura J. Padgett: Regenerating Permanence, published in conjunction with a solo exhibition in the Galerie-Peter-Sillem 15.01.-26.02.2022
- Laura J. Padgett: Open Equations, self published in conjunction with the exhibition of the same name at the Gallery Peter Sillem, Design Very, published with the support of the Frankfurt Culture Office
- Laura J. Padgett: Confined Space, Anja Katharina Rautenstrauch, Galerie Rautenstrauch und Anke Ehle-Barthel, Hrg. Bücher & Hefte Verlag, Leipzig. ISBN 978-3-9814530-5-8
- MADE FOR AROLSEN – Reise nach Arglosen, Bad Arolsen, 2016, Birgit Kümmel and Eva Claudia Scholtz, Hrg. ISBN 978-3-930930-38-8
- Laura J. Padgett: Raum über Zeit, Heidelberg/Berlin: Kehrer, 2012. ISBN 978-3-86828-278-8
- Peter Zumthor: Thinking Architecture Third Edition, by Laura J. Padgett ISBN 978-3-0346-0585-4
- Wie gemalt: Malerei ohne Malerei (Picture Perfect), Kai Uwe Schierz, Ed. produced by Kerber Verlag, Bielefeld
- Laura Padgett: Seeing Things, Nicosia: Pharos Foundation, 2008. ISBN 978-9963-9199-4-9
- Listen in Portikus, Portikus, Frankfurt am Main, 1992

== Awards and scholarships ==
- 2022 Neustart Kultur, Working Grant in Digitization_ Module D – BKM, NEUSTART KULTUR und den Deutschen Künstlerbund
- 2017 Marielies-Hess Kunstpreis
- 2013 Artists' Contacts, Lebanon, Institute for Foreign Relations (ifa), Stuttgart
- 2008 Photography Residency, Dover Arts Development, Dover, England
- 2004 Artists in Residence in Burgdorf, Switzerland from the Frankfurt Cultural Office
- 2001–2002 Studio Residency in London from the Hessian Cultural Foundation
- 1996–97 Studio Residency at Künstlerhaus Schloss Balmoral, Bad Ems
- 1978 Ford Foundation Grant in Painting
