= Martha Wilson =

American artist (b. 1947)

- Born: 1947 (age 78–79); Philadelphia
- Education: Wilmington College; Dalhousie University
- Occupation: Performance Artist
- Awards: Obie Award; Bessie Award
- Website: www.marthawilson.com

Martha Wilson (born 1947) is an American feminist performance artist and the founding director of Franklin Furnace Archive art organization. Over decades she has developed and "created innovative photographic and video works that explore her female subjectivity through role-playing, costume transformation, and 'invasions' of other peoples personas". She is a recipient of two National Endowment for the Arts fellowships, a New York Foundation for the Arts fellowship, and an Obie Award and a Bessie Award for commitment to artists' freedom of expression. She is represented by P.P.O.W. Gallery in New York City.

In the early 1970s while studying in Halifax in Nova Scotia, she began to make videos and photo/text-based performances. When she moved to New York City in 1974 she continued to develop and explore her photo/text and video performances. From this and other works during her career she gained attention within the US for her provocative characters, costumes, works and performances. In 1976 she founded and became director of the Franklin Furnace Archive, which is an artist-run space that focuses on the exploration and promotion of artists books, installation art, video and performance art.

== Education and early career ==
Wilson was born in 1947 in Newtown, Pennsylvania. After attending George School, a Quaker prep school in her Newtown, Wilson graduated cum laude with a B.A. from Wilmington College, a Quaker college in Ohio, in 1969. She then attended graduate school at Dalhousie University in 1971 in Halifax, Nova Scotia, Canada before starting her work teaching at Nova Scotia College of Art and Design (NSCAD) in Halifax—then a hotbed of conceptual art. She felt excluded from NSCAD's conceptual art community, which was reluctant to take her seriously as a woman and as a young artist. Like most of the art that was being made, taught, and encouraged at the school, Wilson first worked in language-based art.

== Career ==
She soon focused on performance art—using her own body as her medium. This choice further distanced her from her conceptual artist peers, who denigrated performance work on principle, upholding "the Cartesian subservience of the body to the mind."

She created photographic self-portraits called A Portfolio of Models, where she posed as many different gender types including: "Goddess," "Housewife," "Lesbian" and "Professional." By working with role-playing and masquerade, "the process of self-objectification was paradoxically experienced as positive, for it cleared a space which could be filled by her own self-determined visibility and agentic subjectivity." Wilson used make-up to create her transformation, when producing her face for her performance where she herself became a space for transcending gender norms and showing what people classify and expect from different female gender types. In Wilson's own words, "absence of self is the free space in which expression plays. Thus the 'obstacle,' the painted surface, is ironically the means of expression." In her early career, her work was mostly autobiographical. However, in recent years it has become much more less female subjectivity through her work in role-playing, transformations into different types of women through costumes and the use of other people's personas. In 1976 she became a member of Disband, an all-female group of performance and other artists that developed feminist songs. Through this work with Disband she created and developed the character of Alexander M. Plague, Jr. This character along with many others both fictional and real were used over her career including one of Barbara Bush.

=== Franklin Furnace ===
In 1974, she moved to New York City, where she changed the loft in her own house into an artist-run performance and exhibit space, founding Franklin Furnace Archive, Inc. in 1976. Between 1976 and 1996 Franklin Furnace held many different exhibitions in its storefront space on Franklin Street in Tribeca situated in Lower Manhattan. The Archive presented historical and contemporary exhibitions of artists books along with some installation pieces and art to the public. Franklin Furnace has since reinvented itself as a "virtual institution", where its main aim is to fund artists, focus on art education and the online publication of works not usually in the public's eye.

=== Disband ===
Disband, an all-female vocal performing artists group were based in New York City from 1978 to 1982, were formed by Wilson, IIona Granet, Donna Henes, Ingrid Sischy and Diane Torr. The band didn't see themselves are musicians, but instead a group of artists who performed using spoken word and noise, creating songs such as: "Every Girl", "Hey Baby", and "Fashions". The band's sound was that of a cappella, performing mostly at the storefront space at Franklin Furnace. In 2008 the group reunited and performed at the P.S.1 Contemporary Art Center, where they performed as part of "WACK! Art and Feminist Revolution," an exhibition put together by the Museum of Contemporary Art, Los Angeles. The group became increasing popular with feminists, especially those in the art world, who were like-minded and understood the lyrics.

=== I have become my own worst fear ===
P•P•O•W was founded by Wendy Olsoff and Penny Pilkington in the first wave of the East Village art scene in New York City in 1983. In 1988 the gallery moved to Soho and in 2002 to Chelsea. P•P•O•W maintains a diverse roster of national and international artists. Since its inception, the gallery has remained true to its early vision, showing contemporary work in all media. It also has a commitment to representational painting and sculpture and artists who create work with social and political content. Wilson has worked closely with this gallery showing her works/events and exhibitions here since joining in May 2011.

The works with the gallery are embedded with the ideas Wilson has been concerned about for four decades. Her work I have become my own worst fear, first presented in 2011, consists largely of photo/text images shown with a videotape Wilson made in 1974. The works consist of nine new photo/text works created in 2008 along with two early works in her career, Alchemy, from 1973, and My Authentic Self, from 1974.

== Performance and earlier exhibitions ==
Since the early 1970s, Wilson has performed and exhibited her work at various galleries and museums in New York City and elsewhere. In 1973, her Breast Forms Permutated was included in the "c. 7,500" exhibit of conceptual art made by women at the California Institute of the Arts in Valencia, California. In April of that year, she also performed Selfportrait at Project Inc. in Cambridge, Massachusetts. More recently, she was part of the "Gloria: Another Look at Feminist Art in the 1970s" exhibit at White Columns in New York City in 2002 and DISBAND was included in the WACK! Art and the Feminist Revolution exhibit at the Museum of Contemporary Art in Los Angeles in 2007 as well as the Incheon Women Artists' Biennale in Incheon, South Korea in 2009.

Her signature performance work is political satire, impersonating First Ladies Nancy Reagan, Barbara Bush and Second Lady Tipper Gore. In 2008 Wilson had her first solo exhibit in New York, "Photo/Text Works, 1971-1974" at the Mitchell Algus Gallery in Chelsea, New York City. In a New York Times review of the show, Holland Cotter asserted that Martha Wilson is one of "the half-dozen most important people for art in downtown Manhattan in the 1970s."

=== Staging the Self ===
From March until May 2009, an exhibition by Wilson and Peter Dykhuis for the Dalhousie Art Gallery in Halifax provided a deeper meaning and understanding of the work that she has created through a number of still images and constructed characters that surround the interpretations that one may have to a certain type of person. Wilson created photographic and video works that explored her female subjectivity through the extensive use of role playing, costume transformations and invasions of male and other female personas. This exhibition highlights the stages of Wilson's creative contributions (with the use of Franklin Furnace as all were archived there) within the context of early feminist and socially engaged studio practice as well as her dissemination of the work of like-minded individuals through the endorsement of Franklin Furnace. Central to the exhibition is Wilson's presence as an agent of transformative change, initially in her artwork and then her facilitation of cultural change through her directorial presence at Franklin Furnace. Her selection of 30 projects from 30 years of programming at Franklin Furnace also becomes a self-portrait of sorts as she highlights works that are historically significant for pushing boundaries within exhibition and display culture as well as society at large. The exhibition travelled to Leonard & Bina Ellen Art Gallery, Concordia University, Montreal, Quebec, Canada; Arcadia University Art Gallery, Glenside, PA; Pitzer Art Galleries, Pomona, CA; INOVA, Milwaukee, WI; Utah Museum of Fine Arts, Salt Lake City, UT; Fales Library and Special Collections of NYU and Pratt Manhattan Gallery, NY through 2013 under the auspices of Independent Curators International.

=== Selected performances and exhibitions ===
1972

- Captivating a Man

1973

- Posturing: Drag
- Posturing: Age Transformations
- Posturing: Male Impersonator, Butch
- Breast Forms Permutated
- Transformance: Claudia (in collaboration with Jacki Apple (with Anne Blevens), Plaza Hotel, Soho streets, and galleries, New York, N.Y.)

1974

- I make up the image of my perfection / I make up the image of my deformity
- A portfolio of Models: The Goddess, The Housewife, The Working girl, The Professional, The Earth Mother, The Lesbian

1975

- De-Formation (Whitney Museum of American Art and Downtown Branch at Federal Reserve Plaza, New York, N.Y.)

1976

- Co-founded Franklin Furnace
- Queen (Whitney Museum of American Art, New York, N.Y. and Oberlin College, Oberlin, OH)
- Rose (Artists Space, New York, N.Y.)
- Mudpie (LAICA, Los Angeles, CA)
- Ditto (New York, N.Y.)

1977

- Beast (University of Iowa, Iowa City, Iowa)

1978

- Story Lines (Whitney Museum of American Art and Downtown Branch at Federal Reserve Plaza, New York, N.Y.)

1980

- Disband (Museum of Contemporary Art, Chicago, Illinois)

1983

- Alexander M. Plague, Jr.(Princeton University, Princeton, New Jersey)

1984

- Nancy Reagan Runs for Office (Franklin Furnace and The Kitchen, New York, NY)

1985

- Just Say No to Arms Control
- Nancy Reagan at the Inauguration (P.S. 122, New York, NY)

1992

- Barbara Bush on Abuse

1994

- Tipper Gore: Advice for the 90's

2002

- Gloria: Another Look at Feminist Art in the 1970s
- Personal & Political

2005

- How American Women Artists invented Post-Modernism

2006

- The Downtown Show

2007

- WACK! Art and the Feminist Revolution

2008

- Martha Wilson: Photo/text works, 1971–74
- Looking Back: The White Columns Annual
- re.act.feminism

2009

- 40 Years 40 Projects
- Martha Wilson: Staging the Self

2010

- The Man I Wish I Was
- Donna: Avangurdia Feminista Negli Anni '70

2011

- I have become my own worst fear, P•P•O•W Gallery

2013

- Skin Trade, co-curated with Larry List for P•P•O•W Gallery

2014

- ADAA: The Art Show 2014, P•P•O•W Gallery
- RE-ENACTMENT Self-Portrait (1973)

=== Other events ===
- Staging the Self (Transformations, Invasions and Pushing Boundaries), September 17, 2011 at Book Launch and Artist Talk, Brooklyn Museum.
- New York Studio Event, March 30, 2011.
- Martha Wilson Dressing up and Poking Fun, in 'Mona/Marcel/Marge/, solo show, December 2015, at P.P.O.W.
- Martha Wilson, curated by Peter Dykhuis, opened at the Utah Museum of Fine Arts, in Salt Lake City on August 30, 2013. The exhibition explores current approaches toward feminism, identities, activism, and collaborative practice through Martha Wilson’s artworks and projects since the beginning of her career, forty years ago. Wilson worked closely with the Utah Museum of Fine Arts to deepen the exhibition in the local context, and create a new conversation engaging the local community. As the exhibition constantly evolves through each new venue, the Utah Museum of Fine Arts inserted Wilson’s own voice into the wall texts, changing the way the exhibition is narrated.,
- On November 7, 2016, Martha Wilson performed for a third time as Presidential Candidate Donald Trump but instead of assuming the character as she previously had done with other figures, Wilson plainly "highlight[ed] the intersection of the awful and the hilarious" by wearing obvious clothing and a wig that mimicked Trump.
- In January 2020, Wilson was part of Artpace's exhibit titled Visibilities: Intrepid Women of Artpace.

== Video performances ==
Wilson's works are mainly involved with image, not the image from the piece she has created but instead the image surrounding a topic or subject. An example is her work from 1974, "a portfolio of models", in which she creates a series of models through the understanding that one's self has itself the topic in question. The Housewife, The Goddess, The Working Girl, The Professional, The Earth Mother and The Lesbian are examples of Wilson's. This series of images are based upon one's stereotypical view of the subject matter.

There are many works of Wilson's consisting of image, body and video showcasing characters she has created to connect with many other realities; find below a list of her work.

- Premiere and routine performance: Halifax, Nova Scotia, Canada, 1972
- Art Sucks, Halifax, Nova Scotia, 1972
- Appearance as Value, Halifax, Nova Scotia, 1972
- Cauterisation, Halifax, Nova Scotia, 1974
- Deformation, Halifax, Nova Scotia, 1974

=== As Nancy Reagan ===
- For Oracle performance series at Exit Art, New York, 1985
- Nancy Reagan Beats Cancer, Sideshows by the Seashore, Coney Island, July 13, 1986
- Nancy Reagan Director, Atomic Gospel Hour, New York City, April 12, 1987

=== As Barbara Bush ===
- Upstream Arts, Staten Island C.T.V., March 11, 1991
- Separated at Birth New York City, 2003

=== As Tipper Gore ===
- Body Politic: Mental Health, Cooper Union, NYC, February 15, 1994
- Beauty and the Beast: The Weight Thing, Tacoma, WA, April 16, 1994

== Academic work ==
Wilson has lectured widely on the book as an art form, performance art, and "variable media art," at New York University, the School of Visual Arts, Nova Scotia College of Art and Design, and elsewhere. In 1997 she served as a guest editor at College Art Association's Art Journal, for which she wrote an article on the origin of performance art. Between 2003 and 2006, she served as guest editor of Leonardo magazine, for which she wrote an article on live art on the Internet. Wilson has received numerous grants for her performance art, such as two National Endowment for the Arts fellowships and a New York Foundation for the Arts fellowship. She has also received praise for her support of freedom of expression, including an Obie Award for commitment to artists’ freedom of expression.

As Franklin Furnace Archive's founding director, Martha Wilson is an important proponent of contemporary variable media. Franklin Furnace was once the largest collection of artist books in the United States and remains an important historical establishment for the still largely ignored artist book medium. Franklin Furnace Archive continues to support the contemporary avant-garde through funds awarded to under-represented artists creating contemporary work. The New York Times' Cotter and Karen Rosenberg have written that though the nonprofit organization and its archive may be Wilson's most prominent contribution to the arts in New York City, her early artwork holds an important place in the history of feminist, performance, and conceptual art.

=== 2011 events at Concordia University, Montreal ===
- Tour of the exhibition with her and curator Peter Dykhuis, January 19, 2011 at the Leonard & Bina Ellen Art Gallery.
- Performance and Identity, January 20, 2011 at the Leonard & Bina Ellen at the Art Gallery.
- Wilson offers her perspective on feminist research, February 19, 2011 at the Art Gallery.

== Selected grants and awards ==
- Honorary doctorate of Fine Arts, NSCAD University, Halifax, 2013
- Specific Object (NYC bookstore) publication of the year for Martha Wilson Sourcebook, 2011
- New York Foundation for the Arts Fellowship, Performance Art, 2001
- Citation by Robert S. Clark, Nathan Cummings, Joyce Mertz-Gilmore, Rockefeller and Andy Warhol Foundations for commitment to the principle of freedom of expression, 1993
- Bessie Award for commitment to artists' freedom of expression, 1992
- Obie Award for commitment to artists' freedom of expression, 1992
- Skowhegan School Governor's Award for Service to the Arts, 1991
- National Endowment for the Arts Fellowship, Performance Art, 1983
- National Endowment for the Arts Fellowship, Performance Art, 1978

== Books and monographs ==
- Martha Wilson Sourcebook: 40 Years of Reconsidering Feminism, Performance, Alternative Spaces, by Kate Fowle, Martha Wilson and Moira Roth. Independent Curators International, 2011. An anthology of writings from 18th century in literature to current texts, the Sourcebook is a collection of primary research material consisting of rare archival documents and excerpts of landmark publications that influenced Wilson, such as Simone de Beauvoir's The Second Sex, Erving Goffman’s The Presentation of Self in Everyday Life, Susan Sontag’s On Photography.
- Franklin Furnace and the Spirit of the Avant Garde: A History of the Future. By Toni Sant. Bristol, UK: Intellect, 2011. ISBN 9781841503714.
- Martha Wilson: Staging the Self. By Peter Dykhuis and Jayne Wark. 2011. ISBN 978-0-770300-28-9.

== Writings ==
=== By Martha Wilson ===
- "Going Virtual." Art Journal 59, no. 2 (summer 2000).
- "The Personal Becomes Political in Time." n.paradoxa no. 5 (2000): 83–90.
- Wilson, Martha. "What Franklin Furnace Learned from Presenting and Producing Live Art on the Internet, from 1996 to Now." Leonardo 38, no. 3 (2005): 193-200

=== About Martha Wilson ===
- Anon (2018). "Artist, Curator & Critic Interviews". !Women Art Revolution - Spotlight at Stanford. Archived from the original on March 26, 2018.
- "Old," "Crazy" and "Hysterical." Is That All There Is? by G. Roger Denson, Huffington Post, Oct. 5, 2011.
- "Martha Wilson: The Liminal Trickster" by Lauren Bakst, BOMB magazine, Oct 5, 2011,
- "Artist Martha Wilson at P.P.O.W., New York City: Aging Gracefully, with Political Consciousnes M. Gómez, September 10, 2011
- Reckitt, Helena and Peggy Phelan. Art and Feminism: Themes and Movements. London: Phaidon Press.
- "Martha Wilson: Not Taking It at Face Value," by Jane Wark, Camera Obscura: Feminism, Culture and Media Studies. Durham, N.C.: Duke University Press. ISSN 0270-5346 (print).

== Interviews ==
- Edgar, Anne. "A Conversation with Franklin Furnace." Afterimage 13, no. 1-2 (Summer, 1985): 28–30.
- "Interview with Martha Wilson, Co-Founder of Franklin Furnace Archive," by Claudine Ise, Chicago in Bad at Sports (November 8, 2010).
- Martha Wilson Speaks on Free Zones, by Felicity Tayler, Vague Terrain: Digital Art/Culture/Technology, March 21, 2011.
- !Women Art Revolution - Wilson, among others, was interviewed for this film
