= Pharos Arts Foundation =

The Pharos Arts Foundation is a Cyprus-based, non-profit cultural and educational organisation. Inaugurated in 1998, Pharos was the first active exponent of classical / chamber music in Cyprus, and it has been a remarkable pioneer in shaping the country’s cultural infrastructure. It was the Foundation that initiated in Cyprus the first ever chamber music festival, the first ever contemporary music festival, the first music-education program, as well as the first truly contemporary art-space. The Pharos Arts Foundation is directly dependent on private funding.

The Pharos Arts Foundation has created two venues to host its concerts and cultural events: The Shoe Factory and The Olive Grove.
