= Westend (Frankfurt am Main) =

Westend-Nord Westend-Süd
- Quarter of Frankfurt am Main
- Location of the Westend (red) and the Ortsbezirk Innenstadt II (light red) within Frankfurt am Main
- Interactive map of Westend-Nord; Westend-Süd
- Location within Germany Location within Hesse
- Coordinates: 50°07′05″N 08°39′48″E
- Country: Germany
- State: Hesse
- Admin. region: Darmstadt
- District: Urban district
- City: Frankfurt am Main

Area
  - Total: 4.092 km^{2} (1.580 sq mi)

Population (2020-12-31)
  - Total: 29,648
  - Density: 7,245/km^{2} (18,770/sq mi)
- Time zone: UTC+01:00 (CET)
  - Summer (DST): UTC+02:00 (CEST)
- Postal codes: 60308, 60320, 60323, 60325, 60327, 60486
- Dialling codes: 069
- Vehicle registration: F

Westend-Nord and Westend-Süd are two city districts of Frankfurt am Main, Germany. The division into a northern and a southern part is mostly for administrative purposes as the Westend (German: [ˈvɛstʔˈɛnt]) is generally considered an entity. Both city districts are part of the Ortsbezirk Innenstadt II.

The Westend with its Wilhelminian style buildings is a residential quarter and has the highest real estate prices in Frankfurt. Many old villas serve as offices for law firms and companies of the financial community. Along with the Bahnhofsviertel, the Nordend and the Ostend, it is part of Frankfurt's dense inner city districts.

== History ==
=== Western Boundaries ===
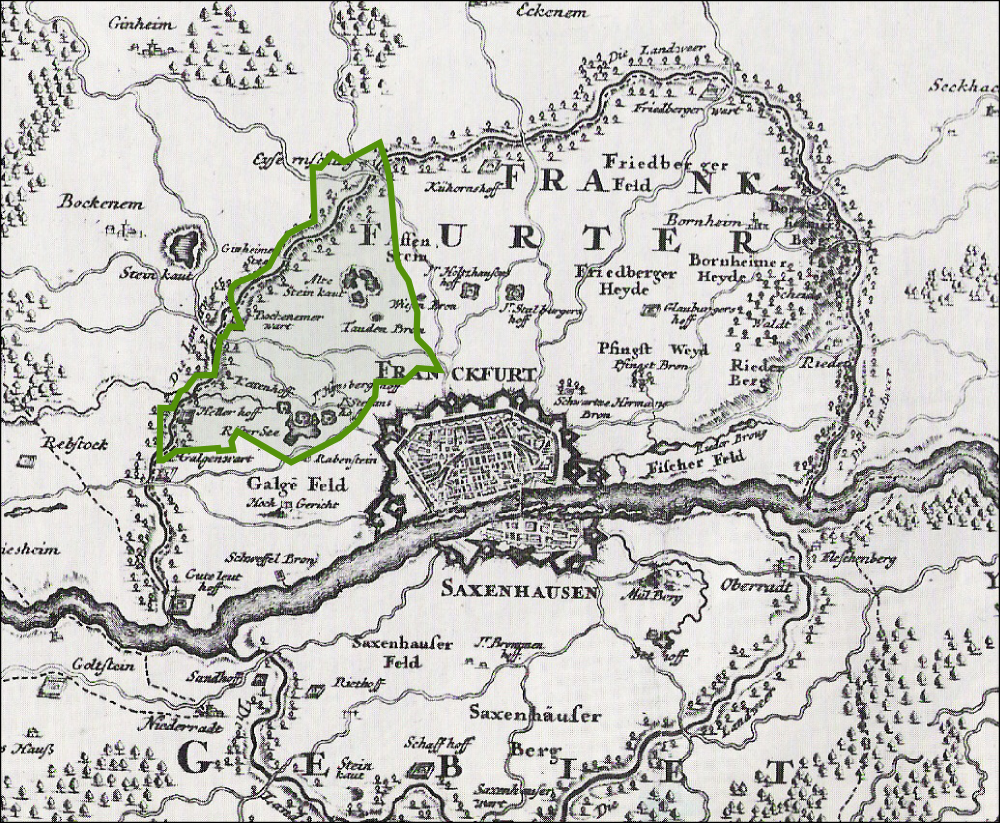
Borders of the Westend highlighted in green

Like the other districts constructed in the Wilhelminian period the Westend has been within the town walls of Frankfurt since the building of the Frankfurter Landwehr . Largely consisting of fields and heathland, it was area made up of isolated farming estates. Streets in the area still carry the names of these estates which were called Hellerhof, Hynsperghof and Kettenhof.

=== Classicism and the Wilhelminian period ===
At the beginning of the nineteenth century the old Frankfurt fortifications were razed. Soon numerous classic suburban villas with generous gardens sprang up along the Bockenheimer Landstraße, the arterial road in the neighbouring town of Bockenheim. Among them were the Gontardsche garden house and the Villa Leonhardi designed by the architect Nicolas Alexandre Salins de Montfort, as well as the Rothschildpalais of Friedrich Rumpf. Around the middle of the nineteenth century the area through the town was divided up and the streets and Squares were laid out. The narrow, built-up Frankfurter Neustadt was bursting at the seams and so people were continuously moving to the outer western town. Paris became an archetype for street construction, therefore wide boulevards as well as squares with radial streets leading outwards began to appear.

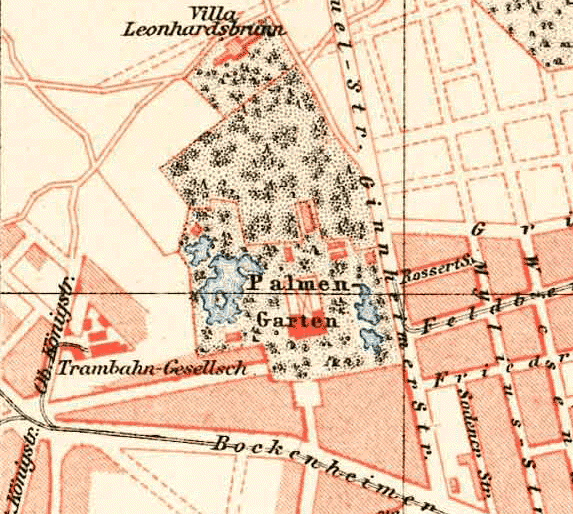
The quarter surrounding the Palmengarten (1893). The street network in the north of the Westend is still not finished.

In 1858 the first Frankfurt Zoo was laid out on the Bockenheimer Landstraße, which was later moved to the Ostend. The Westend then became a residential quarter for the affluent, as in other towns and cities with a Westend. Many villas and grand residential houses sprouted, of which many still stand today. At the end of the nineteenth century nearly the whole southern part of the Westend was built-up. In the northern part was the newly laid Palmengarten, the Grüneburgweg with its emerging Grüneburgpark as well as the Irrenanstalt (the so-called Irrenschloß, a psychiatric hospital) founded by Heinrich Hoffmann on the Affenstein. Around the well-contained development Mayor Franz Adickes had the Alleenring built at the beginning of the twentieth century, which at the same time bound all the new boroughs of the city together.

The northern borough was less densely built-up due primarily to the generously laid borders of the Grüneburgpark. In 1930 Hans Poelzig erected the IG Farben Building. Until the Second World War nothing else changed much. In the Third Reich the borough was abolished and the Westend became part of Frankfurt-Nord. Police station nine in Lindenstraße 27 was the center of the Frankfurt Gestapo. The Westend was spared from carpet bombing during the airraids of the second world war. Initially, after the war almost the whole Westend-Nord (from Wolfgangstraße) was declared a restricted zone. The American military set up their headquarters in the I.G. Farben building. Surrounding boroughs were converted into housing estates for GIs. In 1948 barbed wire was removed from the restricted zones.

=== Skyscrapers and street riots ===
In the 1950s the Westend was still a clean residential area for around 40,000 people. The houses had only four floors as a general rule.

==== The first skyscraper ====
In 1938 Frankfurt came upon the chance to purchase a 58-hectare area between Bockenheimer Landstraße, Unterlindau, Staufenstraße and Reuterweg at a very reasonable price, which had previously belonged to the well-established Jewish Rothschild family, land which the Nazi government had put into probation. Although the 1950 selling price was later improved, the return of a third of this area was demanded to be returned as part of the Rothschild inheritance. After this, approval of the construction of a multi-storey development on the Rothschild's returned land was received (they sold it to Schweizer Zürich-Versicherung and Berliner Handels-Gesellschaft) and office towers were established directly opposite the old opera house.

The Zurich building built in 1960, and demolished again soon after was the first multi-storied building in Frankfurt Westend. The city transformed the remaining part of the area into the Rothschildpark, which is accessible to everyone.

==== The abolition of housing space ====
After the abolishment of control of living space in 1960, Hans Kampffmeyer, the head of the social democratic planning department developed the concept of decentralising the inner city. The adjacent boroughs were to become an extension of the Westend. The so-called Fünf-Fingerplan of 1967 designated that through the Westend five leading axles – Mainzer Landstraße, Bockenheimer Landstraße, Reuterweg, Grüneburgweg and Eschersheimer Landstraße – should be developed under an intensive construction plan. From this came a wave of property speculation, and numerous nineteenth-century buildings were demolished in the following years, their long-established tenants driven out by rough methods. Several hundred houses stood empty in the Westend of 1970, often in completely shabby condition.

The development soon encountered resistance by the population. The middle classes reacted with the creation of the first Bürgerinitiativen (citizen's initiative), the Aktionsgemeinschaft Westend (AGW). The AGW put together a land register of monuments and buildings worthy of preservation and by 1970 obtained a modification ban for Westend. Henceforward, the city wanted to turn around the development plans for any newly introduced developments. 1972 saw the federal state of Hesse issue a regulation against dwelling misuse.

At the same time the Frankfurter Häuserkampf (house squatting) developed, which was mainly driven by students at the University situated in the Westend. Many houses were occupied, which received constant supplies to demonstrate on the streets with the police. Joschka Fischer was also involved in this. The high point of the Häuserkampf was between 1970 and 1974.

In 1972 an attack on the American headquarters in the I.G Farben building was carried out by the Red Army Fraction, in which a soldier died.

In the 1970s yet another row of multi-storey buildings were built in Westend such as the AfE-Turm on the university grounds. The City-Hochhaus at Platz der Republik, in those days the highest skyscraper in Germany (and burned down in 1973 to the jubilation of several students) was however finished later.

Although in 1976 a construction plan was decreed that no more skyscrapers would be planned, exceptions were approved in the southern part of Westend along Mainzer Landstraße and the Alleenring. Today the southern part of Westend has grown together extensively with the Bankenviertel. On the edge of Westend the second highest skyscraper in Germany, the Messeturm, rose up to 257 metres.

== Situation and demarcation ==
Westend lies at the northwestern border of the inner city and north of Bahnhofsviertel and Gallus. Its longest border separated it from Bockenheim to the west. To the north the Westend meets the borough of Dornbusch, and to the east of is Nordend. The northern border of Westend is identical to that of the former Frankfurter Landwehr, which protected the territory of the free city of Frankfurt for centuries.

Normally the people of Frankfurt say Westend is hemmed in by Reuterweg, the Bockenheimer Anlage at the Opernplatz, the Taunusanlage, Mainzer Landstraße up to Platz der Republik, Friedrich-Ebert-Anlage, Senckenberganlage, a small piece of Zeppelinallee, then from the southern boundary of the Palmengarten, Siesmayerstraße, Grüneburgweg up to its bend in the south east and Fürstenbergerstraße to the corner of Reuterweg.

The official urban districts of Frankfurt are not covered completely by these borders. According to these the whole Messe (fair) grounds, except in the west border area of Bockenheim and in the east of the district up to Eschersheimer Landstraße, also belongs to Westend.

== Townscape ==
=== Skyscrapers in Westend-Süd ===
The western part of the Innenstadt, the eastern part of the Bahnhofsviertel and the southern part of the Westend form Frankfurt's central business district, the Bankenviertel. The concentration of skyscrapers here is higher than anywhere else in Germany. The skyscrapers which are located in the Westend line up from the Bockenheimer Anlage via the Taunusanlage and Mainzer Landstraße to Platz der Republik. From east to west along this stretch are the Parktower (115 m), the Opernturm (170 m) the Deutsche Bank Twin Towers (each 155 m), the Trianon (186 m), the Frankfurter Büro Center (142 m), the Westend Tower (208 m) and the City-Haus (142 m).

There are more tall buildings at the Messe grounds: the world-renowned Messeturm (257 m, the tallest skyscraper in Europe between 1991 and 1997), the Westend Gate (159 m, the tallest skyscraper in Germany between 1976 and 1977).

== Infrastructure ==
=== Traffic ===
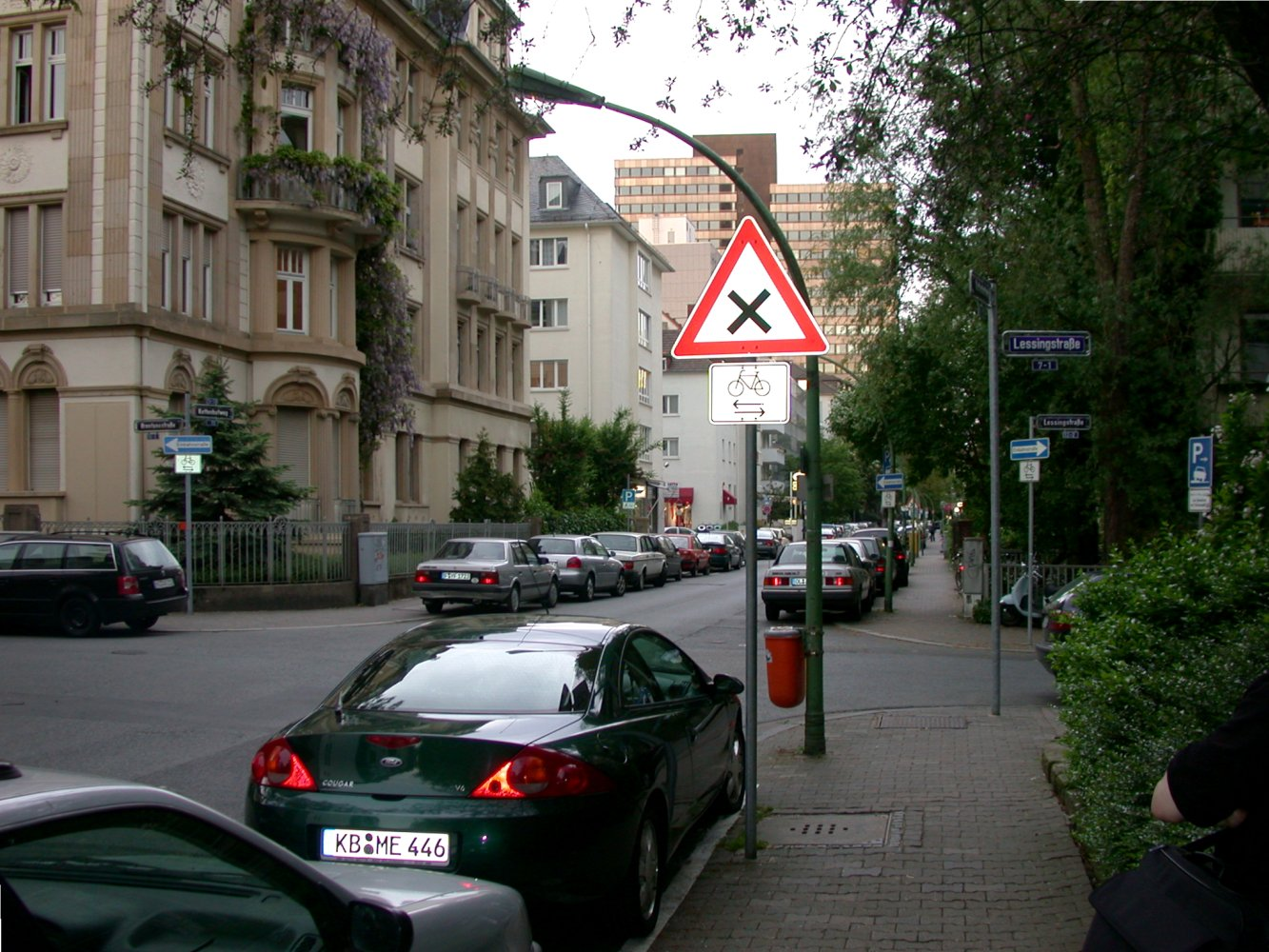
One-way street in the Westend

As a predominantly residential area the Westend mainly has narrow roads, which are calm in relation to traffic. Apart from a few exceptions all the roads are one-way streets, which change directions at cross roads. Therefore, the Westend is much loved by driving schools. The exceptions are streets which lead out of the Westend borough into other parts of the city. Initially these streets are Eschersheimer Landstraße, the Anlagenring and the Alleenring, which carry a majority of the rush-hour and Messe traffic. Other important traffic-bearing streets are Bockheimer Landstraße as the main street to the Messe lying in an east-west direction, and the fairway made up of Reuterweg, Bremer Straße and Hansaallee as an arterial road in the North and Grüneburgweg as another east-west connection. Apart from that Grüneburgweg is also the Westend-Nord Westend-Süd border.

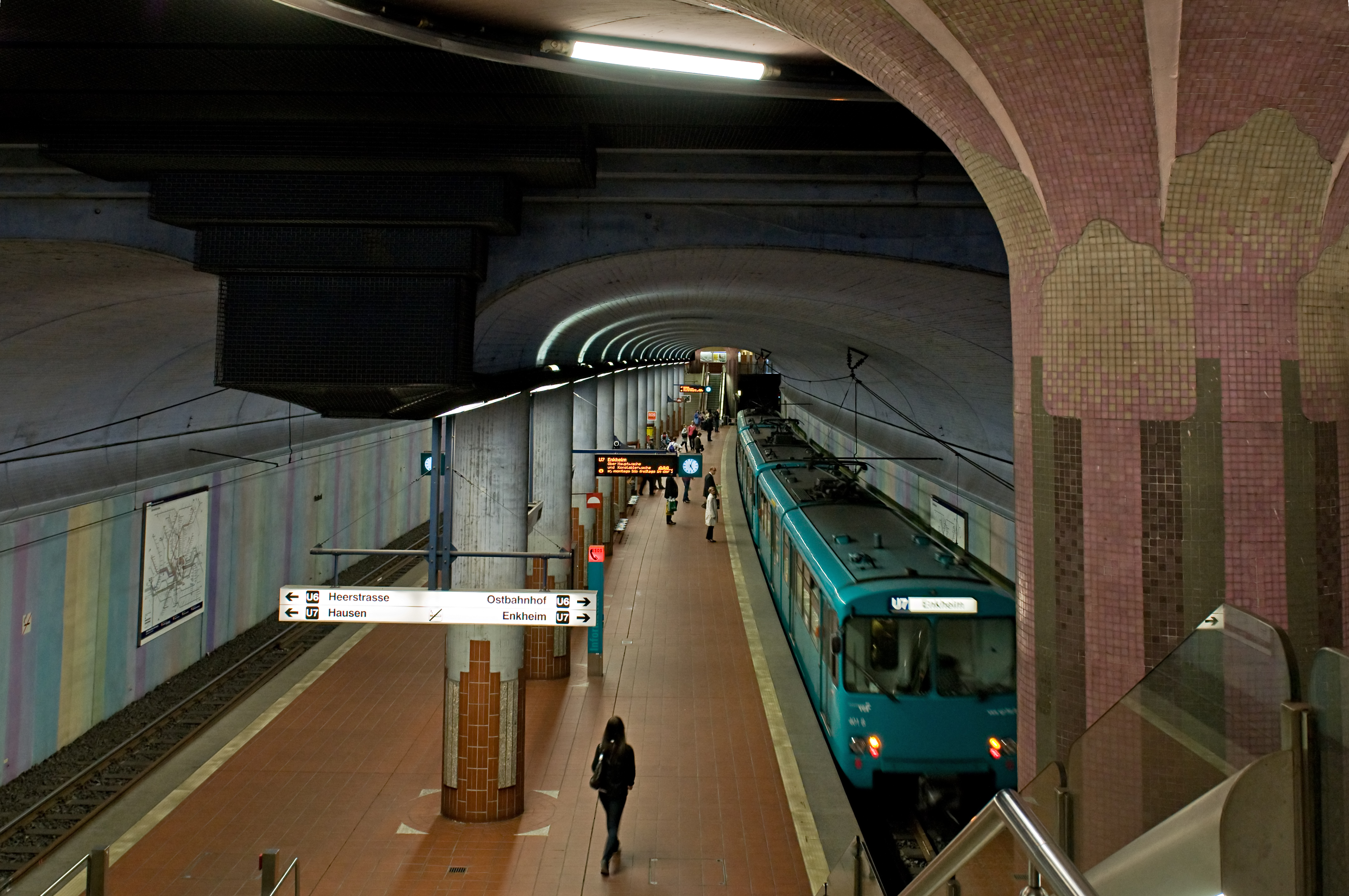
U-Bahnhof Westend

The Westend was one of the first boroughs with a connection to the tram network. In those days the main route lead through Bockenheimer Landstraße. Since the building of the C-route of the Frankfurt U-Bahn the Westend still only had Messe line 16, which travels through the western edge and over the Alleenring. The Westend was also attached to the underground from its very beginning. The A-route traffic ran through a tunnel under Eschersheimer Landstraße. The Westned had another U-Bahn route since 1986 underneath Bockenheimer Landstraße. The C-route runs from the Alte Oper to Bockenheimer Warte. A third U-Bahn route was added in 2001. The D-route runs underneath the Alleenring and serves the eastern Messe grounds. A railway junction developed at Bockenheimer Warte. Through the stations at Taunusanlage in the east and Messe in the west, the Westend is also linked into the Network of the Rhine-Main S-Bahn.

=== Public services ===
Despite the high population density and the good traffic infrastructure the Westend has no hospitals, fire departments or police stations. All emergency services are however located close by in Nordend. In contrast the Westend has many superior educational facilities available. Near to the university the Westend has the Frankfurter Musikhochschule and the Sigmund-Freud-Insitut. Numerous schools can be found in the Westend of which several of primary schools (Elsa Brandström-Schule, Engelbert Humperdinck-Schule und Holzhausenschule), the I.E. Lichtigfeld-Schule of the Jewish community, a private school (Anna-Schmidt-Schule) and several grammar schools:

- Bettinaschule is a grammar school with an emphasis on modern languages. It was founded in 1898 under the name Viktoriaschule as a higher girls school and renamed after Bettina von Arnim in 1947.
- The Goethe grammar school was separated in 1897 as a Realgymnasium (an old special type of grammar school which no longer exists) from the urban high school created in 1520.
- The classical Lessing grammar school likewise developed in 1897. It continues the humanistic tradition of the old Frankfurt grammar schools. The school building has been situated in Hansaallee in the Westend since 1902.

== Economy ==
Korean Air operates its Germany office in the district.

== Places of interest ==
=== Campus Bockenheim of Goethe University and Senckenberg Museum ===
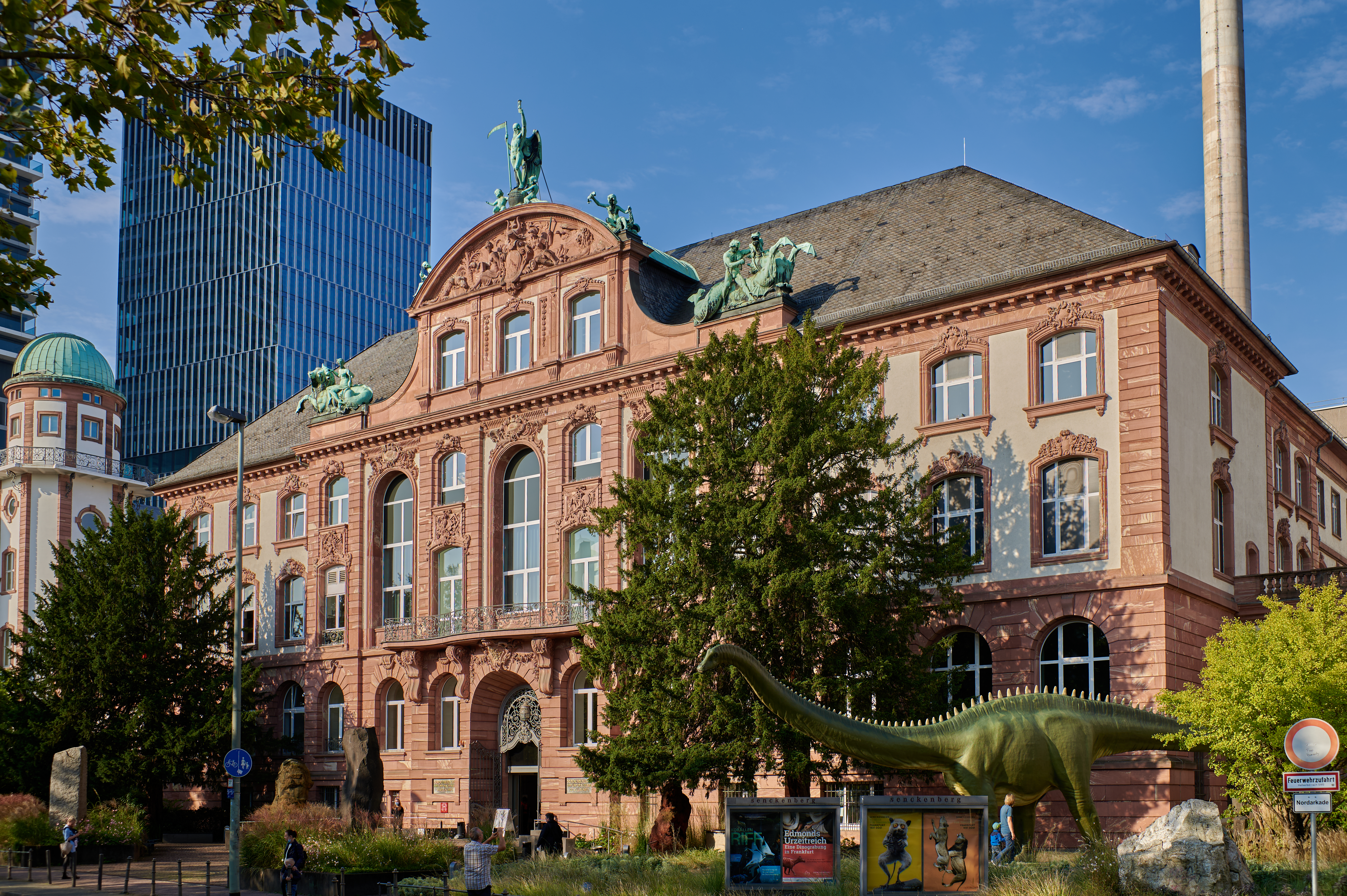
Naturmuseum Senckenberg

Along the Senckenberganlage from Georg-Voigt-Straße to Bockenheimer Warte lies the Campus Bockenheim of Johann Wolfgang Goethe University. The buildings still date from the start of the university or further back in time.

The construction of the Senckenberg Museum is also impressive. It was erected for the Senckenberg natural sciences society from 1904 to 1907 from plans by Ludwig Neher. The museum was erected in the tradition of the baroque castles. The has a facade, which captivates through the building of wings for the Physical Association and the Senckenberg library in the form of open arcades.

=== Amerikahaus ===
The building, (known as "Haus der Völkerfreundschaft" to the locals) inaugurated in 1958 on the corner of Reuterweg and Staufenstraße, was supposed to bring the American culture in the form of books, films and music, closer to the people of Frankfurt.

=== Messeturm, Festhalle and Hammering Man ===
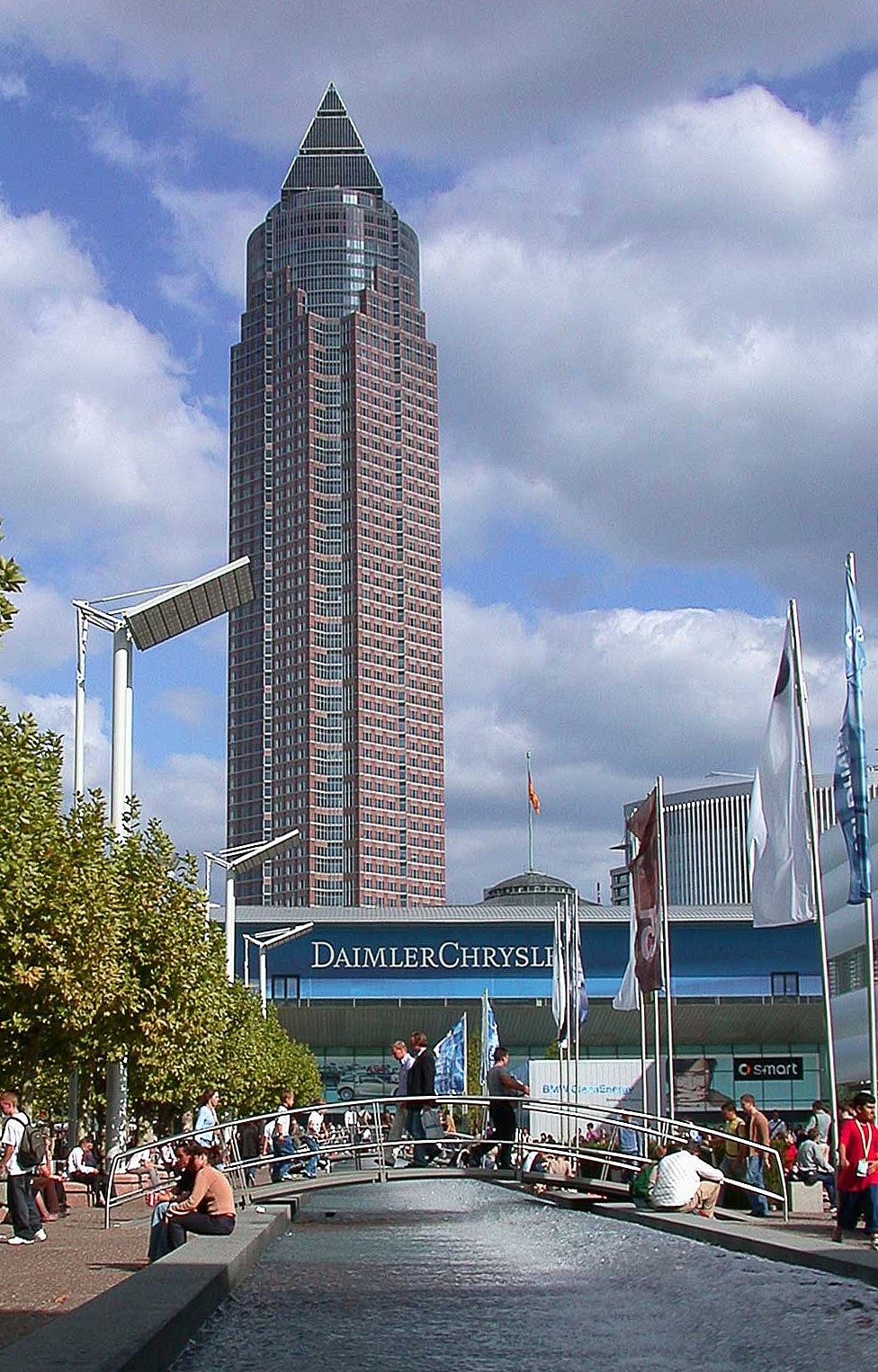
Messeturm

The Messeturm is the second tallest building in the European Union. It is located on the western end of Westend-Süd at the fairground. Alongside is the Festhalle, a civic center, with a freely supported dome construction of glass and steel between stone corner-towers. It belongs to the first building which were constructed on the fairground. Regular exhibitions and concerts take place here. On the forecourt of both buildings stands the Hammering Man, a moving statue by American artist Jonathan Borofsky.

=== Campus Westend of Goethe University at IG Farben Building and Grüneburgpark ===
The established corporate headquarters of IG Farben were erected at Grüneburgpark in Westend-Nord in 1928. After World War II the IG Farben Building became the main location of the American armed forces in Europe. Since 2001 it serves as the new campus for the Goethe University. The surrounding Grüneburgpark lies in the curve of Miquelallee and is one of the biggest parks in Frankfurt.

=== Horse stables ===
One of the few original, preserved buildings remaining is the former Livingstonsche Pferdestall in Ulmenstraße. It is the only building left of a magnificent mansion complex of Max Livingston.

=== Westend Synagogue ===
The Westend Synagogue, located in Freiherr-vom-Stein-Straße 30, is the largest synagogue in Frankfurt and one of three currently used synagogues in Frankfurt. Built originally during 1908 to 1910, it served the liberal community until its closing and partial demolition in 1938. However, on account of the buildings' close proximity to residential buildings, firemen sped to extinguish the fire sparked by non-Jewish German civilians and Sturmabteilung troops. After the war the synagogue was reinaugurated on 6 September 1950, this time by Orthodox Jews; it now houses the Yeshiva Gedolah Frankfurt. The synagogue's original design resembled Assyrian–Egyptian architecture. Throughout the various renovations that took place this orientation was preserved.

=== Suhrkamp Haus ===
The functional structure of the Suhrkamp publishing house is located in Lindenstraße, the architectural reputation of the residence corresponds inversely to its literary importance.
