= Westend Synagogue =

Synagogue in Frankfurt am Main, Germany

Coordinates: 50°07′16″N 8°39′52″E

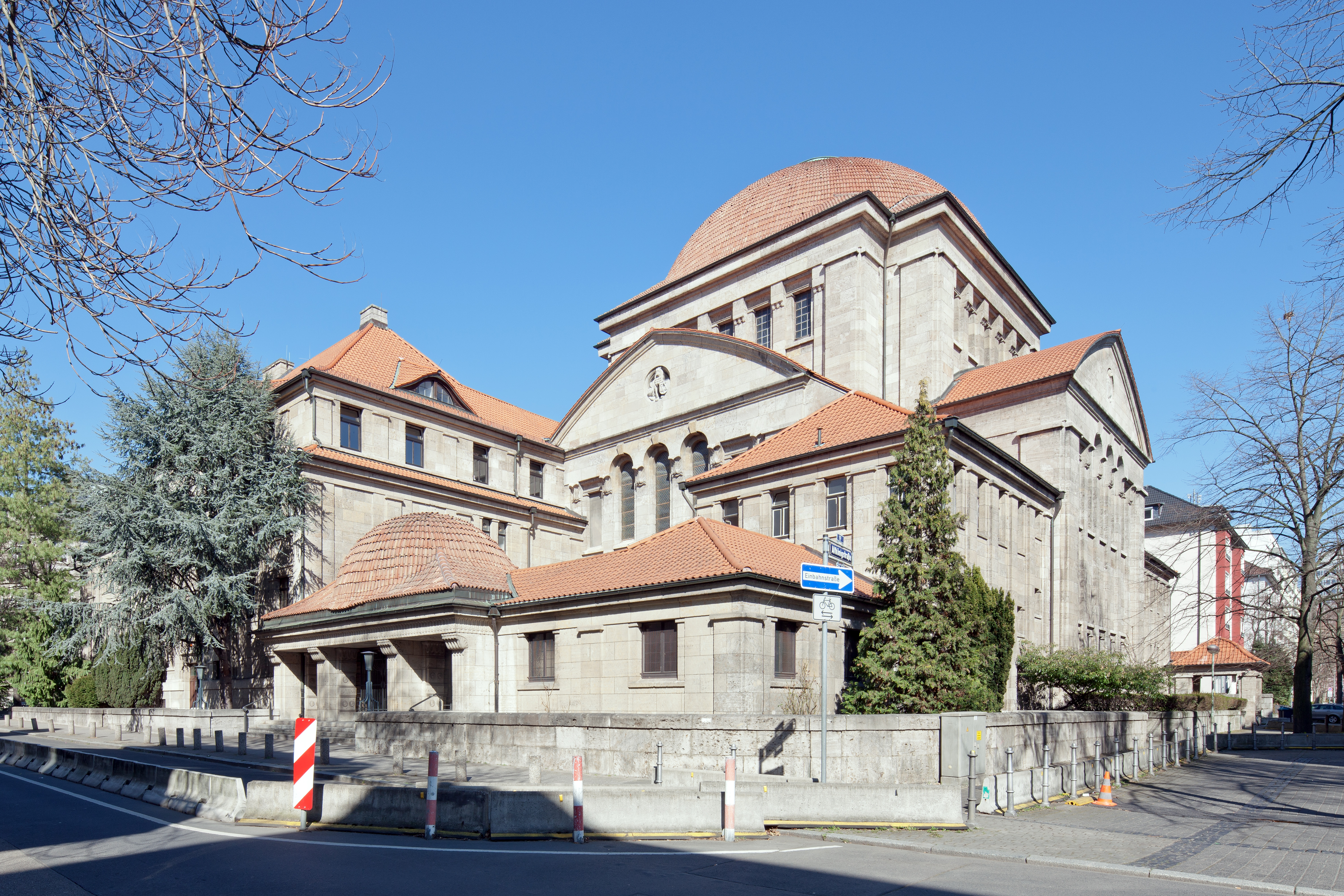
Westend Synagogue from southwest, 2012

The Westend Synagogue (Westend-Synagoge), built between 1908 and 1910, is the largest synagogue in Frankfurt am Main and serves as the spiritual center of the city's Jewish community. It is the only one of Frankfurt's four pre-war large synagogues to have survived the November pogroms of 1938 and the World War II bombings, although it suffered significant damage.

== History ==
The synagogue was designed by the architects Franz Roeckle and Siegfried Kusnitzky, incorporating elements of Neo-Romanesque and Art Nouveau styles. The building's exterior features intricate stonework and a large dome, which remains a prominent feature in Frankfurt's Westend district. When it was completed in 1910, it became a major center for Jewish life in the city, reflecting the prominence of Frankfurt's Jewish community in the early 20th century.

Originally, the synagogue was a place of worship for the liberal Reform wing of Judaism, serving a thriving Jewish population in Frankfurt before the rise of the Nazi regime. During the Nazi era, Jewish life in Frankfurt was nearly eradicated. The synagogue was vandalized during the November pogroms of 1938, but unlike other major synagogues in the city, it was not completely destroyed. The building suffered further damage during the bombings of World War II, particularly in the later stages of the war when Frankfurt faced heavy air raids.

== Postwar restoration ==
Following the end of World War II, efforts to restore the synagogue began as Jewish survivors and returning community members sought to rebuild their lives. In 1950, after a temporary renovation, the synagogue was re-consecrated, once again serving as a house of worship. However, the restoration work remained incomplete for several decades due to financial constraints and the small size of the post-war Jewish community in Frankfurt.

A comprehensive restoration effort took place between 1989 and 1994, during which the synagogue was returned to its original architectural splendor. This renovation was part of a broader effort to preserve Jewish heritage in Frankfurt and recognize the resilience of the city's Jewish community. Today, the Westend Synagogue remains an active place of worship and a historical landmark, hosting regular services, cultural events, and educational programs.

== Architecture ==
The Westend Synagogue is known for its blend of Neo-Romanesque and Art Nouveau architectural elements. The main hall features a richly decorated ceiling, ornate stained-glass windows, and intricate mosaics. The synagogue's dome is adorned with its patterns that reflect the grandeur of early 20th-century synagogue architecture in Germany.

The building's façade is characterized by arched windows and ornamental stone carvings, while the interior includes a central bimah and an elaborately designed ark housing the Torah scrolls. The combination of these elements makes the Westend Synagogue one of the most architecturally significant synagogues in Europe.

== Significance ==
Beyond its architectural and historical importance, the Westend Synagogue serves as a symbol of Jewish resilience in Germany. It is one of the few surviving synagogues from before the Holocaust and stands as a testament to the endurance of Jewish life in Frankfurt. The synagogue plays an important role in the contemporary Jewish community, serving as a place for worship, religious study, and communal gatherings.

In recent years, it has also been the site of interfaith events, Holocaust remembrance ceremonies, and educational initiatives aimed at fostering dialogue about Jewish history and culture in Germany.
