= Cathérine Hug =

Swiss art historian and curator

Cathérine Hug (born 1976) is a Swiss art historian and curator.

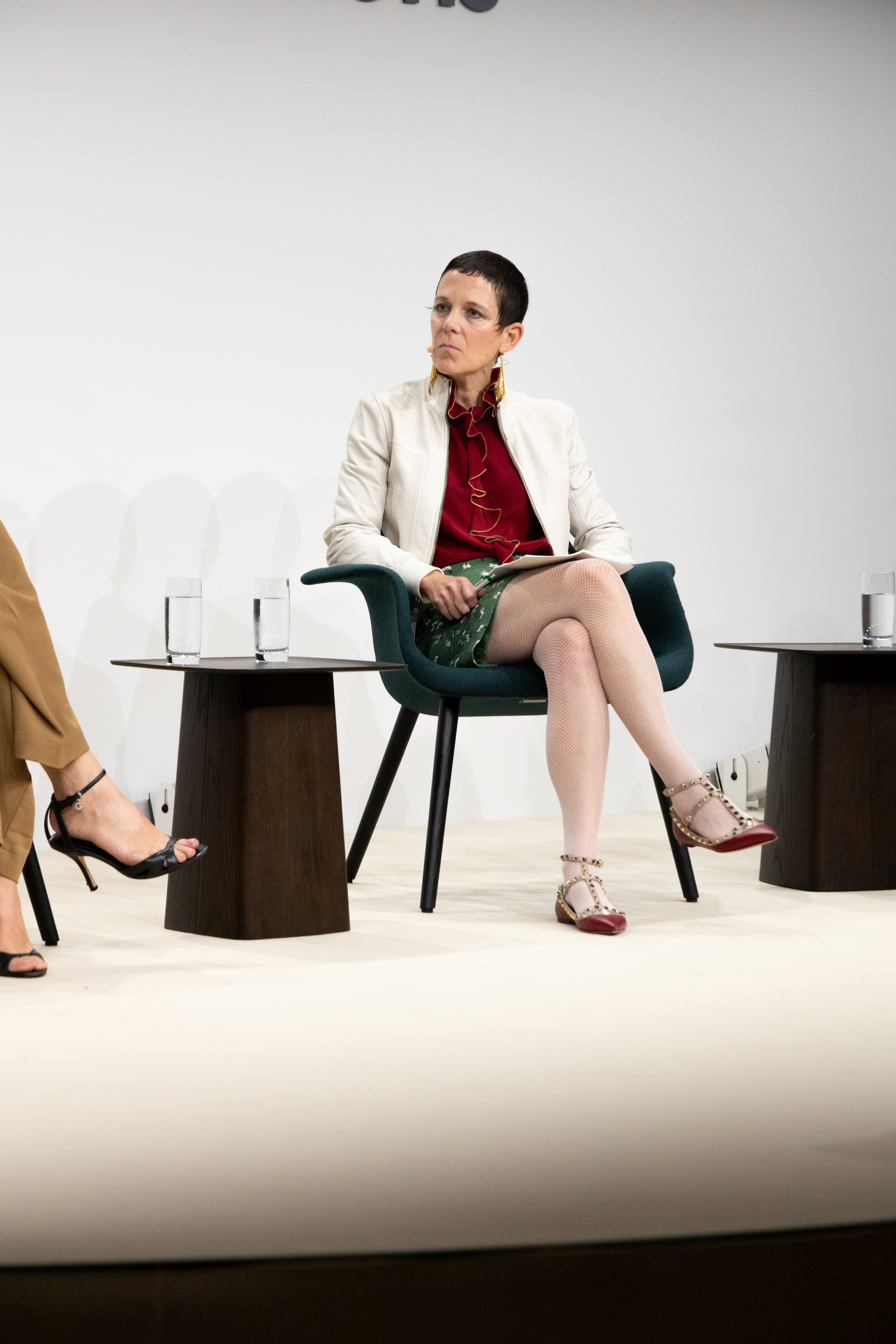

== Life and work ==
Hug was born in 1976 in Basel, Switzerland. With her parents and siblings she grew up in Saint-Ursanne and Delémont, Switzerland.

Hug studied Computer Science, Media Science and Art History at the Chairs of Rolf Pfeiffer, Heinz Bonfadelli and Stanislaus von Moos at the University of Zurich.

From 2000 until 2007 she was curatorial assistant at the Kunsthaus Zurich, where she worked closely with Bice Curiger and Tobia Bezzola.

From 2005 until 2008 she was assistant of the Art Unlimited Curator Simon Lamunière at the Art Basel. As freelance curator she organized among others Unloaded (Oberschan 2002–03) with Giovanni Carmine; In The Alps with Tobia Bezzola (Kunsthaus Zurich, 2006); and Carola Giedion-Welcker and Modernism (Kunsthaus Zurich, 2007).

From 2008 until 2013 she was curator at the Kunsthalle Wien in Vienna, where she curated among others Thomas Ruff (2009), 1989. End of History or Beginning of the Future? (2009–10) with Gerald Matt, Street And Studio. From Basquiat to Séripop (2010) with Thomas Mießgang, Space. About A Dream (2011) with Walter Famler, Lucy Skaer – Force Justify (2012), WWTBD – What Would Thomas Bernhard Do and Salon der Angst with Nicolaus Schafhausen (both 2013). From 2011 until 2013 she was in the works council and supervisory board (Betriebsrat and Aufsichtsrat) of Kunsthalle Wien.

Since 2013 she is curator at the Kunsthaus Zurich, where she curated among others Von Matisse zum Blauen Reiter (2014) with Timothy Benson (LACMA, Los Angeles); Europa. The Future of History (2015) with Robert Menasse; Tomi Ungerer. Incognito (2015) in collaboration with Folkwang Essen; Dadaglobe Reconstructed (2016) with Adrien Sudhalter in collaboration with MoMA New York; and Francis Picabia. A retrospective (2016) with Anne Umland in collaboration with MoMA New York.

As guest curator she curated Feiert das Leben! with Robert Menasse and Manuela Laubenberger at the Kunsthistorisches Museum Wien in Vienna (2015–16). Hug is further project leader of the digitalization of the Kunsthaus Dada Collection (2013–16).

== Exhibitions and projects ==
(*) labels exhibitions with an accompanying publication or catalogue

1999

- Co-conductor with Charlotte Tschumi of the tutorial course The Actuality of Walter Benjamin & the Critical Theory, Institute of Art History, University of Zurich (Winter term 1999/2000).

2000

- Editorial collaboration to the exhibition catalogue Mixing Memory and Desire, Museum of Art Lucerne.
- Assistant to the artists’ books publishing house Memory/Cage Editions, Zurich.
- Editorial assistance to the exhibition catalogue Hypermental*, curated by Bice Curiger and Christoph Heinrich at the Kunsthaus Zurich and Hamburger Kunsthalle.

2001

- Program with Giovanni Carmine of the Nam June Paik-retrospective at Videoex*, organiser Patrik Huber.
- Curatorial assistance to Daniel Kurjakovic's group exhibition A World Within A Space*, Kunsthalle Zurich 2001.

2002

- Co-curator with Giovanni Carmine of the exhibition UNLOADED – Coming Up For Air*, Oberschan. With the participation of Monica Bonvicini (D), Anne-Lise Coste (F), Christoph Büchel, Olivier Mosset and Gianni Motti among others.
- Reader/voice of Rirkrit Tiravanija's 280min video work (ghost reader C.H.), video animation.
- Assistant to Bice Curiger's group exhibition Public Affairs*, Kunsthaus Zurich.

2003

- University exams with the degree of lic. phil. (equivalent to M.A.) in Art History, Computer Science and Media Science, University of Zurich, Switzerland.

2004

- Scientific research associate and catalogue author of Monet: the Garden*, Kunsthaus from October 29, 2004 – March 13, 2005.

2005

- Co-curator with Alexandra Blättler of Friends Electric!* with the participating artists Jen Liu (New York) and Andrea Thal (Zurich) at Binz39, Zurich.
- Assistant Art Unlimited *, Art 36 Basel. Project Manager Ursula Diehr, Curator Simon Lamunière.
- Research collaborator at the Kunsthaus Zurich in relation with the exhibition catalogue Sigmar Polke: Werke & Tage* curated by Bice Curiger.

2006

- Assistant Art Unlimited*, Art 37 Basel. Curator Simon Lamunière.
- Co-curator with Tobia Bezzola of In the Alps* (Fall/Winter 2006), Kunsthaus Zurich.
- Swiss delegate of the Fine Arts Showcase in Liverpool organized by the British Council on the occasion of the Liverpool Biennial, 2006, in October 2006.

2007

- Ph.D. researches at the National Library of Canada, Ottawa (Nov. 06 – Jan. 07)
- AZPAA (A-Z public art projects) in collaboration with Annie Wu and Manuela Schlumpf, a non-profit art agency looking for unconventional exhibition locations and helping to produce site-specific artworks.
- Assistant Art Unlimited*, Art 38 Basel. Curator Simon Lamunière.
- Guest-curator of the exhibition Carola Giedion-Welcker und die Moderne, Kunsthaus Zurich, August 31 – November 18, 2007,
- Assistant to Simon Lamunière, Art Director of Utopics*, 11e Exposition Suisse de Sculpture, 11. Schweizerische Plastikausstellung, Bienne (Summer/Fall 09).

2008

- Assistant Art Unlimited*, Art 39 Basel. Curator Simon Lamunière.
- Co-curator together with Christoph Doswald of the exh. KONKRET MEGAMOPP. Sammlung Moderne Kunst – Neuerwerbungen*, with among others Katia Bassanini, Anton Bruhin, Stéphane Dafflon, Philippe Decrauzat, Martin Disler, Mark Divo, Germann/Lorenzi, Info Giezendanner, Hanspeter Hofmann, Zilla Leutenegger, Elodie Pong, and David Renggli, Foundation Stiftung Charles und Agnes Vögele, Pfäffikon/SZ, Sept. 21 – Nov. 2, 2008.

2009

- Co-curator with Gerald Matt of 1989. End of History or Beginning of the Future? Comments on a Paradigm Shift*, with among others Marina Abramovic, Chantal Akerman, Christoph Büchel and Giovanni Carmine, Erik Bulatov, Chen Danqing, Harun Farocki, Johan Grimonprez, Hans Haacke, Anna Jermolaewa, Ilya & Emilia Kabakov, Alexander Kosolapov, Barbara Kruger, Lars Laumann, Boris Mikhailov, Marcel Odenbach, Susan Philipsz, Neo Rauch, Nedko Solakov, Song Dong, Jane & Louise Wilson, KUNSTHALLE wien, October 9 – February 7, 2010,
- Curator of Thomas Ruff. Surfaces, Depth*, KUNSTHALLE wien, May 21 – September 13,

2010

- Co-curator with Rita Vitorelli of ZINE*FAIR, 1st international Fanzine & Small Publishers’ Fair in Austria, September 18.
- Co-curator with Thomas Mießgang of Street and Studio From Basquiat to Séripop*, with among others Rita Ackermann, Charlie Ahearn, Kader Attia, Jean-Michel Basquiat, Dara Birnbaum, Blek le Rat, Sophie Calle, Sol LeWitt, KUNSTHALLE wien, June 25 – Oct. 10, 2010,
- Co-curator with Gerald Matt of Marilyn Manson – David Lynch: Genealogies of Pain*, KUNSTHALLE wien, June 28 – July 11,
- Co-curator with Isabel Reiß and Dimitrina Sevova of the exh. ich tier! (du mensch) – du tier! (ich mensch) i animal! (you human) – you animal! (i human), with among others Christian Eisenberger, Klara Hobza, Lin May, Silke Nowak, a collab. between Perla-Mode, Dienstgebäude, Corner College, English Institute and History Institute of the University of Zurich (Bronfen), Zurich, April 9 – 25, 2010,

2011

- Co-curator with Rita Vitorelli of ZINE*FAIR, 2nd international Fanzine & Small Publishers’ Fair in Austria, KUNSTHALLE wien, September 17, 2011.
- Curator of Franz Huemer: Seher und Genie, Seer and Genius, KUNSTHALLE Wien project wall, Sept. 17 – March 1, 2012,
- Co-curator with Karolina Dankow of the BA diploma class of Erik Steinbrecher, Zurich School of Arts (abbr. ZHdK), April–June 2011.
- Curator of Loris Gréaud*, KUNSTHALLE Wien project space, April 15 – May 25, 2011,
- Curator of WELTRAUM, die Kunst und ein Traum. SPACE. Art and a Dream*, KUNSTHALLE wien, March 31 – August 15, 2011, with among others Paweł Althamer, Vladimir Dubossarsky & Alexander Vinogradov, William Kentridge, Jen Liu, Mariko Mori, Deimantas Narkevičius, Amalia Pica, Robert Rauschenberg, Pipilotti Rist, Thomas Ruff, Wilhelm Sasnal, Keith Tyson, Jane & Louise Wilson, Carey Young,

2012

- Zine*Fair, 3rd international Fanzine & Small Publishers’ Fair in Austria co-curated by Rita Vitorelli (Spike Art Quarterly), KUNSTHALLE wien, September 22–23, 2012.
- 20th Parabolic Flight Campaign, special project "Kunst schwebt" on invitation of Deutsches Zentrum für Luft- und Raumfahrt e.V. (DLR) (Initiator Peter Zarth, DLR Cologne) to make participate the three artists Julieta Aranda, Thomas Ruff as well as the writer Clemens Berger to the campaign, Novespace in Merignac-Bordeaux and ILA in Berlin, September 13–16, 2012.
- Curator of Lucy Skaer – Force Justify (part 3), KUNSTHALLE wien, project space Karlsplatz, July 4 until August 26, 2012,
- Talks series Kleinodien – Anomalous Talks, people talking about their extraordinary but rather unknown or invisible activity, job or passion, organized together with visual artist Andreas Duscha and writer Clemens Berger, Salzburg and Vienna, launched on Nov. 14, 2011.
- Unheimliche Reise, Uncanny Journey, exhibition and screenings with Annette Amberg, Kader Attia, Ursula Biemann, Neil Beloufa, Luis Buñuel, Djibril Diop Mambety, Harun Farocki, Robert Jelinek, Katia Kameli, Bouchra Khalili, Philip Mayrhofer & Christian Kobald, Uriel Orlow, Jean Rouch, Clemens von Wedemeyer, initiated by and co-curated with Nadja Baldini & Beat Huber, Dienstgebaeude, Zurich, March 23 – April 22, 2012,
- Curator of Daniel Knorr, Explosion, KUNSTHALLE Wien project space karlsplatz, sculpture place, March 29, 2012 – February 28, 2013,
- Curator of Ulrike Lienbacher, Kartenhaus, KUNSTHALLE Wien project space karlsplatz, sculpture place, March 29, 2012 – February 28, 2013,

2013

- Co-Curator with Nicolaus Schafhausen of Salon der Angst*, thematic group exhibition reflecting on the phenomena of fears through the past three decades, September 13, 2013 – January 2014,
- Editor in charge and author of the cat. accompanying the competition to the permanent installation Vienna Art Passage Karlsplatz, with the participation of the 9 artists Lee Bul, Ernst Caramelle (competition winner), Barbara Kruger, Sarah Morris, Jorge Pardo, Gerwald Rockenschaub, Markus Schinwald, Cerith Wyn Evans and Sam Taylor-Wood, organized by KÖR and funded by Wiener Linien, Kunsthalle Wien project Space, June 2013,
- Zine*Fair, 4th international Fanzine & Small Publishers’ Fair in Austria co-curated by Rita Vitorelli (Spike Art Quarterly), Kunsthalle Wien, 28–30 June,
- Co-Curator with Nicolaus Schafhausen and Lucas Gehrmann of WWTBD – What Would Thomas Bernhard Do, a rather rhetorical more than literal question, alluding to a tradition of critical thinking in Vienna. The event is meant to stand in the realm of this way of critical thinking and acting, but against an international, interdisciplinary and process-oriented background, Festival taking place from May 16 until May 26, 2013,

2014

- Co-curator with Timothy Benson of the exhibition Von Matisse zum Blauen Reiter. Expressionismus in Deutschland und Frankreich*, an exhibition touring from Kunsthaus Zurich to Los Angeles County Museum and the Musée des Beaux-Arts de Montréal. Accompanied by a large event programme,

2015

- Curator of Tomi Ungerer. Incognito*, Kunsthaus Zurich from October 30 – February 7, Folkwang Museum Essen from March 18 – May 16, 2016,
- Co-curator with Manuela Laubenberger and Robert Menasse of Feiert das Leben! Zehn Lebensmasken werden zu Kunst*, an exhibition in collaboration with Caritas at Kunsthistorisches Museum Wien September 29 – April 3, 2016, accompanied by a large event programme,
- Curator of Sinnliche Ungewissheit. Eine Privatsammlung, Kunsthaus Zurich from June 19 – October 4,
- Co-curator with Robert Menasse of Europa. Die Zukunft der Geschichte*, Kunsthaus Zürich June 12 – September 6, accompanied by a large event programme,

2016

- Co-curator with Anne Umland of Francis Picabia. A Retrospective*, Kunsthaus Zurich June 3 – September 25, at MoMA New York from November 20, 2016 – March 19, 2017, accompanied by a large event programme
- Co-curator with Adrian Sudhalter of Dadaglobe Reconstructed*, Kunsthaus Zurich February 5 – May 1, at MoMA New York from June 12 – September 18,
- Project leader of the digitalization of the Kunsthaus Dada Collection (2013–2016),

2017

- Art in Case, conversation at the Tel Aviv Art Museum with Tim Voss, Rene Morales and Roslyn Bernstein with an introduction by Chen Tamir
- Panelist at Transeuropa 2017, transnational artistic, cultural and political festival organised by European Alternatives since 2007

2018

- Co-curator with Christoph Becker of Fashion. Extreme Clothes in the Arts* (Kunsthaus Zürich, April 4 – July 17, 2018). As stated in the official press release, the curators “have secured the loan of some truly eye-catching exhibits, including a set of Austrian folded skirt armour from around 1526 that has never before been seen in Switzerland. Works by the English School are also leaving their homeland for the first time”. Art critic Katharina Rudolph wrote about this exhibition in the German newspaper FAZ that this explorative show takes the system of Fashion and its implication serious by having a look at its extremes.
- Curator of the retrospective Oskar Kokoschka: Expressionist, Migrant, European* (Kunsthaus Zürich, December 14, 2018 – March 10, 2019). It was the first retrospective of his work in Switzerland for 30 years. The highlights among the more than 200 exhibits included the monumental Prometheus Triptych (1950, The Courtauld Art Gallery, London) and the Mural for Alma Mahler (1914, Private Collection on loan at Museum Leopold Vienna), which have since their creation been exhibited outside their respective countries UK and Austria only once. The exhibition was widely celebrated as “brilliant” by the press, and toured to the Museum Leopold in Vienna (April 6 – July 8, 2019) afterwards where it was co-curated by Heike Eipeldauer. In the Wall Street Journal from January 2, 2019, art critic Adam J. Goldmann says about the retrospective that “the show, elegantly curated by Cathérine Hug, takes us through eight decades of art in as many chronological and thematic chapters (…) the effect of having journeyed so far through time is staggering. Nearly four decades after Kokoschka’s death, the Kunsthaus Zurich has given us new hope that his singular artistic universe will endure.”

2019

- Curator of Fly me to the Moon. 50 years on* (April 5 – June 30, 2019). This exhibition supported by the German Space Agency DLR had loans from over 60 international lenders such as the ETHZ who also featured the show in its own news channel Explora. In her article for the international newspaper NZZ, art historian Angelika Affentranger-Kirchrath, who praises the explorative and humorous approach of the show, reminds us that the most important insight about the Moon landing was the Earth's encounter with itself. This show travelled to the Museum of Modern Art in Salzburg after Zurich (July 20 – November 3, 2019), where it was co-curated by Christina Penetsdorfer, Thorsten Sadowsky and Tina Teufel. The daily newspaper Kurier appreciates the self-critical tone of the exhibition. The pan-European cultural and humanities magazine Versopolis published an excerpt of Cathérine Hug's curatorial catalogue essay.

2020

- Curator of Smoke and Mirrors. The Roaring Twenties* (03.07.-11.10.2020). Styles emerged in architecture and design that are as fresh today, in the 21st century, as they were a hundred years ago. Having a closer look at Berlin, Paris, Vienna and Zurich, the exhibition covers all the prevalent media of the 1920s, from painting, sculpture and drawing to photography, film and collage, fashion and design. This exhibition with some 300 art works from 80 artists such as Josef Albers, Kader Attia, Johannes Baargeld, Josephine Baker, Marc Bauer, Coco Chanel, Hans Finsler, Laura J Gerlach and Margarete Schütte-Lihotszky, Valeska Gert, Hannah Höch, Rashid Johnson, Wassily Kandinsky, Elisabeth Karlinsky, Paul Klee, Rudolf von Laban and Suzanne Perrottet, Le Corbusier, Fernand Léger, Jeanne Mammen, László Moholy-Nagy, Alexandra Navratil, Trevor Paglen, Gret Palucca, Charlotte Perriand, Hans Richter, Thomas Ruff, Christian Schad, Xanti Schawinsky, Shirana Shahbazi, Veronika Spierenburg, Rita Vitorelli is also shown in the Guggenheim Museum in Bilbao (07.05.-19.9.2021), where it is co-curated by Petra Joos. In Summer and Fall took place events with among others spoken beats legend Jurczok 1001 on Bert Brecht and Marieluise Fleisser (8.10.20) as well as Ana Dordevic, Lindiwe Mlaba and Valentine Michaud with her new production Josephine Baker meets Beyoncé (26.9.20) for the guerillaclassics.

2021

- Co-curator with Hubertus Butin and Lisa Ortner-Kreil of Gerhard Richter. Landscape* (26.3.-25.7.2021) in association with the Bank Austria Kunstforum Wien. The exhibition includes some 130 works, large scale paintings, drawings and photographs as well as prints. The catalogue includes contributions by the Norwegian artist Mathias Faldakken and the American Scholar TJ Demos.
- Co-curator with Sandra Gianfreda of the exhibitions Earth Beats. The changing face of nature (4.10.20-6.2.21)
- Hug is co-curator with Mirjam Varadinis of the Digilab at Kunsthaus Zurich, launched in October 2021

2022

- Curator of Take Care: Art and Medicine (8 April to 17 July 2022). Nicola Graef featured the exhibition also in her seminal documentary Kunst und Krankheit: Kranke Körper, verletzte Seelen (2022, SWR/arte) and interviewed Cathérine Hug and the participating artist Veronika Spierenburg on this occasion. The media coverage was widespread in other disciplines due to the explorative character of the show, as f.e. the interview with the physician Nicolò Saverio Centemero in the medical journal Rivista shows.
- Co-curator of Federico Fellini: From Sketch to Drawing (1 July to 4 September 2022). A catalogue with texts by co-curator Tobias Burg, an interview discussion between Burg, Hug and Fellini Assistant Gérald Morin, as well as a new essay by Nora Gomringer has been published by Steidl (Göttingen). The exhibition was featured prime-time by the national broadcast format 10 vor 10 on July 4, 2022.

2023

- Curator of Time: From Dürer to Bonvicini (22.9.2023-14.1.2024). This exhibition, which was created in collaboration with the Musée international d’horlogerie (MIH) in La Chaux-de-Fonds, shows how artists’ engagement with the concept of time is limitless in its variety. In the course of three years of research, some 250 exhibits (including 60 clocks) from six centuries and by 100 artists and clockmakers have been selected and are divided into six thematic chapters, which contribute exemplarily to the exciting narrative of time perception and its measurement, such as “deep” and “own” time. It is one of the first such comprehensive exhibitions worldwide to place cross-epochal as well as transdisciplinary art and timekeepers in a direct, equal dialogue. A comprehensive catalogue of 320 pages with contributions among others by Helga Nowotny, Rüdiger Safransky and Josef Teichman has been published. The German-French channel ARTE produced the full 30 minutes documentary “Die Zeit in der Kunst” (Time in the Arts) taking the exhibition as departure point and featuring especially Maya Minder, Monica Ursina Jäger and Sinzo Aanza with studio visits. Coinciding with the exhibition, the most prestigious international watch makers’ prize GPHG made a show with the awarded watches 2024 at the Kunsthaus.

2024

- Co-curator with Sandra Gianfreda of Apropos Hodler: Current Perspectives on an Icon (8.3.-30.6.2024). A comprehensive catalogue has been published with Hodler experts such as Monika Brunner, Matthias Frehner, Diana Blome and Niklaus Güdel as well world-known literature authors such as Kim de l’Horizon, Siri Hustvedt and Mariam Kühsel-Hussaini. The national broadcast SRF produced a 30 minutes documentary on painters’ careers where this exhibition is also discussed closely especially with Nicolas Party’s contribution in situ at the museum.
- Co-curator with Lisa Ortner-Kreil of the retrospective Kiki Kogelnik (22.3.-14.7.2024) in cooperation with the Kiki Kogelnik Foundation, Kunstforum Wien and Kunstmuseum Brandts. A comprehensive catalogue has been published with special contributions by Sylvie Fleury and Mai-Thu Perret.
- Co-editor with Bernhard Stadelmann of Art Textile Kunst, an anthology on textile-related art with the contributions of Sinzo Anza, Magdalena Abakanowicz, Ghada Amer, Jonathan Baldock, Heidi Bucher, Martin Soto Climént, Tobias Kaspar, Jakup Ferri, Serge Mouangue, Ernesto Neto, Reto Pulfer, Mrinalini Mukherjee, Talaya Schmid, Yinka Shonibare, Małgorzata Mirga-Tas, Jeanne Vicérial, Nives Widauer, Andrea Zittel.

2025

- Co-curator of retrospectives co-curated by Talia Kwartler on Suzanne Duchamp (in cooperation with Kunsthalle Schirn in Frankfurt/M. and Lygia Clark co-curated by Irina Grun and Maike Steinkamp (in cooperation with Neue Nationalgalerie in Berlin) announced in the 2025 annual program of Kunsthaus Zurich.
