= One world foundation =

one world foundation (owf)
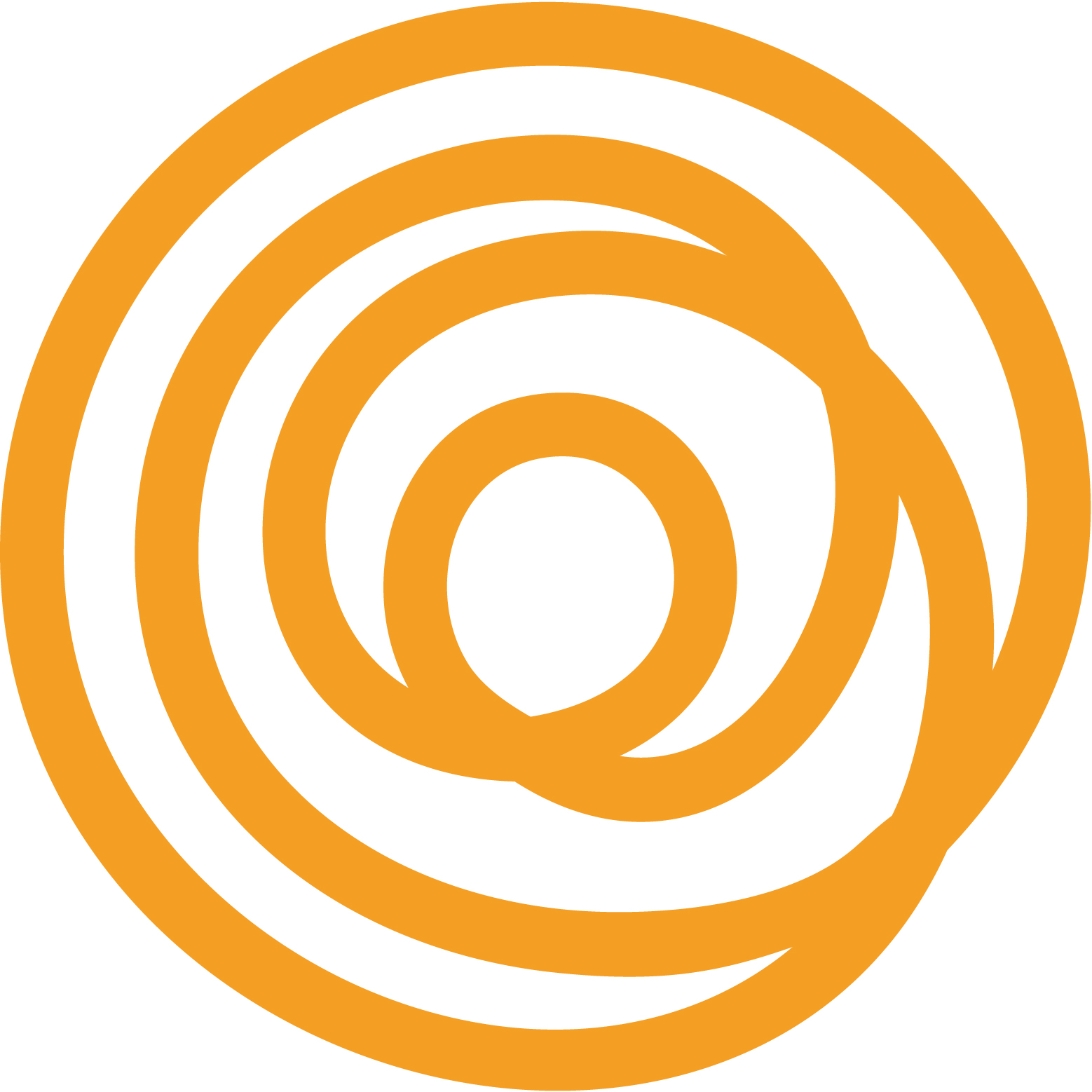
- Foundation logo created by Walter Obholzer
- Founded: 1995
- Founder: Kathrin Messner / Josef Ortner († 2009)
- Type: Aid organisation
- Location: Vienna, Austria
- Website: owf.at

one world foundation is a non-profit aid organisation in Sri Lanka, which operates a school for more than 1,100 children, adolescents and adults. The project is financed with the proceeds from a guest house and from donations. The foundation is a social enterprise which aims to contribute to Sri Lankan society via its educational provision and as an employer providing social benefits and fair working conditions for its employees. The private social project was founded in 1995 by Kathrin Messner and Josef Ortner. The foundation also operates a residence programme for artists and writers.

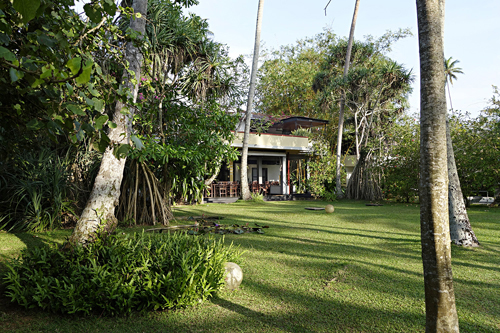
one world foundation, Ayurveda Resort Bogenvillya, Photo: Heli Hinkel

== The Free Education Unit ==
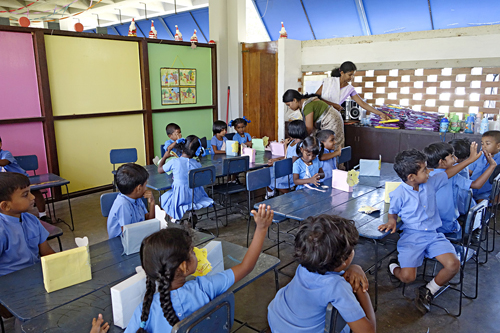
one world foundation, Free Education Unit, Photo: Heli Hinkel

The educational project "Free Education Unit" is a private school in Ahungalla (with a pre-school in Katuwile) for more than 1,100 children, adolescents and adults which offers free education in addition to state schooling as well as free vocational training programmes. It was founded in 1995 with approximately 100 students, and in 2004 schooling and training was extended to 700 students. When the 2004 Indian Ocean earthquake and tsunami hit on 26 December 2004, the one world foundation facilities were completely destroyed. On the rebuilt school campus approximately 40 teachers are employed. Initially the focus was on English courses and programmes for pre-schoolers and women. Now, under the direction of former student Prabath Wijesekara, the school's curriculum includes music, sports, photography, computer and IT courses, and since 2010 also Tamil language courses. In the Women's Cooperation, mothers of the pre-schoolers receive basic training in a handicrafts and economic skills. The foundation trains women and men on an equal basis.

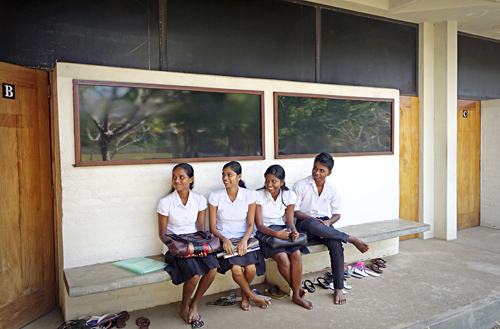
one world foundation, Free Education Unit, Photo: Heli Hinkel

Education and training are currently offered up to Level 4 of the National Vocational Qualification (NVQ). NVQ is the certification system of the Sri Lankan National Apprentice and Industrial Training Authority. At the same time the unit also meets the standards of the TVEC, the Tertiary and Vocational Education Commission. Both authorities are controlled by the Sri-Lankan Ministry of Education. Level 4 is the level of training for "Manual workers who can carry out their work alone". The Free Education unit's next aim is to obtain certification for Level 5 – the "Diploma Level for Future Supervisors".

== The Ayurveda Resort "Bogenvillya" ==
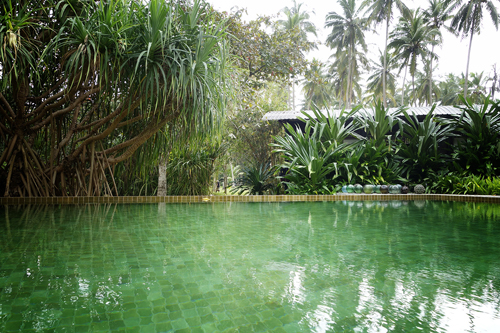
one world foundation, Ayurveda Resort Bogenvillya, Photo: Heli Hinkel

The one world foundation aims to promote a form of tourism based on mutual understanding and a fair exchange. The educational programmes of the Free Education Unit are funded from the proceeds from the guesthouse. In 2015 the Ayurveda Resort employed a staff of 35.

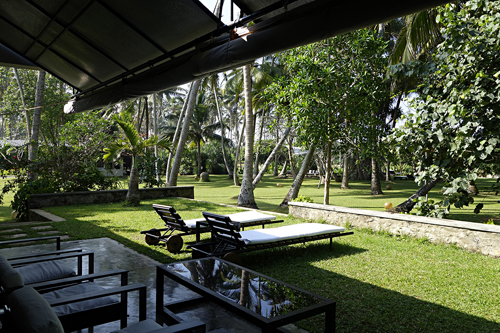
one world foundation, Ayurveda Resort Bogenvillya, Photo: Heli Hinkel

The Ayurveda Guesthouse Bogenvillya lies 80 km to the south of Colombo on the West coast of Sri Lanka, in the fishing village Ahungalla. The resort has direct access to the beach and is equipped with a swimming pool. The guest rooms are in the main building and the adjacent bungalows. Ayurvedic medical treatments are available, along with therapies such as massages and oil treatments as well as detoxification (Panchakarma). The course of a treatment is accompanied by consultations with the skilled in-house physicians. The guest house also offers yoga courses with qualified teachers every morning on a platform in the garden.

== Architecture ==
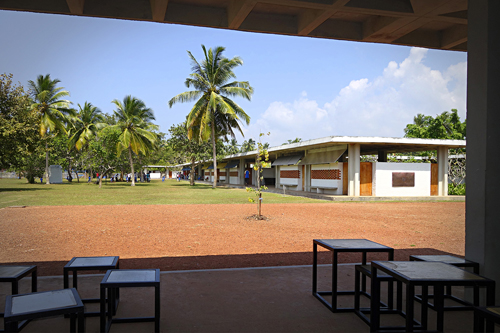
one world foundation, Free Education Unit, Architecture by Carl Pruscha, Photo: Heli Hinkel

The school building of one world foundation was designed by the Austrian architect Carl Pruscha, who also designed the "Palm Grove Bungalow" and the "Lagoon Bungalow" for the Ayurveda Resort. The main building of the guesthouse and the "Garden Loft" were built by Josef Ortner. The "Araliya Bungalow", added in 2015 and designed by Varuna de Silva, was the first bungalow planned by a Sri Lankan architect. Their open construction is designed to provide protection from intense sun light and monsoon downpours and provides ventilation without air conditioning.

== Residence programme for artists and writers ==
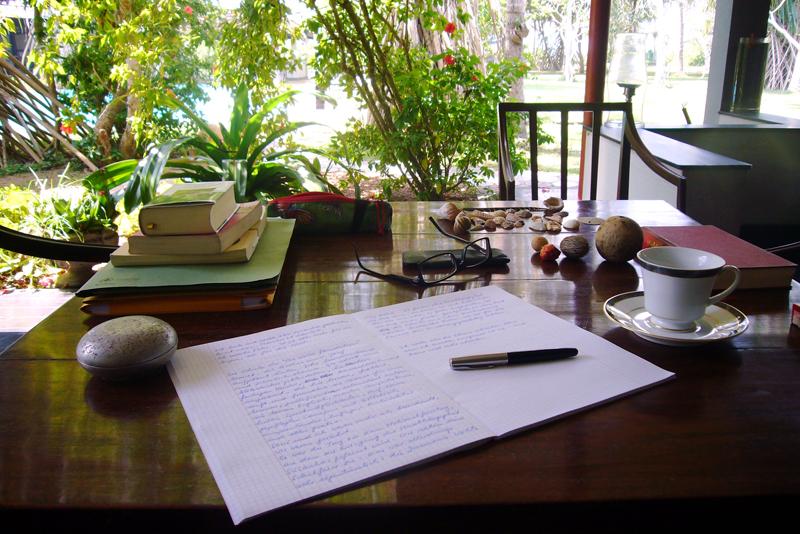
one world foundation, Writer in residence, Photo: Robert Menasse

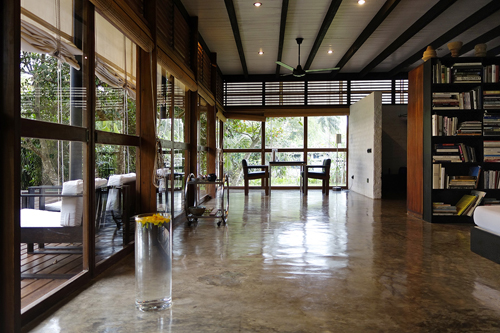
one world foundation, Ayurveda Resort Bogenvillya, Palm Grove Bungalow, Architecture by Carl Pruscha, Photo: Heli Hinkel

In 2009 Galerie Krinzinger in cooperation with one world foundation started an artist in residence programme. In Wathuregama – where until the tsunami in 2004 the old school grounds used to be – a studio was re-built and formally inaugurated on 14 January 2010. It is now available to the artists invited by the gallery. Some of the works of art created during the residencies are now on exhibition on the grounds of the resort and in the guest rooms.

So far the following artists completed a residence programme at one world foundation: Clarina Bezzola (2010), Christian Eisenberger (2013), Marcus Geiger (2010), Markus Hanakam (2014), Thomas Helbig (2009), Suhasini Kejriwal (2010), Ursula Mayer (2014), Peter Sandbichler (2015), Hans Schabus (2011/2012), Roswitha Schuller (2014), Ruchi Bakshi Sharma (2017), Sudarshan Shetty (2009), Navin Thomas (2009), Theegulla Venkanna (2013), Karunasiri Wijesinghe (2013).

The writer in residence programme is supported by the Austrian Ministry of Education, Arts and Culture. The curator of the programme is the Austrian writer Robert Menasse. The three months residencies are open to writers who work on transnational or transcultural projects. The writers taking part so far were: Rosa Artmann (2016), Dimitré Dinev (2011), Maja Haderlap (2012), Andreas Jungwirth (2017), Kala Ramesh (2014), David Schalko (2015), Sabine Scholl (2016), Cordula Simon (2014), Brita Steinwendtner (2013), Ilija Trojanow (2014), Andreas Weber (2014).

== Bibliography ==
- one world foundation. A Social Sculpture, Vienna 2015, ISBN 978-3-200-04240-7
