= Elfriede Czurda =

Austrian translator

- Born: 25 April 1946 (age 80); Wels
- Education: Universities in Saltzburg and Paris
- Occupation: writer

Elfriede Czurda (born 25 April 1946) is an Austria poet, writer and translator.

== Life ==
Czurda was born in Wels in 1946. She studied archaeology and Art History at the University of Saltzburg. She completed her education at the University Paris in 1973 with a doctorate and began writing the following year. By 1976 she was a full-time freelance writer. Her first book ein griff was published in 1978.

She lived in Berlin and Vienna.

The first two novels of her trilogy which she began in 1991 have attracted academic interest as they together with work by fellow Austrian Lilian Faschinger are said to show an interest in violence created by women. Her opening novel of the trilogy, Die Giftmörderinnen, is told in stylisised speech by the central figure who is in jail having poisoned her husband assisted by her lover and neighbour, Erika. She believes her husband sweet-talked her into marriage where she shared a home and her husband (incestuously) with his mother. The book uses the language that the main characters use but it also extends language developing new words. Czurda follows the Wiener Gruppe tradition. At the end of the novel the central figure, Else, is alone and suicidal.

In 2013 a translation of her first two books, Almost 1 Book, Almost 1 Life, was created by Rosmarie Waldrop. It was one of the six finalists for best translated book. Czurda's original text had featured poetry, unusual typographics and invented words. Waldrop's translation required her to create new words like stitchomantic to match Czurda's text. This was the first of Czurda's books to be translated into English.

== Awards include ==
In 1982 she was one of the winners of the Austrian Theodor Körner Prize given for cultural and scientific progress.

She won the Alexander Sacher Masoch Prize in 1997 which was worth 7,000 euros for young writers.

== Works include ==
- Die Giftmörderinnen, 1991
- Almost 1 Book, Almost 1 Life, translated in 2013
- Diotima, Or the Difference of the Happiness Gap and Nausicaa's Lucid Dream, 2018
