= Margot Pilz =

Austrian visual artist (born 1936)

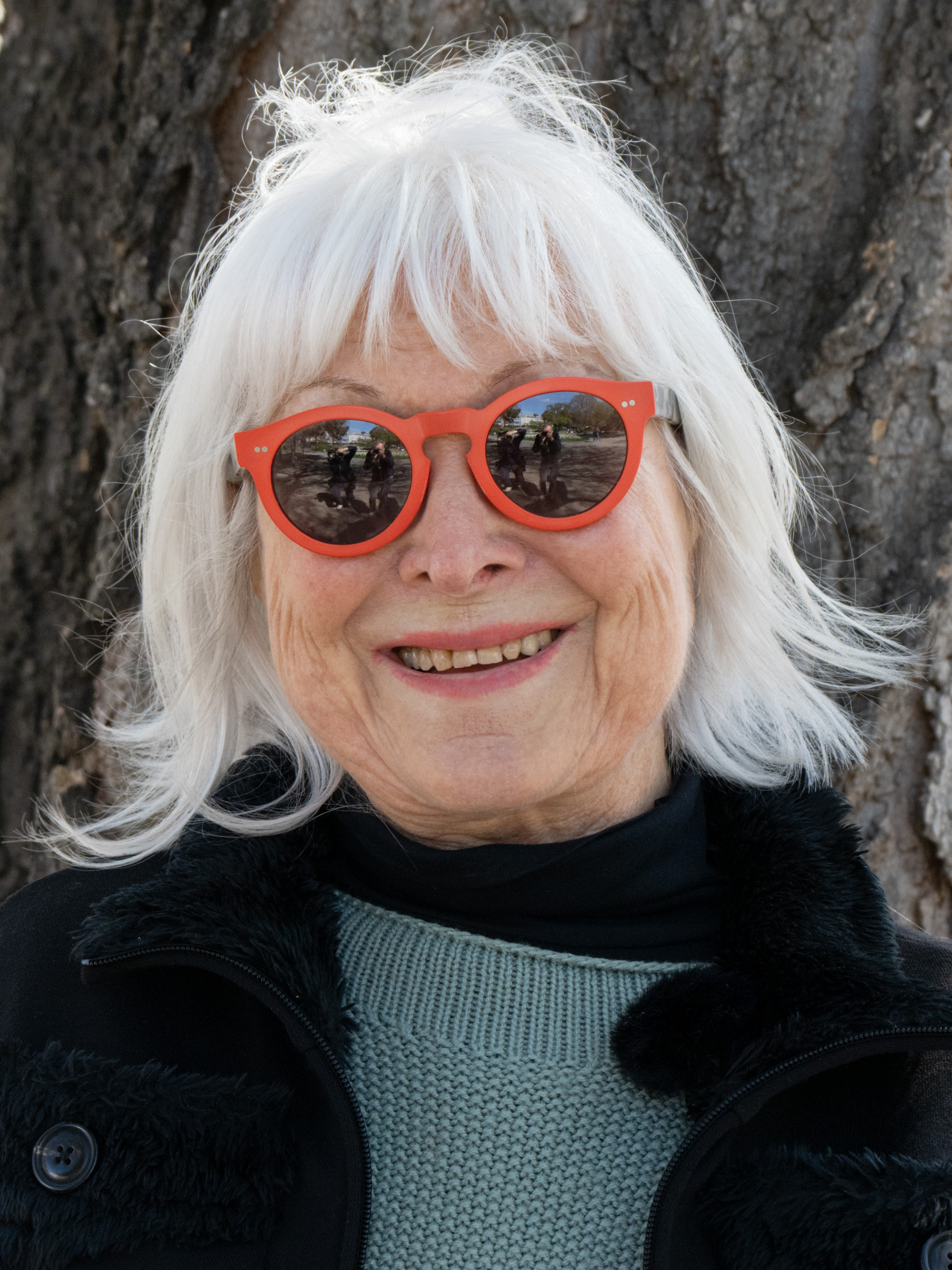
- Born: 1936 (age 89–90); Haarlem, Netherlands
- Awards: Theodor Körner Prize (1990)
- Website: http://www.margotpilz.at/

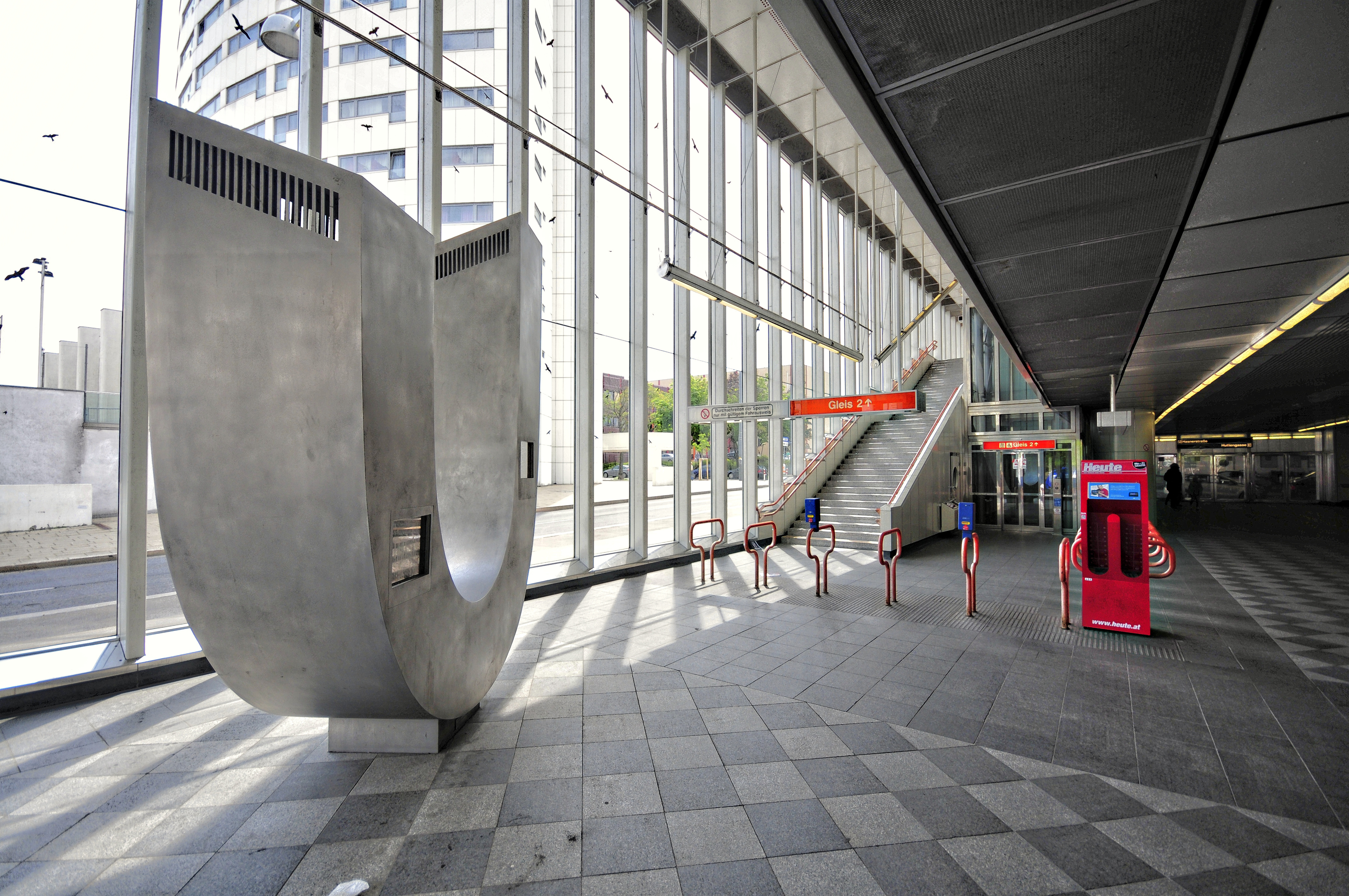
U-Turn, Margot Pilz, Vienna

External videos
- “HERSTORY – 36.000 YEARS OF GODDESSES & IDOLS ”, Margot Pilz, 2012
- “Celebration“, Margot Pilz, 2011–2012

Margot Pilz (born 1936, Haarlem, Netherlands) is an Austrian visual artist and a pioneer of conceptual and digital art in Austria. She was one of the first Austrian artists to combine computers and photography. Her works reflect the avant-garde culture of the 1960s and 1970s in their experimental techniques and performative aspects. Her work received renewed attention in the 2010s.

Pilz's photographs have been described as "one-second sculptures" or "flash-sculptures". She often chooses feminist approaches, addressing taboos, stereotyping, and environmental concerns. In this regard, her work has been compared to that of Valie Export. Much of her work is autobiographical. She has received a number of awards, including the Theodor Körner Prize (1990).

== Biography ==
Pilz was born in 1936 in Haarlem in the Netherlands. In 1939, when she was three years old, her family fled from the National Socialists to Semarang in Central Java, Indonesia. When the Japanese invaded Indonesia in March 1942, Pilz's father was sent to a concentration camp in Sumatra. She and her mother spent two years among 8,000 prisoners in Lampersari concentration camp, Semarang, Central Java. In Pilz's case, seven women and two children lived in a tiny filthy room. They suffered from typhus and one of Pilz's legs became infected and as a result is shorter than the other.

In 1954 Pilz went to Vienna to study photography at the Höheren Graphischen Bundeslehr- und Versuchsanstalt, the Federal Training and Research Institute of Graphic Arts. She worked with Hans Weiss as a commercial photographer in Vienna from 1971 to 1978. In 1976, she received her Meisterprüfung (master's certification) in photography.

Pilz was strongly affected by her arrest by plainclothes police officers at the Third Women's Festival in Vienna on 14 April 1978. She addressed these events through the creation of a body-centered series of self-portraits, communicating emotion to the audience both through expressive gestures and through the state of the linen jacket that she wore at the time of the arrest. These photographs, in which she is portrayed with crumpled clothes and in crouched postures, have been described as "one-second sculptures" or "flash-sculptures".

In 1978 Pilz also joined the feminist artists network Internationalen Aktionsgemeinschaft bildender Künstlerinnen (International Action Community of Fine Artists, IntAkt). Her work is closely related to the feminist movement of the 1970s and 1980s. In her work she explored and reflected on the institution of marriage, working conditions of women, and the social role of women. For example, for the work "Arbeiterinnenaltar" (Workers altar, 1981), she photographed workers at the coffee roastery Eduscho and questioned working conditions. Her photo sequence, The White Cell Project (1983–1985), placed her subjects within a small cardboard room, 165 centimeters wide, that concretized the weight and constraint of societal expectations and norms. She invited other artists to create works within the White Cell, including Renate Kordon, Linda Christanell, and Liesbeth Waechter-Böhm.

Pilz was a pioneer in media art in Austria. A well-known early work by Pilz was her intervention in a public space Kaorle am Karlsplatz (1982), for which she poured sand on the Karlsplatz in Vienna during the Wiener Festwochen (Vienna Festival) and had sun loungers set up. In 1991 Pilz created Delphi Digital, together with Roland Alton-Scheidl, for the Ars Electronica in Linz. The interactive digital installation engaged visitors in questioning environmental policy and democracy. An updated version using smartphones was exhibited in 2015–2016.

From 1990 to 1992 Pilz worked as a lecturer at the Technischen Universität Wien (Vienna University of Technology). In 1991 she was a visiting professor at Pandios Universität Athen, and from 1993 to 1994 she worked at Technischen Universität Graz.

Pilz has donated many of her early works to the city of Vienna, including 2,000 prints and 10,000 negatives from the 1970s to the 1990s. A retrospective of her work, Meilensteine (Milestone) was shown in Vienna in 2015, and her work is part of internationally shown exhibits on The Feminist Avant-Garde of the 1970s (2016–2018).

In 2018, Margot Pilz was one of five women featured in Sie ist der andere Blick (She is the other gaze), a documentary film created by Christiana Perschon and artist Iris Dostal. The film focuses on feminist artists of the 1970s who were part of the Viennese art scene. The film examines the ways in which their artistic practice and their feminism interact, as they recall challenges and obstacles that they faced and how they overcame them in both personal and political spaces. The other women filmed are Renate Bertlmann, Linda Christanell, Lore Heuermann, and Karin Mack. The film won a 2018 Theodor Körner Prize.

== Exhibitions ==
- 1981: Erweiterte Fotografie, Secession, Vienna
- 1984: Orwell und die Gegenwart, Belvedere 21/Museum des 20. Jahrhunderts, Vienna
- 1984: 4th Dimension, Dryphoto, Prado, Florence
- 1985: Identitätsbilder, Secession, Vienna
- 1985: Meditation 85, Steirischer Herbst, Graz, Austria
- 1985: The White Cell Project, Fotogalerie Wien, Vienna
- 1987: Le temps d'un movement, Musée d'Art Moderne de la Ville de Paris, Paris, France
- 1988: Computerkunst 88, Museum der Stadt Gladbeck, Wittringen Castle, Gladbeck, Germany
- 1988: Hinter den Wänden, Donaufestival, Langenlois, Austria
- 1991: Delphi Digital, Ars Electronica, Linz, Austria
- 1992: Die Auflösung der Fotografie – Der kalte Raum, Blau-Gelbe Galerie, Vienna
- 1992: The Spirit of St. Lucifer, Medien Kunst Archiv (MKA), Vienna
- 1993: Tacit Surveillance, Künstlerhaus, Vienna
- 1994: Zeit/Schnitte, Patriarchat, Wiener Festwochen, Vienna
- 1997: Verstärker/Kaskade, Künstlerhaus, Vienna
- 2003: Künstlerinnen – Positionen 1945 bis heute, Kunsthalle Krems, Krems an der Donau
- 2004: Frau im Bild. Inszenierte Weiblichkeit, Museum Moderner Kunst, Passau, Germany
- 2005/2006: Die Enzyklopädie der wahren Werte, Künstlerhaus, Vienna
- 2007: Die Liebe zu den Objekten, Niederösterreichisches Landesmuseum, St. Pölten
- 2008: Am Puls der Stadt. 2000 Jahre Karlsplatz, Wien Museum, Vienna
- 2008: Matrix. Geschlechter – Verhältnisse – Revisionen (MATRIX – gender – relations – revisions), MUSA Museum Startgalerie Artothek (MUSA), Vienna
- 2008: Werkschau XIII. Intakt – die PionierInnen, Fotogalerie Wien, Vienna
- 2009: Best of Austria, Lentos Art Museum, Linz
- 2010: raum_körper_einsatz, MUSA, Vienna
- 2012: Celebration/Me Myself & Them, Künstlerhaus, Vienna
- 2012: Margot Pilz, HERSTORY – 36.000 Years of Goddesses and Idols, Austrian Cultural Forum New York
- 2014: Aktionistinnen, Kunsthalle Krems & Forum Frohner, Krems
- 2014: Once upon my time—JAVA 1942, Künstlerhaus, Vienna
- 2015: Margot Pilz – Meilensteine. Von der performativen Fotografie zur digitalen Feldforschung, MUSA, Vienna
- 2016: The Feminist Avant-Garde of the 1970s, curated by Gabriele Schor and Anna Dannemann, The Photographers' Gallery, London, England
- 2017: Aging Pride/Die Kraft des Alters, curator Sabine Fellner, Belvedere, Vienna
- 2017: Feministische Avantgarde der 1970er Jahre aus der Sammlung Verbund, ZKM Center for Art and Media Karlsruhe
- 2017: The Feminist Avant-Garde of the 1970s, curated by Gabriele Schor and Eva Badura-Triska, MUMOK, Vienna
- 2018: WOMAN Feminist Avant-Garde of the 1970s from the SAMMLUNG VERBUND Collection, Vienna, curated by Gabriele Schor, University of Dundee
- 2018–2019, Women.Now., curator Sabine Fellner, Austrian Cultural Forum, New York (ACFNY)

== Awards ==
- 1983: Staatsstipendium für bildende Kunst
- 1985: Römerquelle Fotopreis
- 1988: Preis der Österreichischen Postsparkasse
- 1990: Theodor Körner Prize
- 1996: Pfann-Ohmann-Preis, Künstlerhaus, Vienna
- 2008: Goldener Lorbeer, Künstlerhaus, Vienna
- 2009: Goldener Lorbeer, Künstlerhaus, Vienna
- 2011: Preis der Stadt Wien für Bildende Kunst (Prize of the City of Vienna for Fine Arts)

== Bibliography ==
Pilz's work is discussed in the following:

- Aigner, Silvie; Karel, Johannes, eds. (2010). Raum_körper einsatz : positionen der skulptur [Re_figuring space : positions in sculpture]. Nürnberg: Verlag für Moderne Kunst. ISBN 978-3-86984-106-9.
- Birbaumer, Brigitte Borchardt-; Dieter, Ronte (2015). Aktionistinnen. Kunstmeile Krems. ISBN 978-3-901261-60-2.
- Ecker, Berthold; Aigner, Silvie, eds. (2015). Margot Pilz : Meilensteine : von der performativen Fotografie zur digitalen Feldforschung = Milestones : from performative photography to digital field studies. Berlin: De Gruyter. ISBN 978-3-11-045841-1.
- Schor, Gabriele, ed. (22 December 2016). The Feminist Avant-Garde of the 1970s: Works from the Sammlung Verbund, Vienna. Vienna: Prestel. ISBN 978-3-7913-5446-0.
