= Christian Eisenberger =

Austrian artist

Christian Eisenberger (born 1978 in Semriach near Graz) is an Austrian artist.

== Life ==
After attending the Ortwein school in Graz in 1999, Christian Eisenberger studied Transmediale Kunst in the class of Brigitte Kowanz at the Academy of Fine Arts Vienna from 2000 to 2004. In 2013 he participated in the artist in residence programme of one world foundation (in cooperation with Galerie Krinzinger) in Sri Lanka. Christian Eisenberger lives and works in Vienna and Semriach.

== Work ==
Christian Eisenberger initially became known for thousands of painted cardboard cutouts which he, at first anonymously, placed in public space. His motifs were social outcasts, such as immigrants or beggars. Later on, he portrayed famous figures of world history, often adorned with halos. These portraits were typically marked with a number, the last of them carrying the number 9975.1. The ephemeral nature of this early series can still be found in many of his works today. Christian Eisenberger's work as a whole defies exact categorization. However, it is often associated with Land art, Conceptual art, Arte Povera, Appropriation, Video art and others. Eisenberger's art also contains numerous references to classical genres, such as expressionist painting and sculpture. The themes around which his work revolves are equally diverse, as he treats classical subjects of art history (life, death, vanitas motives) as well as political topics, such as criticism of institutions. His art creates a universe that is complex without being melodramatic. The artist typically works in series, often elaborating individual ideas and concepts throughout several years, which causes his work to grow radially rather than linearly.

== Exhibitions (selection) ==
=== Solo exhibitions ===
- 2011: Employees Must Wash Hands Before Returning To Work, Pablo's Birthday Gallery, New York City
- 2011: HYPERKOLLABORATIVE HYPOTHESENRELEKTOR 9975/22928/12100, ES contemporary art gallery, Merano
- 2010: IMG3171PSD, Konzett Gallery, Vienna
- 2010: Metastasen – tief, Projektraum Viktor Bucher, Vienna

=== Group exhibitions ===
- 2014: André Butzer / Christian Eisenberger, Künstlerhaus KM–, Halle für Kunst & Medien, Graz
- 2012: Colombo Art Biennale – Becoming, Colombo Art Biennale, Colombo
- 2012: Der Nackte Mann, Lentos Kunstmuseum Linz, Linz
- 2012: Escape the golden cage, International Exhibition of Urban Art, Vienna
- 2012: Malerei: Prozess und Expansion, MUMOK, Vienna
- 2012: Street and Studio, Kunsthalle Wien, Vienna
- 2012: Triennale Linz 1.0, Gegenwartskunst in Österreich, Lentos Kunstmuseum Linz, Linz
- 2012: The Armory Show, New York City

== Literature ==
- Markus Gugatschka (ed.): Reserve – Help me kill me. Kerber Verlag, Bielefeld, 2012. ISBN 978-3-86678-660-8
