= Robert Menasse =

Austrian writer (born 1954)

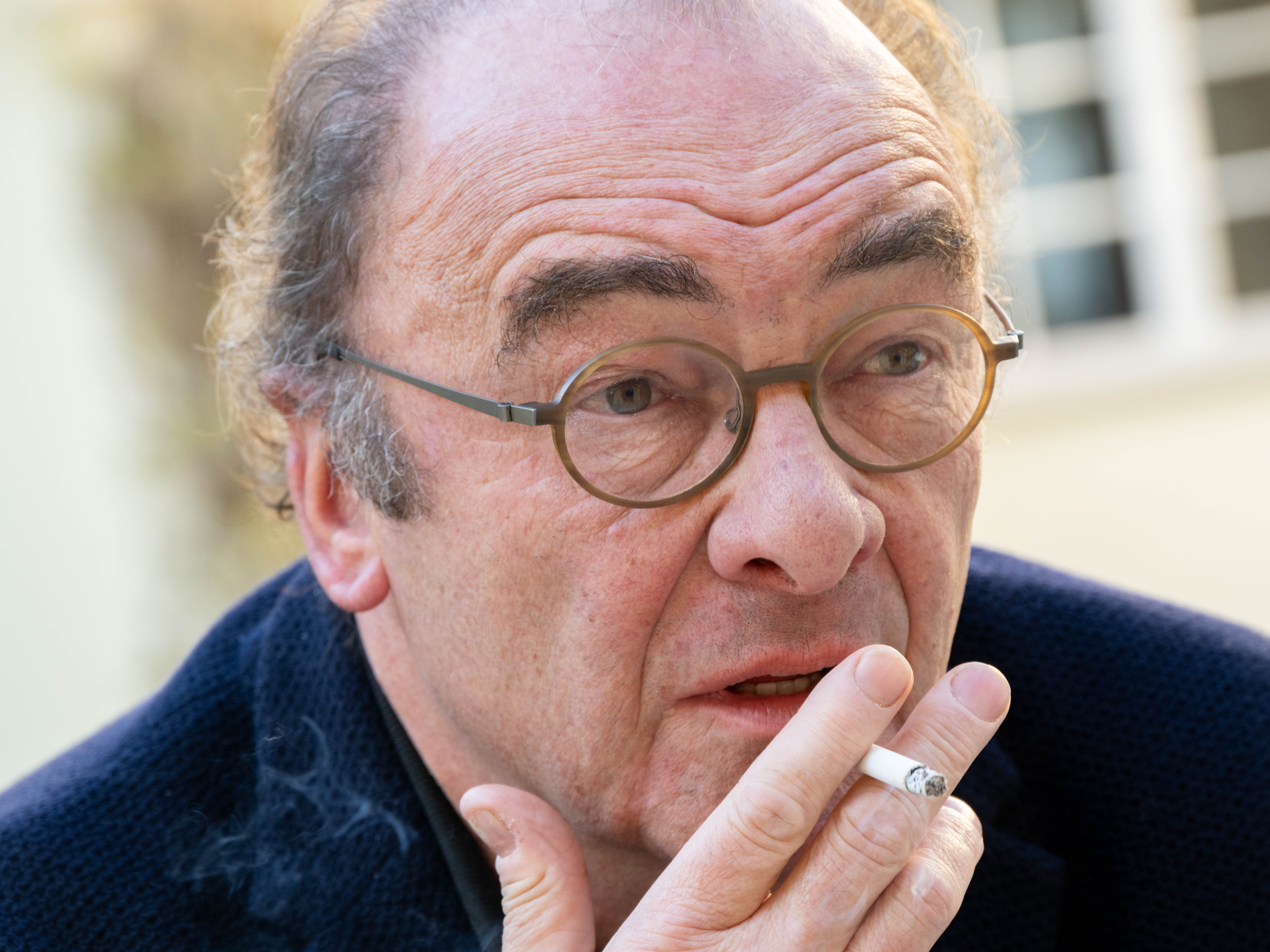
- Born: 21 June 1954 (age 72); Vienna, Austria
- Citizenship: Austrian
- Occupation: Writer
- Writing career
- Language: German

Robert Menasse (born 21 June 1954) is an Austrian writer.

== Biography ==
Menasse was born in Vienna. As an undergraduate, he studied German studies, philosophy and political science in Vienna, Salzburg and Messina. In 1980 he completed his PhD thesis "Der Typus des Außenseiters im Literaturbetrieb. Am Beispiel Hermann Schürrer" ("The outsider phenotype within literature").

Between 1981 and 1988 Menasse worked as a junior lecturer at the Institute of Literature Theory at the University of São Paulo, Brazil. He has been working as a freelance publicist, columnist and translator of novels from Portuguese into German ever since.

His first novel Sinnliche Gewissheit, published in 1988, is a semi-autobiographical tale of Austrians living in exile in Brazil. The magazine Literatur und Kritik published Menasse's first poem ("Kopfwehmut") in 1989. His later novels were Selige Zeiten, brüchige Welt (1991, translated into English as Wings of Stone ISBN 0-7145-4295-4), Schubumkehr (1995, Engl. Reverse Thrust) and Die Vertreibung aus der Hölle (2001, Engl. Expulsion from Hell).

Menasse's language is at times playful and at times subtly sarcastic. Recurring themes in his novels are loneliness and alienation within human relationships and as a result of his character's lives' circumstances. In his work Menasse often criticises what he sees as the latent form of antisemitism still widespread in the German-speaking world today.

Menasse has also written some essays on Austria (especially on Austrian identity and history; "Land ohne Eigenschaften" (1992) a.o.). More recently, he wrote about the future of Europe and the European Union, criticizing tendencies of re-nationalization (especially in Germany, but also elsewhere) and anti-European integration movements, which he interprets as a reaction to the 2008 financial crisis and the Euro area crisis ("Der europäische Landbote", 2012).

Since returning to Europe from Brazil, Menasse has mainly lived in the cities of Berlin, Vienna and Amsterdam. He currently lives in Vienna and is married. Since 2011 Menasse has been curating a writer in residence programme with the one world foundation in Sri Lanka.

His books have been translated in over twenty languages, among others: Arabic, Bask, Bulgarian, Chinese, Croatian, Czech, Danish, Dutch, English, French, Greek, Hindi, Italian, Norwegian, Polish, Portuguese, Russian, Serbian, Slovenian, Spanish, and Swedish.

Today, Menasse lives alternately in Vienna, in the Waldviertel (Forest Quarter) in Lower Austria, and in Brussels. He is the son of the footballer Hans Menasse and the brother of the journalist and writer Eva Menasse.

== Novels ==
Robert Menasse's first short story Nägelbeißen (Engl. Nail-Biting) was published in the journal Neue Wege in 1973. From 1975 to 1980 he worked on his unfinished and unpublished novel Kopfwehmut (Engl. Mind's Melancholy), a social novel set in 1970s Vienna. His first published novel, Sinnliche Gewißheit (Engl. Sensual Certainty) appeared in 1988 as the first part of a trilogy started in Brazil Trilogie der Entgeisterung (Engl. Trilogy of Dismay), which also includes the 1991 novel Selige Zeiten, brüchige Welt (Engl. Wings of Stone, 2000), which is at once a crime story, a philosophical novel and a Jewish family saga, and finally the 1995 novel Schubumkehr (Engl. Reverse Thrust, 2000) as well as the postscript Phänomenologie der Entgeisterung (1995, Engl. Phenomenology of Dismay).

In Schubumkehr, against the background of the private life of the literature teacher Roman, who was already introduced in Selige Zeiten, brüchige Welt, Menasse describes the fall of the Iron Curtain in 1989 and the breakdown of the familiar order in a small Austrian village. This novel, which is not least an artistic treatment of the spirit of the age, was awarded the Grimmelshausen Prize in 1999 and made the author a household name. As suggested already by the title of the novel Schubumkehr and in the Trilogie der Entgeisterung Menasse turns Hegel's Phenomenology of Spirit on its head. In contrast to Hegel, who assumes a development of human consciousness to all-embracing spirit, Menasse postulates a regressive development, whose final stage will be "sensual certainty", according to Hegel the most naïve form of consciousness.

In his novel Die Vertreibung aus der Hölle (2001; Engl. Expulsion from Hell) Menasse casts doubt on the objectivity of history, coupled with the personal history of the author and his Jewish roots. As a spin-off of his researches on the character and real person Menasseh Ben Israel for his novel Die Vertreibung aus der Hölle translated in ten languages, Menasse formulated the hypothesis of Abaelard‘s influence on Menasseh Ben Israel and Spinoza, published among others in his essay Enlightenment as Harmonious Strategy. In 2007 he published Don Juan de la Mancha, where he tells of more or less fictitious events from the (love) life of the newspaper editor Nathan – a mixture of listlessness, drive, lust and the search for the fulfilment of love. As a character, Nathan stands for the generation that was socialised in the 1970s with the claim for the “sexual revolution".

In 2017 Menasse published his analytical novel Die Hauptstadt (The Capital), which has been described as the first novel about Brussels as the European Union's capital, and which received the German Book Prize. The story is focused on officials from the Department of Culture, who are expected to add polish to the image of the EU Commission on its birthday. The main character in this novel, Pote, explores his family's history. This is to be accomplished with a "Big Jubilee Project" event with concentration camp survivors in Auschwitz. The life stories of characters lead the reader into six EU countries. The stage director Tom Kühnel and the dramaturg Ralf Fiedler translated the novel into a theatrical version with about twenty characters played by seven actors, which was premiered in January 2018 at the Theater am Neumarkt in Zürich. The English translation, The Capital by Jamie Bulloch, was published by MacLehose Press in February 2019.

== Essays and writings on cultural theory ==
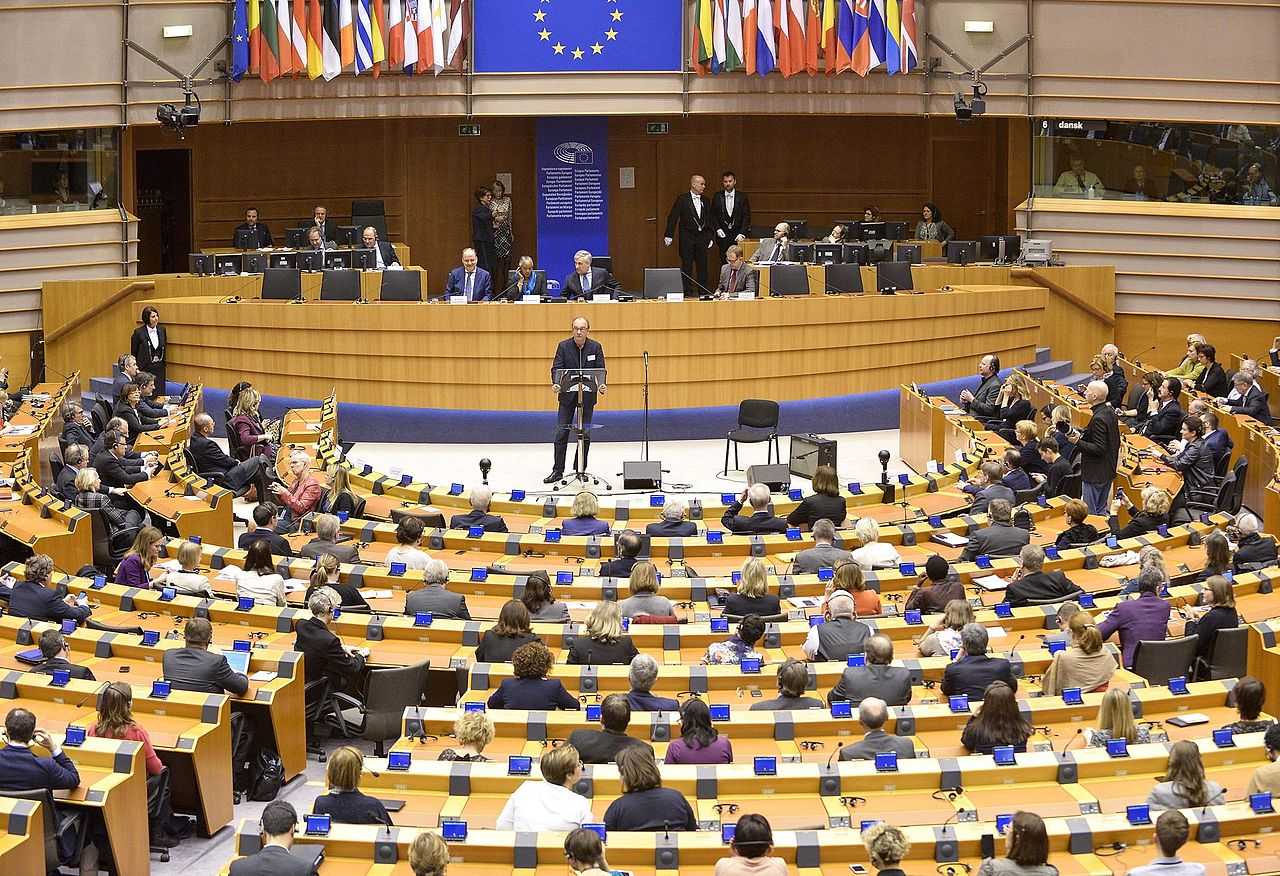
Robert Menasse addressing the plenary forum of the European Parliament in Brussels at the official ceremony to celebrate the 60th anniversary of the Rome Treaty on 21 March 2017

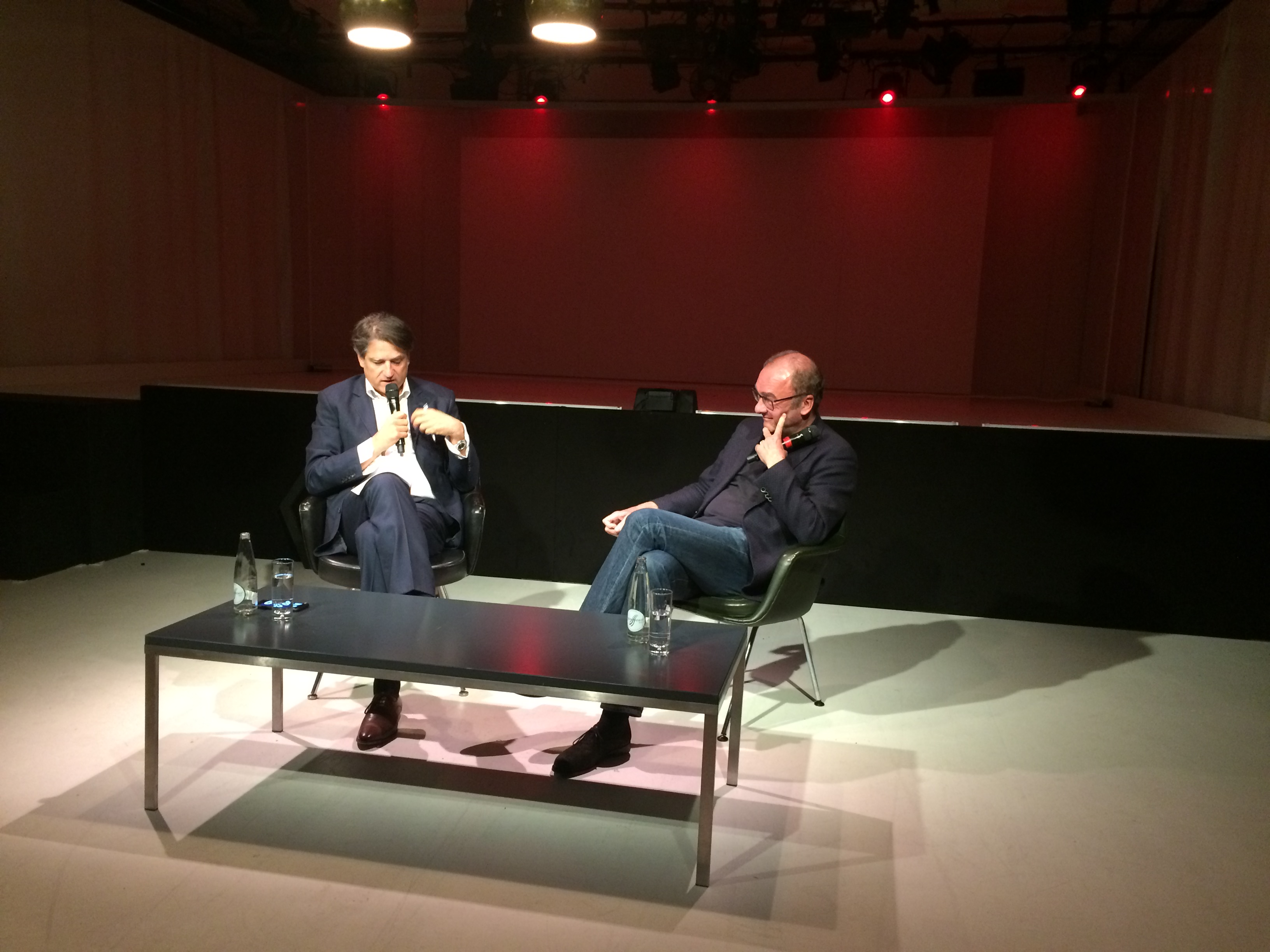
Jakob Augstein and Robert Menasse in conversation on 15 May 2017 in the Theater Neumarkt in Zurich

In his political and journalistic work, Menasse is seen as an "old-style Enlightenment thinker," whose intellectual predecessors are especially Hegel and Marx but also Georg Lukács, Ernst Bloch and the philosophers of the Frankfurt School. Essays like Die sozialpartnerschaftliche Ästhetik (1990; The Aesthetics of Social Partnership) and Das Land ohne Eigenschaften (1992; The Country without Qualities), which brought Menasse fame as an essayist, but also provoked criticism for "fouling his own nest," were followed in time by the essay collections Hysterien und andere historische Irrtümer (1996; Hysterics and Other Historical Errors) and Dummheit ist machbar (1999; Stupidity is Doable), Erklär mir Österreich (2000; Explain Austria to Me) and Das war Österreich (2005; That Was Austria). In these texts the author deals in critical-ironic way with political history, mentality history and literary history of the second Republic of Austria, takes a position on the current cultural policy situation in his homeland and recurrently draws attention to the latent continuity of Austrofascism.

Since 2005, i.e. since his Frankfurt Poetics Lecture, Die Zerstörung der Welt als Wille und Vorstellung (The Destruction of the World as Will and Representation), Menasse has increasingly devoted his essays to themes around the EU and globalisation. In this European or worldwide context Menasse criticises in particular what he sees as the deficits in democratic policies and the idea that these deficits are structurally determined, which he argues obscures the prospects of possible alternatives. In doing so he does not oppose the European Union in principle but bases his critique of democratic deficits especially in the influence and power of individual nation states, while valuing positively the purely European institutions, such as the Commission. In Der Europäische Landbote (2012; Engl. transl. 2016 as Enraged Citizens, European Peace and Democratic Deficits: Or Why the Democracy Given to Us Must Become One We Fight For The European Messenger), he draws a portrait of the non-petty-minded supranational organs and bureaucracies of the EU in Brussels and further develops the "Habsburg Myth" of Claudio Magris into a "European Myth". This also leads to a different and more positive retrospective of the Habsburg Monarchy. In this connection Menasse also speaks in favour of the specific vision and its realization of a “European Republic” formulated together with the political scientist Ulrike Guérot on the basis of a Europe of regions beyond the nation states.

=== Controversy about fake quotations ===
Menasse commenting

In December 2018, Welt am Sonntag revealed that Robert Menasse had fabricated several quotes attributed to Walter Hallstein (1901-1982), one of the founding fathers of the EU) to support his argument for overcoming nation states. Menasse had been using these alleged quotes in many of his articles, essays and speeches since 2013, and they had been taken up in parliamentary debates and publications by other authors. Menasse defended himself arguing that these sentences reflected what Hallstein had meant and that Hallstein "would have had nothing against" Menasse invoking his authority in this way. However, historian Heinrich August Winkler disputed Menasse's interpretation of Hallstein's actual statements on the matter.

== Prizes, awards and scholarships ==
- 1987: State scholarship for literature of the Austrian ministry of education and literature
- 1989: Encouragement prize for literature of the city of Vienna
- 1990: Heimito von Doderer Prize
- 1991: State scholarship for literature of the Austrian ministry of education and literature
- 1992: Hans Erich Nossack encouragement prize for prose of the Kulturkreis der Deutschen Wirtschaft im Bundesverband der Deutschen Industrie Köln
- 1992: Theodor Körner Prize
- 1992/1993: Elias Canetti-scholarship of the city of Vienna
- 1994: Berlin residency in the context of the DAAD-scholarship
- 1994: Marburger Literaturpreis i.e. Literaturpreis der Universitätsstadt Marburg und des Landkreises Marburg-Biedenkopf
- 1994: Encouragement prize for novels of the Austrian ministry of education and literature
- 1994: Alexander Sacher Masoch Prize
- 1996: Hugo-Ball-Preis of the city of Pirmasens
- 1998: Österreichischer Staatspreis für Kulturpublizistik
- 1999: Grimmelshausen-Preis
- 1999: Writer-in-residence in Amsterdam
- 2002: Joseph Breitbach Prize
- 2002: Friedrich Hölderlin Prize
- 2002: Lion-Feuchtwanger-Preis
- 2002: Marie Luise Kaschnitz Prize
- 2003: Erich Fried Prize
- 2006: Knight of the Ordre des Arts et Lettres
- 2007: Prix Amphi of the University of Lille for the novel Die Vertreibung aus der Hölle publ. in French as Chassés de l’enfer for the best non-French novel
- 2010: Goldenes Wiener Verdienstzeichen
- 2012: Österreichischer Kunstpreis für Literatur
- 2013: Donauland-Sachbuchpreis for Der europäische Landbote. Die Wut der Bürger und der Friede Europas
- 2013: Heinrich Mann Prize
- 2013: Das politische Buch (Engl. The political book), prize of the Friedrich Ebert Stiftung
- 2014: Max Frisch Prize of the city of Zurich
- 2014: Großes Goldenes Ehrenzeichen des Landes Niederösterreich
- 2015: Niederösterreichischer Kulturpreis – Würdigungspreis
- 2015: 'Prix du livre européen' (Engl. European Book Prize), that seeks to promote European values, and to contribute to European citizens' better understanding of the European Union as a cultural entity.
- 2017: German Book Prize
- 2018: Walter-Hasenclever-Literaturpreis of the city of Aachen

With the prize money that Robert Menasse received for the Austrian State Prize (1998) he re-founded the Jean Améry- Preis für Europäische Essayistik, whose winners so far have been Lothar Baier (1982), Barbara Sichtermann (1985), Mathias Greffrath (1988), Reinhard Merkel (1991), Franz Schuh (2000), Doron Rabinovici (2002), Michael Jeismann (2004), Drago Jančar (2007), Imre Kertész (2009), Dubravka Ugrešić (2012), Adam Zagajewski (2016) and Karl-Markus Gauß (2018).

== Bibliography ==
- Sinnliche Gewißheit. Roman. Rowohlt, Reinbek bei Hamburg 1988, ISBN 978-3-518-39188-4
- Die sozialpartnerschaftliche Ästhetik. Essays zum österreichischen Geist. Sonderzahl, Vienna 1990. ISBN 978-3-85449-027-2
- Selige Zeiten, brüchige Welt. Roman. Residenz, Salzburg/Vienna 1991. ISBN 978-3-518-38812-9. Translated into the English: Wings of Stone. Calder Publications Ltd. 2000, transl. by David Bryer. ISBN 978-0-7145-4295-9
- Das Land ohne Eigenschaften. Essay zur österreichischen Identität. Sonderzahl, Vienna 1992. ISBN 978-3-518-38987-4
- Phänomenologie der Entgeisterung. Geschichte vom verschwindenden Wissen. Suhrkamp, Frankfurt am Main 1995. ISBN 978-3-518-38889-1
- Schubumkehr. Novel. Residenz, Salzburg/Vienna 1995, ISBN 978-3-7017-0918-2
- Hysterien und andere historische Irrtümer. Nachwort von Rüdiger Wischenbart. Sonderzahl, Vienna 1996. ISBN 978-3-85449-099-9
- Überbau und Underground. Suhrkamp, Frankfurt am Main 1997, ISBN 978-3-518-39148-8
- With Elisabeth Menasse und Eva Menasse: Die letzte Märchenprinzessin. Illustrated by Gerhard Haderer. Suhrkamp, Frankfurt am Main 1997. ISBN 978-3-518-40950-3
- With Elisabeth Menasse und Eva Menasse: Der mächtigste Mann. Illustrated by Kenneth Klein. Deuticke, Zsolnay, Vienna/Munich 1998. ISBN 978-3-216-30461-2
- Dummheit ist machbar. Begleitende Essays zum Stillstand der Republik. Sonderzahl, Vienna 1999. ISBN 978-3-85449-155-2
- Erklär mir Österreich. Essays zur österreichischen Geschichte. Suhrkamp, Frankfurt am Main 2000. ISBN 978-3-518-39661-2
- Die Vertreibung aus der Hölle. Roman. Suhrkamp, Frankfurt am Main 2001. ISBN 3-518-41267-1
- Das war Österreich. Gesammelte Essays zum Land ohne Eigenschaften. Hrsg. v. Eva Schörkhuber. Suhrkamp, Frankfurt am Main 2005. ISBN 978-3-518-45691-0
- Die Zerstörung der Welt als Wille und Vorstellung – Frankfurter Poetikvorlesungen. Edition Suhrkamp 2464, Frankfurt am Main 2006. ISBN 978-3-518-12464-2
- Das Paradies der Ungeliebten. Political theater play. Debut performance on 7 October 2006 at the Staatstheater Darmstadt. ISBN 978-3-518-12490-1
- Don Juan de la Mancha oder die Erziehung der Lust. Novel. Suhrkamp, Frankfurt am Main 2007. ISBN 978-1-84688-081-0. Translated into the English: Don Juan de la Mancha or an Education in Pleasure – Novel, Alma Books/Calder Publications 2009. ISBN 978-1-84688-081-0
- Das Ende des Hungerwinters. Lesung- Hoffmann und Campe, Hamburg 2008, ISBN 978-3-455-30595-1.
- Doktor Hoechst – Ein Faustspiel. A Tragedy. A theater play. Debut performance on 25 April 2009, at the Staatstheater Darmstadt. Production: Hermann Schein. ISBN 978-3-552-05643-5
- Ich kann jeder sagen: Erzählungen vom Ende der Nachkriegsordnung. Suhrkamp, Frankfurt am Main 2009. ISBN 978-3-518-42114-7. Translated into the English: Anyone Can Say "I". Tales from the End of the Post-war Era. Ariadne Books 2009, transl. by Thomas S. and Abby J. Hansen. ISBN 978-1-57241-175-3
- Permanente Revolution der Begriffe. Vorträge zum Begriff der Abklärung, Essays. Suhrkamp, Frankfurt am Main 2009, ISBN 978-3-518-12592-2
- Der Europäische Landbote, Die Wut der Bürger und der Friede Europas oder Warum die geschenkte Demokratie einer erkämpften weichen muss. Zsolnay, Vienna 2012, ISBN 978-3-552-05616-9. Translated into the English: Enraged Citizens, European Peace and Democratic Deficits: Or Why the Democracy Given to Us Must Become One We Fight For. Seagull Books 2016, transl. by Craig Decker, ISBN 978-0-85742-362-7
- Heimat ist die schönste Utopie. Reden (wir) über Europa. Edition Suhrkamp, Berlin 2014, ISBN 978-3-518-12689-9
- "Weil Europa sich ändern muss." Im Gespräch mit Gesine Schwan, Robert Menasse, Hauke Brunkhorst. Springer VS, Wiesbaden 2015, ISBN 978-3-658-01391-2
- Was ist Literatur. Ein Miniatur-Bildungsroman. Bernstein-Verlag, Siegburg 2015, ISBN 978-3-945426-09-8
- Europe. The Future of History. Catalogue and exhibition at the Kunsthaus Zurich (Zuercher Kunstgesellschaft). Cathérine Hug und Robert Menasse (eds.), with contributions by a.o. Melinda Nadj Abonji, Zygmunt Bauman, Horst Bredekamp, Burcu Dogramaci, Julia Kristeva, Konrad Paul Liessmann, Thomas Maissen, NZZ libro 2015. ISBN 978-3-03810-089-8
- Feiert das Leben! Catalogue and exhibition at the Kunsthistorisches Museum Wien in Vienna. Robert Menasse and Cathérine Hug (eds.), with contributions by Kader Attia, Barbara Coudenhove-Kalergi, Daniel Knorr, Manuela Laubenberger, Erik van Lieshout, Teresa Margolles, Arnulf Rainer, Hans Schabus, Hubert Scheibl, Daniel Spoerri, Nives Widauer und Josef Zotter, Vienna 2016. ISBN 978-3-903004-62-7
- Europa. Akzente, 3 /2016. Robert Menasse and Jo Lendle (eds.), with contributions by Lily Brett, György Dragomán, Dana Grigorcea, Zbigniew Herbert, Elfriede Jelinek, Ingo Schulze, Adam Zagajewski, among others. Carl Hanser Verlag, Munich 2016. ISBN 978-3-446-25547-0
- Warum? Das Vermächtnis des Jean Améry. Robert Menasse on Jean Améry, his impact and topicality (in an interview with Cathérine Hug). Bernstein-Verlag, Siegburg 2016. ISBN 978-3-945426-21-0
- Kritik der Europäischen Vernunft – Critique de la raison européene – A Critique of European Reason. Festrede vor dem Europäischen Parlament: 60 Jahre Römische Verträge. Including the “Manifesto for the foundation of a European Republic” co-written by Robert Menasse and Ulrike Guérot. Tri-Lingual Deutsch/Français/English. Bernstein-Verlag, Siegburg 2017. ISBN 978-3-945426-28-9.
- Die Hauptstadt, Novel. Suhrkamp, Berlin 2017. ISBN 978-3-518-42758-3
- Die Erweiterung, Novel. Suhrkamp, Berlin 2023. ISBN 978-3-518-47361-0
- Die Welt von morgen: Ein souveränes demokratisches Europa - und seine Feinde, Essay. Suhrkamp, Berlin 2024. ISBN 978-3-518-43165-8

== See also ==
- List of Austrian writers
