= Ulrike Guérot =

German political scientist (1964-)

Ulrike Guérot (2026)

Ulrike Beate Guérot (née Hammelstein; born 11 September 1964 in Grevenbroich, West Germany) is a Berlin-based German political thinker and Founder and Director of the European Democracy Lab (EDL). In April 2016, the University for Continuing Education Krems appointed Ulrike Guérot as Professor for European Policy and the Study of Democracy. She was the head of the Department for European Policy and the Study of Democracy. From 2021 until March 2023, she held the professorship for European Politics at the University of Bonn.

At the end of February 2023, her employment was terminated by the University of Bonn due to violations of academic standards. This followed a complaint from the university's student parliament that Guérot was damaging the university's reputation with statements in her comments about the 2022 Russian invasion of Ukraine Guérot appealed against the judgment of the first instance of the resulting labor court case which had confirmed the dismissal but on 30 September 2025 it was announced that the appeal had been rejected, making the termination final.

== Education ==
Guérot studied Political Sciences, history and philosophy and got her PhD from University of Münster, Germany, in 1995 with a dissertation on the French Socialist Party and Europe. She also holds a MA in Political Science and International Relations from Sciences Po (the Paris Institute of Political Studies).

== Career ==
From 1992 to 1995, Guérot worked in Bonn as a parliamentary assistant in the office of Karl Lamers, MP, then spokesperson of the German Christian Democratic Party for foreign affairs. In this period, she contributed to the so-called "Schäuble-Lamers" paper on core-Europe of 1994. In 1995, she moved to Paris and worked first as a Director of Communication for the Association for the Monetary Union of Europe (AMUE); and then as Chargée de Mission for the Paris-based think tank Notre Europe, under the auspices of former president of the EU Commission, Jacques Delors. Then she moved to the US and served from 1998 to 2000 as assistant professor at the Paul H. Nitze School for Advanced International Studies in the Department for European Studies of Johns Hopkins University, in Washington, D.C.

After her return to Berlin in 2000, Guérot took over the European Studies Unit at the German Council on Foreign Relations (DGAP) until 2003 and then moved as Foreign Policy Director to the Berlin office of the German Marshall Fund (GMF).

From 2007 onwards, Guérot opened and built up the Berlin office of the European Council on Foreign Relations (ECFR) and served until 2013 as its first director. During this time, Ulrike Guérot focused in her numerous publications on various aspects of European integration policies, the process of European constitutionalization and European foreign policy, especially on Franco-German and transatlantic relations. During this time, she established the program "Germany in Europe" at the ECFR, analyzing the shifts of the German role in the European Union. Within this program, she published two books, firstly What Does Germany Think about Europe? (ed. together with Jacqueline Hénard) in 2011; and secondly Germany in Europe: A Blog Chronicle of the Euro-Crisis in 2013.

In spring 2012, Guérot was Visiting Scholar at the German House of New York University (NYU) and in Fall 2014, she had a guest status at the WZB Berlin Social Science Center.

In September 2014, she founded, together with Victoria Kupsch, the European Democracy Lab (EDL), which is attached to the European School of Governance (eusg), Berlin, in order to focus on the future of European Democracy post-euro crisis. The core idea of the Lab is the development of a Res Publica Europeae, a political entity of Europe as a Republic. On this, Ulrike Guérot has widely published, most recently in the annual edition 2014 of the Berlin-Brandenburg Academy of Sciences. Ulrike Guérot has sketched out her idea of Europe as a Republic in a speech at the Berlin conference re:publica. The idea of Europe as a Republic was also republished at the Digital Bauhaus Conference for societal design in Weimar 2015 and represented at the Summer Academy 2015 of the American Chautauqua Institute.

In April 2013, Ulrike Guérot and Austrian novelist Robert Menasse published a "Manifesto for a European Republic", in which they draw attention to the current tensions and developments of the European Union and call for the foundation of a European Republic. The Manifesto has been tied to an appeal for a new Europe (#newEurope),[10] which so far has been signed by a variety of European academics, intellectuals, artists and policy makers, such as French star economist Thomas Piketty, Club-of Rome member Ernst Ulrich von Weizsäcker or professor Gesine Schwan. Simultaneously, Guérot worked with German conceptual artist Valeska Peschke to develop the project "Amikejo". This artistic interpretation of Europe aims to focus on the idea of European friendship. Since April 2016 Ulrike Guérot heads the Department for European Policy and the Study of Democracy at Donauuniversität Krems. Her first book, Why Europe needs to become a Republic! A political utopia was published in the same month by Dietz Verlag. In May 2017 her second book A new civil war: The open Europe and its enemies will be published by Ullstein Verlag.

Guérot has widely published on European, transatlantic and international affairs in German and European newspapers and she is frequently invited to comment in European media on a range of issues. For her engagement with respect to European integration, she was awarded in 2003 with the French cross of honor, L'Ordre national du Mérite. In the debate on a Greek exit of the Eurozone, she has strongly engaged publicly against a Grexit.

In autumn 2013, Guérot was part of the official delegation of the German Federal President Joachim Gauck on his state visit to France.

Guérot is further teaching classes at Viadrina European University in Frankfurt/ Oder and Bucerius Law School in Hamburg. She is an honorary board member of the European Professional Group of the Berlin Europa-Union Deutschland.

Along with Sebastian Dullien, Guérot has emerged as a critic of ordoliberalism and its role in the Eurozone crisis. Writing in 2012, the authors assert how ordoliberalism is central to the German approach to euro crisis resolution, which has often led to conflicts with other European countries.

In the light of the COVID-19 pandemic in May 2020, Ulrike Guérot and Lorenzo Marsili called for a "European republic of equals" where every citizen could enjoy the same social protections, benefit from the same economic support and pay the same taxes.

In 2021, the University of Bonn gave her a professorship for European Policy, although she was facing accusations of having plagiarized large parts of her bestselling book. On February 24, 2023, it was reported that she had been separated from her professorship at Bonn due to findings of plagiarism.

== Controversial Russia stance ==
Ulrike Guérot has been accused of victim blaming in the context of the 2022 Russian invasion of Ukraine. She was criticized for her claims that Ukraine had provoked Russia and that Putin only wanted security guarantees. Consequently, the student parliament of the University of Bonn unanimously called on Guérot to stop making statements on the subject that damaged the reputation of the university. Guérot was accused of making unfounded claims, such as claiming that German weapons deliveries made Germany a party to the war and denying Ukraine's right to self-defense. She co-wrote a book, in which she accused Ukraine of starting a war with Russia on behalf of the West. It has been criticized by historian Martin Aust for conspiracy-theoretical thinking without any scientific merit.

In February 2023, Guérot was one of the initial signers of Manifest für Frieden, a petition calling for an end to military support to Ukraine in the wake of the 2022 Russian invasion of Ukraine.

== Other activities ==
- World Economic Forum (WEF), Member of the Europe Policy Group (since 2017)
- European Council on Foreign Relations (ECFR), Member

== Personal life ==
Guérot has two grown-up sons. She is divorced from the French diplomat Olivier Guérot.

== Publications ==
- Guérot, Ulrike (2016): Warum Europa eine Republik werden muss. Dietz Verlag
- Guérot, Ulrike (2015): Marine Le Pen und die Metamorphose der französischen Republik, in: Leviathan Heft 2/2015, S. 139–174
- Hénard, Jacqueline; Guérot, Ulrike (2011) “Was denkt Deutschland zu Europa?” German 2011; French 2012
