= Theodor Körner Prize =

Austrian award

The Theodor Körner Prize (German: Theodor-Körner-Preis) is a set of annual Austrian awards bestowed by the Theodor Körner Fund in recognition of cultural and/or scientific advances.

The prize is awarded at the University of Vienna. The prize is one of Austria's most prestigious awards in the arts and science.

== History ==
In 1953, on the occasion of his 80th birthday, Federal President Theodor Körner declined all gifts for him and asked that a fund be created instead for the promotion of arts and sciences.

== Terms ==
Projects and works that may be submitted include scientific papers in the fields of humanities and culture, medicine, science and technology, law, social science and economics. In the arts field, works from fine arts, photography, literature, and musical composition are considered. With some exceptions, scientists and artists may not be older than 40 years. The prize is awarded for "work in progress" that is, the work submitted has not been completed. The decisive factor is the general scientific or artistic quality. The work must be completed within the deadline foreseen in the application.

The projects are submitted to an independent advisory board composed of experts from the arts and sciences. Based on the board's recommendations, the trustees determine the winners.

The amount of prize money is determined by the available funds and the number of submitted and eligible works. Two-thirds of the prize money is given at the awards ceremony, and one-third upon completion of the project.

== Selected laureates ==
- Otto König (1954)
- Maria Lassnig (1955)
- Gottfried von Einem (1955)
- Vera Ferra-Mikura (1956)
- Helmut Zilk (1959)
- Hertha Firnberg (1959)
- Herbert Tichy (1959)
- Günther Nenning (1960)
- Werner Ogris (1961)
- Ortwin Gamber (1962)
- Friederike Mayröcker (1963)
- Arnulf Rainer (1964)
- Hans Otto Siebeck (1964)
- Hans Otto Siebeck (1965)
- Andreas Kohl (1966)
- Werner Schneyder (1966)
- Franz Kain (1966)
- Wendelin Schmidt-Dengler (1968)
- Josef Maria Horváth (1968)
- Andreas Okopenko (1968)
- Ingrid Leodolter (1969)
- Ludwig Christian Attersee (1972)
- Gottfried Helnwein (1974)
- Ulrike Truger (1977)
- Elfriede Gerstl (1978)
- F. Scott Hess (1981)
- Hubert Sielecki (1982)
- Renée Schröder (1984)
- Elfriede Czurda (1984)
- Wolfgang Neuber (1985)
- Barbara Neuwirth (1986)
- Clemens Jabloner (1988)
- Margot Pilz (1990)
- Karin Berger (1991)
- Robert Menasse (1992)
- Bernd Richard Deutsch (1997)
- Gerhard Präsent (1997)
- Dine Petrik (1998)
- Paul Videsott (2001)
- Thomas Mölg (2003)
- Erika Weinzierl (2004)
- Emmanuelle Charpentier (2009)
