= Alexander Sacher Masoch Prize =

The Alexander Sacher Masoch Prize is a literary award which is conferred by the Literaturhaus, Vienna. The prize, worth 7,000 euros, is to support young Austrian writers. It was created in 1994 by the widow of the writer Alexander Sacher-Masoch (1901–1972) and was initially awarded every three years.

== Recipients ==
- 2012 Doreen Daume (Translators' Prize)
- 2006 Grazer Autorenversammlung
- 2000 Kathrin Röggla
- 1997 Elfriede Czurda
- 1994 Robert Menasse
