= Ulrike Lienbacher =

Austrian artist

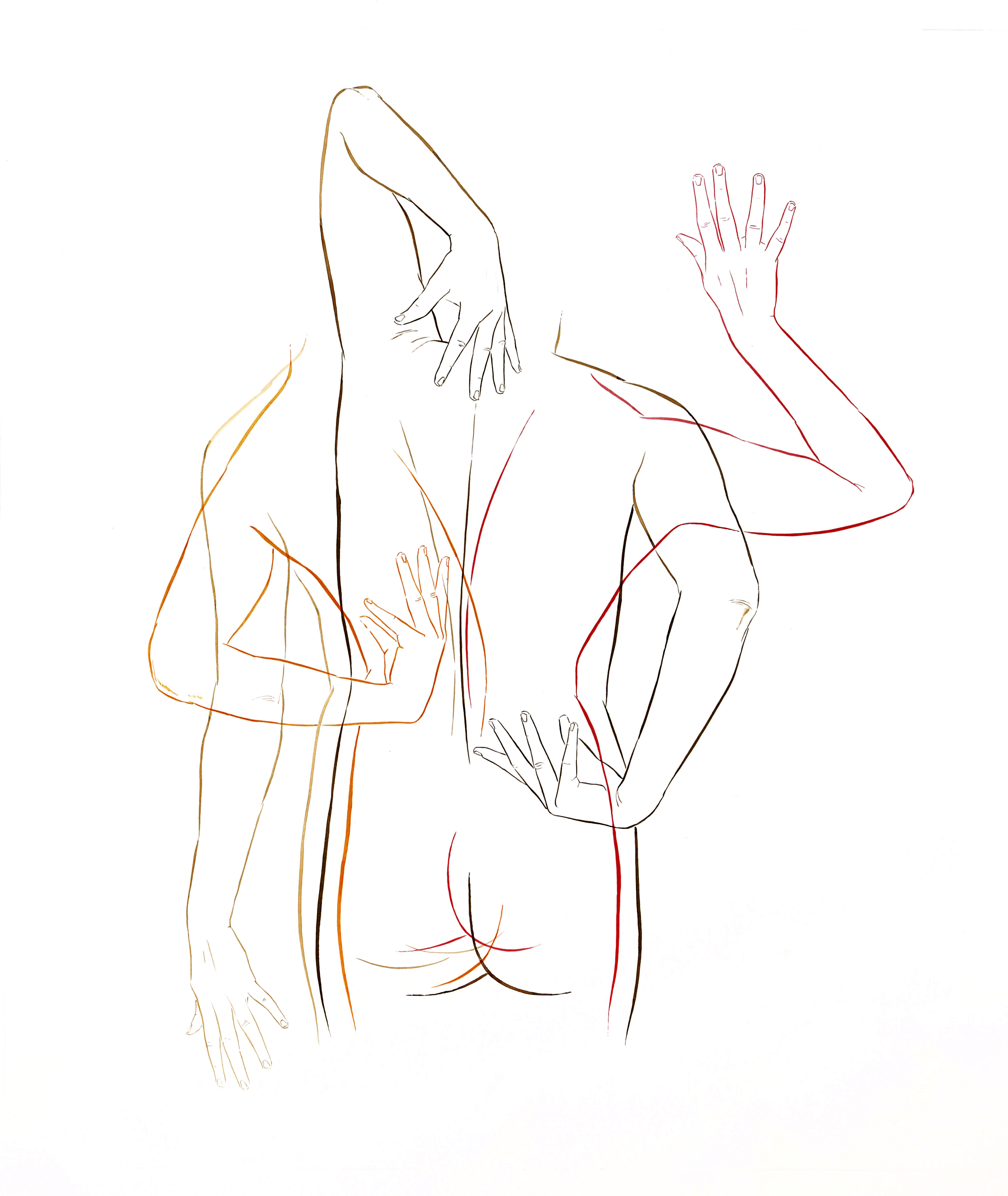
Ulrike Lienbacher – untitled. 2016 Ink 128x108 cm

Ulrike Lienbacher (born 1963 in Oberndorf bei Salzburg) is an Austrian artist. She works in various media and lives in Salzburg and Vienna.

== Biography ==
Lienbacher studied sculpture at the Mozarteum University in Salzburg from 1981 to 1987 and has been active as an artist since the late 1980s. She was appointed president of the Salzburger Kunstverein for a term of office in 2001. She led the sculpture class at the Mozarteum University from 2017 until 2022.

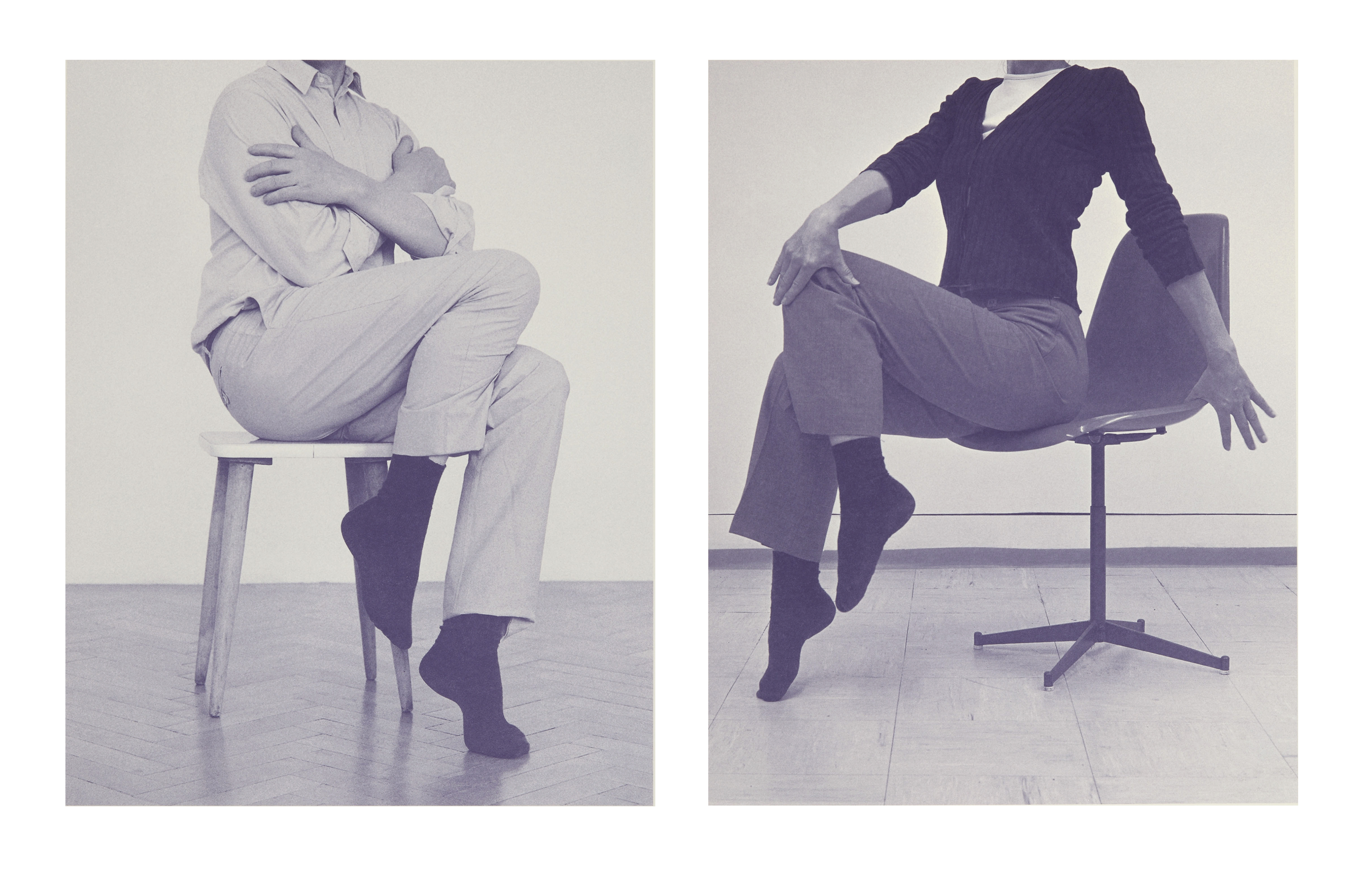
Ulrike Linbacher – Two sheets from: Pin Up Exercises, 2001, each 42x34 cm, Offset Print

She works in the media of drawing, sculpture and photography and adopts a specific, discrete approach for each: generally speaking, it is the difference between the media that Lienbacher is interested in. In her art she deals with the human body, especially under the aspects of optimization, standardisation, supervision and performance. She explores the dependency system of social norms and regulations as well as notions of discipline and control: it depicts the human body within ‘a culture of hygiene and health’, as a "bearer of socio-cultural history into which the social value system is inscribed".

== Exhibitions (selection) ==
- 2021 Wilde Kindheit, Lentos Art Museum
- 2020 Schwarz Weiß & Grau, Albertina, Vienna
- 2019 all natural. 100% Sammlungen, Museum der Moderne Salzburg
- 2019 represent Bundeskanzleramt, Vienna
- 2017 Die innere Haut – Kunst und Scham, MARTa Herford
- 2017 ICON – Idea.Ideal.Inspiration, Galerie Krinzinger, Wien
- 2016 Kunst-Musik-Tanz, Staging the Derra de Moroda Dance Archives, Museum der Moderne Salzburg
- 2016 The Body Politic, Photo Museum Ireland
- 2016 Mapping the Body, Galerie im Taxispalais, Innsbruck
- 2015 o p t i m a l, Galerie Krinzinger, Vienna
- 2014 Bricolage, Kunsthaus Nexus, Saalfelden
- 2013 Hohe Dosis. Recherchen zum Fotografischen Heute, Fotohof, Salzburg
- 2012 Interieurs, Modelle, Galerie Krinzinger Projekte, curated_by, Wien
- 2012 At Your Service, Technisches Museum Wien
- 2012 Parallelwelt Zirkus, Kunsthalle Wien
- 2012 Sport in der Kunst, MOCAK, Museum for Contemporary Art Kraków
- 2010 Elitekörper // Revolte, Salzburger Kunstverein
- 2010 Display, Fotogalerie Wien
- 2009 Printed Matter, Fotomuseum Winterthur
- 2008 Nach 1970, aus der Sammlung der Albertina, Albertina, Wien
- 2008 Cutting Realities, Austrian Cultural Forum New York
- 2007 Galerie Krinzinger, Wien
- 2007 Ich und Du Wir und Es, Billboards, Kunsthaus Bregenz
- 2006 Galerie im Taxispalais, Innsbruck
- 2004 Diaries and Dreams, Ursula Blickle Stiftung, Kraichtal
- 2003 Künstlerinnen – Positionen 1945 bis heute, Kunsthalle Krems
- 2002 Aufräumen, MAK – Galerie, Museum für angewandte Kunst, Vienna
- 2002 Pin Up Übungen, Der Transparente Raum (von VALIE EXPORT), Vienna
- 2001 Landesgalerie Oberösterreich, Linz
- 2001 Pin Up Übungen / 10 + 10 Fotografien, Camera Austria, Graz
- 2001 Gefesselt – entfesselt. Österreichische Kunst des 20. Jahrhunderts, Galeria Zachęta, Warsaw
- 2000 Ulrike Lienbacher, Galerie Krinzinger, Vienna
- 2000 Lebt und arbeitet in Wien, Kunsthalle, Vienna
- 1999 Nippes, Rupertinum, Museum der Moderne, Salzburg
- 1995 Grazer Werkgruppe, Neue Galerie, Studio, Graz

== Artworks in public spaces ==
- 2016: Farbfilter, Seniorenwohnheim Hellbrunn, Salzburg
- 2016/17: Die Bank vor dem Haus, City Government Building / Haus der Volkskulturen, Salzburg
- 2010: Kreisverkehr, Gänserndorf, Lower Austria
- 2007: Fliegender Teppich, Bundesgymnasium Vöcklabruck, Upper Austria
- 2007: Gestaltung des Mehrzweckraums, Seniorenzentrum Franz Hillinger, Linz
- 2002: Verkehrte Idylle, Gemeindebau Brandmayrgasse, Vienna
- 1999: design of the public square in front of Höhere Bundeslehranstalt für wirtschaftliche Berufe, Salzburg

== Books ==
- 2013 nude, pensive. With texts by Elke Krasny, Thomas Trummer. Edited by Hemma Schmutz. Salzburg: FOTOHOF edition. ISBN 978-3-902675-77-4
- 2007 Katalog. With texts by Reinhard Braun, Silvia Eiblmayr, August Ruhs. Edited by Silvia Eiblmayr / Galerie im Taxispalais. Vienna: Comet Books. ISBN 978-3-9502046-6-7
- 2005 Rapunzel, Rapunzel. With a text by Stella Rollig. Vienna: Comet Books. ISBN 3-9502046-3-6
- 2001 Ulrike Lienbacher. With a text by Martin Hochleitner. Edited by Oberösterreichisches Landesmuseum. Weitra: publication N 1 / Bibliothek der Provinz. ISBN 3-85252-235-8
- 2000 4 Hefte. With a text by Christian Kravagna. Vienna: Galerie Krinzinger. ISBN 3-901756-17-5
- 1994 Ulrike Lienbacher. With texts by Silvia Eiblmayr. Edited by Ulrike Lienbacher and Salzburger Kunstverein. Salzburg: Salzburger Kunstverein. ISBN 3-901264-09-4

== Awards ==
- 2009 Irma von Troll-Borostyáni-Award: Award-winner of Salzburg
- 2001 Förderpreis für Bildende Kunst des Bundes (Outstanding Artist Award)
- 2000 Großer Kunstpreis des Landes Salzburg
