= Serge Mouangue =

Cameroonian-born artist and designer

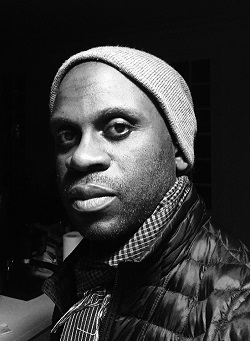
- Born: Yaoundé
- Organization: Wafrica

Serge Mouangue is a Cameroonian born designer and artist, based in Paris, France. He has worked in various design fields and is known for his series of Japanese/Cameroonian art pieces, from which he has gained notoriety in the art world. His art style is based upon ideas of shared belonging, identity, and the similarities between cultures.

== Early life and education ==
Mouangue was born in Yaoundé, Cameroon. When Mouangue was young, his parents moved their family to Paris. The family moved into a disadvantaged Parisian suburb, inhabited mostly by immigrants. Mouangue's father wanted him to become a judge or engineer, but eventually accepted Mouangue's choice to develop his creative talent. Mouangue later attended schools for interior and industrial design. As part of his course at the ENSCI in Paris, he travelled to Australia on a placement year. There he met and worked with Nobel Prize winning architect Glen Murcutt. Whilst in Australia, he also met his wife, and had his first child. He later travelled to China to work on footwear design.

== Career ==
Following his schooling, whilst in Australia, Mouangue was approached by Renault and asked to join their team as a designer. He returned to France to work with the company. Mouangue was later sent to work in Japan, as part of the Renault-Nissan Alliance. He worked as part of the Creative Box Inc. a think tank run by Nissan. Whilst working in Japan, Mouangue worked on concept cars such as the 'Kwid' concept car, a car tailored to the clientele of India. Mouangue worked in Japan for five years, but has since stopped working for Renault and now operates as a small business start-up and design correspondent, currently working closely with sustainable materials developer "WooDoo".

Mouangue has continuously drawn and designed in his own time, alongside his career. In Japan, he chose to embark on a side-project aimed at portraying his cultural experiences as a Cameroonian in Japan. His first major artistic project was a series of kimono, developed with a couple traditional kimono makers, first Tokyo based kimono designer Kururi, and then Kyoto-based kimono and fabric designer and producer Odasho, in 2007. His creative platform "Wafrica", was developed as a way to keep creative ownership of his work. Later art pieces such as "Blood Brothers" gained critical acclaim and were exhibited on an international level. Mouangue became a fellow of TED in 2011. Subsequent works include a range of scents, live performances, and collaborative installations with Toyota.

In November 2020, Mouangue participated in a Chatham House, UK-Africa investment summit, to discuss methods of sustainable investment and international cooperation. He also had his artwork used by editor Ashley Bellet in her book "New Approaches to Decolonizing Fashion History and Period Styles, Re-Fashioning Pedagogies" a book outlining concepts similar to Mouangue's third aesthetic concept.

In 2024, Mouangue secured his first solo exhibition in Japan at Marubeni Gallery in Tokyo. Running for one month, the exhibition focuses on the amalgamation of cultural influences in Mouangue's work, incorporating his Kimonos, masks and other works. Concepts like the third aesthetic are used to indicate the work's ability to rise above tradition and cultural rigidity. In 2024 his work was also featured in the Sennyuji Temple Shariden Hall in Japan, another exhibition where his work took centre stage, further solidifying his artistic status in Japan.

Forest 森, crafted with Studio Berengo for Glasstress 2026.

Mouangue was commissioned by AKAA in their 2025 exhibition to display his collection of works named "The Third Aesthetic". As well as pieces such as the Seven Sisters, he showcased more recent works such as "Les Lucioles" and "TransAppearance". 2025 also presented Mouangue opportunities to showcase his work in two biennale, once in Venice and also at the Dakar biennale. Mouangue's involvement in the Venice exhibiting circuit was further solidified during 2026 where he was a primary artist in Glasstress, an event celebrating contemporary glass designers from around the globe. With the aid of renowned glass workers at Berengo Studio, Mouangue produced Forest 森, a set of sculptures depicting Pygmy tribe members, celebrating their link to the bounties of forests and through the choice of white glass, their link to Japanese Shinto rituals. Adjacent to this exhibition, Mouangue showed "Les Lucioles" (The Fireflies) in FISSURES OF LIGHT, Diaspora: Dissonances In F Minor, a component exhibition of the Venice Biennale.

== Artistry ==
Mouangue has developed a term called the 'third aesthetic', which he describes as an in-between, collaborative space that is created when two cultures interact. The ideology derives from Mouangue's first experiences in Japan. He noticed that features of Japanese and Cameroonian culture such as animism, spirituality, and codification of symbols, were shared, and although there were also large differences, there were enough similarities to make Mouangue question ideas of identity and cultural belonging. The term 'third aesthetic' illustrates the main goal and ideological structure of his work. Mouangue dislikes attachment to rigid identities, and through his art, seeks to demonstrate a universal sense of belonging.

'Wafrica' is composed of the term wa (和, "peace" or "harmony", later coming to refer to Japan during the reign of Empress Genmei (707–715 CE)), and the word Africa. The term for Mouangue captures both his Cameroonian, Africa heritage, and his experience in Japan.

=== Kimono ===
Mouangue developed a set of kimono first in collaboration with Japanese kimono maker Kururi, and later with kimono maker Odasho. They were sourced from West African fabrics, made in the Netherlands, alongside classic Japanese features of kimono design. The garments focus on the mixing of two vivid cultures and aim to make the viewer question the rules of identity, opening them up to the idea of a global culture.

The set of kimono have since been shown at the Fesman festival in Dakar, 2010, the Museum of Art and Design in New York, the Museum der Kulturen, Basel, the Etnografiska museet, Stockholm, Tokyo, the Nishi Hongan-ji temple in Kyoto, TICAD VII, Nairobi, 2017, the Charles H.Wright Museum, in Detroit, 2018, the Maison de la Culture du Japon a Paris, and the Victoria and Albert Museum exhibition on kimono in 2020. They were also worn by actress Victoria Abril at Cannes in 2017. On 20 July 2021, Mouangue's work was featured in the BBC series "Secrets of the Museum", which showed the preparation and styling choices of the kimono, ready for its tour as part of the "Black Thread and Kimono – Kyoto to Catwalk" event, run by the V&A. In April 2022, Mouangue's Kimonos were featured in the Homo Faber exhibition in Venice, organised by the Michelangelo Foundation, and in 2023, were featured on the front cover of the Patek Philippe magazine, photographed by photographer Silvia Draz.

Later in 2023, Mouangue was involved in a talk named "Fashioning Kimono" with another fashion designer Kazu Huggler, hosted by Museum Rietberg.

=== Blood Brothers ===
Blood Brothers is a series of wooden human-like sculptures finished in traditional Japanese lacquer work. The sculptures were sourced from pygmy craftsmen in Cameroon and taken to Japan where they were finished with a lacquer coating, done by Okawara Masaru, a traditional lacquer worker. Makaru usually only takes commissions from the Japanese Emperor but agreed to help Mouangue with this one-off piece. Mouangue later presented the sculptures as a tribute to Japan following the Tsunami in 2011. Blood Brothers took two years to complete.

The Blood Brothers were exhibited at the Museum of Art and Design in New York. Mouangue was offered $420,000 by the museum for the artwork but turned down the offer. Blood Brothers have also been shown in La Galerie Paris 1839, Hong Kong, in June 2018.

=== Other works ===
==== Tea ceremony ====
Mouangue has also composed live performances to illustrate his ideas of third aesthetic and the Japanese/Cameroonian relationship. In 2009, at the French Institute in Japan, Mouangue put together a performance of a tea ceremony, accompanied by Senegalese musicians. Those acting as hosts were wearing Mouangue's kimono, and the ceremony also featured a woman posing as a participating spirit.

==== Cosmos ====
Cosmos is a set of Nigerian masks of fertility, finished by Japanese lacquer worker Nagatoshi Onishi.

==== Hanekaze ====
Hanekaze, translating to "feather wind" in English, is a collaborative piece between Mouangue, the Toyota Europe Design Development Centre and Eric Charles-Donatien. The piece is meant to represent movement and shared heritage. It was exhibited at the Maison du Japon in Paris from February 18 to March 31, 2020.

==== Golgoth I-IV ====
Another transformation of an African mask, this time from the Bambara people in Mali, Mouangue enlisted Masaru Okawara again to transform the mask with a lacquer coating. Mouangue has produced a series of these masks, each styled on different animals, but all using the same lacquer techniques.

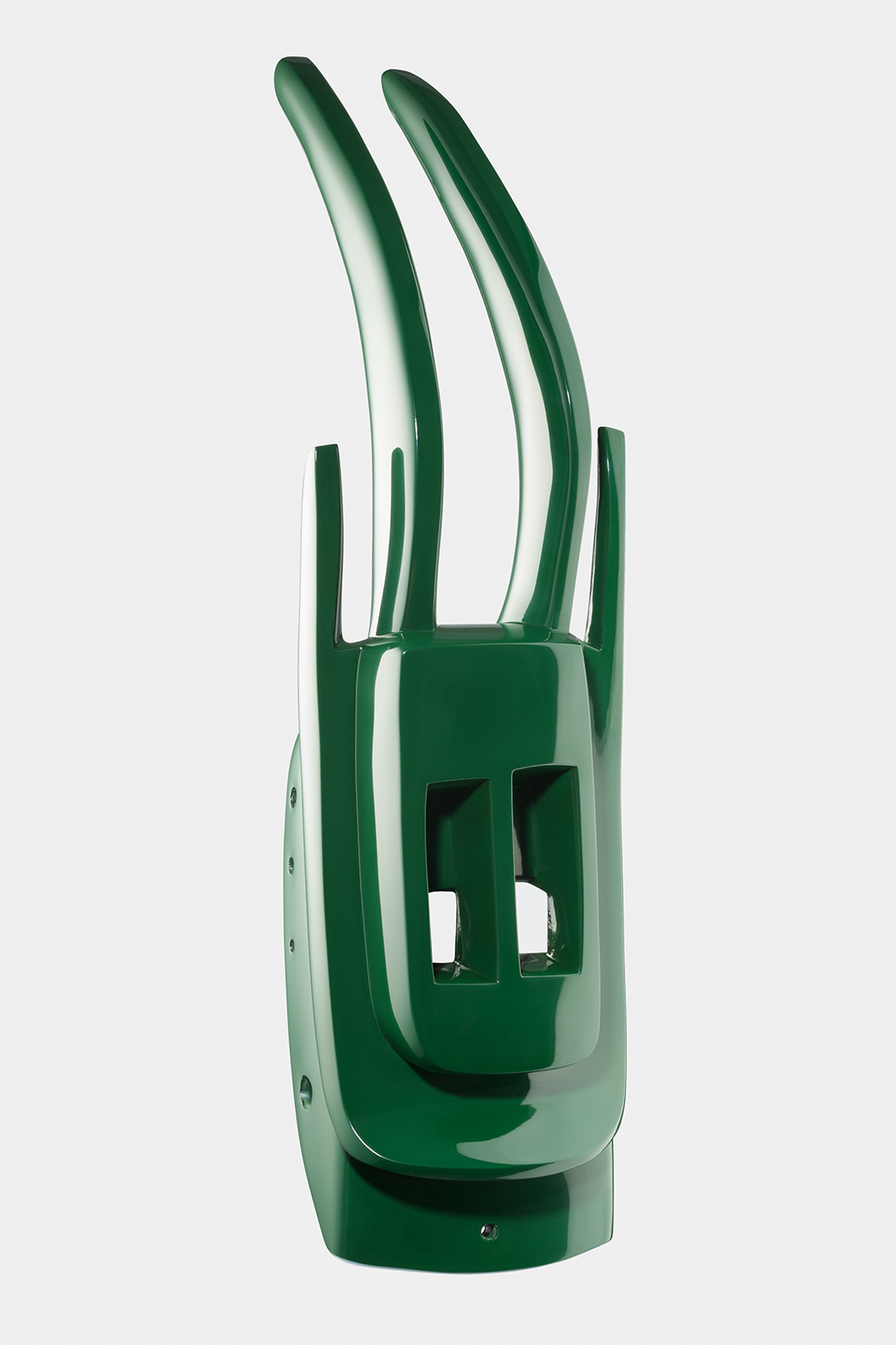
Sasa 笹 - Serge Mouangue

==== Seven Sisters ====
"Seven Sisters" is an installation displaying a group of 14 women wearing masks and robes. The masks are Punu masks from Gabon. The robes are Cameroonian, made from a Ndop textile by the Bamileke people. The installation also aims at stimulating a feeling of shared heritage. Seven sisters was featured as the main focus of interest in Mouangue's 2025 AKAA exhibition "The Third Aesthetic".

==== Fragrance ====
Mouangue is in the process of developing a fragrance which mixes botanical fragrances from African rainforests and Japanese wildflowers.

Sasa 笹

Made between 2019 and 2020, the Sasa mask, similar to the Golgoth series, is a sculpted piece of wood, coated with washi paper and finished with urushi lacquer.
