= Swedish art =

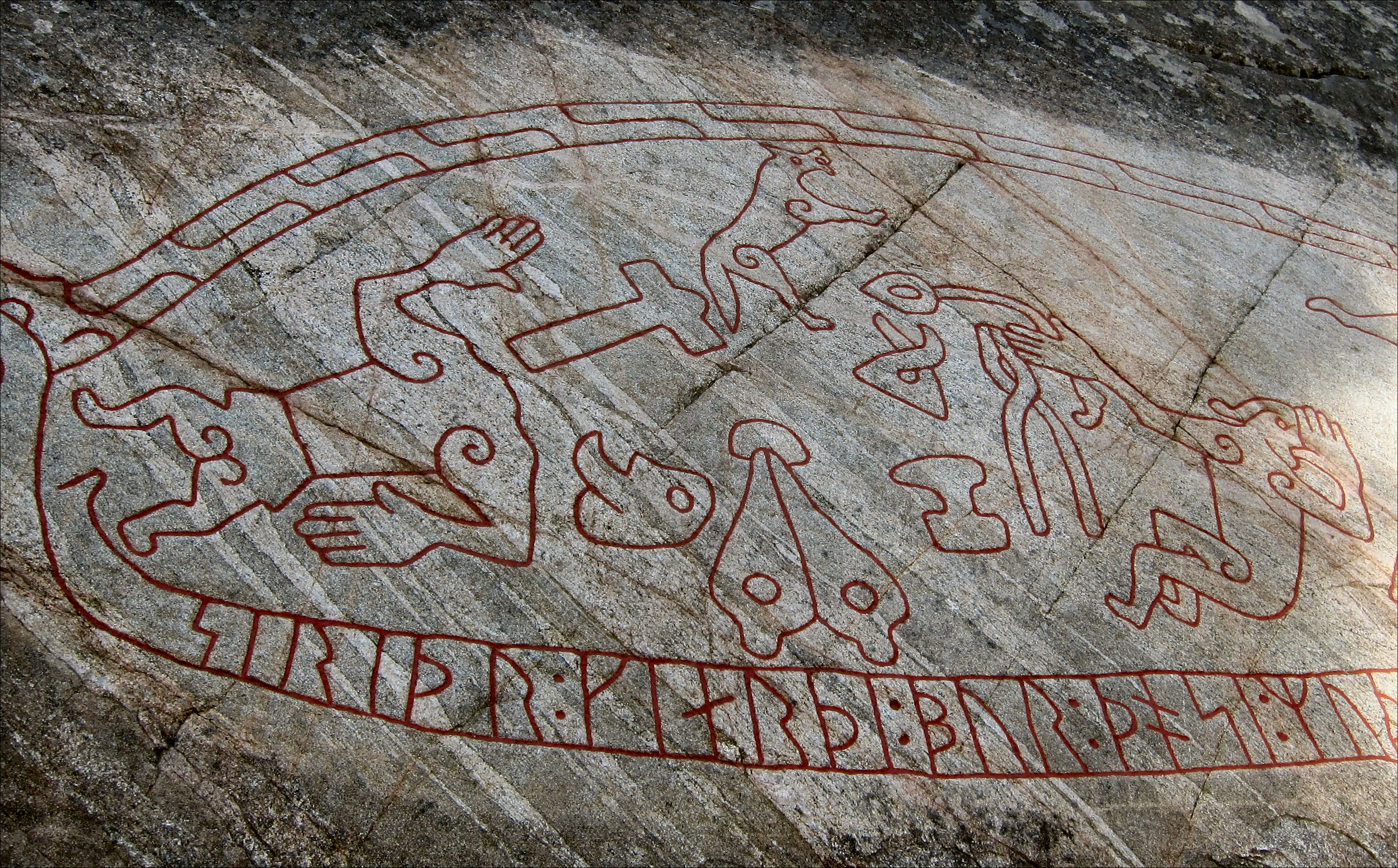
Detail of the Ramsund Sigurd stone, c. 1030

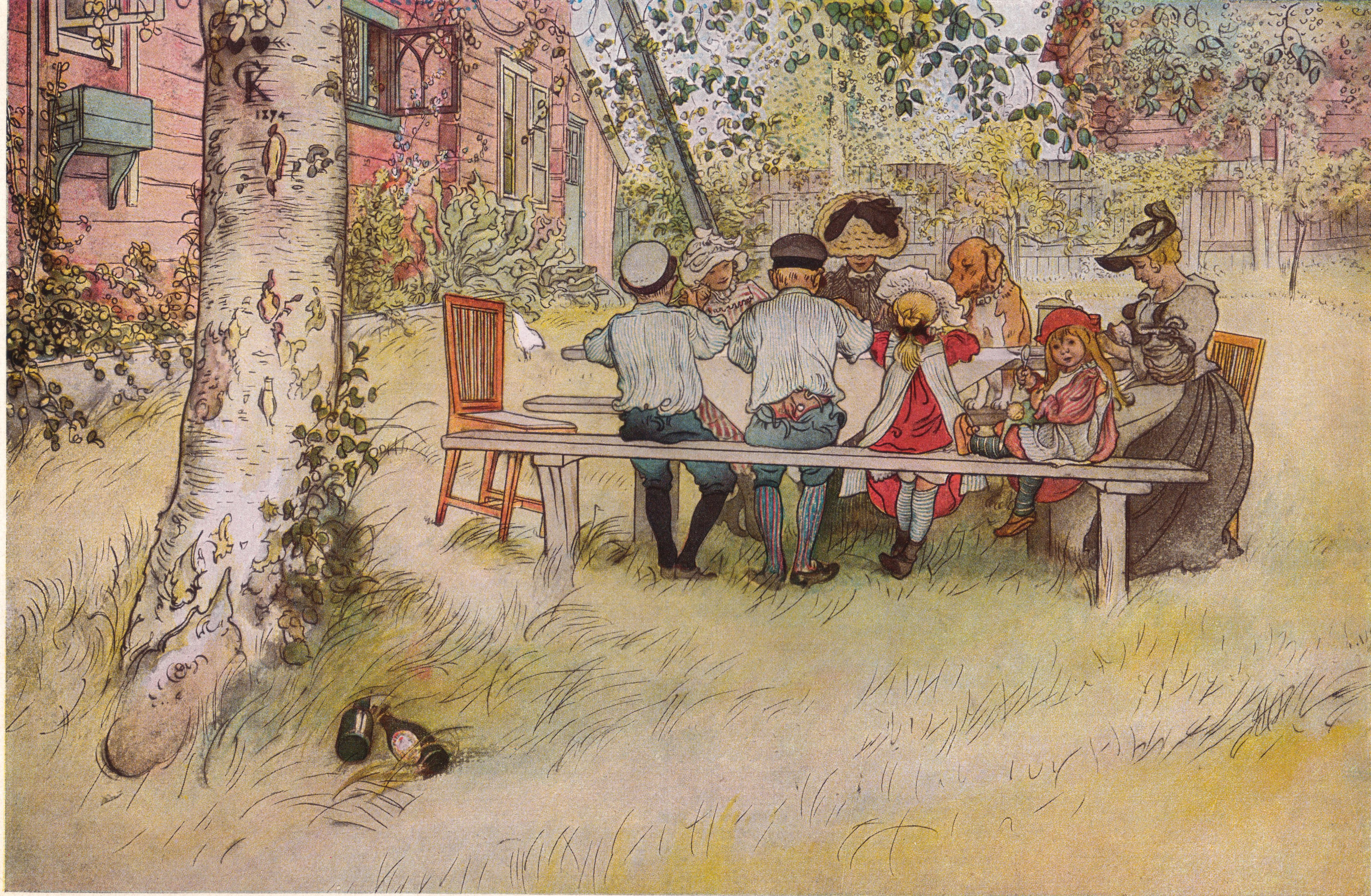
Carl Larsson's Breakfast Under the Big Birch Tree, 1896

Swedish art refers to the visual arts produced in Sweden or by Swedish artists. Sweden has existed as a country for over 1,000 years, and for times before this, as well as many subsequent periods, Swedish art is usually considered as part of the wider Nordic art of Scandinavia. It has, especially since about 1100, been strongly influenced by wider trends in European art. After World War II, the influence of the United States strengthened substantially. Due to generous art subsidies, contemporary Swedish art has a big production per capita.

Though usually not especially a major centre for art production or exporter of art, Sweden has been relatively successful in keeping its art; in particular, the relatively mild nature of the Swedish Reformation, and the lack of subsequent extensive rebuilding and redecoration of churches, has meant that with other Scandinavian countries, Sweden has had an unusually rich survival of medieval church paintings and fittings. One period when Nordic art exerted a strong influence over the rest of northern Europe was in Viking art, and there are many survivals, both in stone monuments left untouched around the countryside, and objects excavated in modern times.

The Reformation greatly disrupted Swedish artistic traditions, and left the existing body of painters and sculptors without large markets. The requirements of the court and aristocracy were mainly for portraits, usually by imported artists, and it was not until the late 17th or 18th century that large numbers of Swedes were trained in contemporary styles. The political success of the Vasa dynasty led to a considerable revival, expressed in the "Gustavan style", which again had some influence over neighbouring countries.

Among famous Swedish artists are John Bauer, Hilma af Klint, Carl Milles, Anders Zorn, Carl Larsson and Carl Eldh.

== History ==
=== Prehistoric art ===
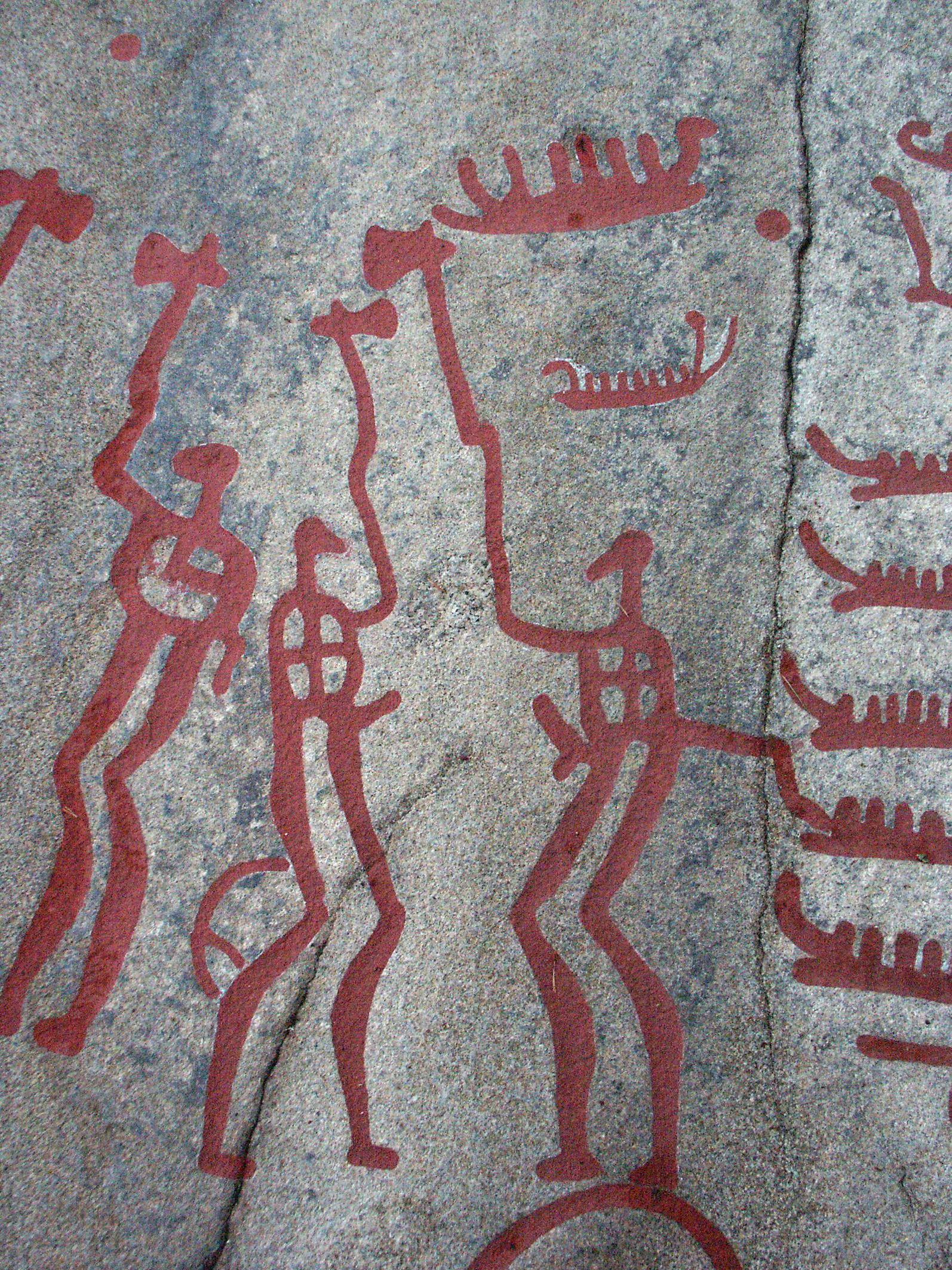
Pre-historic petroglyphs in Tanum

When the Ice Age ended, the Scandinavian peninsula was populated from the south by hunters and gatherers. Art surviving from that period are Stone Age expressions and are simple and reflect the available material. Only the truly persistent art forms have survived the ravages of time: petroglyphs are such an expression. The earliest rock carvings in the form of symbols, characters and images are carved in rock outcrops and boulders. They began to be produced about 7000 BC. Sweden has one of the largest concentrations of petroglyphs with a local center in Tanum Municipality in Bohuslän province.

During the Bronze Age, a spiral ornamentation was produced in the style that existed in Denmark. From about 400 AD, the development of the Nordic animal ornamentation, an unusually rich and imaginative style that reached its peak during the 7th century with the so-called Vendel style. Animal ornamentation experienced a renewed flourishing on the runestones. Runestones – some of which are quite illustrative and are therefore called "image blocks" – were added between about 200 AD and 1130 with a flourishing during the period 980–1100. As an art form, the runestone is specific to Nordic culture. Sweden leads the way with the highest number of runestones, with a total of 2,800 inscriptions. Approximately 85% of all the identified blocks have been in Sweden. The stones were originally painted and combined text with ornamentation and stylized characters. They can be divided into seven different styles. Some of the first known image-makers in Sweden were, in fact, rune carvers.

Sweden, especially the south of the country, also participated in Viking Age art, along with the rest of Scandinavia.

=== Medieval and Gothic art ===
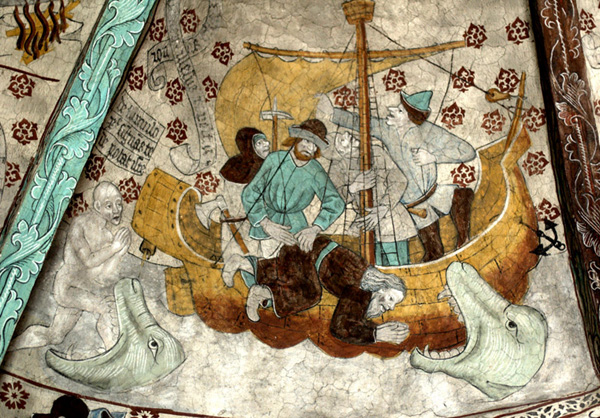
This painting by Albertus Pictor can be seen in Härkeberga Church (c. 1480).

With the advent of Christianity came a new iconography, originally established in the churches, particularly in the form of baptismal fonts, rood crosses and devotional sculptures. According to the Swedish History Museum, no other country has such a rich and comprehensive collection of medieval liturgical art. The earliest art made for the churches was Romanesque in style. It also included fabrics and gold works. From the 12th century, Gotland was a center for sculptors, such as Majestatis and Byzantios, artists known by later notnames. The Viklau Madonna, one of the most well-preserved wooden sculptures from the 12th century in Europe, was made in a workshop on Gotland which also produced rood crosses.

The Gothic style came to Sweden during the second half of the 13th century. Linköping Cathedral is built in English Gothic style and contains richly decorated sculptures. Other works from this period exhibit a French influence, for example the triumphal cross from Öja Church, Gotland and St. Erik's statue in Roslags-Bro Church in Uppland. Most of the artistic influences of the time, however, were conveyed via present-day Germany. Apart from wooden and stone sculpture, a large amount of decorative church murals survive in Sweden. These paintings, which decorated the vaults and walls of the churches, survive in large numbers notably in Scania and Uppland. Visual narratives gained momentum in the churches in central Sweden in the late 15th century by masters such as Nils Håkansson and Albertus Pictor. Motifs during this period were often religious or mythical. There are also Gothic monumental paintings on wood in Sweden. Sweden also has the largest amount of preserved medieval stained glass in the Nordic countries, the majority of which is preserved in the churches of Gotland. Contemporary with Albertus Pictor is the famous sculpture of Saint George and the Dragon in the Great Church of Stockholm. It was made by the German-born painter and sculptor Bernt Notke, one of the most influential northern European artists of the late Middle Ages. Notke, who periodically lived in Sweden, was very productive and had great influence with an intense and expressionistic style.

=== Renaissance and Baroque art ===
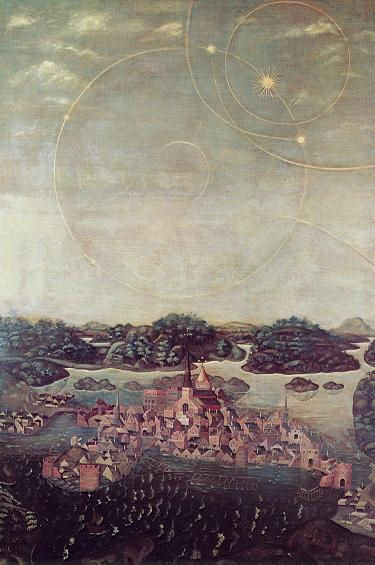
17th century copy of Urban Larsson's Vädersoltavlan, the oldest known image of Stockholm. The painting can be seen in Storkyrkan.

The Vasa period of art consisted largely of portraits of princes, which were painted by foreign artists who were active in Sweden. Urban Larsson with his Vädersoltavla from 1535, in the Great Church in Stockholm, was an exception. He is one of the few well-known Swedish artists during the Vasa period and the Renaissance era.

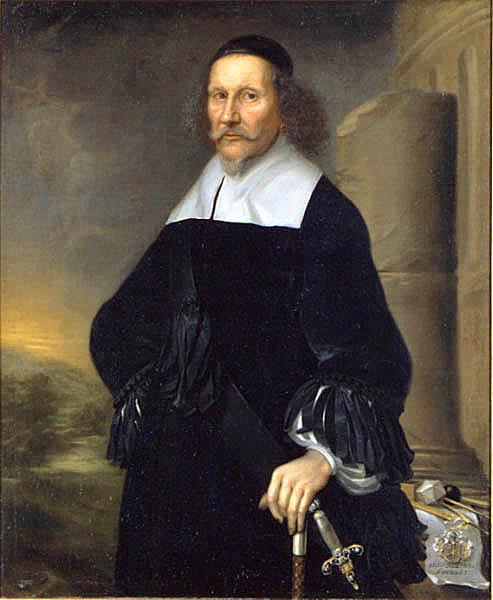
David Klöcker Ehrenstrahl painted this portrait of Georg Stiernhielm (1663)

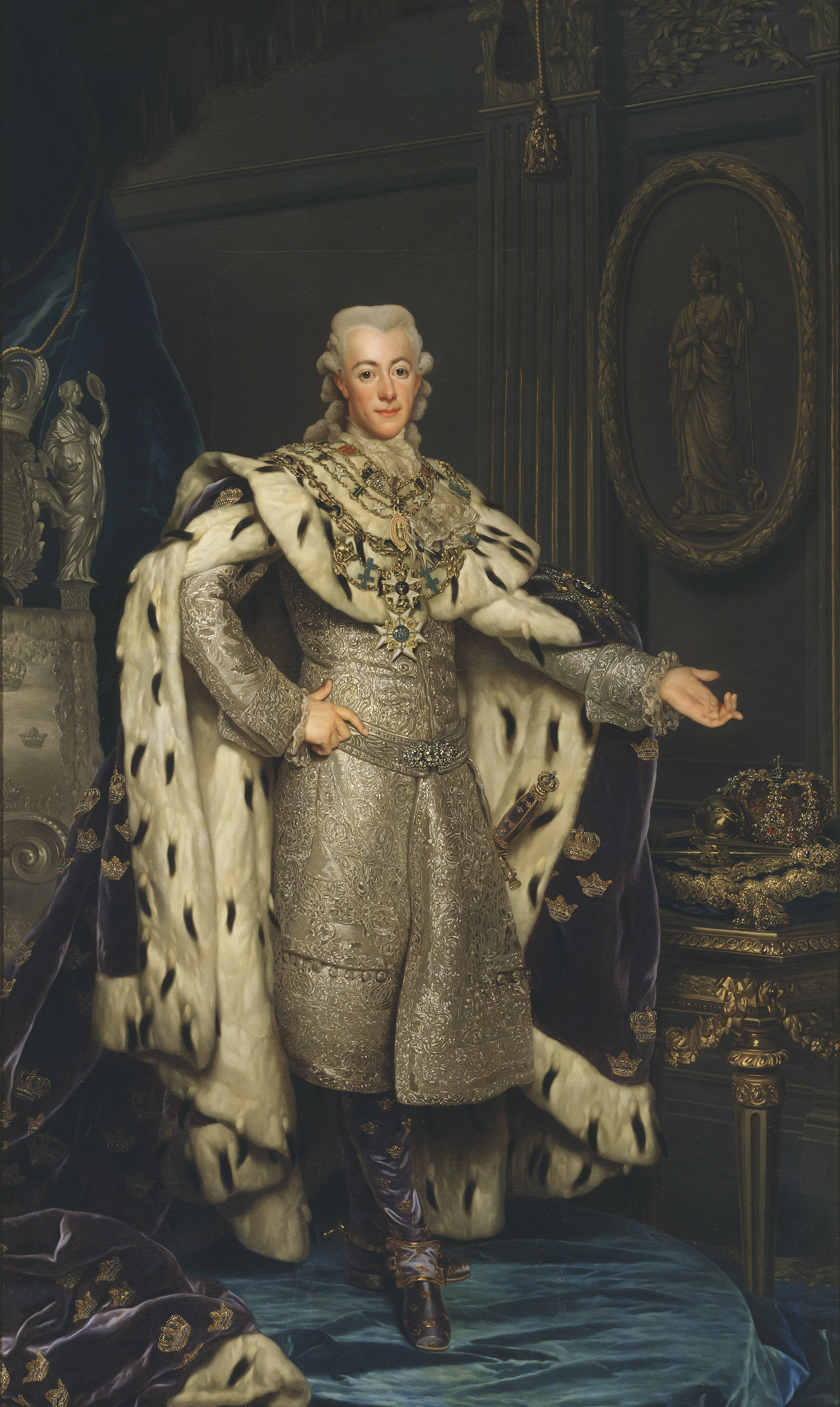
Alexander Roslin's portrait of Gustav III (1777)

The pompous, happy and decorative made its entrance in the 17th century Great Power – during the 17th and 18th centuries the first few decades – was a grand time for architecture. A number of castles, mansions and churches built, like the Royal Palace, meant that artists were called from abroad. These foreign artists trained new generations of Swedish artists. More significant art collections were acquired through spoils of war. One famous artist was the court painter David Klöcker Ehrenstrahl. Ehrenstral was also a portraitist and animal painter, and worked with the Drottningholm Palace, together with Johan Sylvius. Erik Dahlbergh depicted the superpower era of Sweden in the great work Suecia Antiqua et Hodierna. Other painters were David von Krafft, Michael Dahl.

=== Rococo and the Gustavian style ===
Liberty and the Gustavian period was a major cultural boom in Sweden. At this time, Rococo was the initial style. Future portrait paintings made it internationally known in Swedish painting. During the period, many Swedish artists moved to continental Europe. A representative of the rococo was Gustaf Lundberg. His technique was long dominant in the Swedish portrait arts, and he is represented at the Louvre and the National Museum and Art Academy. The French painter Guillaume Taraval was called upon to decorate the Royal Palace. Together with Carl Hårleman he advocated the new relaxed style. A leading style artist was Jean Eric Rehn, a student of Hårleman, who worked as craftsmen, architect and artist.

Alexander Roslin took inspiration from France and conducted many highly sensitive portraits of the era's finest personalities. Some of Roslin's portraits are among the most reproduced from the period. Of major importance was also Carl Gustaf Pilo, who became a court painter in Denmark. Pilo was inspired both by Venetian artists and the Dutchman Rembrandt van Rijn. Pilo returned, however, to Sweden and then painted the great work Gustaf III's coronation in Stockholm Cathedral.

Other prominent names were Johan Pasch, Per Krafft the Elder, Peter Adolf Hall, Pehr Hilleström and, perhaps most importantly, Johan Tobias Sergel. Over time, beginning around 1770, Rococo was succeeded in Sweden by the Gustavian period. Swedish neoclassicism is said to have begun around 1785. The Gustavian period was characterized by both French and English influence.

After Gustav III's death, there was a period of stagnation in Swedish art. On the other hand, peasant painting flourished in particular, Dalarna and Hälsingland with painting and Dala horses during this time. Peasantry painting became a major inspiration for the 18th century artist Carl Larsson. Gothicism and Neoclassicism were the styles of art for several decades, including artists like the sculptor Bengt Fogelberg. Fogelberg, who was inspired by the Danish sculptor Bertel Thorvaldsen, created powerful statues of Nordic deities and historical figures.

=== Karl Johan style ===
From the mid-19th century and a few decades later, nature paintings dominated the scene, with Marcus Larsson in the lead. Artists that pointed to something new were Egron Lundgren and Carl Fredrik Hill. Hill became one of the foremost Swedish landscape painters as he had views that reflected his personality and often express despair and darkness. Egron Lundberg developed watercolor art, as he traveled extensively in Europe and Asia, and painted his findings. Historical painting was also done extensively during the period, including artists such as Carl Gustaf Hellqvist and Gustaf Cederström. Another painter was August Malmström, who created historic and romantic nature works and illustrated many fairytales.

=== Romanticism and naturalism ===
From an international perspective Swedish-produced art languished in obscurity until the late 19th century, when a number of Swedish artists gained attention outside of Sweden. Especially the 1880s and the following two decades were periods of greatness in the Swedish art. Perhaps the best artist of them is the painter, sculptor, and printmaker Anders Zorn. Zorn was an extremely talented oil painter with a very precise but free style.

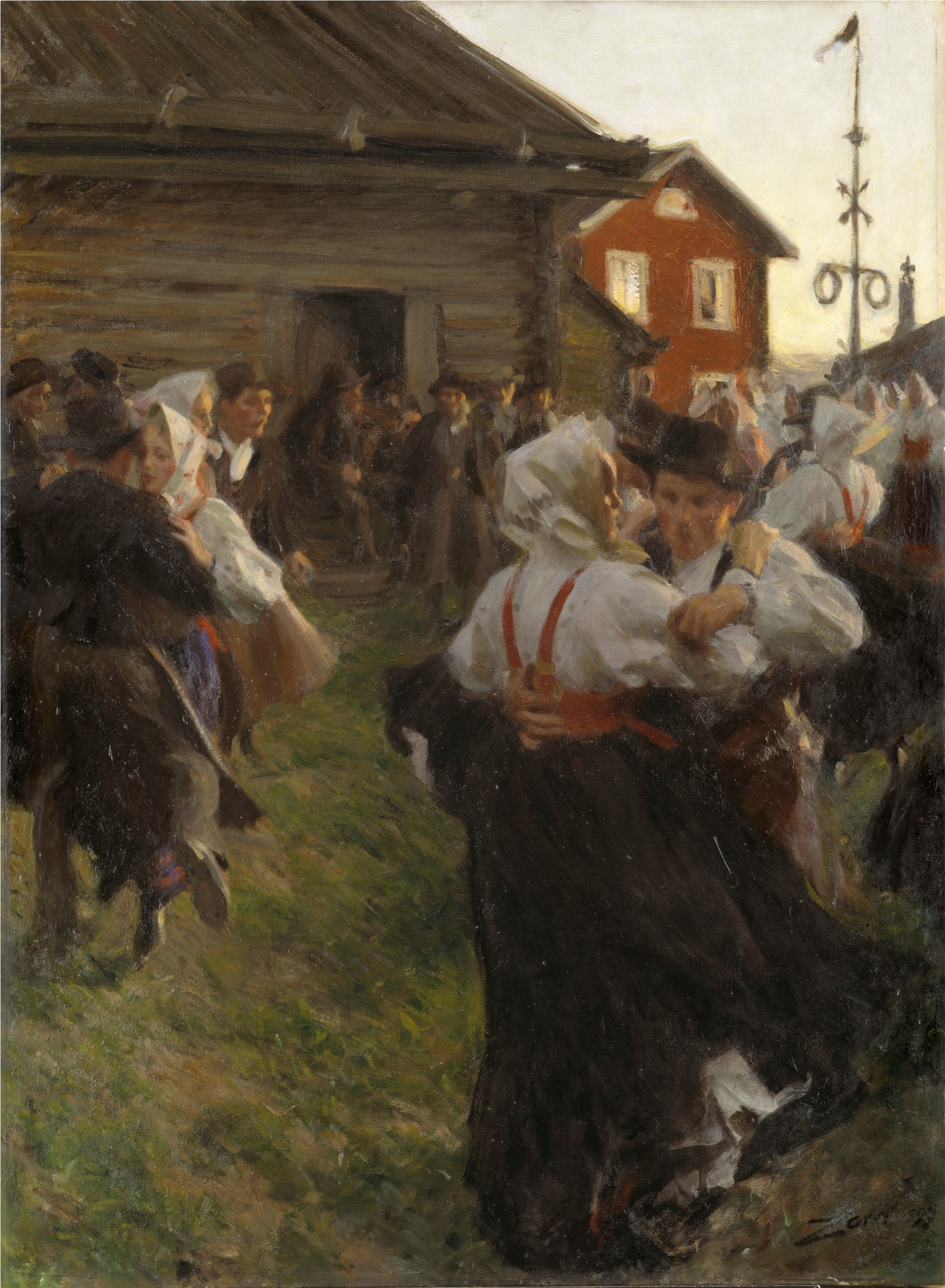
Anders Zorn's Midsummer Dance, 1897

Anders Zorn painted landscapes and people and is known for his nude studies of the hillocks from Dalarna. Zorn was also concerned with depicting peasant life in his home province of Dalarna. Amalia Lindegren also created glorified scenes of the Swedish peasant and folk. Zorn was counted as one of the foremost painters in Europe in the late 19th century and made many portraits of contemporary celebrities. Some famous work is Love's Nymph (1883), A Prime (1888), Midsummer Dance (1897), President Grover Cleveland (1899) and Bathing hills (1906). Zorn's art is featured at the Musée d'Orsay in Paris and the White House, and his works are among the most valued of all Swedish artists.

Another big name from this generation is Carl Larsson. Larsson, like Zorn, appeared in Dalarna and is one of the most beloved Swedish artists. Larsson painted primarily in watercolor and his motifs were found in daily life: he often portrayed his own family and their home in Sundborn. His style is airy, very light and is characterized by a skillful interplay of surfaces and lines. Larsson created frescoes and wall paintings, like "Midvinterblot" and several other frescoes in the Nationalmuseum in Stockholm. Larsson became very famous in Germany in connection with an art book, A Home, that was published there. Another painter who achieved great popularity was Bruno Liljefors with very precise paintings of nature and animals in motion.

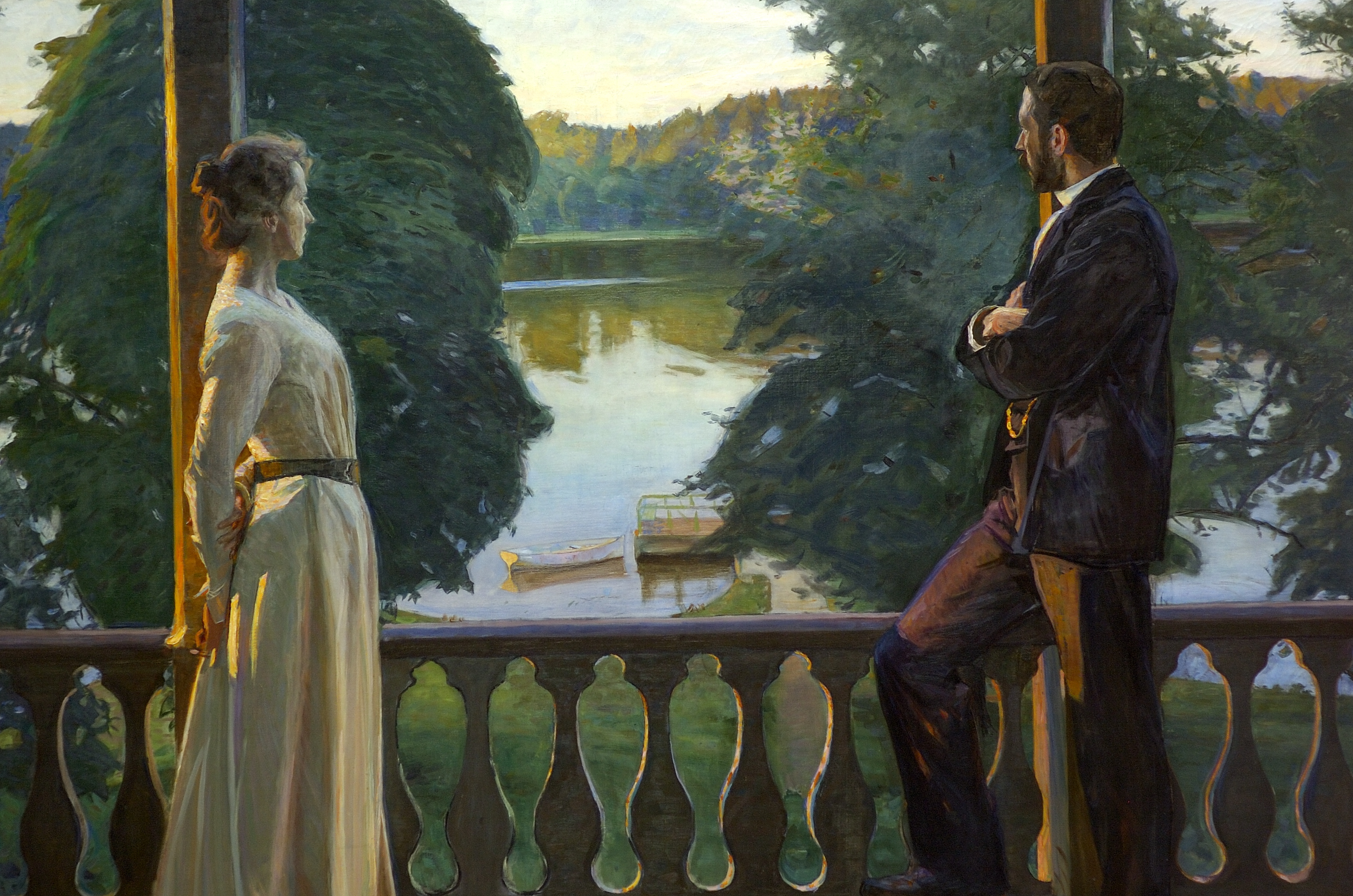
Richard Bergh's Nordic Summer Evening, 1899–1900

Two painters with great stylistic ability were Eugène Jansson and Ernst Josephson. Taking stylistic inspiration from van Gogh, Jansson's paintings are often geometrically simple large forms, tranquil Stockholm motifs as well as powerful homoerotic male figures. Josephsson is more varied and known for masterful oil portraits. He became an inspiration for the later modernism. Portrait painting was also developed by Richard Bergh as well as by Nils Kreuger. A significant development came in 1885 with the artists' group Opponenterna ('the Opponents'), who wanted to renew Swedish painting and gathered many of those names. A few years later, in the 1890s, Bergh and Kreuger founded the Varberg School together with Karl Nordström. They reacted against the realistic landscape style and were inspired by Paul Gauguin. Especially Nordström was inspired by the French impressionists. A close friend of Nordström was the author and the universal genius of August Strindberg. Even Strindberg was an important Swedish painter from the period. The rise of women artists, such as Eva Bonnier, and Hanna Pauli, who took inspiration from Rembrandt and others, also became prominent in this period.

=== Modernism and expressionism ===
Modernism began to enter Swedish art with Axel Törneman and then De unga ('the Young Ones', also known as 1909 års män, 'the Men of 1909'), which was a group of young male artists, mainly from Konstnärsförbundets skola. More abstract forms were represented by Hilma af Klint, Nils von Dardel and Gösta Adrian Nilsson.

The mid-1920s and a couple of decades following were both characterized by surrealism, the Halmstad Group, and of expressionism, which includes Gothenburg School realists Sven Erixson and Bror Hjorth, and a rigorous formalist, abstract minimalism of artists such as Olle Bærtling. Among the sculptors of the period are Carl Eldh and Carl Milles. Both have had great influence and the latter is perhaps the most famous Swedish sculptor of all time. From the same generation of sculptors came the self-taught wood sculptor and realist people portrayer Axel Petersson Döderhultarn.

After World War II, Swedish art was in somewhat of a boom and a host of artists established themselves. With a new democratic idea in 1947 that art was founded for everyone, popular movements promoting art and in the same period also launched a variety of arts organizations across the country. Among the radicals of the 1930s, such as painter Albin Amelin and graphic artist and monumental painter Torsten Billman, the work continued to bring images to the working people. Torsten Billman also reached new groups through his literary illustrations. In the 1950s expressionists emerged like Torsten Renqvist and more informal painters such as Rune Jansson (artist) and Eddie Figge.

In the early 1960s, Swedish art was revitalized by graphic artists such as Philip von Schantz and Nils G. Stenqvist.
