= World Congress of Intellectuals in Defense of Peace =

1948 international congress held in Wrocław, Poland

World Congress of Intellectuals in Defense of Peace (Światowy Kongres Intelektualistów w Obronie Pokoju)
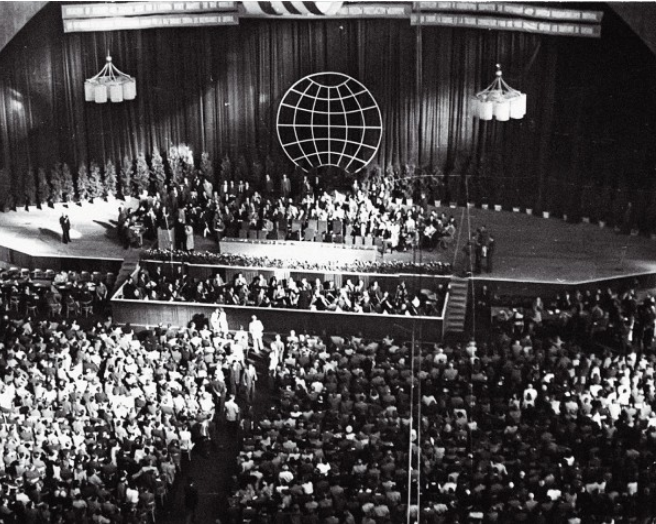
- Session of the World Congress of Intellectuals in Defense of Peace in Wrocław, 1948.
- Host country: Republic of Poland
- Date: 25 August 1948– 28 August 1948
- Venues: Wrocław University of Technology

The World Congress of Intellectuals in Defense of Peace (Polish: Światowy Kongres Intelektualistów w Obronie Pokoju) was an international conference held on 25 to 28 August 1948 at the Wrocław University of Technology. It was organized in the aftermath of the Second World War by the authorities of the Republic of Poland and the Soviet Union, and aimed against "American imperialism".

The Congress was part of Stalin's goal of slowing down the nuclear weapon program under development by the United States and its NATO allies, by influencing the world public opinion through framing of the communist members of the Eastern Bloc as supporters of world peace, and on the opposite side, portraying the Western Bloc as a threat to world peace. As early as the late 1940s, the Central Committee of the Communist Party of the Soviet Union issued decrees and orders to promote anti-American sentiments within the Soviet Republics.

== Organization ==
The Congress was officially proposed by Polish communist Jerzy Borejsza, member of the Polish Workers' Party, based in Warsaw, Republic of Poland, and conceptualized by Andrei Zhdanov, Second Secretary of the Communist Party of the Soviet Union, based in Moscow, Soviet Russia. It was held on 25 to 28 August 1948 at the Wrocław University of Technology. The number of national delegations was also determined: the most numerous was the 50-person Soviet delegation; the delegations from France, Italy, and United Kingdom were to have 35-40 people each; the Hungarian and Czechoslovak delegations were to have around 30 people; and the Romanian and Bulgarian delegations had 15 people each. It cost the organizers about 100 million Polish złoty.

The topics of the speeches and the selection of speakers were carefully planned. In addition to the lectures condemning American imperialism, a place was also found for the fight against fascism and clericalism. As early as the late 1940s, the Central Committee of the Communist Party of the Soviet Union issued decrees and orders to promote anti-American sentiments within the Soviet Republics. The plan was also for the Congress to establish a peace prize that would offset the Nobel Peace Prize.

== Program ==
The Congress was part of Stalin's goal of slowing down the nuclear weapon program under development by the United States and its NATO allies, by influencing the world public opinion through framing of the communist members of the Eastern Bloc as supporters of world peace, and on the opposite side, portraying the Western Bloc as a threat to world peace. At that time, the Soviet Union did not have nuclear weapons of its own, although it was engaged in a crash program to develop them. Polish historian Wojciech Tomasik claimed that the Congress was an example of the Soviet Union hijacking the concept of "defending peace", to justify its own policies. The aim of the Congress was to influence world public opinion, portraying the Eastern Bloc countries as supporters of world peace and the Western Bloc countries as a threat to it. Dąbrowska in her memoirs stated that "the Congress was not aimed at preventing the war in general, but at preventing an American-Soviet War from taking place now, at the moment in which the USSR is in the inferior position."

Some Polish activists and politicians initially saw the congress as a neutral event that would boost Polish relations with the West. However, in reaction to a strongly anti-American speech where the Soviet delegation leader, Russian writer Alexander Fadeyev, compared American democracy to fascism and attacked authors, academics, philosophers, and intellectuals from Western countries, such as John Dos Passos, T. S. Eliot, André Malraux, Eugene O'Neill, and Jean-Paul Sartre; some of them were reportedly offended by Fadeyev's speech. As a result, some of the non-Soviet delegates, including English biologist and philosopher Julian Huxley (then director of UNESCO), Léger, and Taylor left the conference in protest. Huxley accused the Congress of intolerance towards non-communist viewpoints, and stated that "such behaviour cannot lead to peace, and may help to promote war". Russian writer Ilya Ehrenburg then gave a conciliatory speech on behalf of the Soviet delegation, and Borejsza convinced almost everyone to remain at the Congress.

A number of other speeches shared much of the anti-American rhetoric proposed by the Soviet delegation. French journalist François Bondy noted that the Soviet delegation was particularly unfriendly and aggressive towards many of the Western delegates, and their actions sowed much discord into the conference, ruining the attempts by Polish delegates to salvage the neutral tone of the event. The final act of the conference was a resolution to defend world peace. The resolution applauded democracy while criticizing the national governments of the United States and United Kingdom, arguing that a small group of greed-motivated individuals in North America and Western Europe "inherited" the evils of fascism, and they are allegedly planning a coup d'état against world peace. Only 11 delegates voted against (7 out of 32 from the US, and 4 out of 32 from the UK). Another source notes that 371 out of 391 delegates voted in support.

Simultaneously with the Congress, another event occurred in Wrocław: the Exhibition of the Regained Territories, another international event, this one used by the Poles to explain the territorial changes of Poland after World War II and the securing of the so-called "Regained Territories". Together, the Conference and the Exhibition aimed to convince the world that the border change was beneficial to Europe and the world peace. The Congress elected a permanent International Committee of Intellectuals in Defence of Peace (also known as the International Committee of Intellectuals for Peace and the International Liaison Committee of Intellectuals for Peace), with headquarters in Paris, France. The Congress called for the establishment of national branches and the holding of national meetings similar to its own. In accordance with this policy, a Cultural and Scientific Conference for World Peace was held in New York City, United States in March 1949.

== Delegates ==
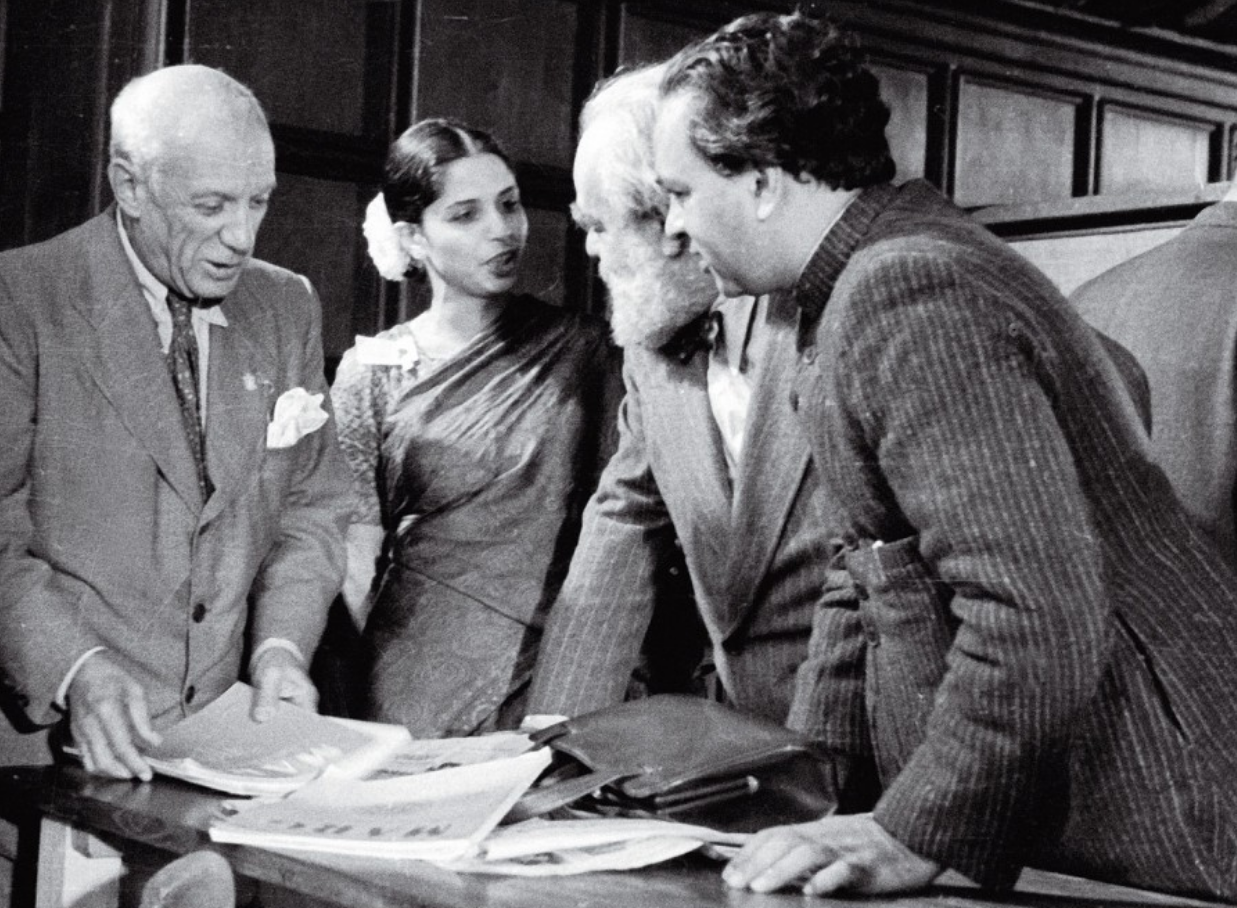
From left to right: Pablo Picasso, Minnette de Silva, Jo Davidson, and Mulk Raj Anand attending the World Congress of Intellectuals in Defense of Peace

A large number of notable individuals, primarily supportive of left-wing and progressive policies, participated to the conference. They included:

- George Abbe
- Alexander Abusch
- Kazimierz Ajdukiewicz
- Sibilla Aleramo
- Jorge Amado
- Albin Amelin
- Mulk Raj Anand
- Martin Andersen Nexø
- Ivo Andrić
- Louis Aragon
- Ewa Bandrowska-Turska
- Umberto Barbaro
- Jean-Louis Barrault
- Julien Benda
- J. D. Bernal
- Erik Blomberg
- John Boyd Orr
- Bertolt Brecht
- Władysław Broniewski
- Jean Bruller
- Giorgio Caproni
- Aimé Césaire
- Józef Chałasiński
- Le Corbusier
- Norman Corwin
- Eugénie Cotton
- Edward Crankshaw
- James Crowther
- Jan Czekanowski
- Maria Dąbrowska
- Jo Davidson
- Jan Dembowski
- Dominique Desanti
- Xawery Dunikowski
- Clifford Durr
- Virginia Foster Durr
- Ilya Ehrenburg
- Hanns Eisler
- Paul Éluard
- Alexander Fadeyev
- Howard Fast
- Ernst Fischer
- Grzegorz Fitelberg
- Max Frisch
- Louis Golding
- Graham Greene
- William Gropper
- Renato Guttuso
- J. B. S. Haldane
- Ludwik Hirszfeld
- Aldous Huxley
- Julian Huxley
- Jarosław Iwaszkiewicz
- Hewlett Johnson
- Frédéric Joliot-Curie
- Irène Joliot-Curie
- Albert E. Kahn
- Freda Kirchwey
- Oleksandr Korniychuk
- Tadeusz Kotarbiński
- Leon Kruczkowski
- Julian Krzyżanowski
- Fernand Léger
- Leonid Leonov
- Jack Lindsay
- Stanisław Lorentz
- Berthold Lubetkin
- György Lukács
- André Mandouze
- Kingsley Martin
- Hans Mayer
- Leopoldo Méndez
- Edita Morris
- Ira Victor Morris
- Léon Moussinac
- Zofia Nałkowska
- Otto Nathan
- Pablo Neruda
- Hans Jacob Nilsen
- Stanisław Ossowski
- Aleksandr Palladin
- Aubrey Pankey
- Andrzej Panufnik
- Jan Parandowski
- Max Pechstein
- Pablo Picasso
- Oleg Pisarzhevsky (ru)
- Salvatore Quasimodo
- Albert Rakoto Ratsimamanga
- Eberhard Rebling
- Alves Redol
- Madeleine Renaud
- James Maude Richards
- O. John Rogge
- Anna Seghers
- Harlow Shapley
- Mikhail Sholokhov
- Wacław Sierpiński
- Minnette de Silva
- Antoni Słonimski
- Olaf Stapledon
- Hugo Steinhaus
- Donald Ogden Stewart
- Marika Stiernstedt
- Franciszek Strynkiewicz
- Wojciech Świętosławski
- Yevgeny Tarle
- Władysław Tatarkiewicz
- Rafał Taubenschlag
- A. J. P. Taylor
- Lê Văn Thiêm
- Feliks Topolski
- Mirzo Tursunzoda
- Julian Tuwim
- Roger Vailland
- Karl Vennberg
- Samad Vurgun
- Jean Wahl
- Colston Warne
- Ella Winter
- Friedrich Wolf
- Kazimierz Wyka
- David Zaslavsky
- Jerzy Zawieyski

Albert Einstein did not attend the conference but sent a letter which was read to the delegates, although only after it had been censored to remove the call for a world government that would safeguard the uses of nuclear energy. Henry A. Wallace, former Vice President of the United States under Franklin D. Roosevelt and the Progressive Party's candidate in the 1948 U.S. presidential election, also sent a message of support. Overall, the Congress was attended by about 600 individuals from 46 countries. Julia Pirotte, a photojournalist known for her work in the French Resistance, covered the event.

== Aftermath ==
The conference was one of the precursors to the Soviet-dominated World Peace Council organization, which for decades would attempt to influence the world's peace movement to support a more pro-Soviet and anti-American stance.

== See also ==
- Allied-occupied Germany
  - Allied Control Council (1945–1955)
  - Soviet blockade of Berlin (1948–1949)
- American imperialism
- Communist Party USA
- Jewish Anti-Fascist Committee
- List of anti-war organizations
- List of peace activists
- Lviv Anti-Fascist Congress of Cultural Workers
- Poland–Soviet Union relations
- Post–World War II anti-fascism
- Soviet imperialism
- Timeline of the Cold War
  - Cold War (1947–1948)
  - Cold War (1948–1953)
- Warsaw Pact
- World Committee Against War and Fascism
