= Anglosaksy =

Racialist term used to describe the Anglosphere

Anglosaksy (Russian: англосаксы, lit. '"Anglo-Saxons"') is a disparaging term used especially in Russian propaganda to describe the Anglosphere, especially the United Kingdom and the United States. It picks up on earlier French usage: Les Anglo-Saxons was used similarly in French in the 19th century, when France was in competition with English-speaking colonial powers in Latin America.

== Meaning ==
The term Anglo-Saxons historically refers to Germanic tribes who settled in Great Britain in the 5th century. In modern Russian political discourse, the so-called "Anglo-Saxons" stand in civilizational opposition to the Eurasian Russian world and hold irreconcilable differences. Russian political scientist in exile Vladimir Pastukhov has described the "Anglo-Saxons" as occupying a "mythical" quality in the mind of Kremlin ideologues. The United Kingdom and United States are especially referred to by the term because they are perceived as "particularly die-hard adversaries of Russia." In pro-Kremlin media, the term is synonymously used with "Anglo-Zionists", "globalists", and "shadow rulers".

Since the Russian invasion of Ukraine, the supposed struggle of Russia against "Anglo-Saxons" has especially become a central theme of Russian propaganda. Russian President Vladimir Putin's press secretary Dmitry Peskov and Ministry of Foreign Affairs spokeswoman Maria Zakharova are among the most prolific users of the term.

"Anglo-Saxons" is similar to, though not synonymous with, the Russian propaganda phrase "the collective West". "Anglo-Saxons" also has implications that the Western world opposed to the Putin regime is not completely united, and that the English-speaking countries are not connected much to Europe.

The term "Anglo-Saxon" has been used in French since the 19th century. Its earliest appearances in print were in the Revue des races latines and it has consistently been associated with racializing essentialism, for example in the writings of Jules Verne and Georges Bernanos. It was first added to the second edition of the Littré, published after the end of the Franco-Prussian War. Its modern use, influenced by the term's use by writers ranging from Edmond Demolins to Charles Maurras, indicates a marked difference from a purportedly French (or Latin) approach to questions (especially social and economic ones).

== Reactions ==
Lynne M. Tracy, former American ambassador to Russia, has publicly spoken against use of the phrase, calling it "very strange". She said that "it does not at all reflect the essence of the United States, which is a multinational country where people from all over the world live."

== See also ==
- Anti-English sentiment
- Anglo
- Anglo-Saxonism
- Anti-American sentiment in Russia
- Gayrope
- Pindos (slur)
- Russia–United Kingdom relations
- White Anglo-Saxon Protestants
