= Mjellby Art Museum =

Art museum in Halmstad, Sweden

Coordinates: 56°40′42″N 12°46′15″E

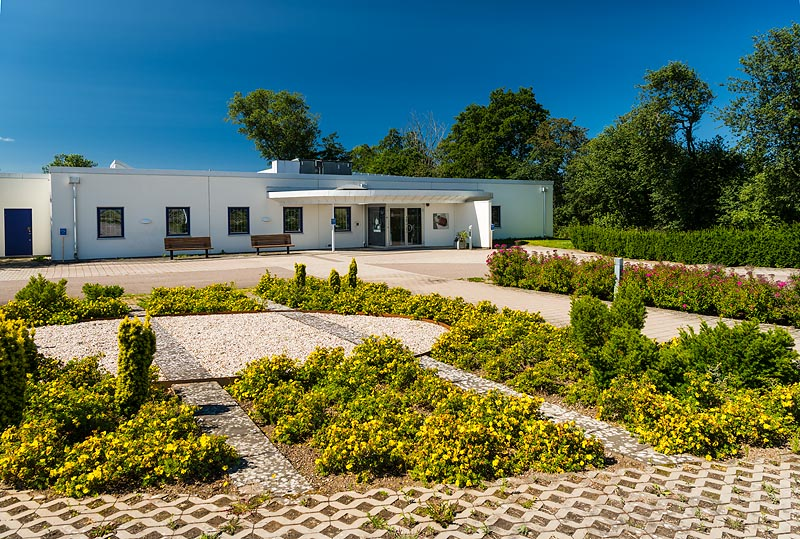
Mjellby Art Museum

Mjellby Art Museum (Mjellby konstmuseum) is situated outside Halmstad, Sweden. There is an art gallery featuring exhibitions of diverse content – everything from 1900s modernists to current contemporary art.

Mjellby Art Museum, also known as the Halmstadgruppen's museum, was established by the members of the Halmstadgruppen, whose work is often presented here in new formations. Here is a large permanent collection of the group's art. The museum's art gallery shows annually four to five exhibitions of everything from contemporary art to modernism. The museum was founded in 1980 by Swedish art critic and museum director Viveka Bosson. She was the daughter of Erik Olson, one of the members in Halmstadgruppen. Bosson bought the former site of the Mjellby folkskola (elementary school) outside Halmstad in 1980, setting up Mjellby Art Museum and later donated it to the Halmstad Municipality.

== Other sources ==
- Jan Torsten Ahlstrand; Viveka Bosson (2009) Halmstadgruppen, ett kraftfält i svensk 1900-talskonst (Stiftelsen Halmstadgruppen) ISBN 9789163346422
- Palmsköld, Hugo Halmstadgruppen (Häftad bok Fogtdal) ISBN 9188482200
