= Pindos (slur) =

Russian derogatory term for Americans

Pindos or Pendos (Russian: Пиндос) is a derogatory term used primarily in Russia and some other Eastern-European and Post-Soviet states in reference to Americans. Accordingly, the United States is referred to as Pindosia (Пиндосия) or Pindostan (Пиндостан). Originally, the term was reserved for Greek immigrants in Russian Empire.

== History ==
During the Greek War of Independence, a lot of Greeks were fleeing to Russia to escape the instability or Ottoman occupation and settled mostly along the Black and Azov Sea coasts, which led to people living there developing stereotypes about them. The term appeared in mid 19th century in south-western regions of Russia or what is now Ukraine, where locals used it to taunt or demean Greek immigrants and their descendants. Documented usages of the word can be seen in localized Russian and Ukrainian anecdotes, folk songs and poems of the time, including authors like Ivan Kotliarevsky and Aleksandr I. Kuprin. By the time of Russian Revolution the term began to fade away, and became obsolete after deportations of Greek diasporas.

The term began to reemerge after the Dissolution of the Soviet Union and the end of Yugoslav wars. It's alleged that Russian soldiers stationed in Kosovo heard local Serbs using it for UN peacekeeper forces, which were mostly American. Gradually, the term gained popularity in political discussions on Russian internet, and became wide-spread following sanctions after the 2014 Russian annexation of Crimea, this time referring exclusively to Americans.

== Etymology ==
The name for the term comes from a Greek toponym of Pindus mountain range in Northern Greece, and doesn't have a specific meaning or translation. The reason behind it's adaptation is likely a remote phonetic similarity to some common Slavic profanities, which makes it sound more derogatory. Another possibility is a shared ending with different derogatory ethnonym for American nationals: Amerikos (Америкос).

According to Andrey Piontkovsky, "Eternal Pindos—is our Wandering Jew. We need him not as an enemy defeated, trampled and lowered but as heavily armed guy in a pith helmet who dismembers our core Eurasian world, steals our unique nanotechnology and corrupts our highest spirituality."

== See Also ==
- Anti-American sentiment
- Anti-American sentiment in Russia
- List of ethnic slurs
- Yankee
