= Erik Olson =

Swedish artist (1901–1986)

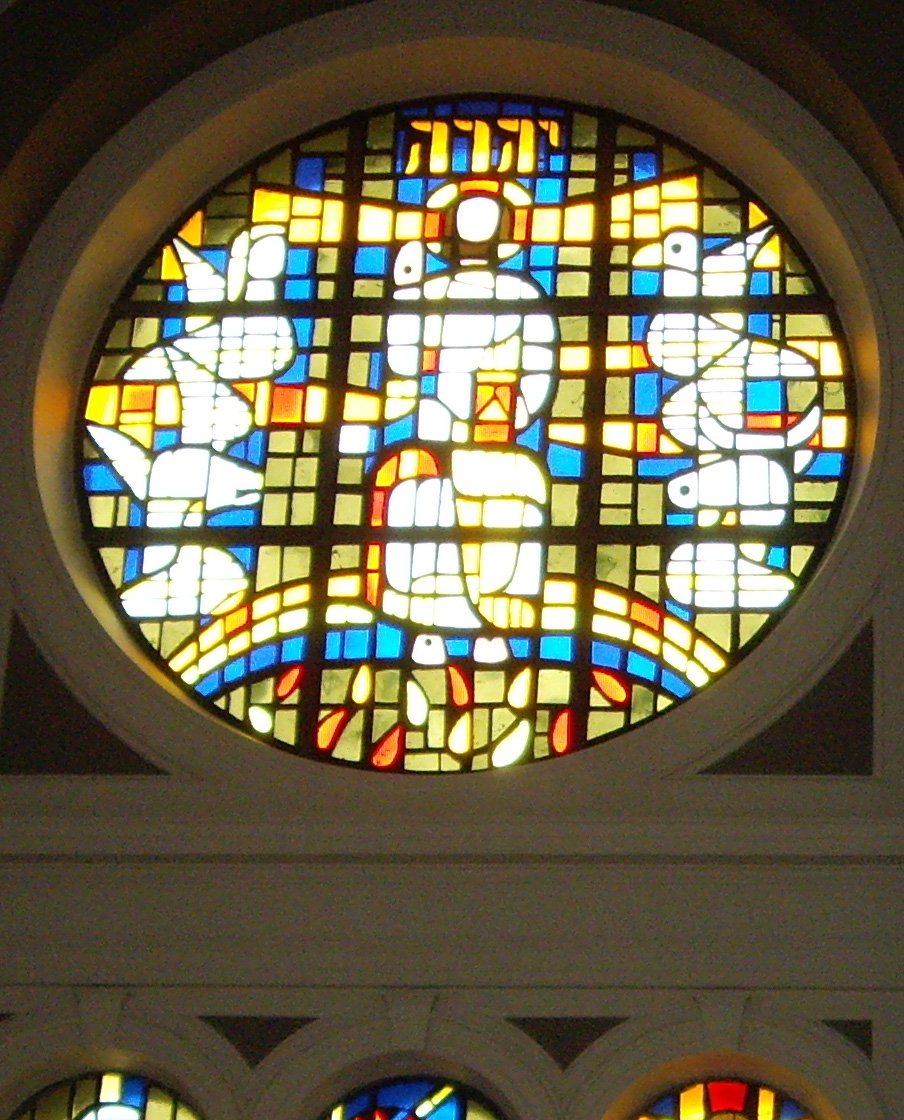
St. Clement's Church in Laholm - Korfönster with God's name YHWH in Hebrew at the top

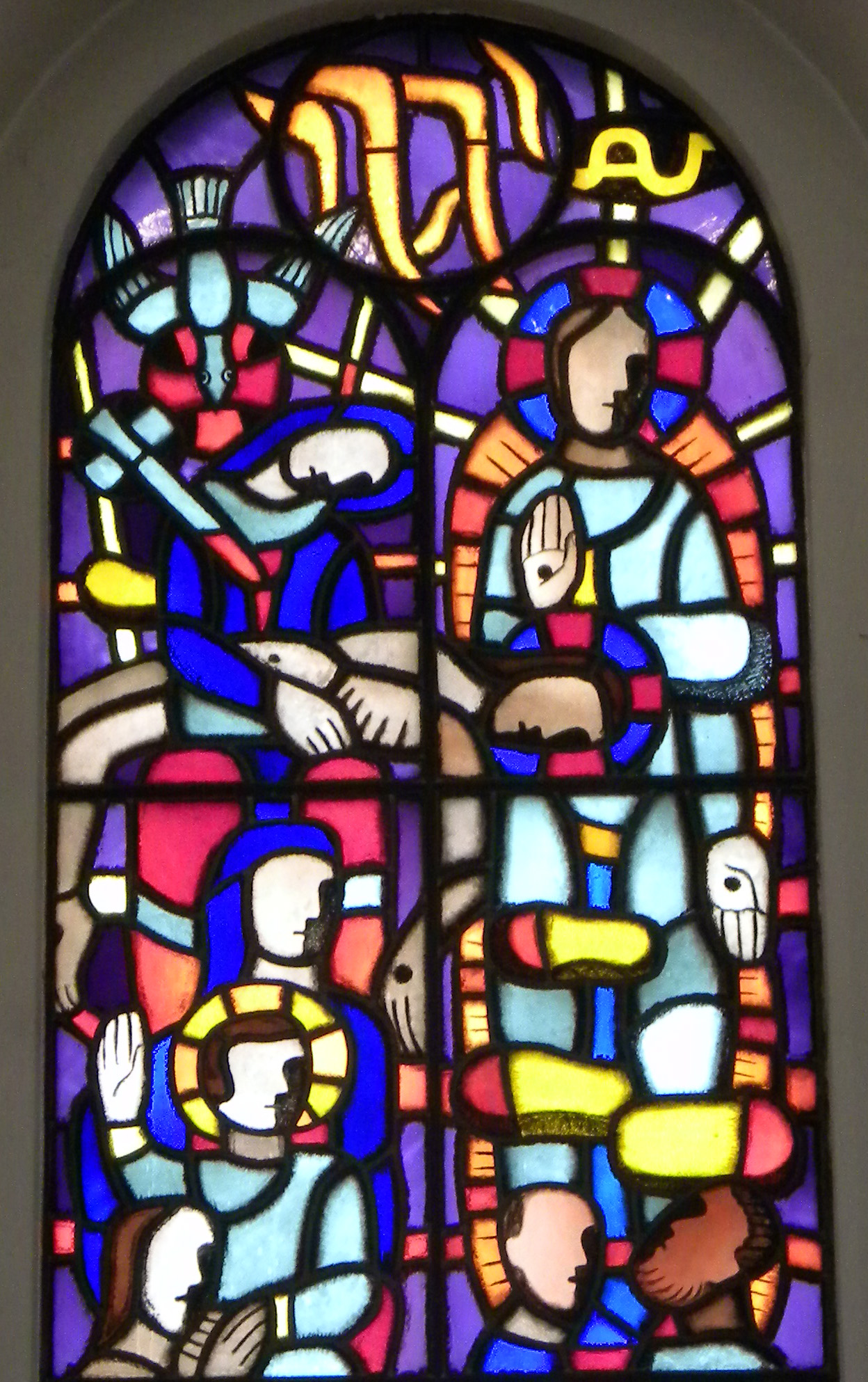
Black stain with tetra program YHWH in an upper circular medallion Husie church, Malmo

Erik Artur Olson (Ohlson, Olsson) (Halmstad 9 May 1901 – 1986) was a Swedish painter, illustrator, graphic artist, sculptor, theater decorator, and member of Halmstadgruppen. He was the brother of artist Axel Olson, and in 1929 married Solvig Sven-Nilsson. Olson is represented, for example, at the National Museum and the Museum of Modern Art. Olson is known as a Swedish surrealist. He devoted himself to dream-like, over realistic artwork.

Olson grew up in Halmstad. After school he started to work as a company copier. In the evenings he cultivated his main interest, drawing and painting, by studying at Halmstad Technical School. His father had hoped for the son to be an engineer, but Olson, as well as the two year older brother Axel Olson and cousin Waldemar Lorentzon, participated in 1919 in an amateur show in Halmstad secondary school. In the summer of 1919, they met the established artist Gosta Adrian-Nilsson (GAN). This meeting influenced them strongly, impressed by his painting and his art theories.

In 1924 Olson went to Paris together with Waldemar Lorentzon. They became students of Fernand Léger's painting academy Academie Moderne and the school spirit of cubism. Between December 1924 and March 1925 Eric Olson went to Italy for further studies. After his military service, he returned to Paris in 1927 and started working for Léger. In 1929 he married painter Solvig Sven-Nilsson. The same year he became a co-founder of Halmstadgruppen. Late in the year 1930, he painted 'Handsken är kastad', (gloves are off), which is considered to be his first surrealist work.

Olson lived for periods in both France and Denmark. Starting in the 1930s, his works participated at exhibitions in, for example, Copenhagen, London, Paris and New York. He mostly spent his summers on the coast of Halland where he participated in Söndrumskolonin during the 1940s. In 1950 Olson converted to Catholicism and spent some of his later years rediscovering religious art.

He also created several stained glass windows for various churches. One example is the stained glass in the choir in Sofia Albertina church in Landskrona and the windows of the St Maria catholic church in Halmstad. In 1971 he was awarded the Prince Eugen Medal.
