= Gayrope =

Russian homophobic slur

Gayrope (Russian: Гейропа, romanized: Geyropa, portmanteau of "gay" and "Europe") is a derogatory term used in Russia (including Russian state-owned media) and occasionally in other post-Soviet states, referencing European civilization (as a part of wider Western civilization) as opposed to the more conservative Russian civilization. Initially, it only referenced Europe as a place where LGBT is dominating (which was seen in a negative context, given that Russia is one of the most LGBT-unfriendly nations in the world), but later it grew to mean the decay of European civilization in general, while Russia keeps traditional values.

== History ==
In the early 2000s, Russia–European Union relations were full of optimism, but after a sequence of colour revolutions in post-Soviet states (the Orange Revolution in Ukraine, the Rose Revolution in Georgia and the Tulip Revolution in Kyrgyzstan), those relations started to deteriorate. According to the political scientist Andrew Foxall, this decline started during the second term of Vladimir Putin in the presidential office (2004—2008) and significantly strengthened during his third term (2012—2018). In the 2010s the perception of enmity between the two civilizations strengthened, and promoting freedom of homosexuality in Russia by the West was seen as symbol of western cultural imperialism and one of the aspects of this confrontation.

The word "Gayrope" became popular during the Euromaidan/Revolution of Dignity in Ukraine in 2013—2014 and the subsequent Russo-Ukrainian War, and it was widely used in both Russia and Ukraine. In 2016 this word was added to the "Russian etymological dictionary" edited by Oleksandr Anikin, with a tag that this is a "pejorative vulgar neologism".

== Political meaning ==
According to sociology scientist Tatiana Riabova, Russian anti-Western sentiment presents Europe as decaying, with one of the explanations for this being the alleged "distortion of natural gender roles". Negative attitudes toward Europe serve as a basis for Russian national identity, and not only exalt Russia for its inhabitants, but also give it a role of the messiah, the stronghold of traditional family values, destined to "save" Europe and the whole world.

Riabova also states that the concept of "Gayrope" is an important part of legitimizing the current political regime in Russia, allowing the government to pose itself as keepers of "normality". The forced picture of Russian political opposition as traitors of the state is supplemented by a picture of them as gender deviants. The creative class is depicted as having perverted values, and their political activity as illegitimate and not worthy of attention.

According to the gender sociologist Tamara Martsenyuk, the usage of this word in Ukraine is a good example of the persistence of homophobia in the country.

== See also ==
- Anglosaksy
- European values
- Western culture
- LGBT rights in Russia
- HIV/AIDS in Russia
- Dedovshchina
- Anti-Western sentiment § Russia
