= Wiwen Nilsson =

Swedish silversmith and jeweller

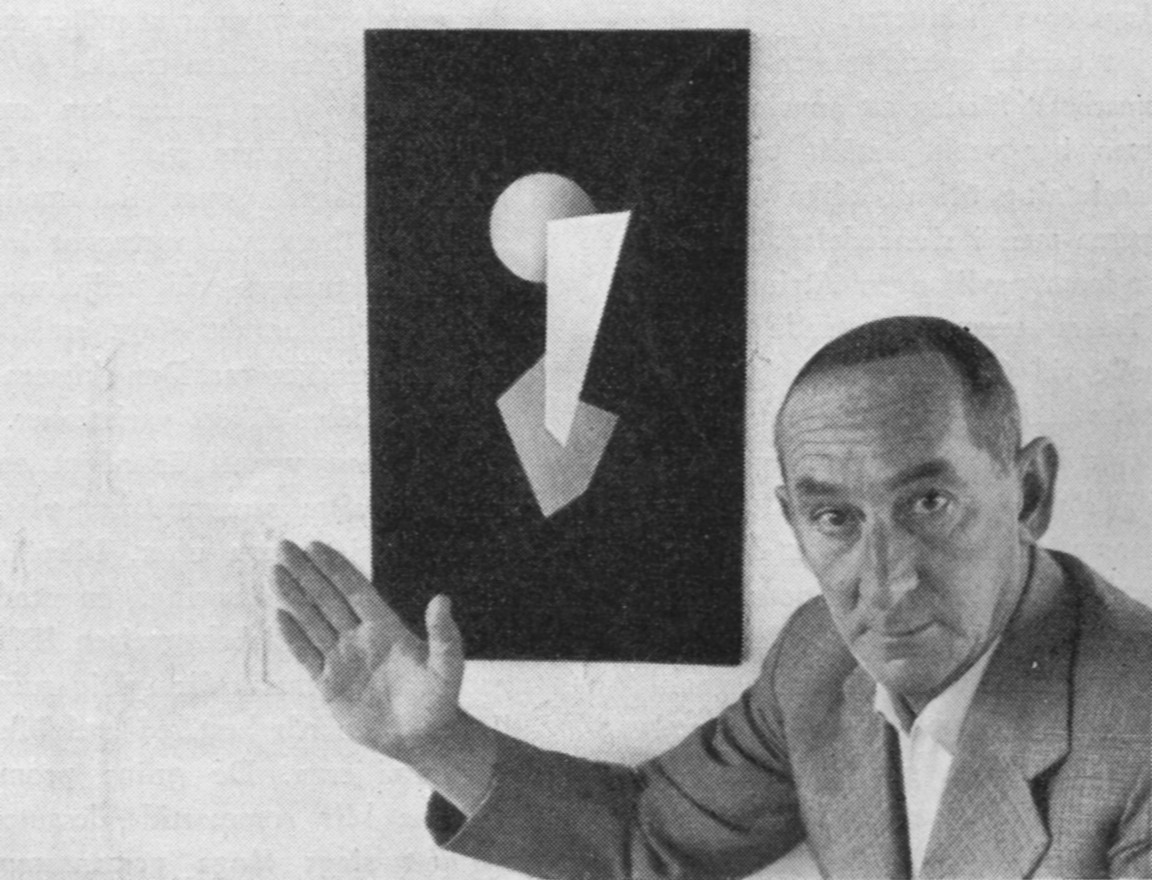
- Nilsson in the 1950s
- Born: Karl Edvin Nilsson; May 19, 1897; Copenhagen, Denmark
- Died: January 8, 1974 (aged 76); Lund, Sweden
- Resting place: Norra kyrkogården, Lund, Sweden
- Known for: Silverware, sculpture, jewellery
- Style: Modernism
- Website: wiwennilsson.org

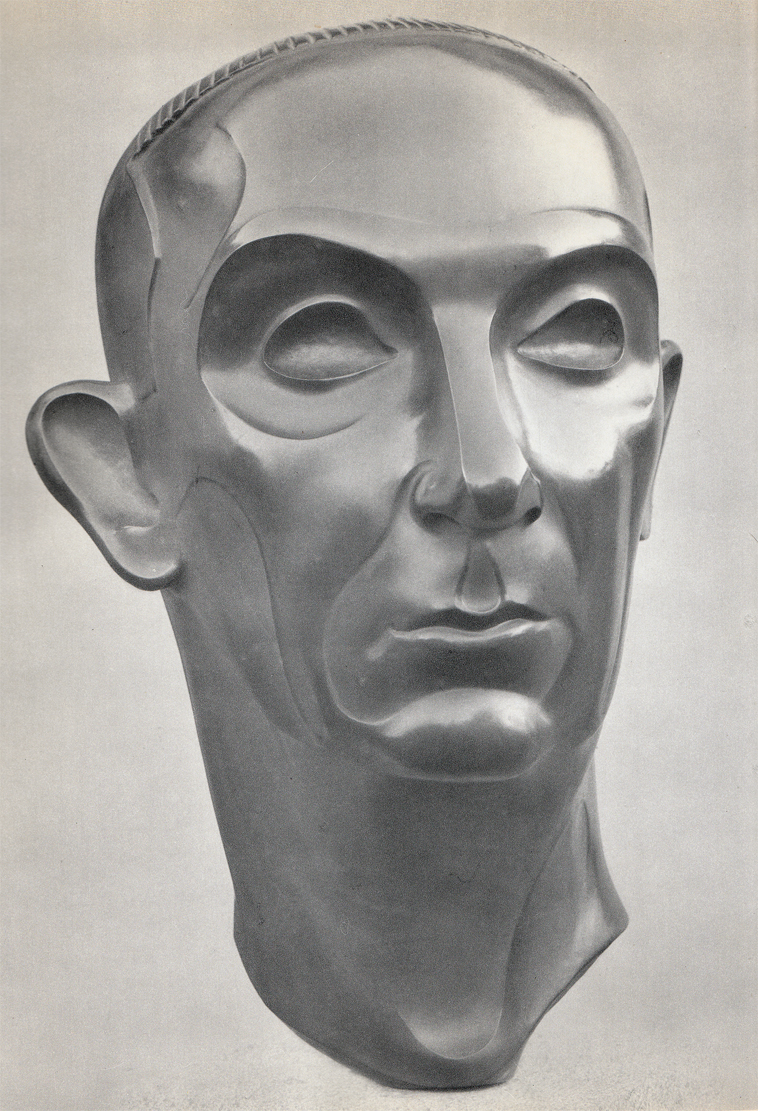
Portrait of Wiwen Nilsson in bronze by Christian Berg 1943.

Karl Edvin (Wiwen) Nilsson (19 May 1897 in Copenhagen - 8 January 1974) was a Swedish silversmith and jeweller for the royals. As young he learned the trade by studies and practical work for his father Ander Nilsson in Lund, he educated himself abroad in Germany between 1913 and 1914, and then later he continued more studies in 1919 and 1920. In 1927, he took over his father's business in Lund. Wiwen Nilsson made his debut with his work at the Gothenburg Exhibition in 1923 where his china coffee service was appreciated as a bold and innovative modernistic piece.

Nilsson became one of the 1900's most appreciated and well known silversmiths both in Sweden and internationally. During the 1940s, he had a store in New York.
