= Halmstadgruppen =

Swedish artist group active in early to mid-20th century

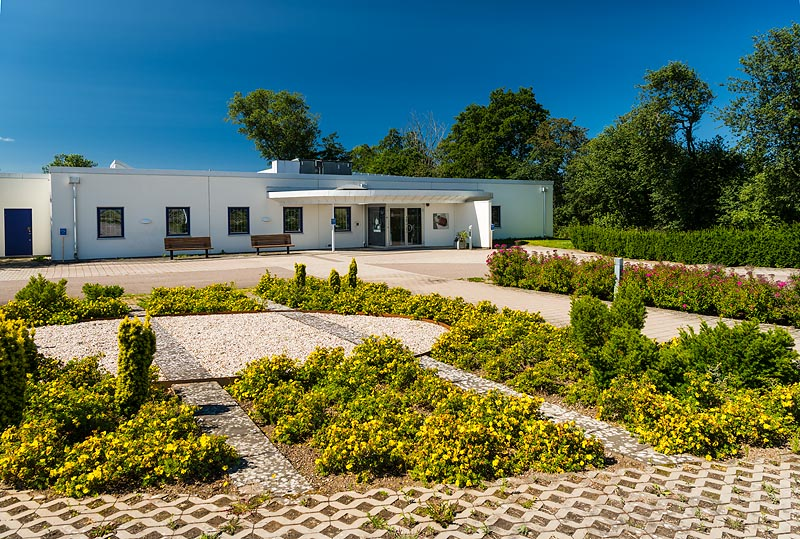
Mjellby Art Museum outside Halmstad, Sweden

Halmstadgruppen was a group of six artists that collectively followed and developed avant-garde modern art movements such as cubism, post-cubism, purist, futurist and surrealism at Halmstad in Halland County, Sweden. A permanent showroom in Mjellby, now Mjellby Art Museum in Halmstad was created to exhibit their art. Here an extensive collection of the Halmstadgruppen works are exhibited. The museum was founded in 1980 by Swedish art critic and museum director Viveka Bosson. She is the daughter of the late Erik Olson, one of the members in Halmstadgruppen. Bosson bought the former site of the Mjellby folkskola (elementary school) outside Halmstad in 1980, setting up Mjellby Art Museum and later donated it to the Halmstad Municipality in 1997.

== History ==
Impressed by the avant-garde movements Axel Olson, his younger brother Erik and their cousin Waldemar Lorentzon in Halmstad formed into a group aptly calling themselves "Gnistan" which translated means “The Spark”.

In May 1919, “Gnistan” made their debut at an amateur exhibition in Halmstad. Through this they met Egon Östlund an engineer philanthropist, who was also exhibiting with some Gösta Adrian-Nilsson (GAN) influenced canvases of his own GAN was a close friend of Östlund.

By July 1919, Östlund had introduced them to Gösta Adrian-Nilsson who was spending part of the summer with friends in Halmstad. Stellan Mörner's father had become governor of Halland County. This had prompted Stellen to return from Paris to exhibit his art in the Halmstad city library and work on a local commission. Mörner was an artist with a skill for portraiture but again was interested in the avant-garde.

Egon Östlund, introduced Mörner to the young painters Sven Jonson and Esaias Thorén. They organized an exhibition in Halmstad in 1929. Stellen Mörner exhibited his modern art paintings together with Erik and Axel Olson, Sven Jonson, Waldemar Lorentzon and Esaias Thorén. The local Halmstad press denounced the exhibition of new modernist art with derision. However, unfazed the young Halmstad artists were invited to exhibit in Lund that year. The Halmstad group was born as they got together in 1929, a group with the single aim of introducing cubism, surrealism and concrete art (modern art) to Swedish audiences. They engaged an imaginative and dreamlike imagery with figurative content and expressions of their costal origin in a plain geometric image, giving an adequate expression using pure colour and form synthesis. In the 1930s the young artists had slipped from early cubism into a surrealist imagery of a Nordic character. The Halmstadgruppen lasted 50 years together. This period was the end of Dadasim and the beginning of the “Age of Anxiety” as described in the poem by W.H. Auden, published in 1947. During the years 1922–23, Axel Olson (1899-1986) studied in Berlin with the Russian painter and sculptor Alexander Archipenko. Axel's brother Erik Olson (1901-1986) and their cousin Waldemar Lorentzon (1899-1984) studied in 1924 at the Fernand Léger painting academy in Paris. Sven Jonson (1902-1981), Stellan Mörner (1896-1979), and Esaias Thorén (1901- 1981), also studied in Paris during that time. During their periods abroad they came in contact with modern developments in painting. Returning to Sweden, Halmstadgruppen was founded in 1929 and was unchanged until 1979, with the death of Stellan Mörner .

The members of Halmstadgruppen were pioneers in the Swedish modernist art movement. During the 1920s, they were cubists and during the 1930s introduced surrealism in Sweden together with Gösta Adrian-Nilsson (1884–1965).

== Members ==
- Stellan Mörner (1896–1979)
- Waldemar Lorentzon (1899–1984)
- Axel Olson (1899–1986)
- Esaias Thorén (1901–1981)
- Erik Olson (1901–1986)
- Sven Jonson (1902–1981)

== Other sources ==
- Folke Holmér (1947) Halmstadgruppen. Waldemar Lorentzon, Axel Olson, Erik Olson, Esaias Thorén, Sven Jonson, Stellan Mörner (Stockholm, Rabén & Sjögren)
