= Gösta Adrian-Nilsson =

Swedish artist and writer

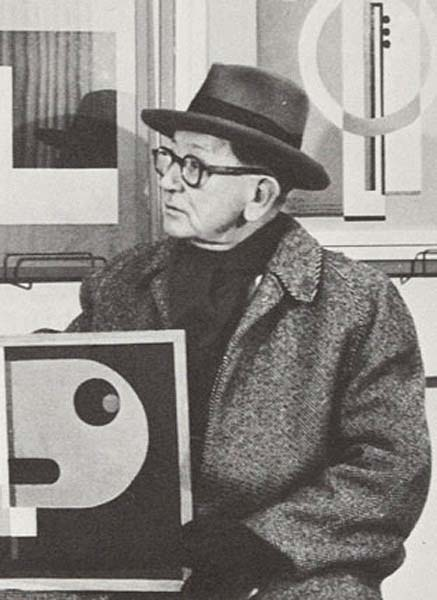
- Gösta Adrian-Nilsson, 1960
- Born: 2 April 1884; Lund, Sweden
- Died: 29 March 1965 (aged 80); Stockholm, Sweden
- Known for: Paintings
- Movement: Modernism, avant-garde

Gösta Adrian-Nilsson (2 April 1884 – 29 March 1965), usually referred to as GAN, was a Swedish artist and writer. He is regarded as a pioneer of the Swedish modernist art movement. His style was fluid with changing trends and contained elements of Cubism, futurism, Expressionism, Surrealism, avant-garde, progressivism, romanticism, and abstract.

His works primarily featured very masculine men, particularly sailors, labourers, and athletes, and elements of industry, such as factories, machines, and cars. Despite being spurned by the Swedish press, Adrian-Nilsson was well-respected in avant-garde circles.

== Early life ==
Adrian-Nilsson was born on 2 April 1884 in Lund, Sweden to Anna and Nils Adrian-Nilsson. His parents ran a hawker in town. He later recalled being interested in his brother's geography book, both for the maps and for the illustrations of nude sailors. Collections of poetry and illustrations from his childhood are now kept at Lund University Library.

Adrian-Nilsson attended the local Cathedral School before moving to Malmö in 1904 for a pharmacy apprenticeship. There, he decided to pursue a career in art instead and moved to Stockholm, where he attended the Technical School. He finished in 1905 and worked as a designer for a furniture company before completing his mandatory military service the following year.

== Career ==
In 1907, Adrian-Nilsson debuted as both a poet and an artist with an art exhibition at Lund University. This was the first time he used the pseudonym GAN. His early artwork centered on Art Nouveau and often featured images of Oscar Wilde, whose openly homosexual lifestyle Adrian-Nilsson admired. Around this time, he met Bengt Lidforss, a biologist from Lund University who was openly gay, and they left Sweden for Copenhagen in 1910.

In Denmark, Adrian-Nilsson attended Kristian Zahrtmann's School, where he learned about Post-Impressionist art. His artwork gradually became more progressive. In January 1913, he moved to Berlin, where Lidforss put him in contact with the city's avant-garde community. He met Nell and Herwarth Walden, a writer and an artist who owned Der Sturm Galerie. Der Sturm was a major part of Berlin's progressive community, and through it Adrian-Nilsson encountered Futurism, Cubism, and abstract art. He also became friends with Egon Östlund and other members of the Halmstad group. His own art style became more abstract, influenced by Wassily Kandinsky and Franz Marc.

In summer 1914, Adrian-Nilsson was an artistic manager for Bruno Taut's Glass Pavilion at the Werkbund Exhibition in Cologne. However, after learning his partner Karl Holmström had died suddenly of pneumonia in Lund, Adrian-Nilsson returned to his hometown. Despite his departure, his work was shown in a Swedish Expressionist exhibition at Der Sturm in April and May 1915. Eleven more paintings were shown at the gallery in 1917 in his absence.

Adrian-Nilsson moved back to Stockholm in 1916 and continued producing artwork featuring athletes, soldiers, sailors, and labourers, along with symbols of industrialism such as factories. Elements of prostitution and cruising also made appearances. Adrian-Nilsson contributed to journals and newspapers including Arbetet and the avant-garde journal flammen. By 1919, he had become the "first artist working in Sweden to create purely abstract art."

Adrian-Nilsson moved to Paris in June 1920. His studio was in the same building as Fernand Léger, who he became friends with. He also befriended Alexander Archipenko and Wiwen Nilsson. He experimented with Dadaist collage during the 1920s and his artwork became more "geometrically stylized." He held a solo exhibition at Der Sturm in summer 1922 at the request of Herwarth Walden. He returned to Lund in 1925 and visited Berlin for the final time in November 1930. In 1928, he designed costumes for the Royal Swedish Opera. Adrian-Nilsson moved to Stockholm in 1931, where he remained for the rest of his life. During the 1930s, his paintings became more surrealist; it was during this time that younger members of the Halmstad group were influenced by him.

Adrian-Nilsson's work was snubbed by the Swedish press, with many critics calling his work "chaotic," though they rarely mentioned the sexual undertone of his paintings. Still, his homosexuality garnered disdain from the public. He was, however, well-respected in avant-garde artistic and intellectual circles. In addition to oil paintings, Adrian-Nilsson produced watercolour works and wrote poems, short stories, and children's books. His diaries, letters, manuscripts, photographs, and other works are preserved at the University Library of Lund.

== Personal life ==
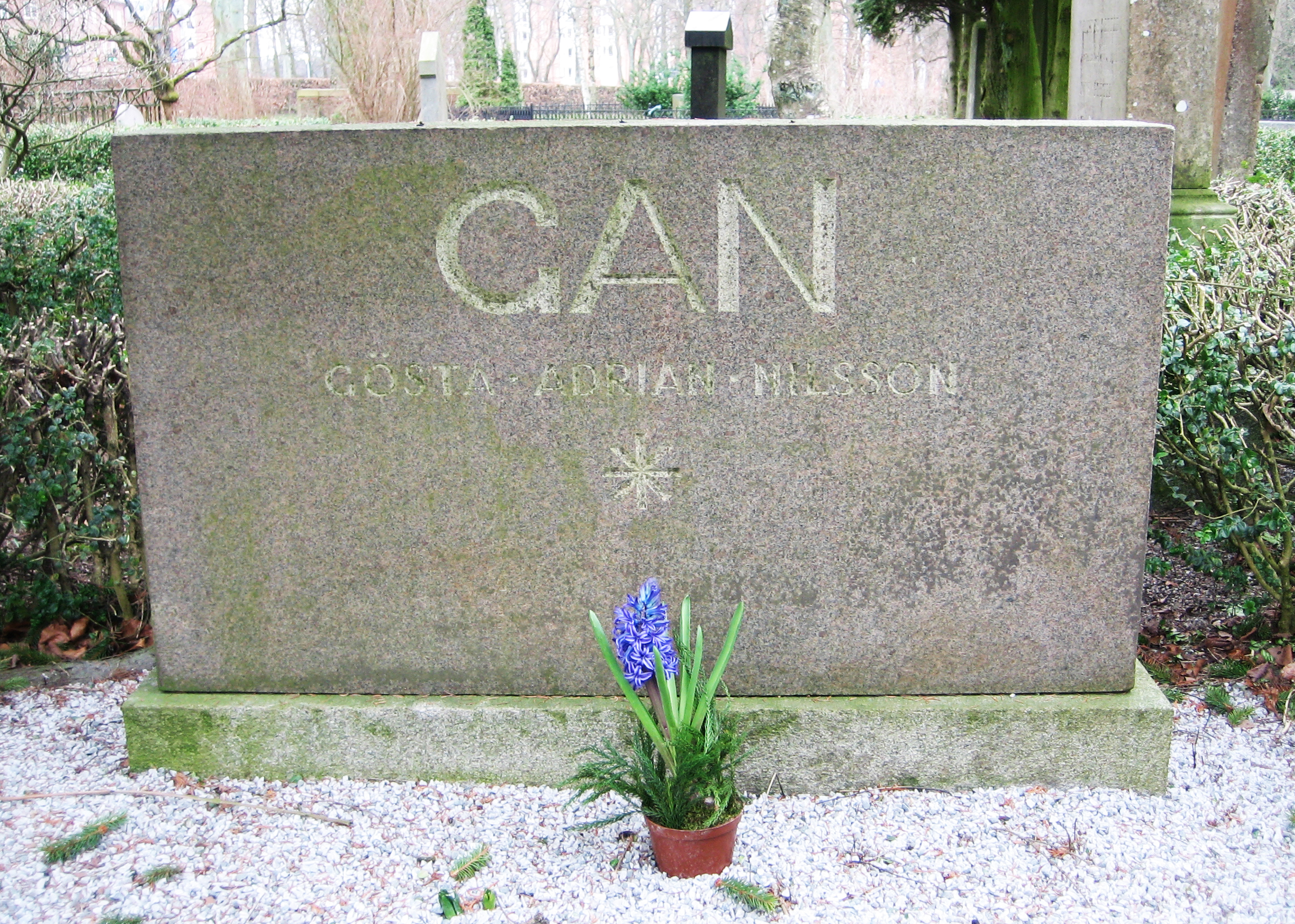
Gösta Adrian-Nilsson's tombstone in Lund

From 1940, Adrian-Nilsson "liv[ed] in bitter voluntary isolation", spurred by his anger about not garnering the amount of success and recognition he felt he deserved. He died in Stockholm on 29 March 1965 and was buried at Norra Kyrkogården (Northern Cemetery) in Lund.

Adrian-Nilsson had two deeply impactful romantic relationships in his life. The first was with Karl Edvard Holmström, who he met in Lund in 1908 while cruising. Holmström was 16 and Adrian-Nilsson was 24. Adrian-Nilsson nicknamed him Ilja after the main character in Maxim Gorky's Three of Them; this is reflected in Adrian-Nilsson's portrait of Holmström, titled Ilja. Holmström accompanied him to Berlin in 1913 but returned to Sweden at the end of the year when he was recalled to work in an armaments factory. He died of pneumonia the following summer, which prompted Adrian-Nilsson to move home to Lund.

In June 1917, Adrian-Nilsson met Edvin Andersson, a 22-year-old torpedo operator in the Swedish Navy, while cruising in a park. Adrian-Nilsson's exhibition Sjömanskompositioner (Sailor compositions) in 1918 was inspired by and dedicated to Andersson. Following the end of World War I, Andersson changed his name to Edvin Ganborg, a nod to Adrian-Nilsson's alias GAN, "to indicate his alliance with the artist." The two fell out of contact for a period, wherein Andersson had married and had two children, but they reconnected in 1935. For several decades, alongside his full-time job as a machinist, he worked as an art dealer in Norrköping selling Adrian-Nilsson's paintings.

== Selected work ==
Adrian-Nilsson's artwork is held at the Nationalmuseum, Moderna Museet, Gothenburg Museum of Art, Museum of Östergötland, Malmö Art Museum, and Waldemarsudde, though the largest collection of his works is at Kulturen in Lund.

Year	Original title	Title in English	Notes	Ref
1908	Självporträtt	Self-portrait	Oil painting	
1908		Youth with burning heart	Indian ink	
1908	Ynglingen och döden	Young man with death	Gouache and watercolour	
1911–1912	Ilja	Ilja	Portrait of Karl Edvard Holmström	
1913	Tusch			
1914	Figur med hjärta	Figure with Heart	Watercolour	
1915	Jack	Jack	Watercolour	
1916–1917	Fantasi	Fantasy	Ink, watercolour, color chalk	
1917	Figurkomposition med matroser		Ink	
1917	Roddexercis	Rodd		
1923	Akrobater	Acrobats	Watercolour, gouache, India ink, coloured pencil	
1923	Bains	Baths		
1924	Akrobater i Paris	Acrobats in Paris	Oil painting	
1926	Tjur och Matador III	Bull and Matador III		
1927	Döende matador	Dying Matador	Oil painting	
1928	Inspiration	Inspiration	Oil painting	
1929	Skuggspel, Vårljusskymning	Shaddows, twilight	Oil painting	
1934	Ensam vandrare	Lonely hiker	Watercolour	
1949	Någon är död	Someone is dead	Mixed media	
