= Albin Amelin =

Swedish artist (1902–1975)

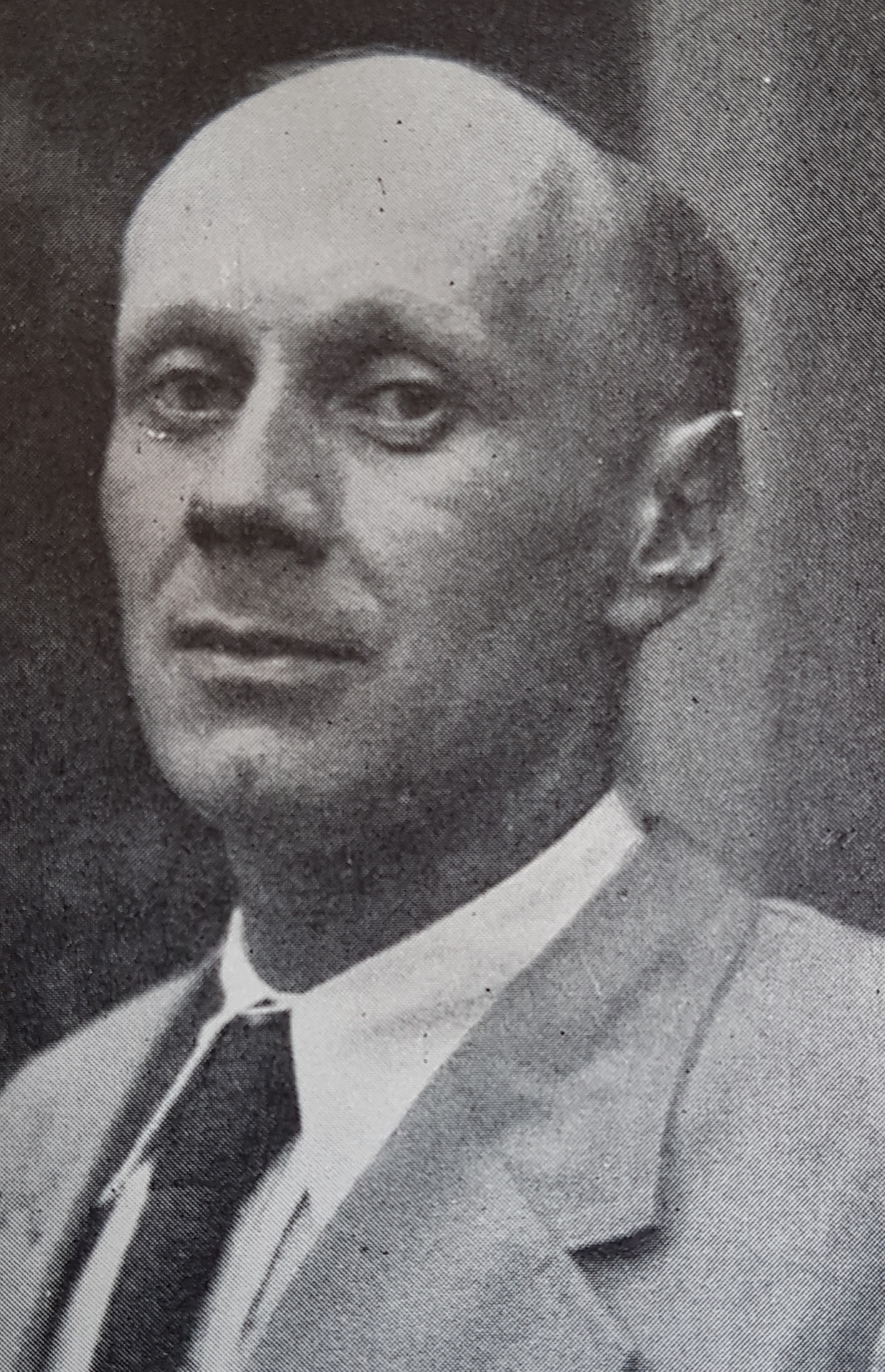
- Born: 25 January 1902; Chicago, Illinois, United States
- Died: 8 February 1975 (aged 73); Barrevik, Orust, Sweden
- Education: Konstfack
- Known for: Illustration, painting
- Movement: Expressionism

Hans Albin Agaton Amelin (25 January 1902 – 8 February 1975) was a Swedish artist.

== Biography ==
Amelin was born in Chicago in the United States. Amelin began working as a typography student in 1915 and studied at the Konstfack in Stockholm and from 1919 to 1921 and later continued studies in Paris. He made his debut in 1929 and was one of the founders of the Färg och Form art gallery in 1932. He was a politically conscious painter and his motifs are often socially emphasized, often depicting workers. However he painted landscapes as well as still life in expressionist style.

Amelin joined the Communist Party of Sweden in 1929. He was the founder of the Association of Independent Artists of Sweden. He headed the society "Art for the people".

In connection with the International Labor Organization's 50th anniversary in 1969, the Swedish Post Office issued a stamp with the motif Arbetarhuvud by Amelin. He is buried in Bromma cemetery.
