= Anti-American sentiment in Russia =

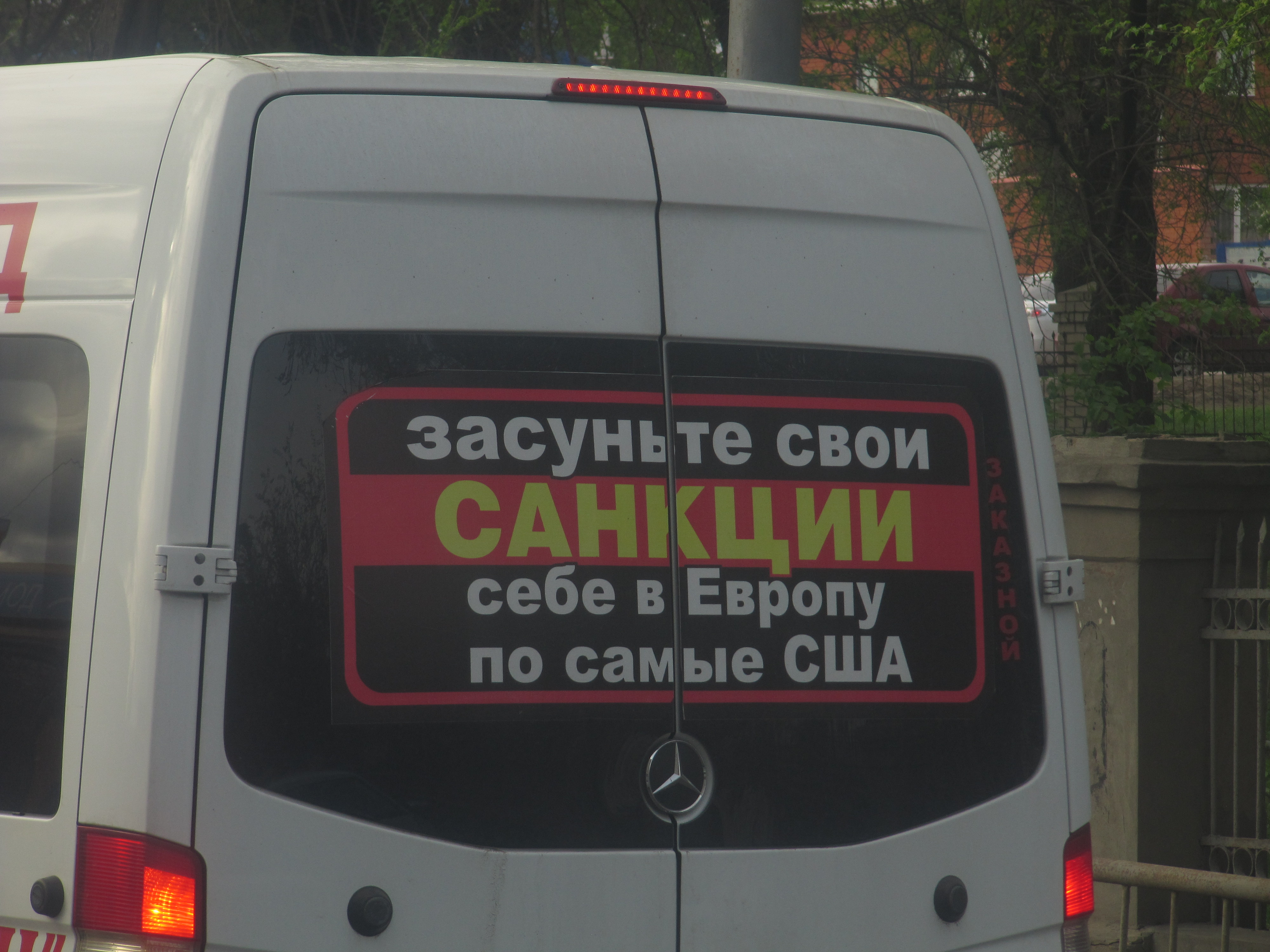
Anti-American slogan on the back of a marshrutka in Volgograd. Translation: "Shove your SANCTIONS in Europe right up to the USA."

Anti-American sentiment has been present in Russia for a long time, dating back to the Russian Revolution in 1917. Relations were frozen until 1933, when the US President Franklin Roosevelt decided to establish diplomatic relations with the USSR. The US and the USSR fought alongside each other in World War II, but following the end of the war, the United States was opposed to the Soviet Union's military occupation and domination of Eastern Europe. As tensions grew into the Cold War, relations became hostile with large-scale war plans, but no direct war took place.

Tensions between the two countries were briefly relaxed in the 1970s owing to detente, but relations took a turn for the worse again in the early 1980s with the Soviet invasion of Afghanistan. By 1989, the communist governments in the Eastern European Soviet satellite states were overthrown, and in 1991, the USSR itself was dissolved, leading to a brief era of cooperation between the US and the newly-formed Russian Federation. With the advent of the 21st century, relations gradually turned hostile, and remain so.

In Russian opinion polls, the United States and its allies have consistently topped the list of Russia's greatest enemies.

== History ==
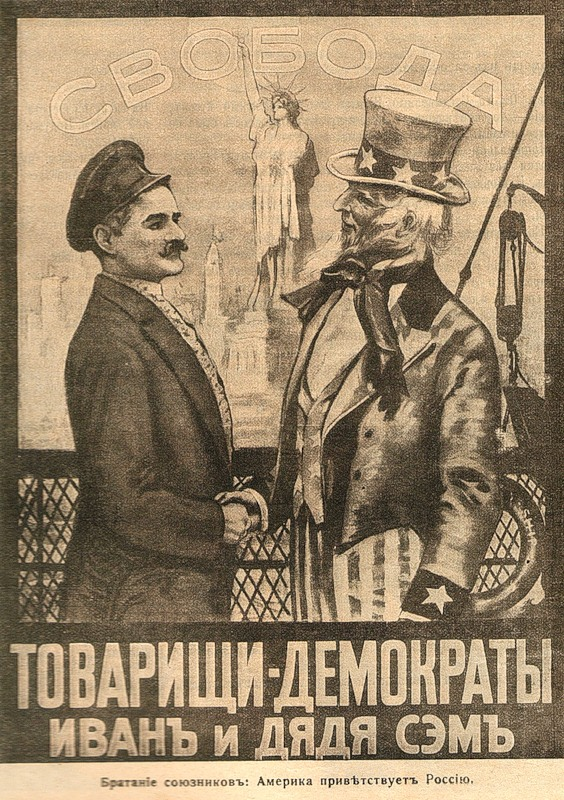
A 1917 Russian poster saying "Comrades democrats, Ivan and Uncle Sam"

In 1912, future leader of Soviet Russia Vladimir Lenin described the American two-party system (that is, the Republican and Democratic Parties) as "meaningless duels between the two bourgeois parties". The proposed alternative was the so-called dictatorship of the proletariat where the ruling communist vanguard party is the only allowed political entity.

As early as in 1919, Lenin was recorded addressing Red Army soldiers where he claimed that "capitalists of England, France and America are waging war against Russia". The image of Uncle Sam was also used by the Bolsheviks to portray White Russian forces as foreign-sponsored.

After World War II, the political contradictions between United States and Soviet Union started to grow. As a result, anti-American sentiment grew, driven by state media.

=== Cold War era politics ===
As early as the late 1940s, the Central Committee of the Soviet Communist Party issued decrees and orders to promote anti-American sentiments within the Soviet public.
For instance, Central Committee document #148 of 1949 read:

Article-1

1. In print news media such as "Pravda", "Izvestiya", "Trud", "Literaturnaya Gazeta", "Komsomolskaya Gazeta", "Bolshevik" and others, organize systematic publications of materials, articles and pamphlets, unmasking aggressive plans of American imperialism, inhumane character of social and political order of the U.S., debunking American propaganda "fables" about American "prosperity", showcasing deep controversies in US economy, mendaciousness of bourgeois democracy, the idiocy of modern American bourgeois culture and morals.

Article-15

15. The following themes should provide the basis for anti-American propaganda in press, radio and movies:
...
Capitalistic monopolies of US inspirators of aggression policy ...
US stronghold of colonial enslavement and colonial wars ...
Monopolies feed fascism on American soil ...
Democracy in US hypocritical coverup for absolute rule of capital ...
Myth of high standards of living for all social classes in US...
Myth of universal equality and equal opportunities for everyone in US...
Degeneration of American culture...
Decay of cinematography in US...
Corrupt American press...
Crime in US...
...

=== Decaying West ===
"Decaying West" or "Rotting West" (rus: "Загнивающий запад") was the term used in the Soviet era to refer to the social order and moral norms in the United States and other Western countries, which were allegedly corrupt and rapidly eroding. The phrase also meant to emphasize the "imminent collapse of capitalism", although in the end it was the Soviet Union that collapsed.

=== Barack Obama ===
In mid-2016, after tensions rose between the U.S. and Russia, a Tatarstan ice cream factory produced "Obamka" (little Obama) ice cream with packaging showing a black child wearing an earring; the move was seen as an illustration of both anti-Americanism in Russia and enduring, Soviet-era racism in the country. The company, which stated that the ice cream was not intended to be political, halted production of the line shortly after the controversy arose.

== Polls ==
List of greatest enemies according to Russian public opinion polls.

Public Opinion Foundation (2011)
"Levada" Analytical Center (2012)
"Levada" Analytical Center (2013)

Rank	Country/Region	%
1	United States	26%
2	China	13%
3	Georgia	5%
4	Japan	3%
5	Belarus	2%

Rank	Country/Region	%
1	Georgia	41%
2	United States	35%
3	Latvia	26%
4	Lithuania	25%
5	Estonia	23%
6	Ukraine	15%
7	Poland	8%

Rank	Country/Region	%
1	United States	38%
2	Georgia	33%
3	Latvia	21%
4	Lithuania	17%
5	Estonia	16%

A December 2017 survey conducted by the Chicago Council and its Russian partner, the Levada Center, showed that:

Seventy-eight percent of Russians polled said the United States meddles "a great deal" or "a fair amount" in Russian politics, compared to 69 percent of Americans who say the same about Russian interference in U.S. politics. ... The poll found that 31 percent of Russians said Moscow tried to influence U.S. domestic affairs in a significant way, compared to 55 percent of Americans who felt that their own government tried to do the same thing in Russia. ... Only 31 percent of Americans say they hold a positive view of Russia, and 24 percent of Russians say the same of the United States. ... Eighty-one percent of Russians said they felt the United States was working to undermine Russia on the world stage; 77 percent of Americans said the same of Russia.

Survey results published by the Levada Center indicate that, as of August 2018, Russians increasingly viewed the United States positively following the Russia–U.S. summit in Helsinki in July 2018. However, only 14% of Russians expressed net approval of Donald Trump's policies in 2019. According to the Pew Research Center, "57% of Russians ages 18 to 29 see the U.S. favorably, compared with only 15% of Russians ages 50 and older."

== US and Russian domestic politics ==
After the color revolutions of the 2000s took place in former Soviet states with tacit support of the US, the political climate and processes in Russia have intensified as well. Those revolutions were perceived extremely negatively in Moscow.

=== US and political opposition in Russia ===
According to Russian media (especially major federal TV networks), the current Russian opposition has strong ties to the US and its allies. Furthermore, many government channels systematically broadcast documentaries, TV programs and journalistic researches, which claim that many opposition leaders are directly funded and supported by the US government, with an ultimate goal to destabilize the political and constitutional order in Russia.

Accusations have intensified during and after 2011 Russian legislative election, as well as 2012 Russian presidential election, which resulted in 2011–2013 Russian protests by the opposition.

In 2012, the major Russian national TV network NTV, created a series of documentaries called Anatomy of Protest (rus: Анатомия протеста) claiming that 2011–2013 Russian protests, organized by the opposition leaders, were carefully watched and influenced by some Western nations and the US in particular.

Some Russian officials interviewed in the film openly state that the US is actively working on bringing extremist groups to power in Russia, which would allow it to discredit Russia on the global stage and even to justify a military strike on the country.

On November 19, 2021, two members of the U.S. Congress said the United States should cease to recognize Vladimir Putin as president of Russia after 2024; the Kremlin denounced it as an attempt to meddle in its domestic affairs.

=== "Foreign Agents" and "Undesirable Organizations" ===
In July 2012, the Russian foreign agent law was introduced. It requires nonprofit organizations that receive foreign donations and engage in "political activity" to be labeled as "foreign agents", which carries, in Russian, strong associations with Cold War-era espionage. Organizations are obliged to mark all their publications and begin each oral statement with a disclosure that it is being given by a foreign agent. They are subject to inspections and raids. Several US-based organizations have been targeted including Human Rights Watch.

In September 2012, Russian authorities demanded the end of operations of the United States Agency for International Development. According to officials, some activities conducted by the organization were hostile and undermined Russian sovereignty.

In May 2015, the Russian undesirable organizations law was introduced. Russian prosecutors are able to target foreign groups whose "undesirable activities" are deemed to threaten "state security" or the "basic values of the Russian state". Given a notice from the prosecutors, such organizations have to disband.

Violators face fines or prison terms of up to six years. People cooperating with such entities are subject to fines and can be banned from entering Russia. Duma deputy Aleksandr Tarnavsky, one of the legislation's coauthors, stated, "I do not think that there is a particular company that has to fall under this list. But if a company suddenly starts causing a lot of trouble, starts acting arrogantly and impudently, then in theory it could fall under the list of undesirable organizations." The law was used to target the National Endowment for Democracy and the John D. and Catherine T. MacArthur Foundation.

== Geopolitical views and theories ==
The following views and theories are common in Russian mainstream national media. Some of them are voiced by top government officials and supported by major Russian think tanks and academia:

=== Centuries-long standoff between the West and Russia ===
According to some popular Russian political writers and scientists, there is a centuries-long geopolitical standoff between Russia and the Western nations, especially with the Anglo-Saxon states such as the US and the UK, which have been openly and covertly working on destroying Russia by any means since the times of the Great Game.

- Distinguished political scientist Sergey Kurginyan (Russian: Сергей Кургинян) believes that the US is currently engaged in further expanding its "neo-colonial empire" and that Russia is the only hurdle on the way to achieving those goals.
- Popular political writer Nikolai Starikov (Russian: Николай Стариков) believes that a number of major geopolitical events of the last centuries, including the dissolution of the Soviet Union, were direct results of covert plans devised and executed by US and/or the UK. In many of his books, such as Who's funding disintegration of Russia - From Decembrists to Mujahideens (Russian: Кто финансирует развал России - от декабристов до моджахедов), Starikov attempts to prove that since the early 19th century, all the major political shocks in Russia had powerful foreign sponsors and planners, particularly the US and the UK.
- Vladimir Putin's top security adviser Nikolai Patrushev (rus: Николай Патрушев) states that the United States "would much rather that Russia did not exist at all as a country," because "we possess great [natural] resources. The Americans believe that we control them illegally and undeservedly because, in their view, we do not use them as they ought to be used." Patrushev also referenced "Madeleine Albright's claim 'that neither the Far East nor Siberia belong to Russia.'" There is no record of Albright having made such a remark. Instead, it can be traced back to a psychic employed by the FSB who claimed to have read the thoughts in Albright's mind.

=== Imminent war between West and Russia ===
There are some political writers, active and retired military officers as well as other public figures in Russia, who openly claim that war with the US or the NATO is imminent. Believers include:

- Head of State Duma Defense Committee, Admiral Vladimir Komoedov (rus: Владимир Комоедов):
  Admiral Kovoedov believes that after a war with Iran, the US will conduct a nuclear strike on Russia.
- Retired major general Alexander Vladimirov (rus: Александр Владимиров) believes that the only factor that stops war from unravelling today is Russia's nuclear arsenal.
- Popular political scientist Sergey Kurginyan (rus: Сергей Кургинян) believes that after completing its mission in Syria and Iran, the West will definitively conduct some force operation against Russia.
- Russian Academy of Sciences International and Political Research Division Senior Research Scientist, and Doctor of Historical Sciences, professor Vyacheslav Dashichev (rus: Вячеслав Дашичев) strongly believes that tensions between Russia and Ukraine over natural gas, will eventually lead to a war with the West, the US in particular.
- CNews journal columnist Mihail Levkevich (rus: Михаил Левкевич) suggests that the military exercise "Operation Chimichanga", conducted by the Pentagon on April 4, 2012, was in reality a major rehearsal of U.S. attack on Russia and China.

=== Biological, weather, and other unconventional warfare against Russia ===
Many Russian top government officials and experts believe that the US will or has already conducted acts of non-conventional warfare against Russia.

- Chief Sanitary Inspector of Russia Gennadiy Onishchenko:
  In 2013, Russia's chief food and drug inspector accused the US of conducting a biowarfare against Russia According to Mr. Onishenko, the Georgian biological laboratory built with US cooperation and funding "is an important element of the US offensive military-biological potential". Earlier, high ranking government official claimed that the outbreak of African swine fever in Russia was planned sabotage, originating from the American lab in Georgia.

=== Information warfare against Russia ===
In modern Russia, there is a common and widespread notion that Western nations (especially the US and UK) have been and still are actively engaged in an information assault on Russia. Many public figures openly state that the West is using a wide range of means to discredit the nation on a global stage.

- Arkady Mamontov (rus: Аркадий Мамонтов) is a popular journalist who hosts a show called Special Correspondent (rus: "Специальный корреспондент"), every Tuesday on Rossiya 1.
  He claims that the performance of Pussy Riot in Cathedral of Christ the Saviour was a carefully orchestrated information war operation against Russia with the aim of offending Russian Christians and discrediting the country worldwide. In a series of special TV programs called Instigators (rus: Провокаторы), journalists gathered public on talk shows, to unmask the alleged true faces of the Pussy Riot members and to unveil true foreign the masterminds behind the "assault". Mamontov and the public gathered on the programs believe that Eastern Orthodox Church is one of the pillars on which a rising Russia will stand and that the western countries are trying to undermine it.

=== US as global social and economic parasite ===
According to many Russian scholars, government officials as well as media, economic prosperity and wellbeing of United States is solely based on unfair advantages gained from US dollar's reserve currency status, dollarization of other countries economies, along with neocolonial wars for resources and predatory macroeconomic behavior. Proponents of this view include:
Top government officials

- Vladimir Putin, in August 2011, accused the US of living like parasite off the global economy and the monopoly of the dollar.
- Member of Parliament from United Russia, Yevgeni Fedorov (rus: Евгений Федоров) believes that for decades, the US has been violating Russia's sovereignty and claims that currently, Russia is disgracefully paying tribute money to the "empire". In 2012, he drafted a bill to ban the Russian government from investing oil profits into US dollar-denominated securities or any other foreign currency.

Media

- Economist and the president of Different Reforms Center (rus: центр Другие реформы), Andrey Godzinskiy (rus: Андрей Годзинский): believes that Russia is currently being economically occupied and that the US dollar is ultimate tool.
- Mikhail Leontyev, pundit and a host of the TV program "Odnako" on Russian national network Channel One, created a series of documentaries, "Big American Hole". In the films, he claims that American economic prosperity is solely based on predatory economic behavior, which is supported only by military might. The documentaries explicitly state that the latest US wars in Afghanistan and Iraq were purely the wars for resources. Along with author, many guests and participants in the films, also claim that the US is getting great benefits from dollarization of various countries' economies, possible only by intimidation of countries by US military might.
- Journalist and filmmaker Ilya Kolosov (rus: Илья Колосов), in cooperation with Andrey Godzinskiy, from 2006 to 2009, created a series of documentaries called "Priceless Dollar" (rus: "Бесценный Доллар"). Authors claim that after World War II, U.S. has cunningly gained unfair economic advantage by exploiting the dollar as a reserve currency. Journalists also claim that US has been deliberately running big trade deficits for unfairly consuming goods produced by other countries and paying for them with allegedly worthless dollars. The documentaries have been showcased on TV Tsentr

Academia

- Russian Academy of Sciences (RAS), on December 19, 2013, held a conference titled "Global social parasitism (100 years to U.S. Federal Reserve System)" (rus: "Глобальный социальный паразитизм (к 100-летию Федеральной Резервной Системы США))". The agenda of the conference was to discuss broad range of issues centered around global parasitic behavior of the US, global financial institutes such as IMF, World Bank and Fed serving that behavior, as well as the imminent collapse of dollarized economies.
  Participants/Contributors:
  - RAS Central Economic Mathematical Institute
  - RAS Shirshov Institute of Oceanology
  - D.S.Lvov Institute of New Economy
  - Center for Scientific Politics and Ideology
  - Academy of Geopolitical Problems

=== Imminent dissolution of United States ===
The imminent disintegration of the United States is a widespread belief in Russia since the Bolshevik takeover in 1917. According to the theory, the United States is torn by deep controversies in politics, economy, ethnic relations and overall society. This theory gained high popularity after the 2012 state petitions for secession.

- Popular political scientist and ex-KGB officer Igor Panarin (rus: Игорь Панарин), since 1998, has claimed that the United States will soon cease to exist. In 2009, he published a book The Crash of the Dollar and the Disintegration of the USA (rus: Крах доллара и распад США) In the book, he also claims that by the time the US falls apart, Russia will regain its former world stance and reintegrate former Soviet states under its rule, on the basis of Eurasian Union.
- A member of the Federal Council of Party Action, political activist and journalist Maxim Kalashnikov (rus: Максим Калашников) claims that the United States will split into four to six independent countries.

Prominent believers:

- Chairman of Printed Media Distribution Association Board, Alexander Oskin (rus: Александр Оськин), is convinced that the collapse and dissolution of the United States is imminent. He believes that the US is suffering from tremendous tensions between, whites and nonwhites, rich and poor, Christians and Muslims, etc. In addition, outrageous suppression and violation of human rights by the US government will eventually strengthen secessionist processes that will shatter the United States into pieces.
- A journalist of Ren-TV, Igor Prokopenko (rus: Игорь Прокопенко), in his television program Military Secret (rus: - Военная Тайна), claimed that the US is suffering from tremendous amount of social, ethnic and other tensions. According to Prokopenko, its Asian and Mexican populations grew well over 20-30% and that those racial and ethnic groups would demand secession, which will eventually result in collapse and disintegration of the United States. He showcases former Texas governor Rick Perry's secessionist speech of 2009.

== Conspiracy theories ==
=== 9/11 ===
9/11 conspiracy theories are popular in Russia. According to many, the terror attacks were well planned and conducted by the US to justify the wars for oil in the Middle East.

- The president of Geopolitical Problems Academy, Colonel-General Leonid Ivashov (rus: Леонид Ивашов), claims that the 9/11 attacks were planned and executed provocations by US special services in close cooperation with Freemasonry members. He believes that American special services have carefully selected the terrorists based on their ethnic origin and fully funded and coordinated the operation. The ultimate goal of the acts was to further strengthen a global domination of the US by establishing strong presence in the oil-rich Middle East region.

=== Dulles Plan ===
The Dulles Plan or the Dulles Doctrine (Russian: План Даллеса or Доктрина Даллеса) is the central document of a conspiracy theory according to which the CIA chief Allen Dulles had developed a plan for United States to destroy the Soviet Union during the Cold War by covertly corrupting the cultural heritage and moral values of the Soviet nation. The plan was first published in Russia shortly after the dissolution of the USSR and was often quoted by prominent Russian politicians, journalists and writers.

=== Harvard Project ===
The Harvard Project (rus: Гарвардский Проект) or Harvard Project on the Soviet Social System was a 1950s research project funded by the USAF and conducted by Harvard University to study the economic and political order of Soviet society. However, some Russian political scientists and writers strongly believe that the main purpose of the project was to develop psychological and other means of influence over the Soviet people. According to believers, this research led the US to develop psychological and information warfare techniques, intensively used against the Soviet Union to destroy it. Some believe that those techniques are still being heavily used against Russia, with the purpose of destroying and partitioning the country into several parts, which will be eventually annexed by the US and its allies.

=== Moon landing ===
Moon landing conspiracy theories are widely spread in Russia. According to 2011 polls conducted by Russian Public Opinion Center, 40% of Russians do not believe that US astronauts have ever landed on the moon.

== Pindos ==
Russian-speakers may use the term "Pindos" or "Pendos" (Russian: Пиндос) when referring to Americans, and United States can be referred to as Pindosia (Пиндосия) or Pindostan (Пиндостан).

The term comes from Pindus mountain range in Greece, and was used by locals on territory of present-day Ukraine for Greek immigrants. The first precedent of the term referring to Americans likely occurred during Yugoslav wars, when Russian soldiers allegedly heard how Serbs used it for peacekeeper forces in Kosovo. Since then the term became widespread in political discussions on Russian internet.

== Recent events ==
=== Russo–Georgian War ===
After the Rose Revolution, the ex-Soviet Republic of Georgia changed its geopolitical preferences and started cooperating much more closely with NATO and the United States. That led the US and NATO to conduct very close cooperative work on the issues of military training and equipment with Georgia, which had unresolved territorial disputes, including South Ossetia.

In August 2008, those disputes resulted in a five-day Russia–Georgia war. The conflict spurred wave of anti-American sentiments in Russia. According to Putin, the war was directly related to presidential elections in the US. The official Russian position was that the US and its allies deliberately armed Georgia. Some Russian officials called the war a genocide, accusing the US of supporting such inhumane actions.

Shortly after the conflict, media producer and member of State Duma, Konstantin Rykov, created a documentary called War 08.08.08. Art of Betrayal. He claims that Georgia was trained and led by the U.S. into war with South Ossetia and Russia. The reason being that the US (then under George W. Bush) was interested in increasing presidential candidate John McCain's ratings, and demonizing Russia as an aggressor was key to it. The documentary had over a million views in first five days after being published online.

=== Ukraine ===
Starting with 2014, the events following the Euromaidan, the international response to the annexation of Crimea by the Russian Federation, 2014 pro-Russian unrest in Ukraine and the 2022 Russian invasion of Ukraine spurred a wave of anti-American sentiments in Russia.

At a government-organized "Anti-Maidan" demonstration in February 2015 gathering 35,000 people, the Maidan unrests were attributed to the United States. "Die, America" banners were on display and a speech stated, "Maidan is the smile of the American ambassador who, sitting in his penthouse, is happy to see how brother is killing brother." In July 2015, Putin's top security adviser Nikolai Patrushev stated that "the US themselves started the conflict in Ukraine."

According to polls by the independent Levada Center, in January 2015, 81 percent of Russians held negative views of the United States, a number that had nearly doubled over the previous year and that was by far the highest negative rating since it started tracking those views in 1988.

== Criticism ==
According to some Russian experts, anti-American sentiments are driven largely by domestic political climate and has little relationship to US foreign policy.

In response to the growing anti-Americanism after the South Ossetia War in the Russian intellectual-political class, the director of the Institute of Globalization and Social Movements, Boris Kagarlitsky, said, "Ironically, one of the dominant trends here is that we are anti-American because we want to be exactly like America. We are angry that Americans are allowed to invade minor nations and we are not."

In 2013, journalist Vladimir Posner shared his opinion that the anti-Americanism is "harmful for Russia" and has solely irrational reasons. One is that Russian people have still not forgiven United States for "winning the Cold War" (in his opinion, the Cold War, which is not thought by Russians to be lost on the surface, is felt by them lost deep in their minds and is lost in fact). He considers the anti-American rhetoric by Vladimir Putin made to be approved by the nation.

According to Moscow Carnegie Center Director Dmitriy Trenin, anti-Americanism in Russia is becoming the basis for official patriotism. Further researcher states that the Russian ruling elite have now stopped pretending that it follows the West and cherishes its declared values. Now, Moscow openly states that its values are not completely common with modern Western values in such fields as democracy, human rights, national sovereignty, role of government, the church, and the nature of family.

== See also ==
- Anti-American sentiment in China
- Anti-Russian sentiment in the United States
- Anti-Western sentiment in China
- Anti-Western sentiment
