= Elke Erb =

German author-poet (1938–2024)

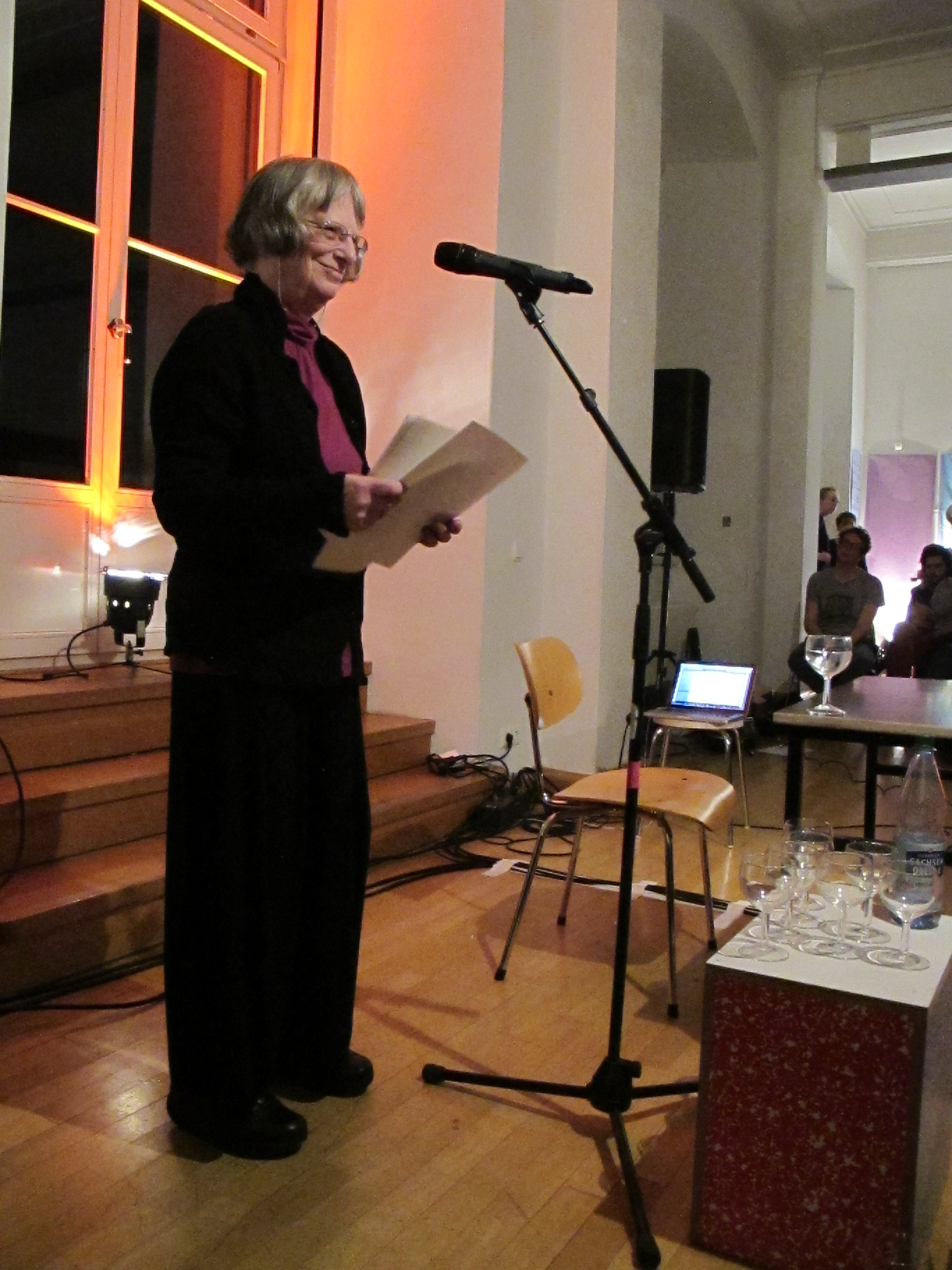
- Erb at Leipziger Buchmesse 2014
- Born: 18 February 1938; Scherbach, Germany
- Died: 22 January 2024 (aged 85); Berlin, Germany
- Occupations: Author-poet; Literary editor Translator
- Spouse: Adolf Endler
- Children: Konrad Endler
- Parent(s): Ewald Erb (1903–1978); Elisabeth

Elke Erb (18 February 1938 – 22 January 2024) was a German author-poet based in Berlin. She also worked as a literary editor and translator.

== Biography ==
=== Family provenance and early years ===
Elke Erb was born at Scherbach (today part of Rheinbach) in the hills south of Bonn. Her parents had moved there with her uncle Otto and his family in 1937 in order, as her father put it, to "overwinter National Socialism". Ewald Erb (1903–1978), her father, worked at the local tax office, having lost his academic post as a Marxist literary historian at the University of Bonn in 1933 on account of "Communist activities". Her mother Elisabeth worked on the land. Elke was the eldest of her parents' three daughters, all born in Scherbach between 1938 and 1941 when her father was conscripted for military service. Youngest of the three sisters is the author-poet Ute Erb.

As a member of the wartime German army Ewald Erb was at one stage charged with a form of sedition ("Wehrkraftzersetzung"), subsequently ending up as a prisoner of war. As far as the family were concerned, he was out of the picture between 1941 and 1949. In 1949 the family were reunited when Ewald Erb arranged for his wife and daughters to rejoin him at Halle in the Soviet occupation zone. By this time, he had already been working at Halle University for two years, having arrived directly from a British prisoner-of-war facility in 1947. However, Ewald Erb was living in Halle in a single rented room containing one writing desk and one bed. There was space for the girls' mother, but the children were sent to live in a "home" (a recently reassigned boarding school) for the next two years. For Elke Erb, approaching her teenage years, the result of the disruption and uncertainty was a lasting alienation from her parents.

=== Education ===
After the war ended she attended school locally. At this point, the family all believed that her father was "missing in action". The move to Halle involved a change of school when Elke Erb was eleven. She successfully concluded her school career by passing the Abitur (final exams) in 1957. That was followed by a year as a farm worker during 1958/59 in the context of the Free German Youth ("Freie Deutsche Jugend" / FDJ) land-improvement project with a farm collective at Altmärkische Wische. This form of required "gap year" before embarking on higher education was not unusual in the German Democratic Republic at this time. (The postwar Soviet occupation zone had been relaunched and rebranded as the Soviet sponsored "German Democratic Republic" – East Germany – in October 1949.) She then, between 1959 and 1963, undertook a four-year degree course at Halle University in order to qualify as a teacher of German and Russian. She emerged with the necessary qualification along with the insight that for her a career in teaching would be nightmarish.

=== Literary editor ===
Erb then worked first as a volunteer and then as a literary editor with Mitteldeutscher Verlag between 1963 and 1966. This brought her into contact with several successful members of the East German literary establishment. She left after two years, however. In the second half of 1965 and early 1966 she was as a patient at a mental hospital. Later, she moved to Berlin and set about starting a career as a freelance writer. Initially she lived in a one-room top-floor apartment in Berlin-Hohenschönhausen. She worked on texts of her own, writing reviews for publishers on Russian dramas and on works of fiction. Soon she moved into a shared apartment with the author-poet Adolf Endler in the centre of Berlin "five floors up, with an outdoor toilet". They married in 1968. Her first published poems appeared in 1968. By this time she had relocated permanently to Berlin.

=== Writer and translator ===
In 1969 she undertook a lengthy visit to Georgia. Her first major pieces of translation, which appeared in 1974, were of texts by Marina Tsvetaeva. She produced poetry and prose works and further translations, notably of novels by Oleg Alexandrovitch Yuryev and poems by Olga Martynova. There were German-language adaptations, mostly from Russian texts, but also from English, Italian and Georgian ones. She worked as an editor-compiler, at one point, for instance, of the annual "Jahrbuch der Lyrik".

Elke Erb became, over the years, something of an inspiration and mentor for the Prenzlauer-Berg literary set. Her closeness to the evolving independent peace movement, her involvement in 1981 with an "unofficial" anthology of lyric poetry and her protests (with others) in 1983 against the deprivation of citizenship of the young civil rights activist Roland Jahn all combined to make her a focus for Stasi surveillance. There was an attempt by the national executive of the (East) German Writers' Association under the chairmanship of Hermann Kant to exclude her from membership or at least to restrict her travel privileges, which would have severely restricted her ability to earn a living by writing, but the exclusion was never carried through by her local Berlin branch.

== Published output (selection) ==
=== Poetry and prose ===
- Gutachten. Poesie und Prosa. Aufbau Verlag, Berlin, Weimar 1975
- Einer schreit: Nicht! Geschichten und Gedichte. Wagenbach, Berlin 1976
- Der Faden der Geduld. Aufbau Verlag, Berlin, Weimar 1978.
- Trost. Gedichte und Prosa. Deutsche Verlagsanstalt, Stuttgart 1982 (ausgewählt von Sarah Kirsch)
- Vexierbild. Aufbau Verlag, Berlin, Weimar 1983.
- Kastanienallee. Texte und Kommentare. Aufbau Verlag, Berlin, Weimar 1987.
- Winkelzüge oder Nicht vermutete, aufschlußreiche Verhältnisse. (Illustrationen: Angela Hampel) Druckhaus Galrev, Berlin 1991
- Nachts, halb zwei, zu Hause. Texte aus drei Jahrzehnten. Reclam Leipzig, Leipzig 1991 (ausgewählt von Brigitte Struzyk)
- Poets Corner 3: Elke Erb, Unabhängige Verlagsbuchhandlung Ackerstraße, Berlin 1991.
- Unschuld, du Licht meiner Augen. Gedichte, Steidl Verlag, Göttingen 1994
- Der wilde Forst, der tiefe Wald. Auskünfte in Prosa, Steidl Verlag, Göttingen 1995.
- Mensch sein, nicht. Gedichte und andere Tagebuchnotizen. Urs Engeler, Basel und Weil am Rhein 1998
- Leibhaftig lesen. Gedichte, Verlag Ulrich Keicher, Warmbronn 1999
- Sachverstand. Werkbuch, Gedichte, Urs Engeler Editor, Basel und Weil am Rhein 2000.
- Lust. 2 Gedichte. Verlag Ulrich Keicher, Warmbronn 2001.
- Parabel. Verlag Unartig 2002.
- die crux. Gedichte, Urs Engeler Editor, Basel und Weil am Rhein 2003.
- Gänsesommer. Gedichte, Urs Engeler Editor, Basel und Weil am Rhein 2005.
- Freunde hin, Freunde her. Gedichte (= Lyrikedition 2000). BUCH&media, München 2005, ISBN 978-3-86520-154-6.
- Sonanz. 5-Minuten-Notate. Gedichte, Urs Engeler Editor, Basel und Weil am Rhein 2008.
- Wegerich. Wahn. Denn Wieso? Gedichte (aus Sonanz), Verlag Ulrich Keicher, Warmbronn 2008.
- Meins. Gedichte, roughbooks, Wuischke, Berlin und Holderbank 2010
- Elke Erb. (= Poesiealbum. 301). Märkischer Verlag Wilhelmshorst 2012, ISBN 978-3-943708-01-1.
- Das Hündle kam weiter auf drein. Gedichte, roughbooks, Berlin, Wuischke und Solothurn 2013.
- Sonnenklar. Gedichte, roughbooks, Berlin, Wuischke und Solothurn 2015.

=== Audio-book ===
- in: Dichtung des 20. Jahrhunderts: Meine 24 sächsischen Dichter. Hrsg. Gerhard Pötzsch, 2 CDs, Militzke Verlag, Leipzig 2009, ISBN 978-3-86189-935-8.

=== Translations ===
- Oleg Jurjew: Halbinsel Judatin, Roman. Vom Autor neugeordnete u. durchges. Fassung. Aus dem Russ. von Elke Erb unter Mitw. von Sergej Gladkich. Verlag Jung & Jung, Salzburg 2014, ISBN 978-3-99027-053-0.

== Personal life and death ==
Erb was married to Adolf Endler between 1968 and 1978. Their son, the writer-musician Konrad Endler, was born in 1971.

Elke Erb died on 22 January 2024, at the age of 85.

== Awards and prizes ==
- 1988 Peter Huchel Prize for Kastanienallee
- 1990 Heinrich Mann Prize (jointly with Adolf Endler)
- 1993 Ehrengabe der Schillerstiftung (Honorary award of the Schiller Foundation)
- 1994 Rahel Varnhagen von Ense Medal
- 1995 Erich Fried Prize
- 1995 Honoured guest of the Villa Massimo in Rome
- 1995 Ida Dehmel Literature Prize
- 1999 Norbert Conrad Kaser Prize for Lyric Poetry
- 1999 F.-C. Weiskopf Prize of the Berlin Academy of Arts
- 2002 Stipendium beneficiary of the Künstlerhaus Edenkoben
- 2007 Hans Erich Nossack prize for her overall output
- 2011 Prize of the Literature Houses (Preis der Literaturhäuser)
- 2011 Erlangen Literature Prize for Translated Poetry
- 2012 Roswitha Prize
- 2012 Georg Trakl Prize for Lyric Poetry
- 2013 Ernst Jandl Prize
- 2014 Anke Bennholdt Thomsen Prize for Lyric Poetry from the German Schiller Foundation
- 2016 Liliencron Docenture for Lyric Poetry
- 2018 Mörike Prize from the Town of Fellbach
- 2019: Bundesverdienstkreuz
- 2020: Georg Büchner Prize
