= Anja Utler =

German poet, essayist and translator

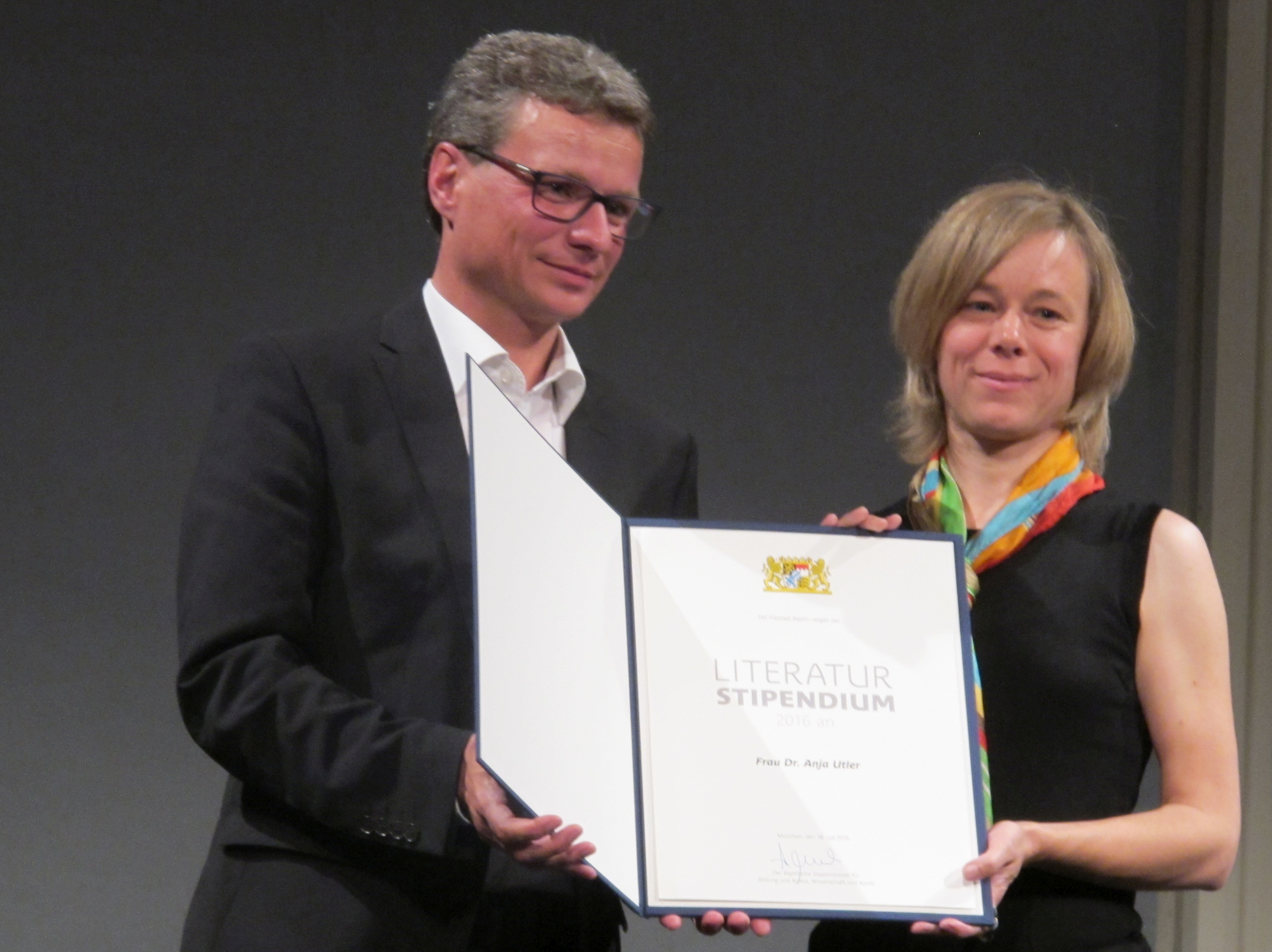
Bernd Sibler, Bavarian Minister of State for science and the arts, presents the certificate of the literature scholarship of the Free State of Bavaria to Utler in 2016.

Anja Utler (born 24 July 1973 in Schwandorf, Germany) is a German poet, essayist and translator.

== Life and work ==
Utler studied Slavic studies, English studies and speech science. In 2003, she received a doctor's degree from the university of Regensburg. Her doctoral thesis dealt with the relevance of gender in the work of four Russian women poets (Zinaida Gippius, Elena Guro, Anna Akhmatowa and Marina Tsvetaeva).

In 2004, she published her debut poetry collection münden – entzüngeln (engulf-enkindle), which had been awarded the Leonce-und-Lena-Preis the year before. Utler's work is focusing on text in relation to writing and sound. In 2006, Utler published brinnen as both a book and an audio CD with two routes running through the text. In 2009, the collection jana, vermacht was published as a book containing an acoustic text installation.

In 2007, the Austrian national public broadcaster ORF broadcast her audio play suchrufen, taub (search calling, deaf) which was granted the advancement award of the Karl Sczuka Prize for Works of Radio Art in 2008.

In 2014, Utler was a fellow of the International Writing Program in Iowa. In 2015, she was Writer-in-Residence at the Oberlin College, Ohio. In 2019, she participated in the 29th Medellín International Poetry Festival.

Utler is a member of the German Academy for Language and Literature and a co-founder of the PEN Berlin. In 2022, she gained a fellowship of the Hamburg based think tank The New Institute.

Utler lives in Leipzig.

== Selected honours ==
- 2001: Literature Fellowship of the Insel Hombroich foundation
- 2003: Leonce-und-Lena-Preis
- 2005: Advancement award of the Horst Bienek Prize for Poetry
- 2006: Advancement award of the Deutsche Schillerstiftung
- 2008: Advancement award of the Karl Sczuka Prize for Works of Radio Art
- 2009: Bavarian Award for the Advancement of the Arts (literature category)
- 2010: Advancement award of the Heimrad Bäcker Prize
- 2012: engulf-enkindle, the translation of münden – entzüngeln by Kurt Beals, is nominated for the Best Translated Book Award for poetry
- 2014: Basel Poetry Prize
- 2016: Heimrad Bäcker Prize
- 2016: Literature scholarship of the Free State of Bavaria
- 2018: Thomas Kling Poetry Lectureship
- 2020: South Palatinate poetry prize
- 2021: Ernst-Meister-Preis für Lyrik of the city of Hagen
- 2023: Ernst Jandl Prize
- 2024: Peter Huchel Prize

== Selected publications ==
=== Independent publications ===
- aufsagen. Bunte Raben Verlag, Lintig-Meckelstedt 1999.
- münden – entzüngeln. Edition Korrespondenzen, Wien 2004, ISBN 3-902113-10-3.
- brinnen. Edition Korrespondenzen, Wien 2006, ISBN 3-902113-48-0.
- brinnen, CD, Two exemplary text routes through the collention 'brinnen', read out by the author herself. ISBN 978-3-902113-86-3.
- plötzlicher mohn. Münchner Reden zur Poesie. Stiftung Lyrik Kabinett, München 2007, ISBN 978-3-938776-14-8.
- jana, vermacht. Edition Korrespondenzen, Wien 2009. Buch mit CD. ISBN 978-3-902113-62-7.
- ausgeübt. Eine Kurskorrektur. Edition Korrespondenzen, Wien 2011, ISBN 978-3-902113-77-1.
- kommen sehen. Lobgesang. Edition Korrespondenzen, Wien 2020, ISBN 978-3-902951-52-6.
- Es beginnt. Trauerrefrain. Edition Korrespondenzen, Wien 2023, ISBN 978-3-902951-77-9.

=== Essays and theoretical writings ===
- "manchmal sehr mitreißend". Über die poetische Erfahrung gesprochener Gedichte. Transcript, Bielefeld 2016, ISBN 978-3-8376-3357-3.
- Von den Knochen der Sanftheit: Behauptungen, Reden, Quergänge. Edition Korrespondenzen, Wien 2016, ISBN 978-3-902951-18-2.

=== Translations ===
- Mila Haugová. Schlaflied wilder Tiere. Gedichte. In collaboration with Mila Haugová. Edition Korrespondenzen, Wien 2011, ISBN 978-3-902113-80-1.
- Anne Carson. Decreation. Gedichte, Oper, Essays. S. Fischer Verlag, Frankfurt am Main 2014, ISBN 978-3-10-010243-0.
- Anne Carson. Rot. Zwei Romane in Versen. S. Fischer Verlag, Frankfurt am Main 2019, ISBN 978-3-10-397279-5.

=== Scientific publications ===
- Märchen und Weiblichkeit, Ljudmila Petrushevskajas Kunstmärchen und das russische Volksmärchen. Regensburger Skripten zur Literaturwissenschaft, Regensburg 2000.
- "Weibliche Antworten" auf "menschliche Fragen"? Zur Kategorie Geschlecht in der russischen Lyrik (Z. Gippius, E. Guro, A. Achmatova, M. Cvetaeva) Dissertation, Regensburg, 2004.

=== Miscellaneous publications ===
- Dokumentation der Textinstallation all present is perfect aus jana, vermacht in six memos for the next... Ed. by Jörg van den Berg et al., Verlag für moderne Kunst, Wien 2016.
- Counter Position (International Poetry Nights in Hong Kong Series). The Chinese University Press, Hong Kong 2018. ISBN 978-988-237-047-0.

== Secondary source ==
- Kurt Beals (2009-07-22), "Play for Two Voices: On Translating the Poetry of Anja Utler", TranscUlturAl: A Journal of Translation and Cultural Studies, vol. 1, no. 2, p. 68, doi:10.21992/T9X63V, ISSN 1920-0323
- Claudia Hillebrandt (2023), "Zwischen Tintenstimme und Lobgesang. Klangformen des Vegetabilen bei Marcel Beyer und Anja Utler", in Yvonne Al-Taie, Evelyn Dueck (ed.), Blütenlesen. Poetiken des Vegetabilen in der Gegenwartslyrik, Kontemporär. Schriften zur deutschsprachigen Gegenwartsliteratur, 16, vol. 16, Berlin, Heidelberg: Springer, pp. 171–187, doi:10.1007/978-3-662-67708-7_10, ISBN 978-3-662-67707-0
