= Ernst Jandl Prize =

Austrian literary awards

The Ernst Jandl Prize is a literary award established by the Austrian Ministry for Arts, Culture, the Civil Service and Sport in memory of the poet Ernst Jandl. The international poetry prize for German-speaking writers is awarded every two years and presented during the Poetry Days in Neuberg an der Mürz. The award is endowed with 15,000 euros.

== Recipients ==
- 2001: Thomas Kling
- 2003: Felix Philipp Ingold
- 2005: Michael Donhauser
- 2007: Paul Wühr
- 2009: Ferdinand Schmatz
- 2011: Peter Waterhouse
- 2013: Elke Erb
- 2015: Franz Josef Czernin
- 2017: Monika Rinck
- 2019: Oswald Egger
- 2021: Brigitta Falkner
- 2023: Anja Utler
- 2025: Ulf Stolterfoht
