= Erich Fried Prize =

Literary Award

The Erich Fried Prize (German: Erich-Fried-Preis) is a literary prize in honour of the Austrian poet Erich Fried, and is awarded annually by the International Erich Fried Society for Literature and Language, based in Vienna. The value of the prize, endowed by the office of the Chancellor of Austria, is 15,000 euros. Each year the trustees of the Erich Fried Society select a juror, who nominates the winner of the prize for that year.

== Jurors and Recipients ==
| Year | Juror | Recipient |
|---|---|---|
| 1990 | Hans Mayer | Christoph Hein |
| 1991 | Ernst Jandl | Bodo Hell |
| 1992 | Christa Wolf | Paul Parin |
| 1993 | Walter Jens | Robert Schindel |
| 1994 | Adolf Muschg | Jörg Steiner |
| 1995 | Friederike Mayröcker | Elke Erb |
| 1996 | György Konrád | Paul Nizon |
| 1997 | Ilse Aichinger | Gert Jonke |
| 1998 | Volker Braun | Bert Papenfuß |
| 1999 | Elfriede Jelinek | Elfriede Gerstl |
| 2000 | György Dalos | Klaus Schlesinger |
| 2001 | Brigitte Kronauer | Otto A. Böhmer |
| 2002 | Christina Weiss | Oskar Pastior |
| 2003 | Robert Schindel | Robert Menasse |
| 2004 | Wilhelm Genazino | Brigitte Oleschinski |
| 2005 | Christoph Ransmayr | Yaak Karsunke |
| 2006 | Michael Krüger | Marcel Beyer |
| 2007 | Ilma Rakusa | Peter Waterhouse |
| 2008 | Katja Lange-Müller | Alois Hotschnig |
| 2009 | Josef Winkler | Esther Dischereit |
| 2010 | Urs Widmer | Terézia Mora |
| 2011 | Barbara Frischmuth | Thomas Stangl |
| 2012 | Lutz Seiler | Nico Bleutge |
| 2013 | Kathrin Röggla | Rainer Merkel |
| 2014 | Monika Maron | Judith Hermann |
| 2015 | Reto Hänny | Dorothee Elmiger |
| 2016 | Eva Menasse | Leif Randt |
| 2017 | Franz Schuh | Teresa Präauer |
| 2018 | Beatrice von Matt | Ralph Dutli |
| 2019 | Christoph Hein | Steffen Mensching |
| 2020 | Maja Haderlap | Esther Kinsky |
| 2021 | Ingo Schulze | Frank Witzel |
| 2022 | Klaus Merz | Melinda Nadj Abonji |
| 2023 | Monika Helfer | Thomas Kunst |
| 2024 | Ulf Stolterfoht | Urs Allemann |
| 2025 | Fatma Aydemir | Cemile Sahin |
| 2026 | Daniela Seel | Fiston Mwanza Mujila |

== See also ==
- German literature
- List of literary awards
- List of poetry awards
