= Peter Huchel Prize =

Peter Huchel Prize is a literature prize awarded in Baden-Württemberg, Germany. The Peter Huchel Prize for German-language poetry, donated by the state of Baden-Württemberg and Südwestrundfunk, has been awarded since 1983 for an outstanding lyric work of the previous year. The award is endowed with €15,000 and is presented annually on 3 April, Peter Huchel's birthday, in Staufen im Breisgau.

== Winners ==
- 1984 Manfred Peter Hein, Gegenzeichnung
- 1985 Guntram Vesper, Die Inseln im Landmeer und neue Gedichte
- 1986 Michael Krüger, Die Dronte
- 1987 Wulf Kirsten, Die Erde bei Meißen
- 1988 Elke Erb, Kastanienallee
- 1989 Luise Schmidt, Die Finsternis die freie Existenz
- 1990 Ernst Jandl, Idyllen
- 1991 Günter Herburger, Das brennende Haus
- 1992 Ludwig Greve (posthum), Sie lacht und andere Gedichte
- 1993 Sarah Kirsch, Erlkönigs Tochter
- 1994 Jürgen Becker, Foxtrott im Erfurter Stadion
- 1995 Durs Grünbein, Falten und Fallen
- 1996 Gregor Laschen, Jammerbugt-Notate
- 1997 Thomas Kling, morsch
- 1998 Brigitte Oleschinski, Your Passport is Not Guilty
- 1999 Raoul Schrott, Tropen. Über das Erhabene
- 2000 Adolf Endler, Der Pudding der Apokalypse
- 2001 Oskar Pastior, Villanella & Pantum
- 2002 Wolfgang Hilbig, Bilder vom Erzählen
- 2003 Rolf Haufs, Ebene der Fluß
- 2004 Hans Thill, Kühle Religionen
- 2005 Nicolas Born (posthum), Gedichte
- 2006 Uljana Wolf, kochanie ich habe brot gekauft
- 2007 Oswald Egger, Tag und Nacht sind zwei Jahre
- 2008 Ulf Stolterfoht, holzrauch über heslach
- 2009 Gerhard Falkner, Hölderlin Reparatur
- 2010 Friederike Mayröcker, dieses Jäckchen (nämlich) des Vogel Greif
- 2011 Marion Poschmann, Geistersehen
- 2012 Nora Bossong, Sommer vor den Mauern
- 2013 Monika Rinck, Honigprotokolle
- 2014 Steffen Popp, Dickicht mit Reden und Augen
- 2015 Paulus Böhmer, Zum Wasser will alles Wasser will weg
- 2016 Barbara Köhler, Istanbul, zusehends
- 2017 Orsolya Kalász, Das Eine
- 2018 Farhad Showghi, Wolkenflug spielt Zerreißprobe
- 2019 Thilo Krause, Was wir reden, wenn es gewittert
- 2020 Henning Ziebritzki, Vogelwerk
- 2021 Marcel Beyer, Dämonenräumdienst
- 2022 Dinçer Güçyeter, Mein Prinz, ich bin das Ghetto
- 2023 Judith Zander, im ländchen sommer im winter zur see
- 2024 Anja Utler, Es beginnt. Trauerrefrain
- 2025 Olga Martynova, Such nach dem Namen des Windes
- 2026 Nadja Küchenmeister, Der Große Wagen
