= Küchenmeister =

Küchenmeister (lit. 'kitchen master') is a German surname. Notable people with this surname include:

- Claus Küchenmeister (1930–2014), German author
- Dieter Küchenmeister (1935–2011), Austrian curler and sports executive
- Friedrich Küchenmeister (1821–1890), German physician
- Nadja Küchenmeister (born 1981), German poet and writer
- Walter Küchenmeister (1897–1943), member of the anti-fascist resistance group Red Orchestra
- Wera Küchenmeister (1929–2013), German author
