= Ernst-Meister-Preis für Lyrik =

German literary award

Ernst-Meister-Preis für Lyrik (Ernst Meister Prize for Poetry) is a literary prize of Germany. The prize is endowed with €5,000. The Ernst Meister Prize was founded in 1981 in memory of the Hagen poet and writer Ernst Meister and has been awarded at irregular intervals. Since 2021, the award will be organized every three years by the New Ernst Meister Society for the city of Hagen. The prize honors "the work of authors who express their responsibility for language and poetry in a special way".

== Recipients ==
- 1981 Christoph Meckel
- 1986 Oskar Pastior
- 1990 Paul Wühr
- 1994 Michael Krüger
- 2001 Brigitte Oleschinski (main prize, HP), Jochen Winter (HP), Jürgen Wiersch (Allgemeiner Förderpreis, AF), Helwig Brunner (AF), Sabine Scho (AF)
- 2003 Lutz Seiler (HP), Ulf Stolterfoht (Westfälischer Förderpreis, WF), Hendrik Rost (AF)
- 2005 Jan Wagner (HP), Nicolai Kobus (WF), Andreas Münzner (AF)
- 2008 Monika Rinck (HP), Ulrike Almut Sandig (AF), Mirko Bonné (WF)
- 2011 Marion Poschmann (HP), Jan Skudlarek, Münster (WF) Daniela Seel, Berlin (AF)
- 2018 Barbara Köhler
- 2021 Anja Utler
- 2024 Uljana Wolf
