= Brigitte Oleschinski =

German political scientist and poet

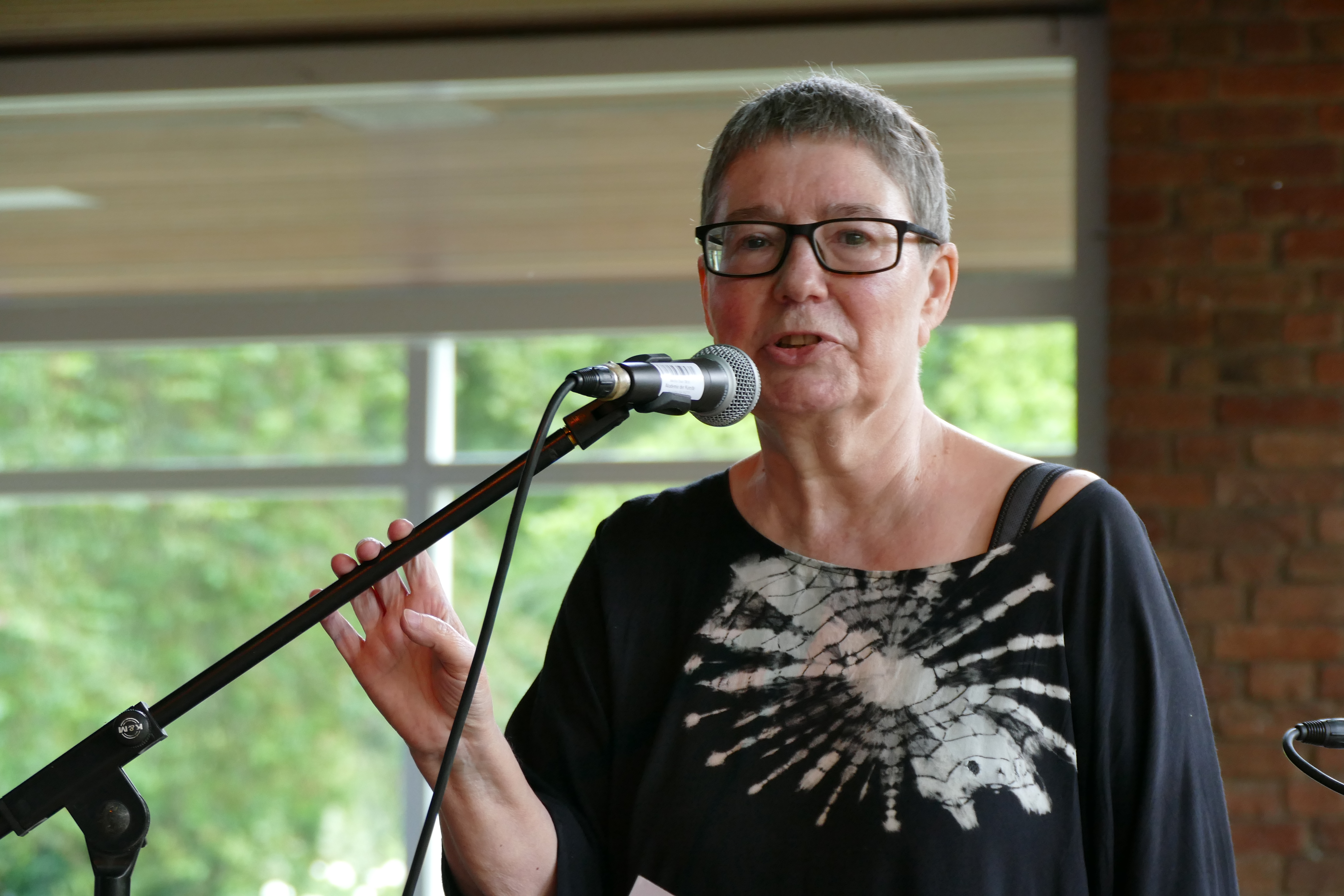
- Oleschinski at a poetry festival in Berlin, 2023
- Born: 1955 (age 70–71); Cologne, North Rhine-Westphalia, West Germany
- Education: Political science
- Alma mater: Free University of Berlin
- Writing career
- Notable awards: Bremen Literature Prize; Peter Huchel Prize; Erich Fried Prize

Academic work
- Institutions: German Resistance Memorial Center

Brigitte Oleschinski (born August 10, 1955, in Cologne) is a German political scientist and poet.

== Life ==
Oleschinski studied political science at the Free University of Berlin. In 1993 she received her doctorate in philosophy with a thesis on the history of prison chaplaincy in the Weimar Republic and the Third Reich. In 1990, she worked at the German Resistance Memorial Centre in Berlin. In 1992, she was one of the co-founders of the Erinnerungsort Torgau. Justizunrecht - Diktatur - Widerstand, for which she published and edited several historical essays. She now lives in Berlin.

In addition to her work as a contemporary historian, Oleschinski has been publishing poems and essays since 1990.

Angelika Overath described her in the Neue Zürcher Zeitung as "one of the important new voices in German-language poetry".

Oleschinski holds the view that the meanings and effects of poems do not arise from the intention of the writer, but arise individually in each recipient. Poems are, she believes, latent energies that are released by engaging with them.

Oleschinski has been a member of the PEN Centre Germany since 1998.

== Awards ==
Oleschinski has received awards for her lyrical work, including the Bremen Poetry Prize. 1998 the Bremen Literature Prize and the Peter Huchel Prize, 2001 the Ernst Meister Prize for Poetry and 2004 the Erich Fried Prize.

== Works ==
=== As author ===
- Mental heat control, Reinbek bei Hamburg 1990
- Mut zur Menschlichkeit. Der Gefängnisgeistliche Peter Buchholz im Dritten Reich, Königswinter 1991
- "Ein letzter stärkender Gottesdienst ...". Die deutsche Gefängnisseelsorge zwischen Republik und Diktatur 1918-1945, Berlin 1993 (Dissertation)
- Gedenkstätte Plötzensee, Berlin 1994 (PDF file; 3,84 MB)
- Die Schweizer Korrektur, Basel 1995 (together with Durs Grünbein and Peter Waterhouse)
- "Feindliche Elemente sind in Gewahrsam zu halten". Die sowjetischen Speziallager Nr. 8 und Nr. 10 in Torgau 1945-1948, Leipzig 1997 (together with Bert Pampel)
- Your passport is not guilty, Reinbek bei Hamburg 1997
- Reizstrom in Aspik, Cologne 2002
- Argo cargo, Heidelberg 2003
- Geisterströmung, Cologne 2004
- Rollrasen auf der Selbstfahrlafette. On three poems by Ron Winkler, in: BELLA triste, no. 17 (special issue on contemporary German-language poetry), Hildesheim 2007

=== As editor ===
- Das Torgau-Tabu, Leipzig 1993 (together with Norbert Haase)
- Torgau - ein Kriegsende in Europa, Bremen 1995 (together with Norbert Haase)

=== As translator ===
- Susan N. Kiguli: Home drifts in the distance. Poems, English-German, edited by Indra Wussow. Verlag Das Wunderhorn, Heidelberg 2012, ISBN 978-3-88423-404-4
