= Mörike-Preis der Stadt Fellbach =

German literary award

Mörike-Preis der Stadt Fellbach is a literature prize awarded in Baden-Württemberg, Germany. Since 1991, the City of Fellbach has awarded the prize in memory of the poet Eduard Mörike, who lived in Fellbach for some time in 1873. The prize money is €15,000.

The award is given to selected German-speaking poets and writers who seem worthy of being honored in the name of Eduard Mörike through the quality of their work. The jury, consisting of a representative of the German Literature Archive Marbach and a professor of literature at a German-speaking university, selects a trustee who is solely responsible for naming the laureate. The Mörike Prize includes a sponsorship award endowed with €3,000, which can also be awarded to foreign-language authors. The recipient of the sponsorship award is determined by the main prize winner. The award ceremony, which takes place in the spring, is associated with the Fellbach Literature Days, which deal with the work of the laureate, but also repeatedly with the works of Mörike. In the "Mörike Speech," the laureate sheds light on his view of the German lyric poet.

== Winners ==
FP – Förderpreis

- 1991 Wolf Biermann, FP: Utz Rachowski
- 1994 Sigrid Damm, FP: Róža Domašcyna
- 1997 W. G. Sebald, FP: Wolfgang Schlüter
- 2000 Robert Schindel, FP: Doron Rabinovici
- 2003 Brigitte Kronauer, FP: Elisabeth Binder
- 2006 Michael Krüger, FP: Andrzej Kopacki
- 2009 Ernst Augustin, FP: Sandra Hoffmann
- 2012 Jan Peter Bremer, FP: Konstantin Ames
- 2015 Jan Wagner, FP: Andre Rudolph
- 2018 Elke Erb, FP: Marie T. Martin
- 2021 Leif Randt, FP: Olivia Wenzel
- 2024 Jaroslav Rudiš, FP: Alice Horáčková
