= Adolf Endler =

German writer, essayist, and poet (1930–2009)

Adolf Endler (10 September 1930 – 2 August 2009) was a German writer. Endler challenged the socialist realist art movement of the German Democratic Republic and was active in the literary scene of Prenzlauer Berg, in East Berlin. In 2005, he became a member of the Deutsche Akademie für Sprache und Dichtung (German Academy for Language and Literature).

== Early life ==
Endler was born in Düsseldorf in 1930.

He moved to East Germany in 1955 and studied at the Johannes R. Becher-Institut für Literatur in Leipzig from 1955 to 1957.

== Career ==
He was an acclaimed poet popular in both the East and the West. At the same time, he was shunned by party functionaries because of his opposition to socialist realism. He defied the cultural directives of the state and communicated secretly with his peers.

Endler coined the term Sächsische Dichterschule (Saxon School of Poetry) to describe German writers born in the 1930s who were influential in poetry, such as Karl Mickel, Heinz Czechowski, Sarah Kirsch, and Volker Braun. British poet Michael Hamburger commended the group for their creativity in the hostile environment of East Germany at the time. Hamburger secretly recorded the correspondence between individual poets. Some of the correspondence was also documented by Erich Fried, a colleague of Endler's, in his review of "In diesem besseren Land" (In this better land).

Endler continued to be a controversial figure in East Germany into the 1970s. He was expelled from the Authors’ Association of the GDR in 1979, after declaring his solidarity with his previously reprimanded colleague Stefan Heym. Throughout the 1980s, he contributed to various Berlin and Leipzig underground magazines.

In the 1990s, Adolf Endler became known to a wider public through a volume of memoirs entitled Tarzan am Prenzlauer Berg (Tarzan at Prenzlauer Berg). From 1991 to 1998, with Brigitte Schreier, he organized the Orplid & Co. series of readings in Café Clara in Berlin-Mitte.

== Death ==
Endler died in August 2009, at the age of 78.

== Works ==
- Erwacht ohne Furcht, Gedichte 1960
- Weg in die Wische, Reportagen und Gedichte 1960
- Das Sandkorn, Gedichte, Mitteldeutscher Verlag 1974/1976
- Die Kinder der Nibelungen, Gedichte 1964
- In diesem besseren Land, Lyrik-Anthologie gemeinsam mit Karl Mickel 1966
- Nackt mit Brille, Gedichte 1975
- Zwei Versuche, über Georgien zu erzählen, Reisebericht 1976
- Verwirrte klare Botschaften, Gedichte 1979
- Nadelkissen, Prosa 1980
- Akte Endler, Gedichte aus 30 Jahren 1981/1988
- Tarzan am Prenzlauer Berg, Tagebuch 1984
- Ohne Nennung von Gründen, Prosa 1985
- Schichtenflotz, Prosa 1987
- Nächtlicher Besucher, in seine Schranken gewiesen. Eine Fortsetzungszüchtigung, Berliner Handpresse, Berlin 1989. Wallstein, Göttingen 2008, ISBN 978-3-8353-0331-7
- Vorbildlich schleimlösend, Prosa 1990
- Den Tiger reiten, Essays 1990
- Die Antwort des Poeten, Roman 1992
- Tarzan am Prenzlauer Berg. Sudelblätter 1981–1993, Reclam Leipzig, Leipzig 1994, ISBN 3-379-01565-2
- Warnung vor Utah, Reisebuch 1996
- Der Pudding der Apokalypse. Gedichte 1963–1998, Suhrkamp, Frankfurt/Main 1999, ISBN 3-518-41056-3
- Trotzes halber, Gedichte 1999
- Das Greisenalter, voilà 2001
- Schweigen Schreiben Reden Schweigen. Reden 1995–2001, Suhrkamp, Frankfurt/Main 2003, ISBN 3-518-12299-1
- Uns überholte der Zugvögelzug. Alte und neue Gedichte, UN ART IG, Aschersleben 2004, ISBN 3-9808479-8-5
- Nebbich. Eine deutsche Karriere, Wallstein, Göttingen 2005, ISBN 3-89244-839-6
- Krähenüberkrächzte Rolltreppe. Neunundsiebzig kurze Gedichte aus einem halben Jahrhundert, Wallstein, Göttingen 2007 ISBN 978-3-8353-0165-8
- Nächtlicher Besucher, in seine Schranken gewiesen. Eine Fortsetzungs-Züchtigung, Wallstein, Göttingen 2008, ISBN 3-8353-0331-7 (editierte Neuauflage)

== Literary awards ==
- 1978: Förderpreis Literatur zum Kunstpreis from the Academy of Arts, Berlin
- 1990: Heinrich-Mann-Preis from the Akademie der Künste der DDR – co-winner with Elke Erb
- 1994: Brandenburgischer Literaturpreis
- 1995: Kritikerpreis from the SWF-Bestenliste
- 1995: Brothers Grimm Prize of the City of Hanau
- 1996: Rahel Varnhagen von Ense-Medaille Stiftung Preußischer Seehandlung – co-winner with Brigitte Schreier-Endler
- 1998: Otto Braun-Ehrengabe from the Deutsche Schillerstiftung
- 2000: Peter Huchel Prize
- 2000: Literaturpreis der Stadt Bremen
- 2001: Order of Merit of the Federal Republic of Germany 1st Class
- 2003: Hans-Erich Nossack Prize
- 2008: Rainer Malkowski Prize – co-winner with Kurt Drawert
