= Franz Josef Czernin =

Austrian writer

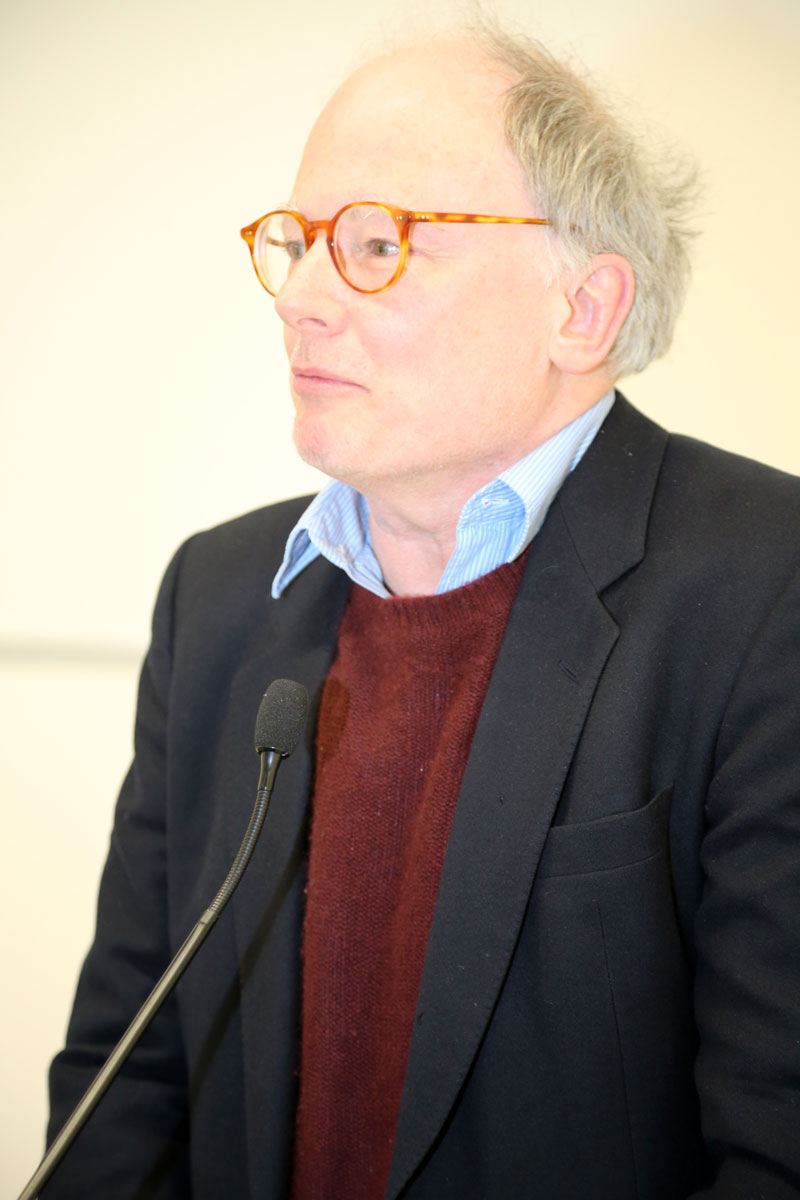
Franz Josef Czernin

Franz Josef Czernin (born 7 January 1952, Vienna) is an Austrian writer. He is a member of the Bohemian noble Czernin family.

== Awards and honors ==
- 1993: Stadtschreiber von Graz
- 1997: Literaturpreis der Stadt Wien
- 1998: Anton-Wildgans-Preis
- 1998: Heimito von Doderer-Literaturpreis, Sonderpreis für Literarische Essayistik
- 2003: Heimrad-Bäcker-Preis
- 2004: Literaturpreis des Landes Steiermark
- 2007: Georg-Trakl-Preis
- 2007: Österreichischer Staatspreis für Literaturkritik
- 2011: Magus-Preis der Gesellschaft zur Förderung der westfälischen Kulturarbeit
- 2012: H. C. Artmann-Preis
- 2015: Ernst Jandl Prize
