= Marion Poschmann =

German author, novelist, and poet

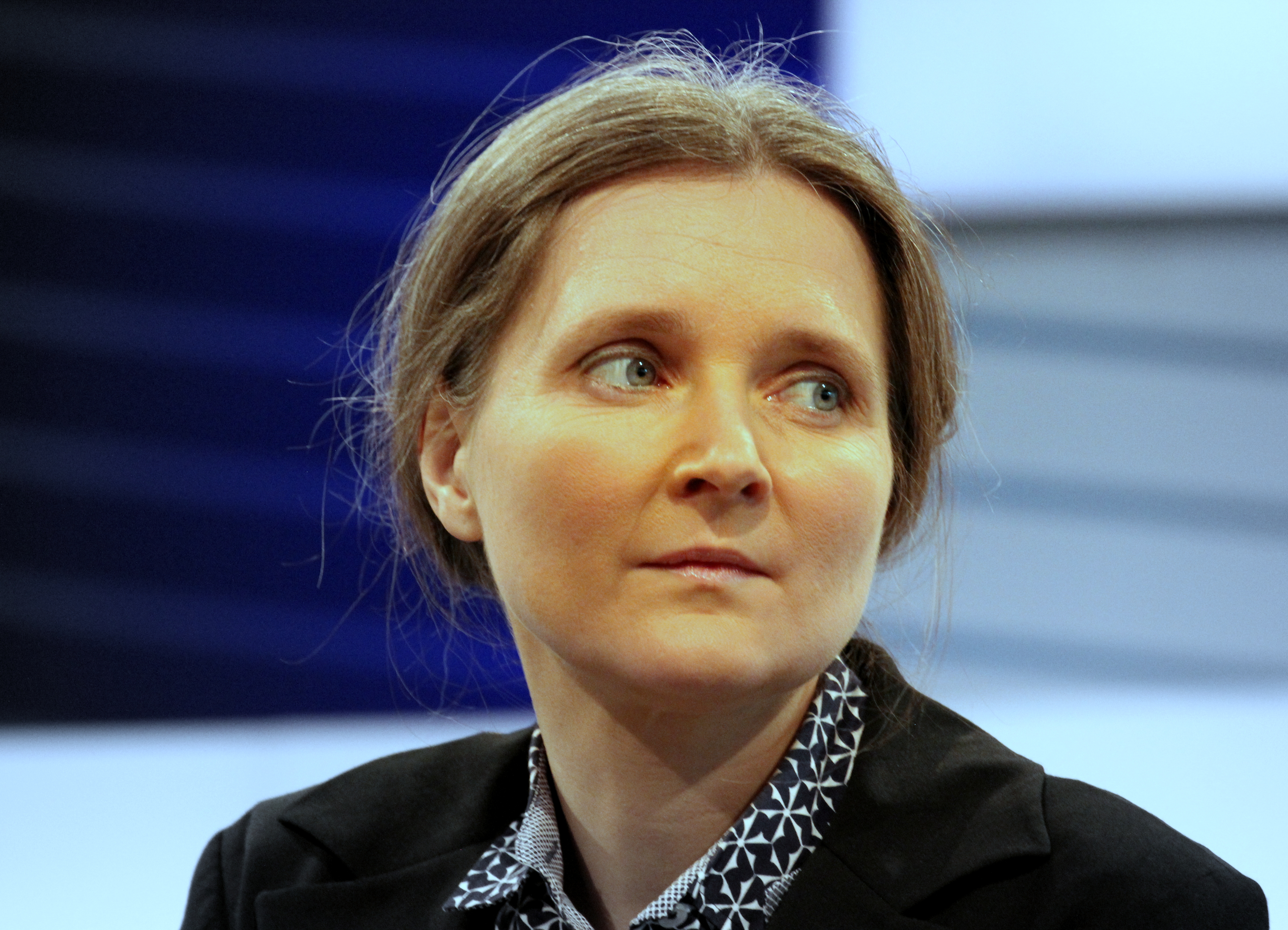
Marion Poschmann in 2017

Marion Poschmann (born 15 December 1969 in Essen) is a German author, novelist, and poet.

== Life ==
Marion Poschmann grew up in Mülheim an der Ruhr and Essen. From 1989 to 1995, she studied German, philosophy, and Slavic studies in Bonn and Berlin. Her novel The Pine Islands was shortlisted for the Man Booker International Prize in 2019.

== Selected works ==
- Baden bei Gewitter. Frankfurter Verlags-Anstalt, Frankfurt am Main 2002, ISBN 3-627-00089-7.
- Verschlossene Kammern. zu Klampen, Lüneburg 2002, ISBN 3-933156-76-9.
- Grund zu Schafen. Frankfurter Verlags-Anstalt, Frankfurt am Main 2004, ISBN 978-3-627-00117-9.
- Schwarzweißroman. Frankfurter Verlags-Anstalt, Frankfurt am Main 2005, ISBN 978-3-627-00124-7.
- Hundenovelle. Frankfurter Verlags-Anstalt, Frankfurt am Main 2008, ISBN 978-3-627-00149-0.
- Geistersehen. Suhrkamp, Berlin 2010, ISBN 978-3-518-42129-1.
- Die Sonnenposition. Suhrkamp, Berlin 2013, ISBN 978-3-518-42401-8.
- Mondbetrachtung in mondloser Nacht. Über Dichtung. Suhrkamp, Berlin 2016, ISBN 978-3-518-46666-7.
- Geliehene Landschaften. Lehrgedichte und Elegien. Suhrkamp, Berlin 2016, ISBN 978-3-518-42522-0.
- Die Kieferninseln. Suhrkamp, Berlin 2017, ISBN 978-3-518-42760-6.
  - English-language edition: The Pine Islands. Translated by Jen Calleja. Serpent's Tail, London 2019, ISBN 978-1-788-16091-9.
- Chor der Erinnyen. Roman. Suhrkamp, Berlin 2023, ISBN 978-3-518-43141-2.
- Die Winterschwimmerin. Suhrkamp, Berlin 2025, ISBN 978-3-518-43235-8.

== Awards ==
- 2003 Wolfgang Weyrauch Promotional Prize
- 2004 scholarship from the German Academy Rome Villa Massimo
- 2005 Hans-Erich-Nossack-Förderpreis
- 2005 Literature Prize Ruhr area
- 2005 Nominated for the German Book Prize (long list)
- 2006 Literature Prize of the City of Meersburg
- 2007 sponsorship award from the state of North Rhine-Westphalia
- 2009 Art Prize for Literature from the Brandenburg Lotto GmbH
- 2011 Peter Huchel Prize
- 2011 Ernst Meister Prize
- 2012 New York grant from the German Literature Fund
- 2013 Nominated for the German Book Prize (shortlist)
- 2013 Wilhelm Raabe Literature Prize
- 2015 Thomas Kling Poetics Lectureship
- 2016 Nominated for the Leipzig Book Fair Prize
- 2017 German Prize for Nature Writing
- 2017 Düsseldorf Literature Prize
- 2017 Nominated for the German Book Prize (shortlist)
- 2018 Berlin Literature Prize, combined with the guest professorship for German-language poetics at the Free University of Berlin
- 2018 Klopstock Prize for New Literature
- 2019 Nominated for the Man Booker International Prize (Shortlisted) for The Pine Islands
- 2019 Zurich Poetics Lecture
- 2020 Liliencron lectureship for poetry
- 2020 Poetry Prize Orphil
- 2020 Hölty Prize for Poetry
- 2021 Bremen Literature Prize
- 2021 Word Requests Literature Prize for critical short texts
- 2022/2023 Stadtschreiber von Bergen
- 2023 Joseph-Breitbach-Preis
