= Ulf Stolterfoht =

German writer

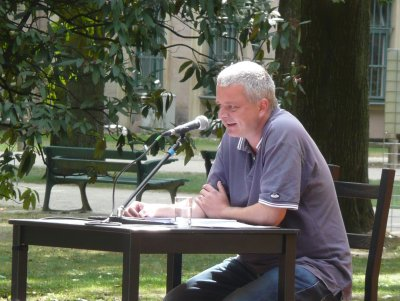
Ulf Stolterfoht at a reading at the Erlanger Poetenfest (Erlangen poets' festival) 2009

Ulf Stolterfoht (born 8 June 1963 in Stuttgart) is a German writer.

== Life and work ==
Ulf Stolterfoht opted out of military service and performed civilian service instead, after which he studied German and Linguistics in Bochum und Tübingen. Stolterfoht writes language-critical lyric poetry and essays which have been published in many anthologies (e.g. Der Große Conrady) and literary magazines. His first publication was the poetry volume "fachsprachen I-IX" ('specialist languages I-IX') which appeared in 1998 published by Urs Engeler Editor. In 2005, his translation of Gertrude Stein's "Winning His Way" appeared. From 2008 to 2009, he was visiting professor in the German Institute of Literature in Leipzig. Since 2014 he has been a member of the Deutsche Akademie für Sprache und Dichtung in Darmstadt.

Ulf Stolterfoht lives in Berlin.

== Titles ==
- handapparat heslach: Quellen und Materialien. roughbooks (2011)
- ammengespräche. roughbooks (2010)
- Frauen-Liebe und Leben. Variations on Adelbert von Chamisso together with Sabine Scho. hochroth Verlag (2010)
- das nomentano-manifest (2009)
- fachsprachen XXVIII-XXXVI. Gedichte. Urs Engeler Editor (2009)
- holzrauch über heslach. Gedichte. Urs Engeler Editor (2007)
- traktat vom widergang. Gedichte. Verlag Peter Engstler (2005)
- fachsprachen XIX-XXVII. Gedichte. Urs Engeler Editor (2004)
- fachsprachen X-XVIII. Gedichte. Urs Engeler Editor (2002)
- fachsprachen I-IX. Gedichte. Urs Engeler Editor (1998)

== Edited works (selection) ==
- cowboy-lyrik. roughbooks (2009)
- Jahrbuch der Lyrik 2008, with Christoph Buchwald (2008)
- Zwischen den Zeilen. Zeitschrift für Gedichte und ihre Poetik, Heft 21 (2003)

== Translations ==
- J. H. Prynne, Gedichte (2007) (together with Hans Thill)
- Gertrude Stein, Winning His Way / wie man seine art gewinnt (2005)

== Awards and prizes (selection) ==
- 2000 Sponsorship award Hans-Erich-Nossack-Preis
- 2001 Christine-Lavant-Preis
- 2003 Ernst-Meister-Preis
- 2004 Heimrad-Bäcker-Förderpreis
- 2005 Anna Seghers-Preis
- 2006 Alfred Gruber Prize at the Merano Poetry Prize
- 2007 Grant from Villa Massimo
- 2008 Peter Huchel Prize
- 2009 Erlanger Literatary Prize for poetry in translation together with Barbara Köhler
- 2011 Heimrad-Bäcker-Preis
- 2015: Ten-week London scholarship from the German Literature Fund, as Writer-in-Residence at Queen Mary University of London (autumn 2016)
- 2025 Ernst Jandl Prize
