= Nora Bossong =

German poet and writer (born 1982)

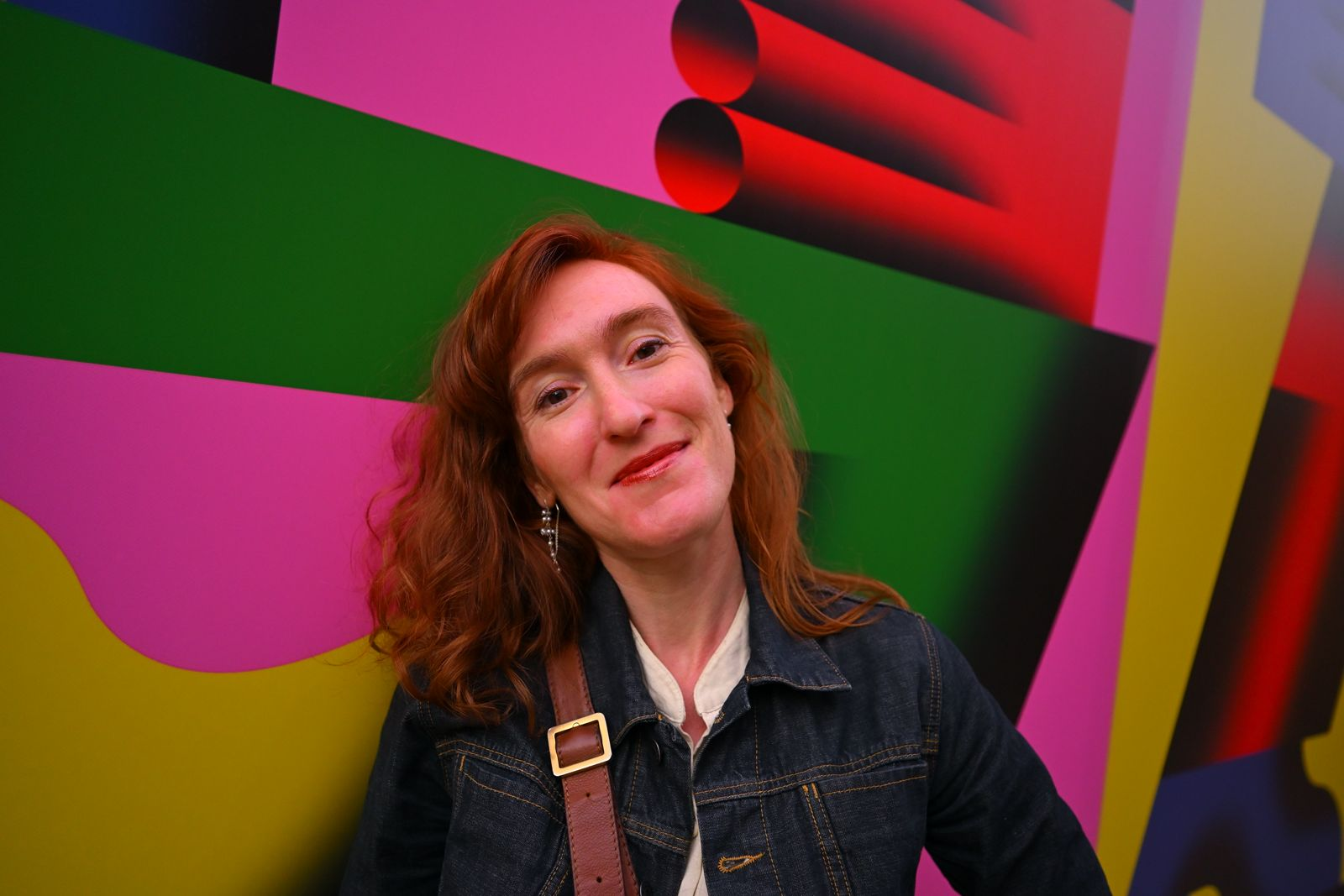
- Nora Bossong (2025)
- Born: 9 January 1982 (age 44); Bremen, Germany
- Occupations: Novelist, poet
- Writing career
- Language: German
- Genres: poetry, essay, novel
- Notable awards: Thomas Mann Prize, Peter Huchel Prize, Joseph-Breitbach-Preis

Nora Bossong (born 9 January 1982) is a German poet and writer. She lives in Berlin.

== Career ==
Bossong studied literature at the German Institute for Literature, as well as cultural studies, philosophy and comparative literature at the Humboldt University of Berlin, the University of Potsdam, and the Sapienza University of Rome. She was a 2001 Fellow of the first Wolfenbüttel literature laboratory.

Bossong's poetry and prose have been published in individual newspapers, anthologies and literary journals. In 2006, she published her debut novel. In 2022, she published a non-fiction book about her generation, Die Geschmeidigen: Meine Generation und der neue Ernst des Lebens (The Smooth Ones: My generation and life's new seriousness).

An advocate for democracy, peace and human rights, Bossong was also a member of the presidium of the PEN Centre Germany for two years.

== Awards (selection) ==
- 2001 – Young Authors meeting winner
- 2001 – Bremer Author scholarship
- 2003 – Klagenfurt Literature Course
- 2004 – Leipzig Literature Scholarship
- 2005 – prose fellowship from the Jürgen Ponto Foundation
- 2007 – Wolfgang Weyrauch Prize
- 2007 – Berlin Senate Scholarship
- 2008 – New York Fellowship in the German House
- 2010 – Scholarship from the Heinrich-Heine House of Lüneburg
- 2011 – Berliner Kunstpreis, the Academy of Arts Berlin
- 2012 – Peter Huchel Prize for Sommer vor den Mauern
- 2017 – Roswitha Prize
- 2019 – Kranichsteiner Literaturpreis for Gesellschaft mit beschränkter Haftung
- 2020 – Thomas Mann Prize
- 2020 – Joseph-Breitbach-Preis

== Publications ==
- literaturWERKstatt, ed. (2003). "Fischeköpfe". 11. Open Mike, Volume 11. BUCH&media. ISBN 978-3-86520-038-9.
- Gegend: Roman (Area), novel, Frankfurter Verlagsanstalt, 2006, ISBN 978-3-627-00136-0.
- Reglose Jagd: Gedichte (Motionless hunting), poems, ISBN 3-933156-88-2.
- Location (audio CD), Munich-Spring-Verlag, München 2009.
- Webers Protokoll (Weber's protocol), novel, Frankfurter Verlagsanstalt, 2009, ISBN 978-3-627-00159-9.
- Sommer vor den Mauern: Gedichte (Summer before the walls), poetry, Carl Hanser Verlag, Munich 2011, ISBN 3-446-23629-5.
- Gesellschaft mit beschränkter Haftung (Limited liability company), novel, Hanser, Munich 2012, ISBN 978-3-446-23975-3.
- 36,9°. novel, Hanser, Munich 2015, ISBN 978-3-446-24898-4.
- Rotlicht. Reportage. Hanser, Munich 2017, ISBN 978-3-446-25457-2.
- Kreuzzug mit Hund. poems, Suhrkamp, Berlin 2018, ISBN 978-3-518-42818-4.
- Schutzzone. novel, Suhrkamp, Berlin 2019, ISBN 978-3-518-42882-5.
- Auch morgen. Politische Texte. Suhrkamp, Berlin 2021, ISBN 978-3-518-12773-5.
- Die Geschmeidigen: Meine Generation und der neue Ernst des Lebens. Ullstein, Berlin 2022, ISBN 978-3-550-20200-1.
- Reichskanzlerplatz. novel, Suhrkamp, Berlin 2024, ISBN 978-3-518-43190-0.
