= Leif Randt =

German novelist and playwright

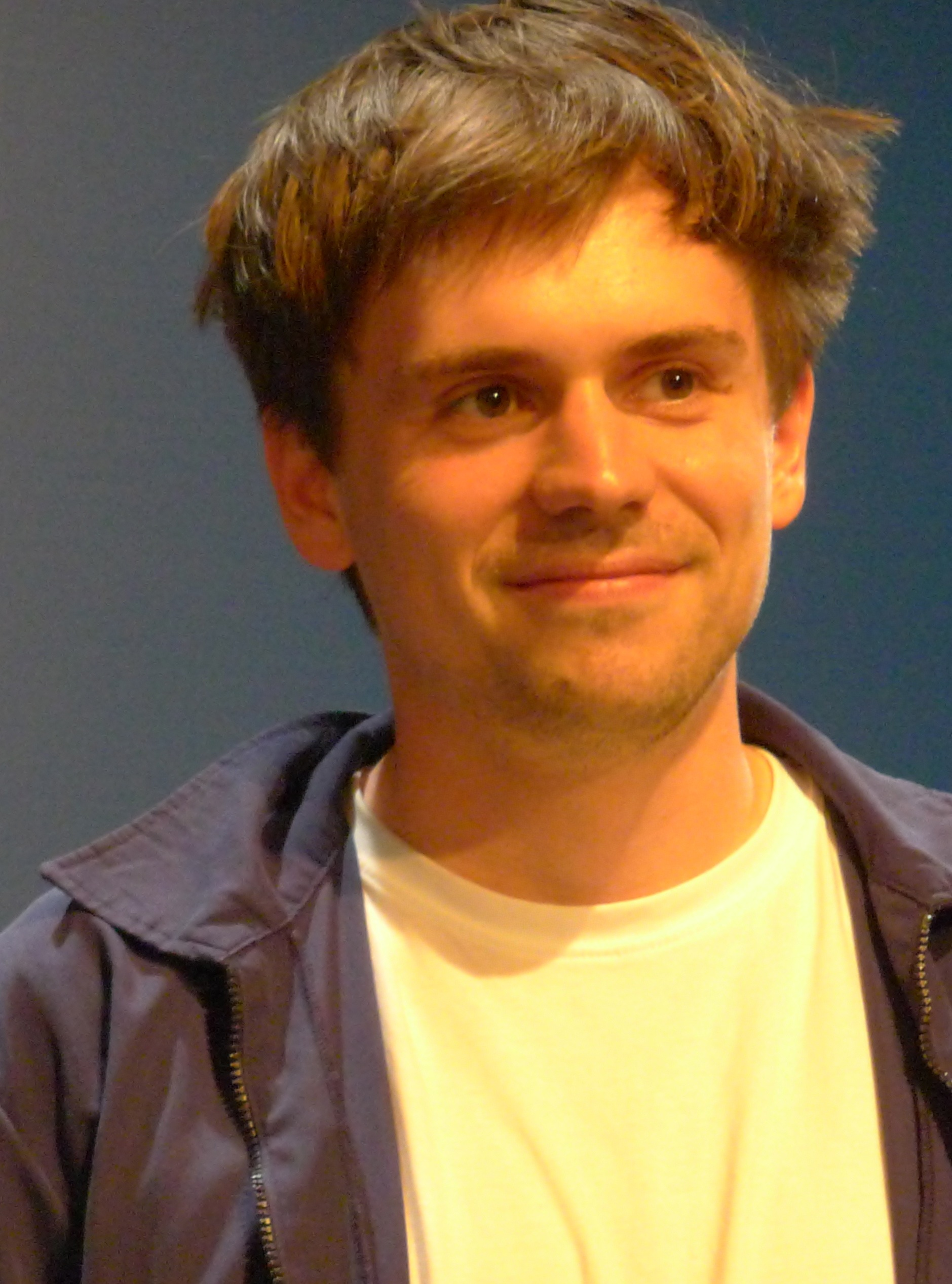
- Born: 22 October 1983 (age 43); Frankfurt am Main, Germany
- Occupations: Novelist, playwright
- Writing career
- Notable works: Leuchtspielhaus, Planet Magnon, Allegro Pastell

Leif Randt (born 22 October 1983) is a German novelist and playwright known for his precise, understated prose.

== Biography ==
Randt was born 14 October 1983 in Frankfurt am Main. He grew up in Maintal and studied Creative Writing and Cultural Journalism at the University of Hildesheim.

Randt made his debut in 2009 with Leuchtspielhaus, a novel that introduced his characteristic blend of clarity and quiet irony.

== Career ==
In 2015 Randt published Planet Magnon, a speculative novel set in a post‑capitalist future. The book attracted critical attention for its unusual combination of utopian architecture, communal structures, and emotional minimalism. His later novel Allegro Pastell (2020) explored digital‑age relationships and was widely discussed for its portrayal of intimacy mediated through technology.

== Personal life ==
Randt divides his time between Berlin and Maintal and continues to work as a novelist and cultural commentator.

== Works ==
=== Novels ===
- Leuchtspielhaus (2009)
- Schimmernder Dunst über CobyCounty (2011)
- Planet Magnon (2015)
- Allegro Pastell (2020)

=== Plays and other writing ===
- Die Kanzlerin – Eine Fiktion (2017)
- Essays and short prose in German literary magazines

== Awards and recognition ==
- Festival of German-Language Literature
- Erich Fried Prize
- Immergut Festival
- Mörike-Preis der Stadt Fellbach
- Friedrich-Hölderlin-Preis
- MDR-Literaturpreis
