= Literaturpreis der Stadt Bremen =

German literary award

The Bremen Literature Prize (German: Literaturpreis der Stadt Bremen, literally: Literature Prize of the city of Bremen) is a German literary award. The prize money is €25,000 (Förderpreis: €6,000).

== Recipients ==
- 1954 Heinrich Schmidt-Barrien for Tanzgeschichten. Ein Reigen aus dem Leben
- 1955 Ilse Aichinger for Der Gefesselte. Erzählungen, Herbert Meier for Die Barke von Gawdos. Stück in 3 Akten
- 1956 Ernst Jünger for Am Sarazenenturm
- 1957 Ingeborg Bachmann for Anrufung des großen Bären, Gerd Oelschlegel for Romeo und Julia in Berlin
- 1958 Paul Celan for Mohn und Gedächtnis och Von Schwelle zu Schwelle
- 1959 Rolf Schroers for In fremder Sache
- 1960 not awarded
- 1961 not awarded
- 1962 Siegfried Lenz for Zeit der Schuldlosen
- 1963 Herbert Heckmann for Benjamin und seine Väter
- 1964 Christa Reinig for Gedichte
- 1965 Thomas Bernhard for Frost
- 1966 Wolfgang Hildesheimer for Tynset
- 1967 Hans Günter Michelsen for Helm
- 1968 Helga M. Novak for Colloquium mit vier Häuten
- 1969 Horst Bienek for Die Zelle
- 1970 Christian Enzensberger for Größerer Versuch über den Schmutz
- 1971 Gabriele Wohmann for Ernste Absicht
- 1972 Jürg Acklin for Alias
- 1973 Günter Herburger for Die Eroberung der Zitadelle
- 1974 Jurek Becker for Irreführung der Behörden
- 1975 Franz Innerhofer for Schöne Tage
- 1976 Paul Nizon for Stolz
- 1977 Nicolas Born for Die erdabgewandte Seite der Geschichte, Heinar Kipphardt for März, Förderpreis Karin Kiwus for Von beiden Seiten der Gegenwart
- 1978 Christa Wolf for Kindheitsmuster, Förderpreis Maria Erlenberger for Der Hunger nach Wahnsinn
- 1979 Alexander Kluge for Neue Geschichten. Hefte 1-18, Unheimlichkeit der Zeit, Förderpreis Uwe Timm for Morenga
- 1980 Peter Rühmkorf for Haltbar bis Ende 1999, Förderpreis Peter-Paul Zahl for Die Glücklichen
- 1981 Christoph Meckel for Suchbild. Über meinen Vater och Säure, Förderpreis Werner Kofler for Aus der Wildnis. Zwei Fragmente
- 1982 Peter Weiss for Die Ästhetik des Widerstands, Förderpreis Franz Böni for Die Wanderarbeiter
- 1983 Erich Fried for Das Nahe suchen, Förderpreis Clemens Mettler for Gleich einem Standbild, so unbewegt
- 1984 Paul Wühr for Das falsche Buch, Förderpreis Bodo Morshäuser for Die Berliner Simulation
- 1985 Rolf Haufs for Juniabend, Förderpreis Herta Müller for Niederungen
- 1986 Volker Braun for Hinze-Kunze-Roman, Förderpreis Eva Schmidt for Ein Vergleich mit dem Leben
- 1987 Jürgen Becker for Odenthals Küste, Förderpreis Daniel Grolle for Keinen Schritt weiter
- 1988 Peter Handke for Nachmittag eines Schriftstellers & Die Abwesenheit, Förderpreis Evelyn Schlag for Die Kränkung
- 1989 Ingomar von Kieseritzky for Das Buch der Desaster, Förderpreis Norbert Gstrein for Einer
- 1990 Wilhelm Genazino for Der Fleck, die Jacke, die Zimmer, der Schmerz, Förderpreis Irina Liebmann for Mitten im Krieg
- 1991 Fritz Rudolf Fries for Die Väter im Kino, Förderpreis Thomas Strittmatter for Raabe Baikal
- 1992 Ror Wolf for Nachrichten aus der bewohnten Welt, Förderpreis Durs Grünbein for Schädelbasislektion
- 1993 Georges-Arthur Goldschmidt for Der unterbrochene Wald, Förderpreis Hans-Ulrich Treichel for Von Leib und Seele
- 1994 Wolfgang Hilbig for Ich, Förderpreis Peter Weber for Der Wettermacher
- 1995 Reinhard Lettau for Flucht vor Gästen, Förderpreis Marion Titze for Unbekannter Verlust
- 1996 Elfriede Jelinek for Die Kinder der Toten, Förderpreis Jens Sparschuh for Der Zimmerspringbrunnen. Ein Heimatroman
- 1997 Michael Roes for Rub' al-Khali – Leeres Viertel. Invention über das Spiel, Förderpreis Stefanie Menzinger for Wanderungen im Inneren des Häftlings
- 1998 Einar Schleef for Droge Faust Parsifal, Förderpreis Brigitte Oleschinski for Your passport is not guilty
- 1999 Dieter Forte for In der Erinnerung, Förderpreis Judith Hermann for Sommerhaus, später
- 2000 Adolf Endler for Der Pudding der Apokalypse; Förderpreis Christa Estenfeld for Menschenfresserin
- 2001 Alexander Kluge for Chronik der Gefühle; Förderpreis Raphael Urweider for Lichter in Menlo Park
- 2002 W.G. Sebald postumt for Austerlitz; Förderpreis Juli Zeh for Adler und Engel
- 2003 Ulrich Peltzer for Bryant Park; Förderpreis Andreas Schäfer for Auf dem Weg nach Messara
- 2004 Lutz Seiler for vierzig kilometer nacht; Förderpreis Jörg Matheis for Mono
- 2005 Brigitte Kronauer for Verlangen nach Musik und Gebirge; Förderpreis Antje Rávic Strubel for Tupolew 134
- 2006 Reinhard Jirgl for Abtrünnig; Förderpreis Svenja Leiber for Büchsenlicht
- 2007 Felicitas Hoppe for Johanna; Förderpreis Saša Stanišić for Wie der Soldat das Grammofon repariert
- 2008 Hans Joachim Schädlich for Vorbei; Förderpreis Thomas Melle for Raumforderung
- 2009 Martin Kluger for Der Vogel, der spazieren geht; Förderpreis Mathias Gatza for Der Schatten der Tiere
- 2010 Clemens J. Setz for Die Frequenzen; Förderpreis Roman Graf for Herr Blanc
- 2011 Friederike Mayröcker for ich bin in der Anstalt. Fusznoten zu einem nichtgeschriebenen Werk; Förderpreis Andrea Grill for Das Schöne und das Notwendige
- 2012 Marlene Streeruwitz for Die Schmerzmacherin; Förderpreis Joachim Meyerhoff for Alle Toten fliegen hoch. Amerika
- 2013 Wolf Haas for Verteidigung der Missionarsstellung; Förderpreis Andreas Stichmann for Das große Leuchten
- 2014 Clemens Meyer for Im Stein; Förderpreis Roman Ehrlich for Das kalte Jahr
- 2015 Marcel Beyer for Graphit; Förderpreis Nadja Küchenmeister for Unter dem Wacholder
- 2016 Henning Ahrens for Glantz und Gloria; Förderpreis Matthias Nawrat for Die vielen Tode unseres Opas Jurek
- 2017 Terézia Mora for Die Liebe unter Aliens; Förderpreis Senthuran Varatharajah for Vor der Zunahme der Zeichen
- 2018 Thomas Lehr for Schlafende Sonne; Förderpreis Laura Freudenthaler for Die Königin schweigt
- 2019 Arno Geiger for Unter der Drachenwand; Förderpreis Heinz Helle for Die Überwindung der Schwerkraft
- 2020 Barbara Honigmann for Georg; Förderpreis Tonio Schachinger for Nicht wie ihr
- 2021 Marion Poschmann for Nimbus; Förderpreis Jana Volkmann for Auwald
- 2022 Judith Hermann for Daheim; Förderpreis Matthias Senkel for Winkel der Welt
- 2023 Thomas Stangl for Quecksilberlicht; Förderpreis Martin Kordić for Jahre mit Martha
- 2024 Teresa Präauer for Kochen im falschen Jahrhundert; Förderpreis Katharina Mevissen for Mutters Stimmbruch
- 2025 Wilhelm Bartsch for Hohe See und niemands Land; Förderpreis Stefanie Sargnagel for Iowa – Ein Ausflug nach Amerika
- 2026 Heinz Strunk for Kein Geld Kein Glück Kein Sprit; Förderpreis Kaleb Erdmann for Ausweichschule
