= Elena Shvarts =

Russian metarealist poet

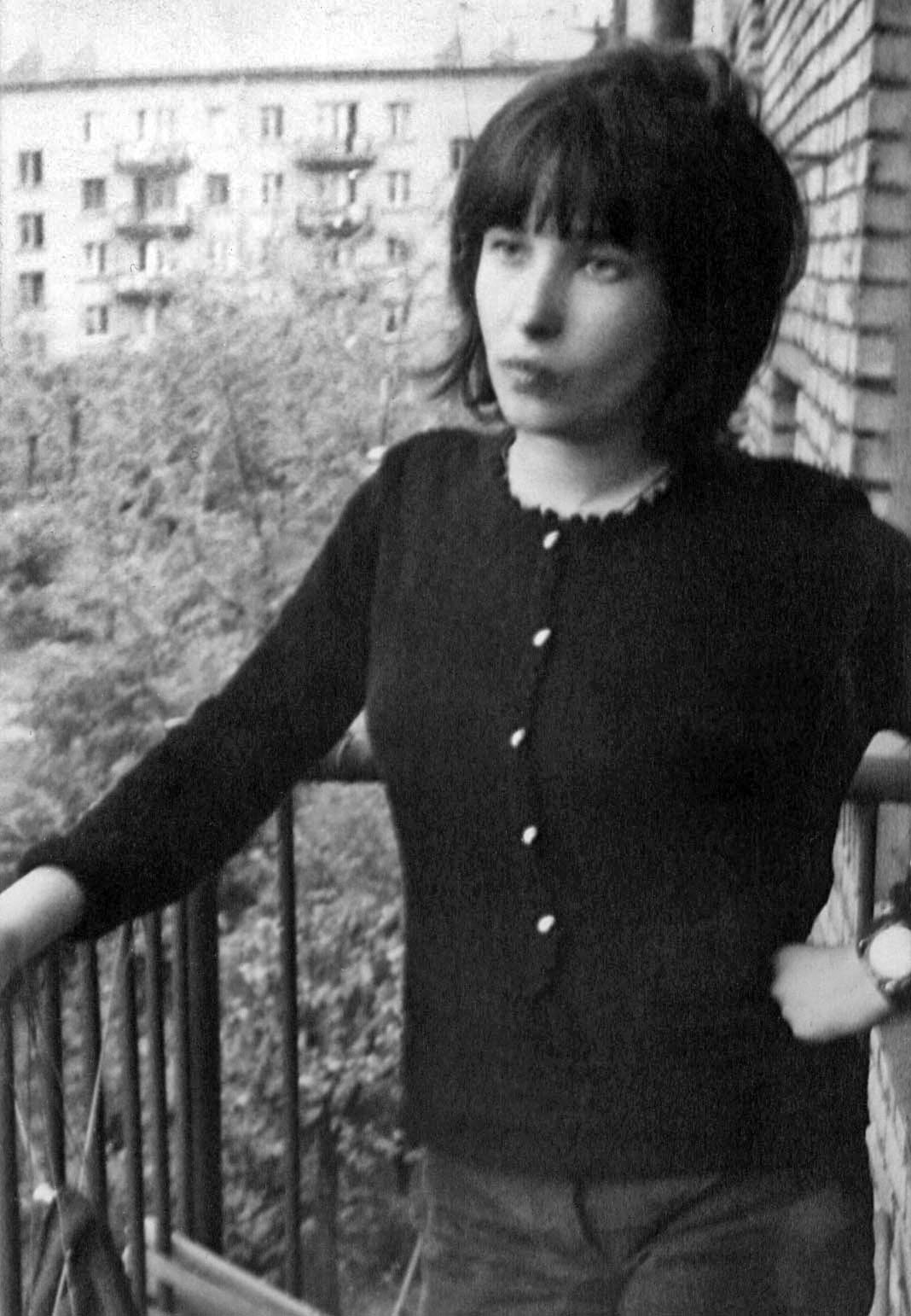
Elena Shvarts in the late 1960s (photo by N. Koroleva)

Elena Andreyevna Shvarts (Russian: Елена Андреевна Шварц) (17 May 1948 – 11 March 2010) was a Russian metarealist poet.

Shvarts was born in Leningrad, where she lived her entire life. Her mother was Dina Morisovna Shvarts, the chief dramaturg for the Bolshoi Drama Theater (BDT), where she worked alongside its famous director Georgy Tovstonogov. In the 1960s, Shvarts attended literary circles for youths at the Palace of Pioneers in Leningrad, now Saint Petersburg. Shvarts studied at the Leningrad Institute of Film, Music and Theatre.

Shvarts's poems were first published officially in the Russian page (Russkaia stranitsa) of the University of Tartu newspaper in 1973. Her work was also published in samizdat journals such as Thirty-seven (Tridtsat' sem'), The Clock (Chasy), and others.

Shvarts's work began to appear in tamizdat (émigré publications) in 1978, and she published two collections of poetry (Tantsuyushchii David and Stikhi) and a novel in verse (Trudy i dni Lavinii) abroad before a collection (Storony sveta) was allowed to be published in the Soviet Union, "bringing her immediate recognition both at home and abroad." Birdsong escaping from a cage is a metaphor running through her work.

Dr. Laura Little describes Shvarts's poetry as being "characterized by elaborate authorial masks and endless metamorphoses." Shvarts's work also includes "allusions to the foreign and Russian texts that inspire her writing." In 1989, Barbara Heldt, an emerita professor of Russian at the University of British Columbia, noted that Shvarts often wrote "poetic cycles," or "long poems composed of several interrelating sections."

Shvarts was known as an "openly spiritual poet;" she described poetry as a "a way of reaching the non-material (spiritual) by semi-material means."

Shvarts won the Andrei Bely Prize in 1979 for poetry. In 2003, she was awarded the Triumph Prize in 2003, which is "an independent award for lifetime's achievement in the arts."

== Bibliography ==
=== Russian ===
Poems

- «Танцующий Давид» (Dancing David) (New York City: Russica Publishers, 1985)
- «Стихи» (Verses) (Paris: Беседа, 1987)
- «Труды и дни Лавинии, монахини из ордена Обрезания Сердца» (Labours and days of Lavinia) (Ann Arbor: Ardis Publishers, 1987)
- «Стороны света» (Cardinal direction) (Leningrad: Sovetsky Pisatel, the Leningrad Department, 1989)
- «Стихи» (Verses) (Л.: Ассоциация «Новая литература», 1990)
- «Лоция ночи. Книга поэм» (Rutter of the Night, a book of long poems) (СПб.: Советский писатель, Санкт-Петербургское отделение, 1993)
- «Песня птицы на дне морском» (A Song of the Bird at the Sea-Bottom) (СПб.: Пушкинский фонд, 1995)
- «Mundus Imaginalis» (СПб.: Эзро, 1996)
- «Западно-восточный ветер» (The West-Ost Wind) (СПб.: Пушкинский фонд, 1997)
- «Соло на раскалённой трубе» (The Solo on the fiery Trumpet) (СПб.: Пушкинский фонд, 1998)
- «Стихотворения и поэмы» (Verses and Long Poems) (СПб.: Инапресс, 1999)
- «Дикопись последнего времени» (The wild Script of the last Time) (СПб.: Пушкинский фонд, 2001)
- «Трость скорописца» (The Walking-Stick of the Tachygraph) (СПб.: Пушкинский фонд, 2004)
- «Вино седьмого года» (The Wine of the seventh Year) (СПб.: Пушкинский фонд, 2007)

Prose and essay

- Определение в дурную погоду (Definition while the Weather is Bad) (СПб.: Пушкинский фонд, 1997)
- Видимая сторона жизни (The visible Side of the Life) (СПб.: Лимбус, 2003)

Collected Works

- «Сочинения Елены Шварц» (Collected Works by Elena Shvarts, Volumes I-II), тт. I-II (СПб.: Пушкинский фонд, 2002, verses and long poems)
- «Сочинения Елены Шварц» (Collected Works by Elena Shvarts, Volumes III-IV), тт. III-IV (СПб.: Пушкинский фонд, 2008, verses, prose and a theatrical play)

=== Translations ===
- Paradise: selected poems. Newcastle upon Tyne: Bloodaxe, 1993
- Ein kaltes Feuer brennt an den Knochen entlang ... : Gedichte. Chemnitz; Berlin; St. Petersburg: Oberbaum, 1997
- Das Blumentier: Gedichte. Düsseldorf: Grupello-Verl., 1999
- La vierge chevauchant Venise et moi sur son épaule: poèmes. Évian: Alidades, 2003
- Olga Martynova, Jelena Schwarz. Rom liegt irgendwo in Russland. Zwei russische Dichterinnen im lyrischen Dialog über Rom. Russisch / Deutsch. Aus dem Russischen von Elke Erb und Olga Martynova. Wien: Edition per procura, 2006
- Birdsong on the seabed. Tarset: Bloodaxe Books, 2008
- Werken en dagen van de non-Lavinia. Amsterdam, 2009

=== Anthologies ===
- Child of Europe: A New Anthology of East European Poetry, edited by Michael March (London: Penguin, 1990)
- Twentieth-Century Russian Poetry, edited by John Glad and Daniel Weissbort (Iowa City: University of Iowa Press, 1992)
- Contemporary Russian Poetry: A Bilingual Anthology, ed. Gerald Smith (Bloomington and Indianapolis: Indiana University Press, 1993)
- Third Wave: The New Russian Poetry, eds. Kent Johnson and Stephen M. Ashby (Ann Arbor: University of Michigan Press, 1992)
- In the Grip of Strange Thoughts: Russian Poetry in the New Era, ed. J. Kates (Zephyr Press, 1999)
