= Ute Erb =

German writer, poet and translator

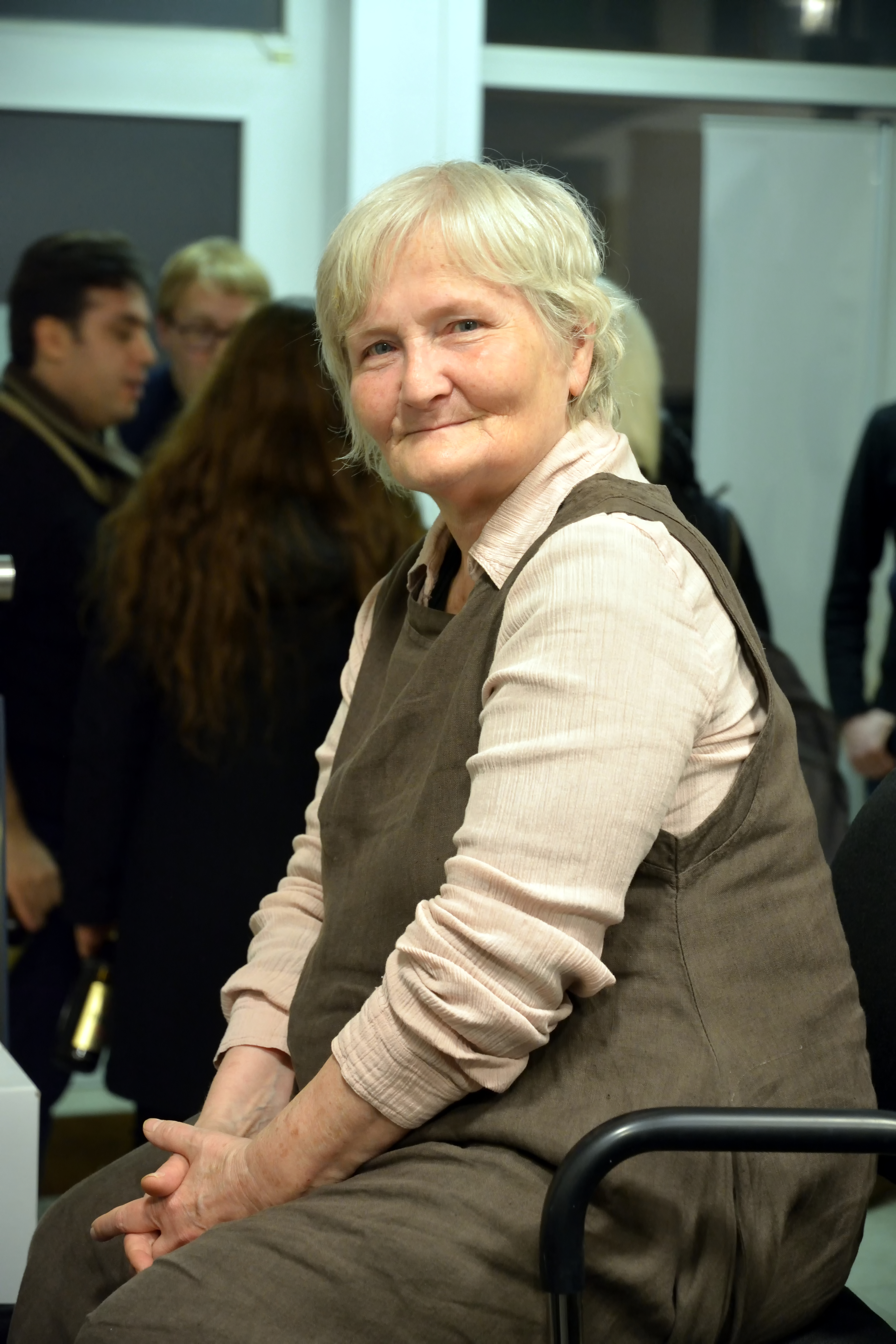
- 2017
- Born: 25 December 1940 (age 85); Scherbach (Rheinbach), Köln-Aachen, Germany
- Occupations: Novelist poet translator kommune 1 activist
- Political party: SPD; SEW
- Spouse(s): 1. Michael Pampuch; 2. Hermann Schürrer (1928–1986)
- Father: Ewald Erb (1903–1978)

Ute Erb (born 25 December 1940) is a German writer, poet and translator. She grew up in the German Democratic Republic (East Germany); but when she was 16 she escaped illegally to the west, without telling her parents, and ended up living in Cologne "with friends". She was driven to it, as she later explained, "by a homesickness for a Germany that simply did not exist". It would not be the last time she would display a well-honed rebellious streak.

== Family provenance and early years ==
Ute Erb was born at Scherbach (subsequently subsumed into Rheinbach) in the hills south of Bonn. Her parents had moved there with her uncle Otto and his family in 1937 in order, as her father put it, to "overwinter National Socialism". Ewald Erb (1903–1978), her father, worked at the local tax office, having lost his academic post as a Marxist literary historian at the University of Bonn in 1933 on account of suspected "Communist activities". Her mother Elisabeth worked on the land. Ute was the youngest of her parents' three daughters, all born in Scherbach between 1938 and 1941, when her father was conscripted for military service.

== Disrupted childhood ==
In 1949 Ewald Erb moved his family from Rheinbach, in the British occupation zone, to Halle in the Soviet zone. He had already been offered and accepted an invitation to take a Humanities professorship at Halle University two years earlier but final confirmation of it had been deferred, apparently due to suspicions on the part of the authorities that he was an "English agent". When the girls and their mother arrived in Halle their father was therefore unemployed and suffering from a form of situational Neuropathy. Ute and her two sisters were removed from the family and installed at a Francke Foundation orphanage where they lived for the next few years. In the late 1940s, the Francke Foundation assets in Halle had been expropriated and handed over to the control of the university, which after 1946 facilitated more direct levels of party control. While she remained at the orphanage, and as far as these circumstances allowed, Ute Erb received a conventional party approved upbringing, joining the "Young Pioneers" with the others. She also joined the children's group organised by Jenny Gertz, a dancer and Jewish concentration camp survivor. Meanwhile, the authorities seem to have been becoming reconciled, little by little, to the idea that her father was not a western spy. The university professorship never materialised, but he was allocated a job as a secondary school teacher. Later he became a senior research assistant at the university's Institute for German Literature which provided the opportunity to work on his "History of German Literature", a multi-volume Marxist compilation. At some point the family were reunited.

== First novel ==
Erb discusses her escape to the west and the reasons for it in her semi-autobiographical novel "Die Kette an deinem Hals" (loosely, "The chain round your neck") which she started to write at the suggestion of a friend, the physician and committed antifascist activist Joseph Scholmer. By the time the book was completed and, in 1960, published, the author was living and working at the Kibbutz Gal'ed in the Galilee. "Die Kette an deinem Hals" nevertheless enjoyed significant commercial success, despite being the author's first published novel. In due course a film version was produced (1965) and the book was translated into several languages.

== First marriage ==
By 1962 she was back in Germany, where she settled in Charlottenburg (West Berlin) and married Michael Pampuch, a professional simultaneous interpreter and singer. The couple's sons were born in 1961 and 1963. Erb and Pampuch also teamed up to produce a German language translation of Booth Mooney's then topical biography of President Lyndon Johnson. The marriage ended in divorce in 1966.

== Party memberships ==
After her youthful escape to West Germany, the homeland security services of East Germany continued to keep an eye on Ute Erb's activities. In May 1961 "IM Hermann" reported back to his handlers at the "Ministry for State Security in East Berlin, "she has a very idiosyncratic character, and insists on her own opinions". (Note: «... sie vertritt einen sehr eigenwilligen Charakter und beharrt auf ihren Auffassungen.») Ute Erb joined the SPD in 1967, but was expelled four months later for taking a lead in disrupting a US troop parade in Berlin, as part of the wider struggle against the Vietnam War. In 1970, she joined the Socialist Unity Party of West Berlin (SEW), a western branch of the East German ruling party. Without the muscular state backing available in the Soviet sponsored German Democratic Republic, however, the Socialist Unity Party and its Berlin proxy never acquired significant traction in West Berlin or in West Germany, where after 1949 it was widely perceived as a proxy for Moscow's all-too traditional imperialist ambitions. Despite her party memberships, even though she was clearly involved in her own varieties of political activism, Ute Erb never became a significant figure in Berlin's party political scene.

== Tertiary education? ==
In May 1968 she passed the Abitur, which under most circumstances would open the way to university-level education. She was unusual but very far from unique in reaching this stage at the relatively advanced age of 27, making use of the so-called "Zweiter Bildungsweg" ("alternative education path"), which involved attending evening classes. She enrolled at the "Pädagogische Hochschule" (Berlin Teachers' Training Academy), supported by a bursary, but the financial and other pressures of combining the course with her responsibilities as a single parent and her political activism proved unsustainable, and she never finished that course. Instead she embarked on an apprenticeship as a compositor with the "Druckhaus Norden" printing business, also becoming a self-trained proof-reader.

== Second marriage ==
Ute Erb's second marriage, in 1973, was to the Austrian polymath-poet Hermann Schürrer. The couple divorced in 1974, but remained good friends until Schürrer's death in 1986, collaborating on a number of written works.

== Activist ==
Ute Erb became part of the "Kommune 1" movement which grew out of the 1968 student protests. She was a co-founder and "lead tenant" of "Kommune 99" and active in the "Kinderladen" movement, dedicated to an alternative template for Kindergarten organisation, (Note: The "Kinderladen" movement (loosely, "Child Shops movement") was so-called because it established a number of Kindergartens in repurposed corner shops that had become vacant following the arrival of supermarkets.) their objectives summarized in the slogan, "More parents for each child". Erb's political engagement led to a series of court appearances. The former militant and lawyer Horst Mahler provided her with legal representation on a number of occasions, but Mahler was himself not always at liberty, and in her later encounters with the criminal justice system Erb was represented by Hans-Christian Ströbele.

== Poetry volumes ==
In 1976 Erb's first volume of poems was published by Wolfgang Fietkau Verlag (publishers) Wolfgang Fietkau had a reputation as a publisher of modern avant-garde literature. Her second poetry volume appeared three years later. Meanwhile, in 1976 she was also in charge of organising Berlin's second Authors' Day under the catch-phrase (which may have resonated more persuasively at the time than a generation later) "Write that down, woman". She became involved in the executive committee of the West Berlin German Authors' Association, the West German "Writers' Working Circle", the Standing Committee for Culture Days at "Progressive Kunst West-Berlin e. V." and with the Lebanon aid charity, "Libanon-Hilfe". Reflecting the Austrian connections acquired through her marriage with Hermann Schürrer she is also a member of the Grazer Autorenversammlung (based, since 1975, not in Graz but in Vienna).

== Day jobs ==
From 1974, Erb supported herself by working as a compositor and proofreader. One important but challenging proofreading assignment she undertook involved the 543-page first volume (generously illustrated and annotated) in the series "Forschungsschwerpunkt Theorie und Geschichte von Bau, Raum und Alltagskultur in Berlin an der Hochschule der Künste in Westberlin".

In 1982 she founded "Schriftstellerei Ute Erb & Kollektiv", a short-lived and somewhat niche co-operatively organised and structured publishing operation. She published the first volume by Sigrun Casper, an author who has subsequently come to wider prominence among critics and readers who focus on the short-story genre.

== Third marriage ==
1982 was also the year in which Ute Erb married Omar Saad: the marriage ended in divorce four years later. It was the longest of Ute Erb's (three) marriages to date. Omar Saad was described at the time as a Palestinian letter writer and asylum seeker.

== Output (selection) ==
- Die Kette an deinem Hals. Europäische Verlagsanstalt, Frankfurt 1960 (Bertelsmann Lesering: Gütersloh 1962)
- as translator into German, together with Michael Pampuch: Booth Mooney: Lyndon B. Johnson. Colloquium, Berlin 1964
- Sade Marquis de (1990). Die Marquise de Gange ein historischer Roman (in German). Gifkendorf. ISBN 978-3-87536-089-9. OCLC 74913816.
- Bataille, Georges (1989). Gilles de Rais : Leben und Prozeß eines Kindermörders (in German). Hamburg: Merlin-Verl. ISBN 3-87536-042-7. OCLC 180511288.
- Das Wochenende einer Gastarbeiterin. Westdeutscher Rundfunk, Köln 1968 (Fernsehskizze)
- Hütet euren Kopf. Gedichte. Sender Freies Berlin, 1972
- Nie kommen wir ins Paradies. Gedichte. Sender Freies Berlin, 1973
- Schindluder treiben. Gedichte. Sender Freies Berlin, 1975
- Erb, Ute (1976). Ein schöner Land : Gedichte (in German). Berlin. ISBN 3-87352-030-3. OCLC 2836941.
- Erb, Ute (1979). Schulter an Schulter : 75 Gedichte u. Sprüche auf e. Griff (in German). Berlin: Edition Neue Wege. ISBN 3-88348-025-8. OCLC 6378417.
- as translator into German: Tahsin İncirci: Lieder für den Frieden und Lieder aus der Fremde. with Sümeyra and Türkischer Arbeiterchor Westberlin. Verlag „pläne", Dortmund 1979 (LP, Übertragung ins Deutsche)
- Ich habe einen Mann in Süddeutschland. Lyrik bei SFB1, 18. Oktober 1982. 23:00–23:10 Uhr (not an interview but a talk)
- Berliner Künstler. Feature in SFB3 (Journal), 7. Juni 1983, 17:05–18:10 Uhr
- Ende einer Versammlung. In: Radio Bremen am 20. April 1984, 22:50–23:00 Uhr
- Frauenleiden. In: Schreibwerkstatt – Texte von Frauen. Hessischer Rundfunk am 6. Januar 1985, 16:15–16:30 Uhr (as part of a 2 Minute contribution by von Anna Rheinsberg)
- Lyrik und Interview (17 Minuten) in Deutschland – Deutschland (2) Die Töchter der Verlierer. In: WDR3 (Fernsehen) ab 22:20 Uhr (overall length 69 Minuten)
- Alternative – Gebrauchsanthologie. 1. Zwanzig Einfälle auf zehn Streichholzschachteln. Amerikanischer Sektor. Berlin 1988
- Gebühreneinheit. In: Lyrik um zehn vor elf. RBII am 8. Januar 1989, 22:50–23:00 Uhr
- with Regina Nössler: So können wir uns nicht trennen. In: Neue literarische Texte. SFB3 (Hörfunk), 16. April 1989, 18:30–19:00 (Textanteil 12,5 Minuten)
- with Petra Ganglbauer in Jazz und Lyrik. Es las Judith Kelle. Es dankten fürs Zuhören Gerald Bisinger und Friederike Raderer auf ORF 2 1995.
