= Olga Martynova =

Russian-German writer (born 1962)

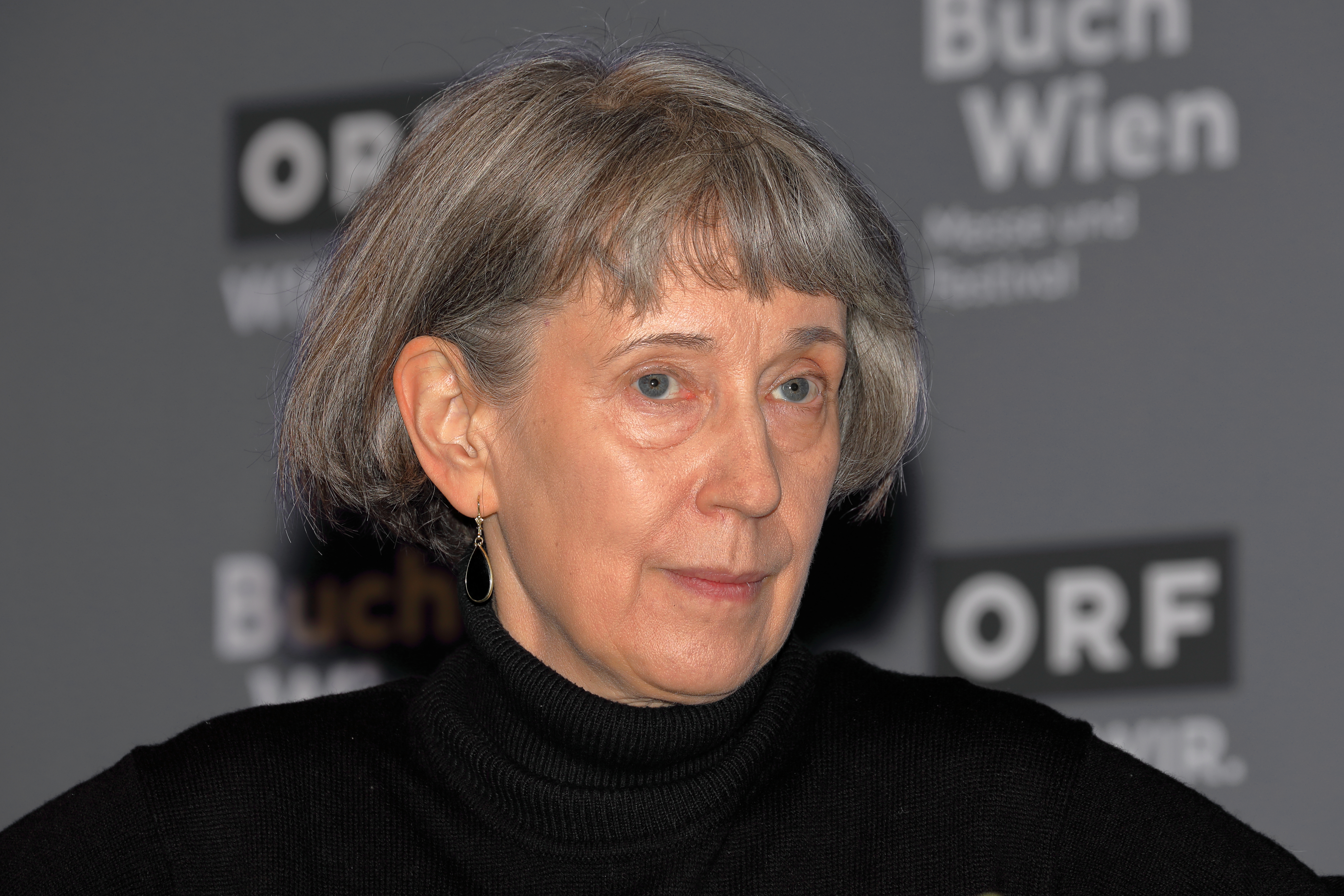
Martynova at the Book Vienna (2023)

Olga Martynova (born in 1962) is a Russian-German writer. She writes poems in Russian, and prose and essays in German.

== Life ==
Olga Martynova was born in 1962 in Dudinka, Krasnoyarsk Krai, Russian SFSR, Soviet Union. She grew up in Leningrad where she studied Russian literature and language and was active in various literary circles. After an exchange in Berlin in 1990, she moved in 1991 with her husband, the Russian poet, novelist and playwright Oleg Yuriev (1959–2018), and their son Daniel to Frankfurt, where they currently live.

Her numerous contributions in German-language periodicals have been translated into English, Polish, Slovak, Bulgarian, Danish and, more recently, Russian. Her Russian poems have been translated, sometimes even self-translated, into German, English, Italian, Albanian and French. She also works as an essayist and reviewer for newspapers such as the Neue Zürcher Zeitung, Die Zeit and the Frankfurter Rundschau.

Martynova was awarded the Hubert Burda Preis für junge Lyrik for poets from Eastern, Southern and Central Europe in 2000.

The 2006 book Rom liegt irgendwo in Russland (Rome lies somewhere in Russia) was written in collaboration with her friend, the Russian poet Elena Shvarts.

In 2010 she published her first novel, Sogar Papageien überleben uns (Even Parrots Survive Us), that tells in short sketches the story of a St. Petersburg literary scholar in Germany because of a literary conference, and seeking to reconnect with her former lover. The book made it onto the longlist of the German Book Prize and the shortlist of the aspekte-literature prize.

In 2012 Martynova won the prestigious Ingeborg-Bachmann-Prize with her text "Ich werde sagen: "Hi!". The story, with references to cultural history, focuses on a young man who experiences the simultaneous awakening of erotic feelings and an interest in poetry.

== Bibliography ==
=== In Russian ===
- Postup´yanvarskikh sadov (poems), Moscow 1989 (in the convolute Kamera khraneniya)
- Sumas`shedshiy kuznechik (poems), St Petersburg 1994
- Chetyre vremeni nochi (poems), St Petersburg 1998
- Frantsuzskaia biblioteka (poems), Moscow 2007
- O Vvedenskom. O Chvirike i Chvirke / Issledovaniya v stikhakh (poems), Moscow 2010 (Russian Prize 2009, the long list).

=== In German ===
- Brief an die Zypressen (poems), Rimbaud, Aachen 2001, ISBN 978-3-89086-736-6.
- Wer schenkt was wem (essays and book reviews), Rimbaud, Aachen 2003, ISBN 978-3-89086-686-4.
- In der Zugluft Europas (poems), Wunderhorn, Heidelberg 2009, ISBN 978-3-88423-327-6.
- Sogar Papageien überleben uns (a novel), Droschl, Graz 2009, ISBN 978-3-85420-765-8 – the long list of the German Bookprize 2010, the short list of the Aspekte-Prize of the ZDF (2010), Adalbert-von-Chamisso-Prize 2011, Roswitha-Prize 2011.
- Zwischen den Tischen. Olga Martynova und Oleg Jurjew im essayistischen Dialog. Bernstein, Bonn 2011, ISBN 978-3-939431-73-2 (essays by Olga Martynova and Oleg Yuriev).
- Von Tschwirik und Tschwirka (poems). Droschl, Graz 2012, ISBN 978-3-85420-831-0.
- Mörikes Schlüsselbein (a novel), Droschl, Graz 2013, ISBN 978-3-85420-841-9.
- Der Engelherd (a novel), S. Fischer Verlag, Frankfurt/Main 2016 ISBN 978-3-10-002432-9.
- Über die Dummheit der Stunde [essays]. S. Fischer Verlag, Frankfurt/Main 2018 ISBN 978-3-10-002433-6.

In German and Russian (bilingual; in collaboration with Jelena Schwarz):

- Rom liegt irgendwo in Russland: Zwei russische Dichterinnen im lyrischen Dialog über Rom, Edition per Procura, Vienna 2006, ISBN 978-3-901118-57-9.

Poems by Martynova were translated to German, English, French, Italian.

== Awards and grants ==
- 2000 Hubert-Burda-Preis für junge Lyrik (Germany)
- 2005 Grant of the Baltic Center for Translators and Authors in Visby (Sweden)
- 2007 Grant of the Künstlerhaus Edenkoben, Edenkoben, (Germany)
- 2009 Long list of the "Russian Prize" (Russia), for O Vvedenskom. O Chvirike i Chvirke / Issledovaniya v stikhakh
- 2010 Long list of the German Book Prize (Germany), for Sogar Papageien überleben uns
- 2010 Short list of the aspekte-Literaturpreis (for Sogar Papageien überleben uns) (Germany)
- 2010 Babochka Aronzona (Aronzon's Butterfly), the annual prize of the literary site "Novaya kamera khranenia" for the poem of the year (Russia)
- 2011 Adelbert von Chamisso Prize, the promotional prize (Germany)
- 2011 Roswitha Prize (Germany)
- 2011 Grant of the City of Frankfurt am Main, (Germany)
- 2012 Ingeborg Bachmann Prize (Klagenfurt, Austria)
- 2015 Berliner Literaturpreis (Germany)
- 2025 Peter Huchel Prize
