= Daniela Seel =

German writer (born 1974)

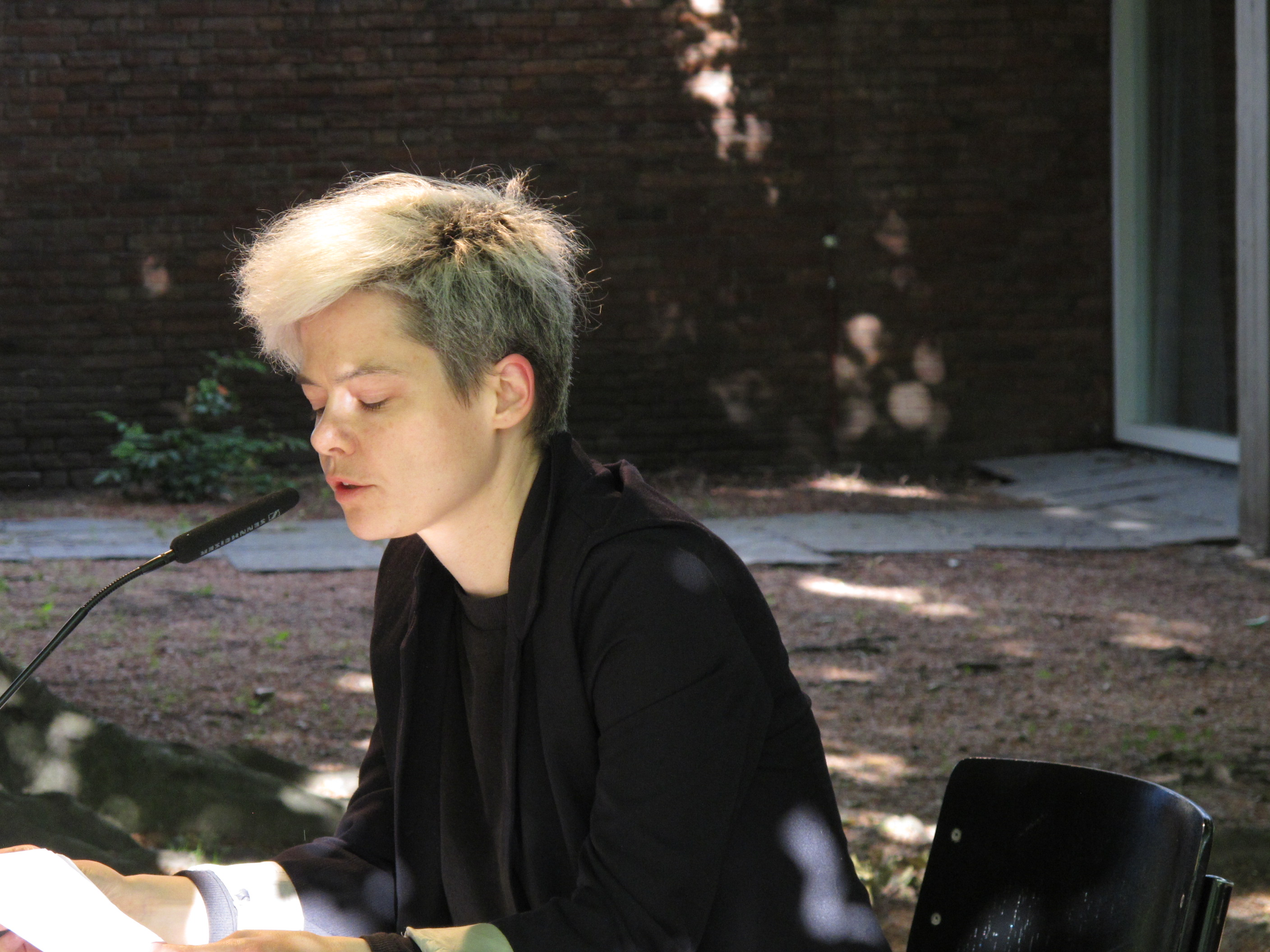
- Seel in 2014
- Born: 4 December 1974 (age 51); Frankfurt, Germany
- Occupations: Publisher, writer, literary translator
- Writing career
- Genre: Poetry

Daniela Seel (born 4 December 1974) is a German poet, translator, editor and publisher.

== Life and work ==
Born in Frankfurt, Seel studied German studies, art history and philosophy in Bayreuth, Göttingen and Berlin. In 2003, she founded the publishing house kookbooks – Labor für Poesie als Lebensform (kookbooks – laboratory for poetry as a way of life) in collaboration with German book designer and illustrator Andreas Töpfer in Idstein. Meanwhile, kookbooks is based in Berlin, where Daniela Seel lives. Besides her work as a publisher, she writes poetry and works as a book editor, translator and literary critic.

For her debut poetry collection, ich kann diese stelle nicht wiederfinden (I'm unable to find this place again) from 2011, Seel received the Friedrich-Hölderlin-Preis advancement award, the Ernst-Meister-Preis für Lyrik advancement award as well as the Art Prize for Literature of the Land Brandenburg Lotto GmbH in the same year.

In 2023, Daniela Seel was one of the co-founders of the PEN Berlin.

She lives in Berlin.

== Critical reception ==
"Die Utopie eines jungen, innovativen Literaturverlags, die Daniela Seel jetzt realisiert hat, hielten die präpotenten «Experten» für völlig blauäuig. Nun zeigt uns eine dreissigjährige Verlegerin, dass literarische Leidenschaft eben doch Berge versetzen kann. (Presumptous 'experts' considered the utopia of a young, innovative literary publisher like the one Daniela Seel has now realised to be completely naïve. Now a thirty-year-old publisher shows us that literary passion can move mountains.)"

– Michael Braun: NZZ

"Immer noch überkomme sie von Zeit zu Zeit das Gefühl, auf der falschen Seite zu stehen, sagt sie, doch sieht man ihr an, dass sie diese Last gern trägt – und es auch kann. Denn hinter ihrem zarten, verletzlich wirkenden Äußeren stecken Kraft und Selbstbewusstsein. (From time to time, she still gets the feeling that she's on the wrong side, she says, but you can tell that she's happy to carry this burden – and is able do it. Because behind her delicate, vulnerable appearance there is strength and self-confidence.)"

– Richard Kämmerlings: FAZ

== Works ==
=== Poetry ===
- ich kann diese stelle nicht wiederfinden. kookbooks, Idstein 2011, ISBN 978-3-937445-46-5.
- was weißt du schon von prärie. kookbooks, Berlin 2015, ISBN 978-3-937445-73-1.
- Auszug aus Eden. Verlag Peter Engstler, Ostheim an der Rhön 2019, ISBN 978-3-946685-24-1.
- Nach Eden. Gedicht. Suhrkamp, Berlin 2024, ISBN 978-3-518-43189-4.

=== Translations ===
- Rozalie Hirs: gestammelte werke (Dutch: gestamelde werken). kookbooks, Berlin 2017, ISBN 978-3-937445-67-0. Multilingual edition. German translation: Rozalie Hirs, Daniela Seel, Ard Posthuma; English translation: Donald Gardner, Ko Kooman, Willem Groenwegen, Moze Jacobs; Chinese translation: Aurea Sison; Spanish translation: Diego Puls; Albanian translation: Anton Papleka; Shwedish translation: Boerje Bohlin; Serbo-Croatian translation: Jelica Novaković, Radovan Lučić; Litvian translation: Ausra Gudaviciute, Gytis Norvilas; Russian translation: Nina Targan Mouravi.
- Robert Macfarlane: Die verlorenen Wörter (The Lost Words). Matthes & Seitz, Berlin 2021, ISBN 978-3-95757-622-4.
- Anne Boyer: Die Unsterblichen. Körper, Krankheit, Kapitalismus (The Undying: Pain, vulnerability, mortality, medicine, art, time, dreams, data, exhaustion, cancer, and care). Matthes & Seitz, Berlin 2021. ISBN 978-3-7518-0316-8.
- Alexis Pauline Gumbs: Unertrunken. Was ich als Schwarze Feministin von Meeressäugetieren lernte (Undrowned: Black Feminist Lessons from Marine Mammals). AKI Verlag, Zürich 2021. ISBN 978-3-311-70386-0.
- Amanda Gorman (in collaboration with Marion Kraft): Call Us What We Carry ‒ Was wir mit uns tragen. Hoffmann und Campe, Hamburg 2022. ISBN 978-3-455-01172-2.

== Awards ==
- 2006: Kurt Wolff Prize: advancement award for her publishing house kookbooks
- 2007: Horst Bienek Prize for Poetry – advancement award
- 2008: Scholarship of the Senate of Berlin
- 2011: Friedrich-Hölderlin-Preis – advancement award
- 2011: Ernst-Meister-Preis für Lyrik – advancement award
- 2011: Art Prize for Literature of the Land Brandenburg Lotto GmbH
- 2012: Scholarship of the Brandenburger Tor Foundation for a residence in Split
- 2013: Translators' House Wales residency at Tŷ Newydd
- 2014: Scholarship of the Writer in Residence Programme of the Goethe-Instituts in Reykjavík
- 2015: Research scholarship of the Senate of Berlin
- 2015: Villa Aurora fellow
- 2016: Scholarship at the Künstlerhof Schreyahn
- 2017: Mondsee Poetry Prize
- 2019: 1. German Publishing Prize – premium prize
- 2023: Heimrad Bäcker Prize
- 2023: Deutscher Literaturfonds scholarship
- 2025 Kleist Prize
