= Oswald Egger =

Italian author

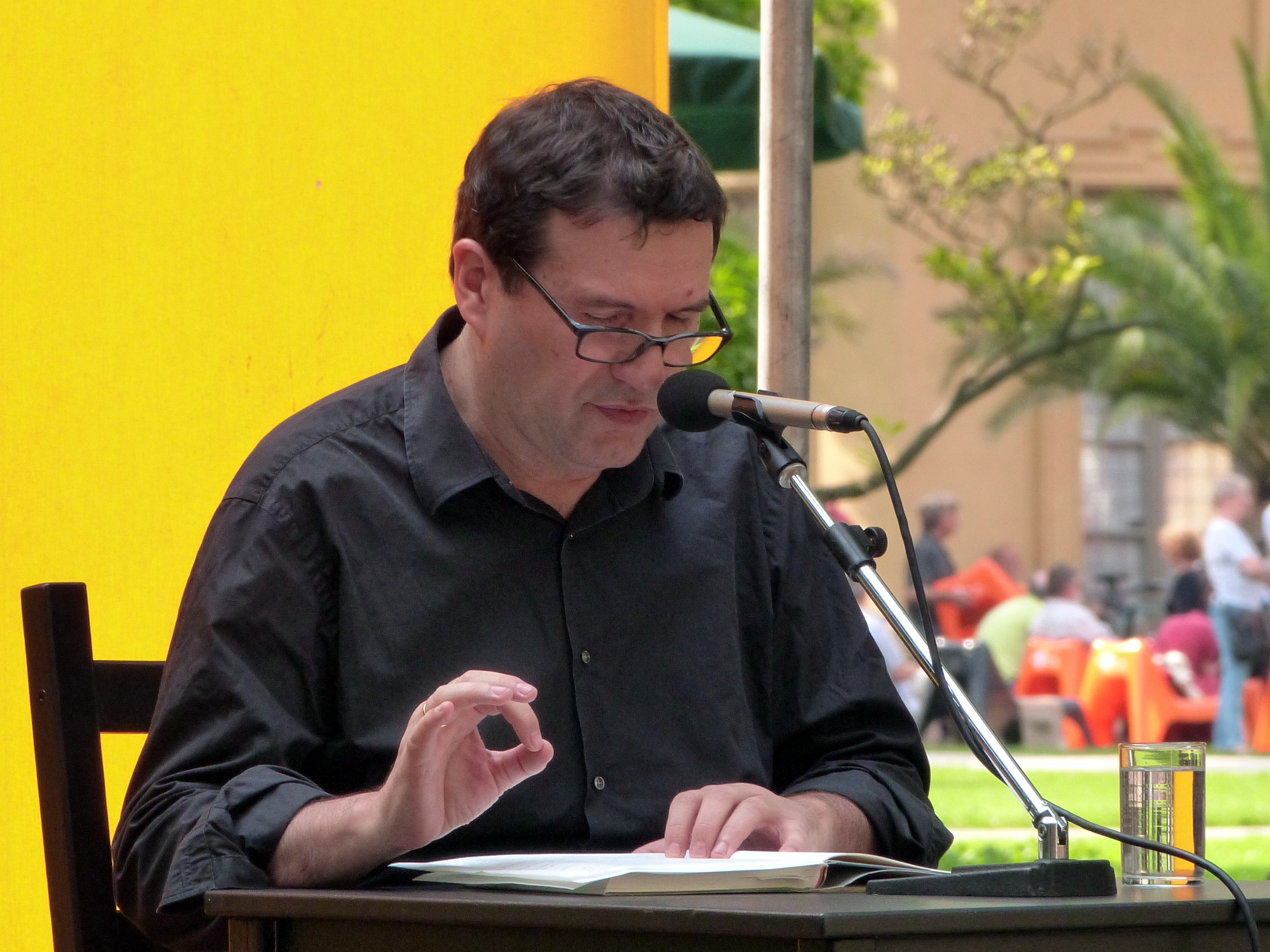
Egger in 2017

Oswald Egger is a South Tyrolean (Italy) lyricist and writer in the German language. He is the 2024 recipient of the Georg Büchner Prize, which is "considered the most important literary award in the Germanophone language area".

== Life and education ==
Egger was born in Lana, South Tyrol, in 1963. He lives, like many other South Tyrolean intellectuals, in Vienna, Austria. In 1992 he completed his "Magister phil." (M.A.) in German Studies and Philosophy at the University of Vienna.

== Works ==
Widely known by literati as a poet, Egger has also written prose texts.

- Die Erde der Rede. Gedicht. Kleinheinrich, 1993. ISBN 978-3-926608-79-6
- Gleich und Gleich. Edition Howeg, 1995. ISBN 978-3-85736-128-9
- Blaubarts Treue. Edition Howeg, 1997. ISBN 978-3-85736-144-9
- Juli, September, August. Edition Solitude, 1997. ISBN 978-3-929085-40-2
- Herde der Rede. Poem. Suhrkamp, Frankfurt am Main 1999. ISBN 978-3-518-12109-2
- Nichts, das ist. Gedichte. Suhrkamp, 2001. ISBN 978-3-518-12269-3
- -broich. Homotopien eines Gedichts. Edition Korrespondenzen, 2003. ISBN 978-3-902113-20-7
- Prosa, Proserpina, Prosa. Suhrkamp, 2005. ISBN 978-3-518-12392-8
- Tag und Nacht sind zwei Jahre. Kalendergedichte. Ulrich Keicher, Warmbronn 2006. ISBN 978-3-938743-31-7
- nihilum album. Lieder & Gedichte. Suhrkamp, 2007. ISBN 978-3-518-41871-0
- Lustrationen. Vom poetischen Tun. Suhrkamp, 2008. ISBN 978-3-518-12489-5
- Diskrete Stetigkeit. Poesie und Mathematik. Suhrkamp, 2008. ISBN 978-3-518-26014-2
- Alinea. Vom Zersingen der Lieder. In: Aris Fioretos (Hrsg.): Babel. Für Werner Hamacher. Urs Engeler, Basel 2009, ISBN 978-3-938767-55-9, S. 126–133.
- Die ganze Zeit. Suhrkamp, 2010. ISBN 978-3-518-42133-8
- Euer Lenz Prosa. Suhrkamp, 2013. ISBN 978-3-518-42351-6
- Gnomen und Amben. Brueterich Press, Berlin 2015, ISBN 978-3-945229-05-7.
- Harlekinsmäntel und andere Bewandtnisse. Matthes & Seitz, Berlin 2017, ISBN 978-3-95757-352-0.
- Val di Non. Suhrkamp, Berlin 2017, ISBN 978-3-518-42582-4.
- Entweder ich habe die Fahrt am Mississippi nur geträumt, oder ich träume jetzt. Mit Aquarellen des Authors. Suhrkamp, Berlin 2021, ISBN 978-3-518-42977-8.
- Welten von A–Z. Kleines Vademecum zum poetischen Tun. Lyrik Kabinett (Münchner Reden zur Poesie), München 2021. ISBN 978-3-938776-59-9.

== Works in English translation ==
- Room of Rumor: Tunings. A bilingual selection from Nichts, das ist, translated by Michael Pisaro. Green Integer, 2004. ISBN 978-1-931243-66-7

== Awards (selection) ==
- Georg Büchner Prize (2024)
- Georg Trakl Prize (2020)
- Karl Sczuka Prize (2013)
- H. C. Artmann Prize (2008)
- Peter Huchel Prize (2007)
