= Nadja Küchenmeister =

German poet and writer

Nadja Küchenmeister (born 18 April 1981 in East-Berlin) is a German poet and writer.

== Life and work ==
Küchenmeister grew up in Berlin where she still lives. She studied German studies and sociology at the Berlin Institute of Technology as well as creative writing at the German Institute for Literature in Leipzig. She has published poems and prose in numerous literary magazines and anthologies. Also, she has been a lecturer at the German Institute for Literature, amongst others, and works for the radio writing documentaries and radio plays. Her first poetry collection, Alle Lichter (All Lights), was published in 2010 followed by Unter dem Wacholder (Beneath the Juniper) in 2014 and Im Glasberg (In the Glass Mountain) in 2020. In collaboration with its permanent editor Matthias Kniep, she was the co-editor of the German "Jahrbuch der Lyrik" (Poetry Yearbook) in 2022.

== Critical reception ==
According to reviewer Thomas Steinfeld, Nadja Küchenmeister draws in her poetry collection Im Glasberg (In the Glass Mountain) on literary traditions such as fairy tales, whereby her verses show a great confidence not only in the poetic expression but also in an everyday world as a reservoir of poetic transformation. In her dialogic poetry, Steinfeld encounters something "childlike" such as may also occur in adults when reading fairy tales, insofar as there is no sharp distinction between the self and the work, between reception and creation.

== Publications (selection) ==
=== Independent publications ===
- 2009: Nachbild. Sonderdruck. 9 Gedichte. SchwarzHandPresse, Flaach, Schweiz, ISBN 978-3-905659-18-4.
- 2010: Alle Lichter. Gedichte. Schöffling & Co., Frankfurt am Main, ISBN 978-3-89561-225-1.
- 2014: Unter dem Wacholder. Gedichte. Schöffling & Co., Frankfurt am Main, ISBN 978-3-89561-226-8.
- 2020: Im Glasberg. Gedichte. Schöffling & Co., Frankfurt am Main, ISBN 978-3-89561-227-5.
- 2025: Der Große Wagen. Gedicht. Schöffling & Co., Frankfurt am Main, ISBN 978-3-89561-413-2.

=== Radio work ===
- Drehpunkt (Hörspiel), Ursendung 2009, SWR 2.
- Brillanz ist gar nichts. Schriftsteller und ihre Krisen (Feature, in collaboration with Norbert Hummelt), Ursendung 2013, WDR 3.
- Sprich mir nach (Hörspiel, in collaboration with Norbert Hummelt), Ursendung 2014, SWR2.
- Der Schriftsteller ohne Ort (Feature), Ursendung 2017, Deutschlandfunk Kultur.
- "Alles, was ich schreibe, war einmal wirkliches Leben" (Feature), Ursendung 2018, Deutschlandfunk Kultur.
- Wohin mit dem Elend, wohin mit dem Leid? Krieg und Literatur (Feature), Ursendung 2019, NDR Kultur.
- Die Wirklichkeit macht immer mit. Ein Besuch bei dem Schriftsteller Jürgen Becker (Feature), Ursendung 2022, Deutschlandfunk Kultur.
- Und was verdient man da so? Schriftsteller und Geld (Feature), Ursendung 2022, Deutschlandfunk Kultur.
- Poetischer Störfaktor. Die Zukunft der Lyrikkritik (Feature), Ursendung 2023, Deutschlandfunk Kultur.

== Awards ==
- 2007: Scholarship of the Senate of Berlin
- 2009: Scholarship of the Cultural foundation of Saxony
- 2010: Scholarship of the Hermann-Lenz-Preis
- 2010: Art Prize for Literature of the Land Brandenburg Lotto GmbH
- 2010: Mondsee Poetry Prize
- 2012: Scholarship of the Foundation Preußische Seehandlung
- 2012: Ulla Hahn Authors Prize of the city of Monheim am Rhein
- 2012: Literature Prize of the Stahlstiftung Eisenhüttenstadt
- 2014: Rainer Malkowski Scholarship
- 2014: Horst-Bingel-Prize for Literature
- 2015: Advancement award of the Literaturpreis der Stadt Bremen
- 2016: Residency granted by the International Artists' House Villa Concordia in Bamberg
- 2022: Basel Poetry Prize
- 2025: Bettina-Brentano-Preis for contemporary Poetry
- 2026: Peter Huchel Prize for Der Große Wagen
- 2026: Literature Prize of the A und A Kulturstiftung
