= Deutsche Akademie für Sprache und Dichtung =

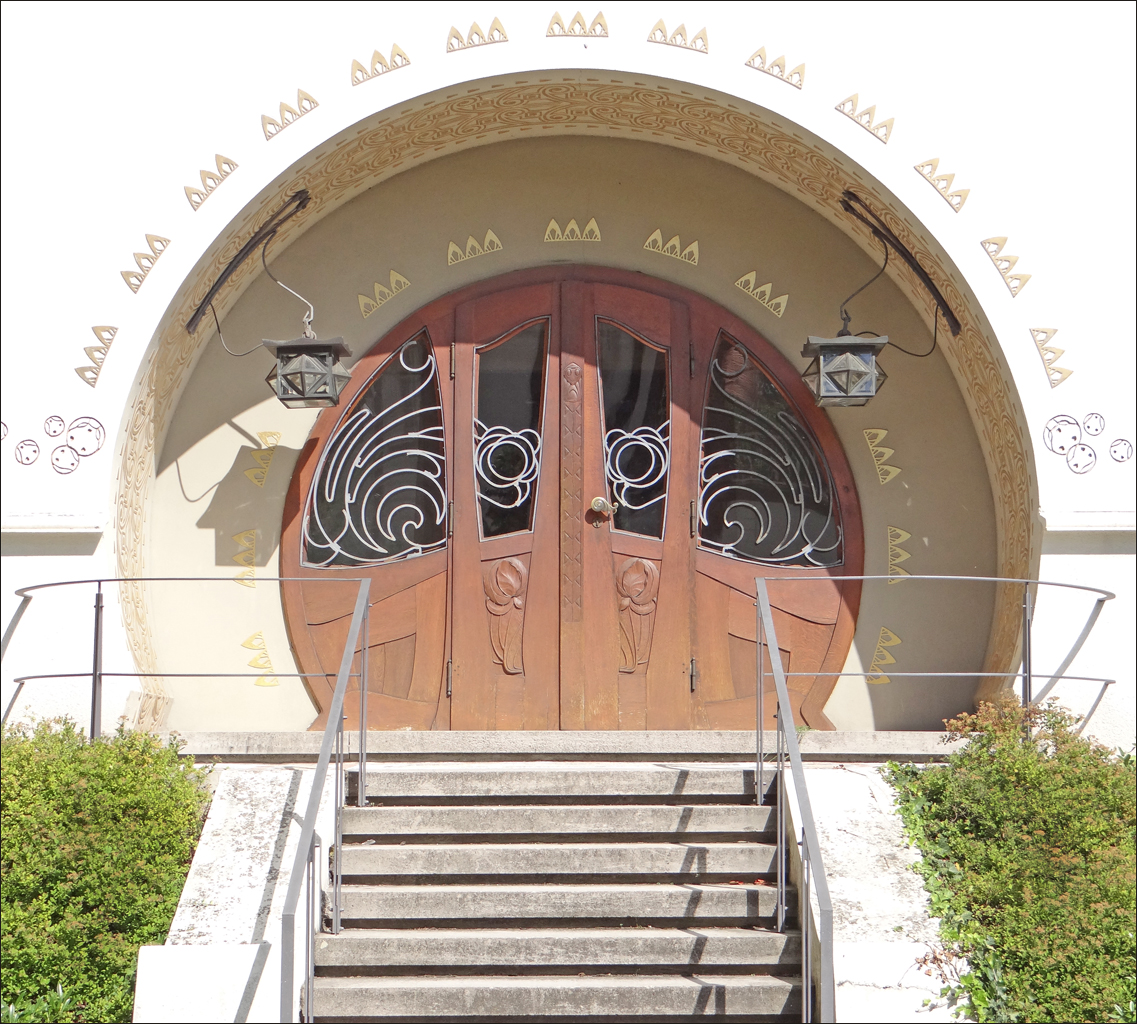
- Established: 28 August 1949 (76 years ago)
- Founders: Oskar Jancke
- Founded at: St. Paul's Church
- Types: voluntary association
- Headquarters: Darmstadt
- Country: Germany
- Official Languages: German language
- Chairpersons: Ingo Schulze
- Website: www.deutscheakademie.de

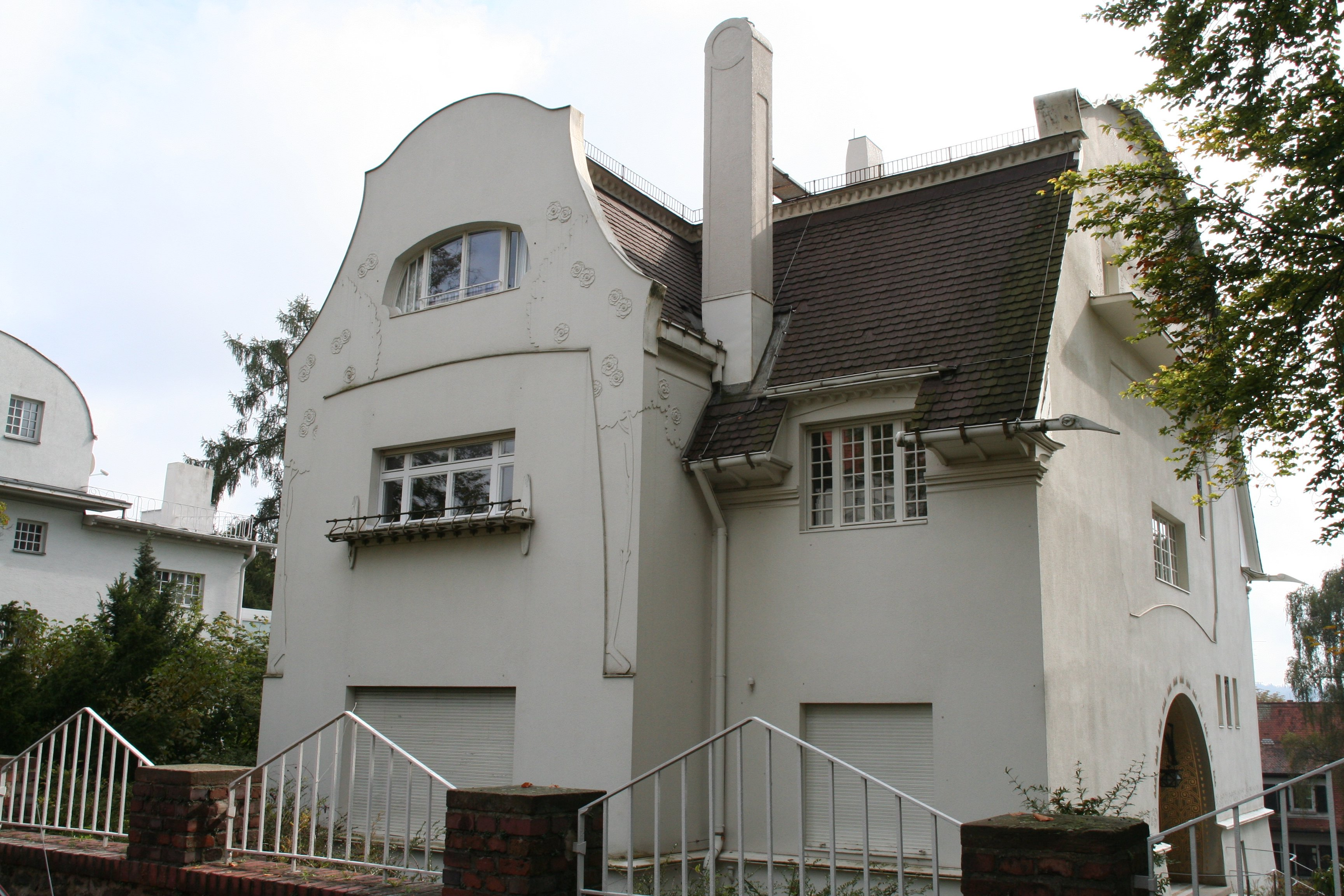
The large Glückert House, seat of the German Academy for Language and Literature

The Deutsche Akademie für Sprache und Dichtung (in English German Academy for Language and Literature) was founded on 28 August 1949, on the 200th birthday of Johann Wolfgang von Goethe, in the Paulskirche in Frankfurt. It is seated in Darmstadt, since 1971 in the Glückert House at the Darmstadt Artists' Colony. It is a society of writers and scholars on matters pertaining to German language and literature in the Deutsche sprachraum, or Germanosphere.

== Conferences ==
- Spring conference at changing locations in Germany and abroad
- Autumn conference in Darmstadt

== Literary awards ==
- Since 1951 it has awarded the Georg Büchner Prize, the most important literary prize in the German language (awarded at autumn conference).
- The Sigmund Freud Prize, was instituted in memory of Sigmund Freud in 1964 (awarded at autumn conference).
- That same year, the annual Friedrich-Gundolf-Preis was instituted for the promotion of German culture in foreign countries, in memory of Friedrich Gundolf (awarded at spring conference).
- Johann-Heinrich-Merck-Preis (awarded at autumn conference)
- Johann-Heinrich-Voß-Preis für Übersetzung (awarded at spring conference)

== Notable members ==
- Ilse Aichinger
- Hannah Arendt
- Ingeborg Bachmann
- Lukas Bärfuss
- Jurek Becker
- Gottfried Benn
- Thomas Bernhard
- Heinrich Böll
- Nicolas Born
- Pierre Boulez
- Volker Braun
- Joseph Breitbach
- Alfred Brendel
- Carl Dahlhaus
- Heimito von Doderer
- Tankred Dorst
- Friedrich Dürrenmatt
- Adolf Endler
- Péter Esterházy
- Max Frisch
- Hans-Georg Gadamer
- Lars Gustafsson
- Jürgen Habermas
- Hans Werner Henze
- Theodor Heuss
- Ernst Jandl
- Elfriede Jelinek
- Walter Jens
- Uwe Johnson
- Erich Kästner
- Hermann Kasack
- Hermann Kesten
- Thomas Kling
- Karl Krolow
- Elisabeth Langgässer
- Hermann Lenz
- Siegfried Lenz
- Golo Mann
- Robert Menasse
- Terézia Mora
- Herta Müller
- Adolf Muschg
- Christoph Ransmayr
- Jan Philipp Reemtsma
- Erich Maria Remarque
- Wolfgang Rihm
- Oda Schaefer
- Wolfdietrich Schnurre
- Saša Stanišić
- Hans Heinz Stuckenschmidt
- Martin Walser
- Carl Friedrich von Weizsäcker
- Christa Wolf
- Adam Zagajewski
- Carl Zuckmayer
