= Thomas Kling =

German poet (1957–2005)

Thomas Kling (June 5, 1957 – April 1, 2005) was a German poet.

== Life ==
Thomas Kling was born in Bingen am Rhein, grew up in Hilden and went to school in Düsseldorf. He studied philology in Cologne, Düsseldorf and Vienna and lived in Finland for a certain period. Since 1983 he presented his poems on public performances – first in Vienna, than in the Rhineland. Later he performed together with the jazz percussionist Frank Köllges.

Kling lived with his wife Ute Langanky, a painter, on the museum area of Hombroich (a former rocket station) near Neuss. In 2005 he died in Dormagen of lung cancer. He was buried in Neuss-Holzheim.

== Poetry ==
Thomas Kling was an important poet in contemporary German literature. He was influenced by authors like Friederike Mayröcker, Ernst Jandl, Paul Celan, Hans Carl Artmann and Konrad Bayer. The structure and the layout of his poems were often dominated by the needs of his performances. He was member of the German PEN-centre and of the Deutsche Akademie für Sprache und Dichtung (German Academy for Language and Poetry).

== Awards ==
- 1986: Förderpreis für Literatur der Landeshauptstadt Düsseldorf in Northrhine-Westphalia
- 1989: Promotion Prize of Northrhine-Westphalia
- 1990: Rolf Dieter Brinkmann Grant of Cologne
- 1991: Promotion Prize of the arts circle in the Federal Association of German Industry
- 1993: Else Lasker Schüler Prize for Poetry
- 1997: Peter Huchel Prize
- 2001: Ernst Jandl Prize
- 2005: Poetry Prize of the Stadtsparkasse Düsseldorf

== Works ==
- der zustand vor dem untergang (the situation before the breakup), Düsseldorf 1977
- erprobung herzstärkender mittel (testing of heart strengthening means), Düsseldorf 1986
- geschmacksverstärker (flavour enhancer), Frankfurt am Main 1989
- verkehrsfunk (traffic message channel), 1989
- brennstabm (fuel rod / fuel rodz), Frankfurt am Main 1991
- nacht.sicht.gerät (night.vision.device), Frankfurt am Main 1993
- wände machn (making walls / makin walls), Münster 1994
- morsch (decayed), Frankfurt am Main 1996
- Itinerar (itinerary), Frankfurt am Main 1997
- Wolkenstein. Mobilisierun' (claude stone. mobilisatio', Münster 1997
- GELÄNDE camouflage (terrain camouflage), Münster 1997 (together with Ute Langanky)
- Fernhandel (long distance trade), Köln 1999
- Botenstoffe (messenger substrates), Köln 2001
- Sondagen (sondages), Köln 2002
- Auswertung der Flugdaten (analysis of flight data), Köln 2005
- Gesammelte Gedichte (collected poems), Köln 2006
- Das brennende Archiv - Brevier. (ed. Ute Langanky and Norbert Wehr). Suhrkamp, Berlin 2012 (= suhrkamp taschenbuch 4351), ISBN 978-3-518-46351-2.

== Editor ==
- Friederike Mayröcker: Benachbarte Metalle, Frankfurt am Main 1998
- Sabine Scho: Thomas Kling entdeckt Sabine Scho, Hamburg [u.a.] 2001
- Sprachspeicher. 200 Gedichte auf deutsch vom achten bis zum zwanzigsten Jahrhundert, Köln 2001

== Translations ==
- Gaius Valerius Catullus: Das Haar der Berenice, Ostfildern vor Stuttgart 1997

== Literature ==
- Heinz-Norbert Jocks: Thomas Kling. Bilderfindungen, Un entretien de Heinz-Norbert Jocks, revised in: Schreibheft. Zeitschrift für Literatur, Edition 96, Essen 2021, p. 146-155.
- Heinz-Norbert Jocks: Bilderfindungen, Ein Gespräch mit Thomas Kling, in: Kunstforum International, Cologne 1998, No. 140, p. 238–253.
- Heinz-Norbert Jocks: Wörter aus dem Vulkan, In: General-Anzeiger, Bonn 1994,23./24. July 1994.
- Heinz-Norbert Jocks: Das Genie, In: Überblick Magazin, Düsseldorf, 1986, Edition 11, November, p. 36–38.
- Heinz-Norbert Jocks: Ein Wahlverwandter der Dadaisten, In: Düsseldorfer Hefte, Düsseldorf, 1986, 1. October 1986, Edition 11, p. 13-14.
