= Peter Waterhouse (writer) =

Austrian writer and translator (born 1956)

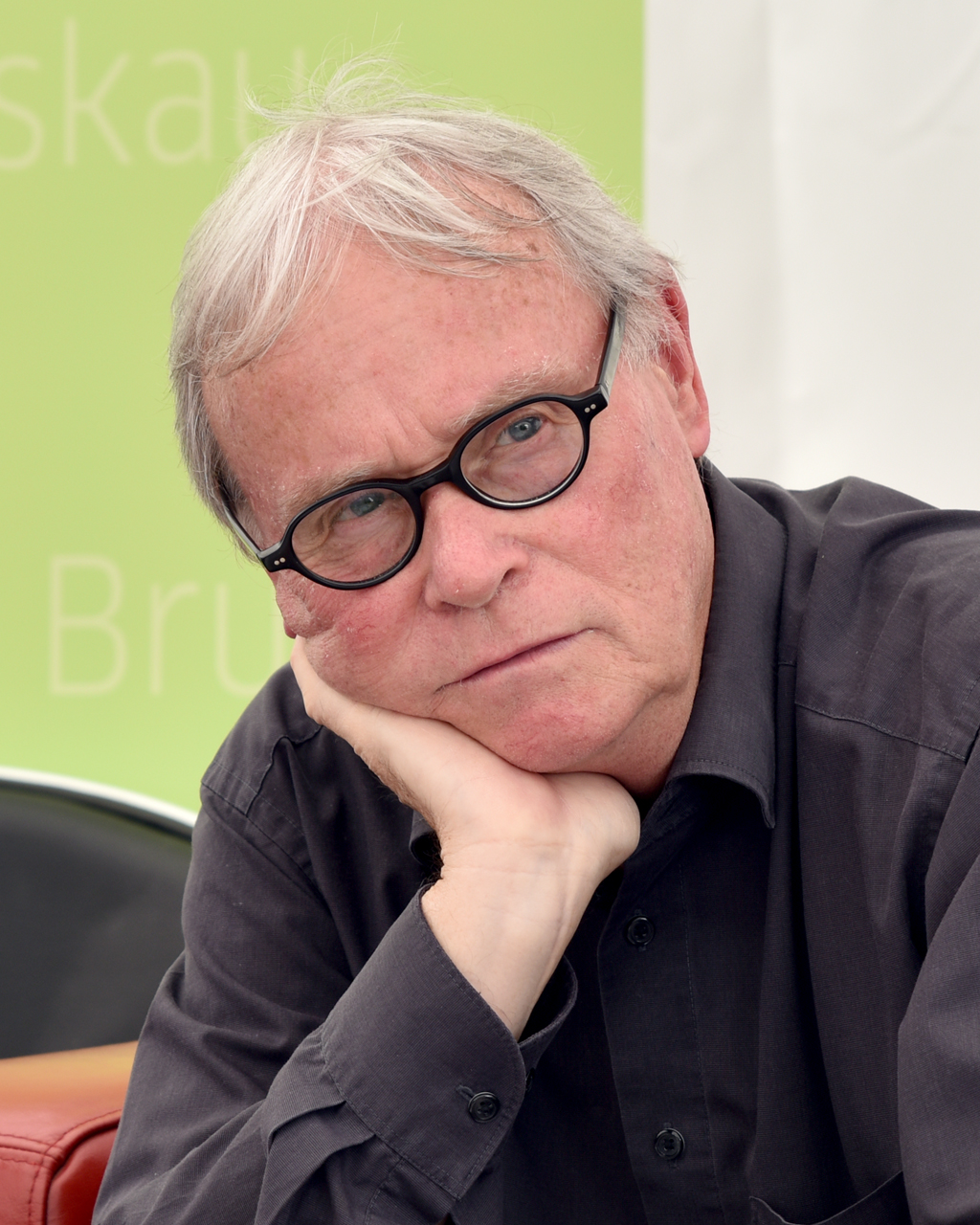
Peter Waterhouse in 2022

Peter Waterhouse (March 24, 1956) is an Austrian writer and translator.

Born to a British father and an Austrian mother, he studied German and English literature at the University of Vienna, and later in Los Angeles, where he completed a PhD on Paul Celan. He has won a number of important literary prizes, including the manuskripte prize (1990), the Heimito von Doderer Prize (1997), the Austrian State Prize for Translation (2002), the H.C. Artmann Prize (2004), and the Erich Fried Prize (2007).

He translates poetry into German from both English and Italian.
