= Deutsche Schillerstiftung =

German literary foundation

The Deutsche Schillerstiftung (German Schiller Foundation), headquartered in Weimar, is the oldest private foundation for the assistance of writers in Germany, founded in 1855. It was refounded in 1995 as the Deutsche Schillerstiftung von 1859 (1859 German Schiller Foundation). It presents several awards and prizes for literary achievement and has since its foundation has assisted writers in financial emergencies or other pressing situations.
