= Michael Maar =

German literary scholar, germanist and author

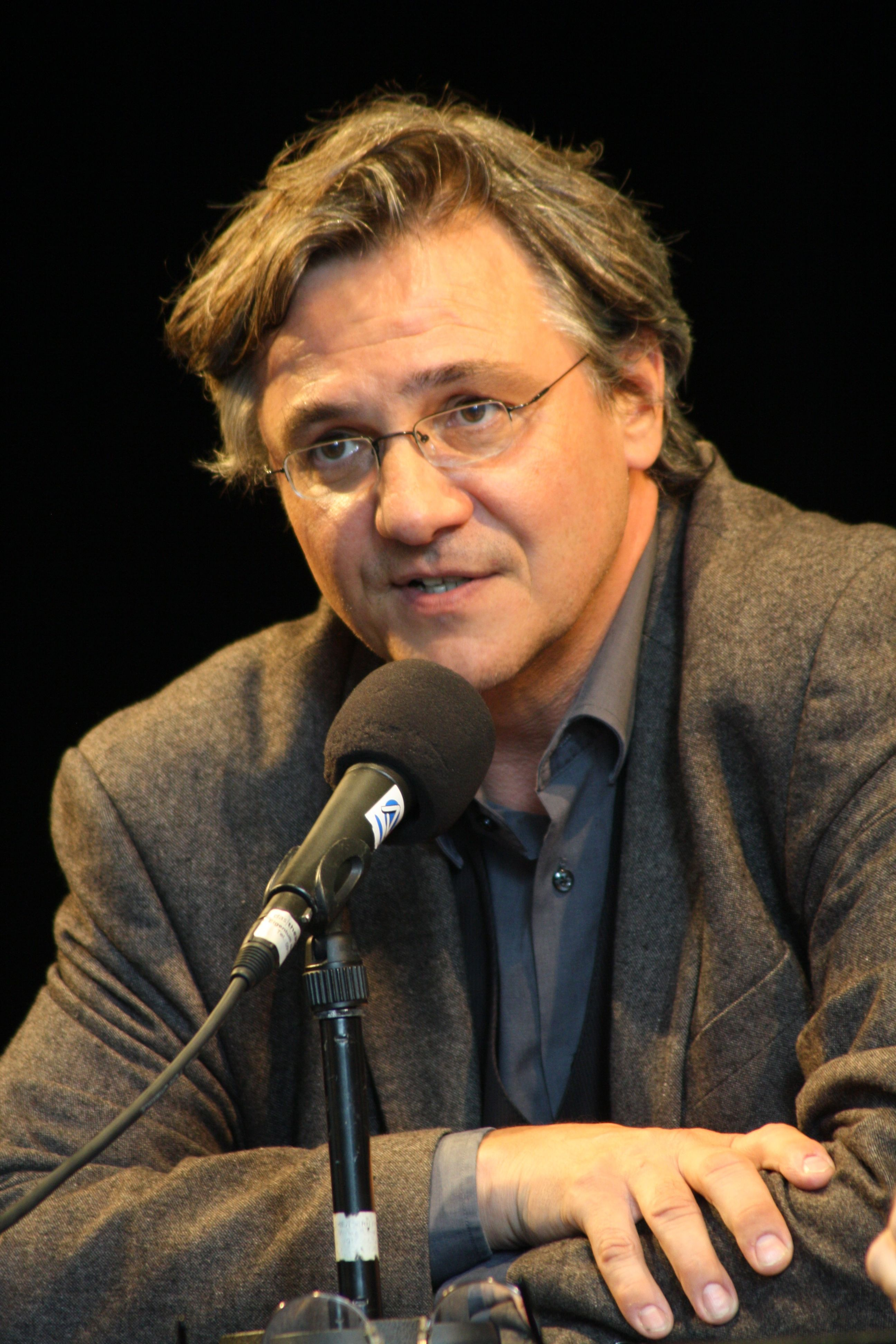
- Maar in 2012
- Born: 17 July 1960 (age 66); Stuttgart, Baden-Württemberg, Germany
- Occupations: Literary scholar; Germanist; author
- Parent: Paul Maar (father)
- Writing career
- Notable awards: Johann-Heinrich-Merck-Preis (1995); Ernst-Robert-Curtius-Preis (1995) Heinrich Mann Prize (2010)

Michael Maar (born 17 July 1960 in Stuttgart) is a German literary scholar, Germanist and author.

For his 1995 doctoral dissertation on Thomas Mann, titled Geister und Kunst, he was awarded the Johann Heinrich Merck Prize by the Deutsche Akademie für Sprache und Dichtung. He was himself elected a member of the academy in 2002. He was a Fellow of the Wissenschaftskolleg zu Berlin from 1997 to 1998, and visiting professor at Stanford University in 2002. From 2005 to 2006 he was a Fellow of the Carl Friedrich von Siemens Stiftung. In 2008, he became a member of the Bayerische Akademie der Schönen Künste.

His 2005 book The Two Lolitas, as well as two articles in the Frankfurter Allgemeine Zeitung and The Times Literary Supplement the previous year, argued that Vladimir Nabokov's 1955 novel Lolita was most likely based on an until-then little known 1916 short story by German author Heinz von Lichberg, also titled Lolita and featuring an identical theme. The discovery received strong attention by literary critics and the world press. Maar did not himself accuse Nabokov of plagiarism, but suggested it was a case of cryptomnesia, arguing that Nabokov and Lichberg lived in the same part of Berlin for several years in the 1920s and 1930s and that Lichberg's 1916 book (a collection of short stories) was easily available at the time.

His father is the author Paul Maar.

== Selected bibliography ==
=== English ===
- Bluebeard’s chamber; guilt and confession in Thomas Mann, translated by David Fernbach, London; New York, Verso, 2003. ISBN 1-85984-529-0
- The Two Lolitas, translated by Perry Anderson, London, Verso, 2005. ISBN 1-84467-038-4

=== German ===
- Bild und Text: literarische Texte im Unterricht. Goethe-Institut, München, Ref. 42, Arbeitsstelle für Wiss. Didaktik. Hrsg. von Michael Maar u. Paul Maar. Lernhinweise von Jutta Weisz. 1988
- Geister und Kunst. Neuigkeiten aus dem Zauberberg. 1995
- Die Feuer- und die Wasserprobe. Essays zur Literatur. 1997
- Die falsche Madeleine. Essays. 1999
- Marcel Proust. Zwischen Belle Époque und Moderne (Herausgeber und Kommentar) 1999
- Das Blaubart-Zimmer. Thomas Mann und die Schuld. 2000 (Üb. ins Englische: Bluebeard’s Chamber. Guilt and Confession in Thomas Mann, London 2003)
- Warum Nabokov Harry Potter gemocht hätte. 2002, ISBN 3-8270-0454-3
- Die Glühbirne der Etrusker. Essays und Marginalien. 2003
- Lolita und der deutsche Leutnant. Essay. 2005
- Leoparden im Tempel. Zu Andersen, Borges, Canetti, Chesterton, Kafka, Lampedusa, Mann, Musil, Nabokov, Powell, Proust, Woolf. 2007
- Solus Rex. Die schöne böse Welt des Vladimir Nabokov. 2007
- Hilfe für die Hufflepuffs. Kleines Handbuch zu Harry Potter. 2008, ISBN 978-3-446-23020-0
- Proust Pharao. 2009, ISBN 978-3-937834-34-4
- Das violette Hündchen, 2025, ISBN 978-3-498-00291-6

== Awards ==
- Johann-Heinrich-Merck-Preis (1995)
- Ernst-Robert-Curtius-Preis (1995)
- Essay-Stipendium der Stiftung Niedersachsen (1998)
- Lessing-Preis für Kritik (2000)
- Essay-Stipendium Baden-Württemberg (2001)
- Heinrich Mann Prize (2010)
