= Pictures of Your True Love =

2014 unfinished novel written by Wolfgang Herrndorf

Pictures Of Your True Love
- First German edition cover
- Editor: Marcus Gärtner; Kathrin Passig
- Author: Wolfgang Herrndorf
- Original title: Bilder deiner großen Liebe: Ein unvollendeter Roman
- Language: German
- Genre: Coming of age, adventure
- Set in: Germany
- Publisher: Rowohlt Verlag
- Publication date: 13 November 2014
- Publication place: Germany
- Media type: Print (hardback and paperback)
- Pages: 144 (unfinished)
- ISBN: 978-3-87134-791-7
- Preceded by: Arbeit und Struktur

Pictures Of Your True Love (subtitle: An unfinished novel) is a novel fragment written by Wolfgang Herrndorf, which was published posthumously. The book was published by Marcus Gärtner and Kathrin Passig in Rowohlt Verlag in 2014. It is a sequel to the novel Why We Took the Car but from the protagonist Isa Schmidt's point of view in the form of a road novel but on foot.

== Plot ==
Isa, the 14-year-old first-person narrator, escapes from a mental hospital. She hitchhikes her way to a village where she steals food from a grocery shop. Whilst shoplifting the food she sustains laceration wounds. She spends the night in a cornfield and has a shower under the lawn sprinkler of a football pitch, where she does not go undiscovered as the football team finds her. An abandoned house then inspires her; she makes up a story, in which she is the protagonist, waiting for her husband to return from war.

Following this, she obtains unauthorised access onto a barge, after the captain initially denies her access. He bandages her feet and tells her his life story, in particular about a bank robbery from ages ago. After a promised nightcap and before the captain can notify the police at a water lock, Isa successfully escapes and she finds a bag belonging to a man who had killed himself.

Subsequently, we learn how she is followed by a boy who, according to a sign, is deaf-mute but who she nevertheless chats to because he does not want to let her go. She tells him a story of a dog who was abandoned on a Spanish holiday and who ran all the way back to Germany to his master. Then she describes several short scenes: a passer-by who gives her a sandwich; watching two homeless people and the encounter with a construction worker, who recognizes his first love in her.

Eventually, she notices a man mowing the lawn in his garden and offers him her assistance. The writer accepts and rewards her with some of his daughter's clothes. Along with the clothes, Isa also steals a satchel. In one of the rooms, she finds a gaunt woman with little hair left on her head, who apparently cannot tell Isa apart from her daughter Angela. Isa inconspicuously leaves the house through a window in the roof. On her way, she passes through a forest, where she unsuccessfully asks other hikers for food. Finally, she comes across a dead stag and a dead man from whom she takes a pistol and 50 Euros. The next night, Isa stays at a run-down hotel.

After that, she describes how she hitched a lift with an animal transporter. At a stop, the driver uncovers his genitalia, but that does not stop her from giving the pigs, which are being transported, fresh water.

She is then on foot once again and her journey this time takes her to a rubbish dump. There she finds a box for the pistol and the diary and meets two young people, whom she helps steal petrol from a car in a nearby petrol station. In exchange they take her with them in their car. At the end of the book, a scene in the mountains is described where she is standing near the edge of a mountain and shoots the pistol in the air and the bullet falls exactly back into the barrel.

== Afterword ==
In the afterword, the novel's editors Marcus Gärtner and Kathrin Passig describe the making of the manuscript by quoting Herrndorf's blog "Arbeit und Struktur" saying it was an idea of a sequel to the novel Why We Took The Car, which was discarded at first. When he started working on it again, he was unable to finish it by himself due to his poor health. With no-one willing to co-author the novel with him, shortly before his death Herrndorf agreed the novel could be published, with an explanatory afterword,. He decided on the title himself.

The two decided on which passages to publish, elaborated on passages that had only analogously been written down, and decided on the order of the passages. Further, they inserted connecting passages and reduced the two original lorry drivers to one.

== Critique ==
…., in such a ground-breaking way and out of the literary habitualness, so that you now want to compare it to really highbrow German literature comparisons, as well as joining the novel fragment in the league of the world known misfit novels: Isa is as crazy as Büchner’s Lenz, so lost like Robert Walser’s Jakob von Gunten, and so sensitive and cold like Camus’ Fremder.

— Die Zeit

Just like with his masterpiece, the desert novel ‘Sand’, you get with this, roughly 130 page long, reading the impression that this book is looking for one’s own kind in the German speaking contemporary literature. That it is unique yet so messed up, sick and off target, especially in relation to the dialogs. Full of poetry, beauty, dream like past, grief, charisma, and contrariwise humour.

— Der Tagesspiegel

== Editions ==
- Wolfgang Herrndorf: Bilder deiner großen Liebe: Ein unvollendeter Roman. Published by Marcus Gärtner and Kathrin Passig. Rowohlt, Berlin 2014, ISBN 978-3-87134-791-7; Rowohlt Taschenbuch, Reinbek 2015, ISBN 978-3-499-26909-7.
