= Leipzig Book Fair Prize =

German literary award

- Native name: Preis der Leipziger Buchmesse
- Country: Germany
- Presented by: Leipzig Book Fair
- Reward: €20,000 per category
- Website: http://www.preis-der-leipziger-buchmesse.de/

The Leipzig Book Fair Prize (Preis der Leipziger Buchmesse) is a literary award assigned annually during the Leipzig Book Fair to outstanding newly released literary works in the categories "Fiction", "Non-fiction" and "Translation". The Leipzig Book Fair Prize has been awarded since the Deutscher Bücherpreis was ceased in 2005, and is one of the most important literary awards in Germany. The winner in each category is awarded €20,000.

== Leipzig Book Fair Prize ==
Year	Category	Recipient	Title	Original title	Original author
2005	Fiction	Terézia Mora	Alle Tage	—N/a	—N/a
2005	Non-fiction	Rüdiger Safranski	Schiller oder Die Erfindung des Deutschen Idealismus	—N/a	—N/a
2005	Translation	Thomas Eichhorn	Fredy Neptune		(Australia) Les Murray
2006	Fiction	Ilija Trojanow	Der Weltensammler	—N/a	—N/a
2006	Non-fiction	Franz Schuh	Schwere Vorwürfe, schmutzige Wäsche	—N/a	—N/a
2006	Translation	Ragni Maria Gschwend	Aufbrüche	Gli esordi	(Italy) Antonio Moresco
2007	Fiction	Ingo Schulze	Handy	—N/a	—N/a
2007	Non-fiction	Saul Friedländer	Das Dritte Reich und die Juden. Die Jahre der Vernichtung 1939–1945	—N/a	—N/a
2007	Translation	Svetlana Geier	Ein grüner Junge	Подросток	(Russia) Fyodor Dostoyevsky
2008	Fiction	Clemens Meyer	Die Nacht, die Lichter	—N/a	—N/a
2008	Non-fiction	Irina Liebmann	Wäre es schön? Es wäre schön!	—N/a	—N/a
2008	Translation	Fritz Vogelgsang	Der Roman vom Weißen Ritter Tirant lo Blanc	Tirant lo Blanc	(Crown of Aragon) Joanot Martorell
2009	Fiction	Sibylle Lewitscharoff	Apostoloff	—N/a	—N/a
2009	Non-fiction	Herfried Münkler	Die Deutschen und ihre Mythen	—N/a	—N/a
2009	Translation	Eike Schönfeld	Humboldts Vermächtnis	Humboldt's Gift	(United States) (Canada) Saul Bellow
2010	Fiction	Georg Klein	Roman unserer Kindheit	—N/a	—N/a
2010	Non-fiction	Ulrich Raulff	Kreis ohne Meister: Stefan Georges Nachleben	—N/a	—N/a
2010	Translation	Ulrich Blumenbach	Unendlicher Spaß	Infinite Jest	(United States) David Foster Wallace
2011	Fiction	Clemens J. Setz	Die Liebe zur Zeit des Mahlstädter Kindes	—N/a	—N/a
2011	Non-fiction	Henning Ritter	Notizhefte	—N/a	—N/a
2011	Translation	Barbara Conrad	Krieg und Frieden	Война и мир	(Russia) Leo Tolstoy
2012	Fiction	Wolfgang Herrndorf	Sand	—N/a	—N/a
2012	Non-fiction	Jörg Baberowski	Verbrannte Erde: Stalins Herrschaft der Gewalt	—N/a	—N/a
2012	Translation	Christina Viragh	Parallelgeschichten	Párhuzamos történetek	(Hungary) Péter Nádas
2013	Fiction	David Wagner	Leben	—N/a	—N/a
2013	Non-fiction	Helmut Böttiger	Die Gruppe 47: Als die deutsche Literatur Geschichte schrieb	—N/a	—N/a
2013	Translation	Eva Hesse	Die Cantos	The Cantos	(United States) Ezra Pound
2014	Fiction	Saša Stanišić	Vor dem Fest	—N/a	—N/a
2014	Non-fiction	Helmut Lethen	Der Schatten des Fotografen	—N/a	—N/a
2014	Translation	Robin Detje	Europe Central		(United States) William T. Vollmann
2015	Fiction	Jan Wagner	Regentonnenvariationen	—N/a	—N/a
2015	Non-fiction	Philipp Ther	Die neue Ordnung auf dem alten Kontinent	—N/a	—N/a
2015	Translation	Mirjam Pressler	Judas	הבשורה על-פי יהודה	(Israel) Amos Oz
2016	Fiction	Guntram Vesper	Frohburg	—N/a	—N/a
2016	Non-fiction	Jürgen Goldstein	Georg Forster: Zwischen Freiheit und Naturgewalt	—N/a	—N/a
2016	Translation	Brigitte Döbert	Die Tutoren	Тутори	(Serbia) (Croatia) Bora Ćosić
2017	Fiction	Natascha Wodin	Sie kam aus Mariupol	—N/a	—N/a
2017	Non-fiction	Barbara Stollberg-Rilinger	Maria Theresia: Die Kaiserin in ihrer Zeit	—N/a	—N/a
2017	Translation	Eva Lüdi Kong	Die Reise nach Westen	西遊記	Wu Cheng'en (presumably)
2018	Fiction	Esther Kinsky	Hain: Geländeroman	—N/a	—N/a
2018	Non-fiction	Karl Schlögel	Das sowjetische Jahrhundert: Archäologie einer untergegangenen Welt	—N/a	—N/a
2018	Translation	Sabine Stöhr and Juri Durkot	Internat	Інтернат	(Ukraine) Serhiy Zhadan
2019	Fiction	Anke Stelling	Schäfchen im Trockenen	—N/a	—N/a
2019	Non-fiction	Harald Jähner	Wolfszeit: Deutschland und die Deutschen 1945–1955	—N/a	—N/a
2019	Translation	Eva Ruth Wemme	Verlorener Morgen	Dimineață pierdută	(Romania) Gabriela Adameșteanu
2020	Fiction	Lutz Seiler	Stern 111	—N/a	—N/a
2020	Non-fiction	Bettina Hitzer	Krebs fühlen: Eine Emotionsgeschichte des 20. Jahrhundert	—N/a	—N/a
2020	Translation	Pieke Biermann	Oreo		(United States) Fran Ross
2021	Fiction	Iris Hanika	Echos Kammern	—N/a	—N/a
2021	Non-fiction	Heike Behrend	Menschwerdung eines Affen: Eine Autobiografie der ethnografischen Forschung	—N/a	—N/a
2021	Translation	Timea Tankó	Apropos Casanova: Das Brevier des Heiligen Orpheus	Széljegyzetek Casanovához	(Hungary) Miklós Szentkuthy
2022	Fiction	Tomer Gardi	Eine runde Sache	—N/a	—N/a
2022	Non-fiction	Uljana Wolf	Etymologischer Gossip: Essays und Reden	—N/a	—N/a
2022	Translation	Anne Weber	Nevermore		(France) Cécile Wajsbrot
2023	Fiction	Dinçer Güçyeter	Unser Deutschlandmärchen	—N/a	—N/a
2023	Non-fiction	Regina Scheer	Bittere Brunnen: Hertha Gordon-Walcher und der Traum von der Revolution	—N/a	—N/a
2023	Translation	Johanna Schwering	Die Cousinen	Las primas	(Argentina) Aurora Venturini
2024	Fiction	Barbi Marković	Minihorror	—N/a	—N/a
2024	Non-fiction	Tom Holert	„ca. 1972“. Gewalt – Umwelt – Identität – Methode	—N/a	—N/a
2024	Translation	Ki-Hyang Lee	Der Fluch des Hasen	저주 토끼	(South Korea) Bora Chung
2025	Fiction	Kristine Bilkau	Halbinsel	—N/a	—N/a
2025	Non-fiction	Irina Rastorgueva	Pop-up-Propaganda: Epikrise der russischen Selbstvergiftung	—N/a	—N/a
2025	Translation	Thomas Weiler	Feuerdörfer: Wehrmachtsverbrechen in Belarus – Zeitzeugen berichten	Я з вогненнай вёскі…	(Belarus) Ales Adamovich, Janka Bryl and Uladsimir Kalesnik
2026	Fiction	Katerina Poladjan	Goldstrand	—N/a	—N/a
2026	Non-fiction	Marie-Janine Calic	Balkan-Odyssee. 1933 – 1941. Auf der Flucht vor Hitler durch Südosteuropa	—N/a	—N/a
2026	Translation	Manfred Gmeiner	Unten leben	Vivir abajo	(Peru) Gustavo Faverón Patriau
