= Why We Took the Car =

2010 novel by Wolfgang Herrndorf

- First German edition cover
- Author: Wolfgang Herrndorf
- Original title: Tschick
- Language: German
- Genre: Travel, young adult, adventure
- Set in: Berlin, Germany
- Publisher: Rowohlt Verlag
- Publication date: 17 September 2023
- Publication place: Germany
- Media type: Print (hardback and paperback)
- Pages: 256
- OCLC: 1124388900
- Preceded by: In Plüschgewittern
- Followed by: Sand

Why We Took the Car (German: Tschick [ˈtʃɪk]) is a youth novel by Wolfgang Herrndorf first published in German by Rowohlt Verlag in 2010. The English edition, translated by Tim Mohr, was published by Scholastic in 2014.

It deals with the unconventional friendship between a 14-year-old middle class boy and a Russian late repatriate youngster. The novel was awarded with the Deutscher Jugendliteraturpreis (German Children's Literature Award) as well as the Clemens-Brentano-Preis in 2011. In 2012, it was also awarded with the Hans Fallada Prize. It was published in over 25 countries and sold over 2 million copies in Germany alone until September 2016.

== Intention ==
To the question why he wrote a youth novel with Tschick, Wolfgang Herrndorf answered the following in a conversation with FAZ:

I’ve reread the books of my childhood in 2004, ‘Lord of the flies’, ‘Huckleberry Finn’, ‘Arthur Gordon Pym’, ‘Pik reist nach Amerika’ and so on. I did this because I wanted to know whether they were really as good as I remembered them, but I also wanted to find out who I was as a twelve-year-old. During that process, I realized that all of my favorite books had three things in common: a quick elimination of the grown-up attachment figure, long journey, wide waters. I thought about how I could integrate these three things into a somewhat realistic youth novel. Sailing down the Elbe with a float seemed ridiculous; to sign on a ship as a runaway in the Federal Republic of Germany in the 21-century: jabberwocky. I only could think of something with a car. Two boys steal a car. The water was missing, but I had figured out the plot in a couple of minutes.

— In a conversation: Wolfgang Herrndorf, FAZ on January 31st 2011

== Plot ==
Maik Klingenberg, 14, comes from an affluent but dysfunctional family home in Marzahn, a part of eastern Berlin. His mother has a severe alcohol addiction and his father is described as a somewhat neglecting parent. Maik has no friends since his best friend Paul moved to Brandenburg. In school he is an outsider, which is why at the beginning of summer break he is not invited to the birthday party of Serbian beauty queen Tatjana Cosic whom he secretly has a crush on. Whilst on the most part considered boring, one of the few times he stands out in class is the moment he reads an essay in German class talking about his alcoholic mother with striking but loving openness. The teacher is horrified, his classmates laugh at him and call him a psycho from then on. The new classmate Andrej Tschichatschow (Tschick for short), an uncommunicative late repatriate from Russia, who sometimes shows up openly drunk to class, is also an outsider and excluded from Tatjana's birthday party.

Maik, in the hopes of still being invited, draws a picture of Beyoncé as a present for Tatjana, because the girl loves Beyoncé's music. However, the last day of school passes without anything happening. On top of that, Maik's mum has to go to a rehab clinic again while his dad wants to use that time to go on holiday with his young female assistant, telling Maik it's a business trip. It appears, at this point, that Maik will be forced to spend his summer holiday alone.

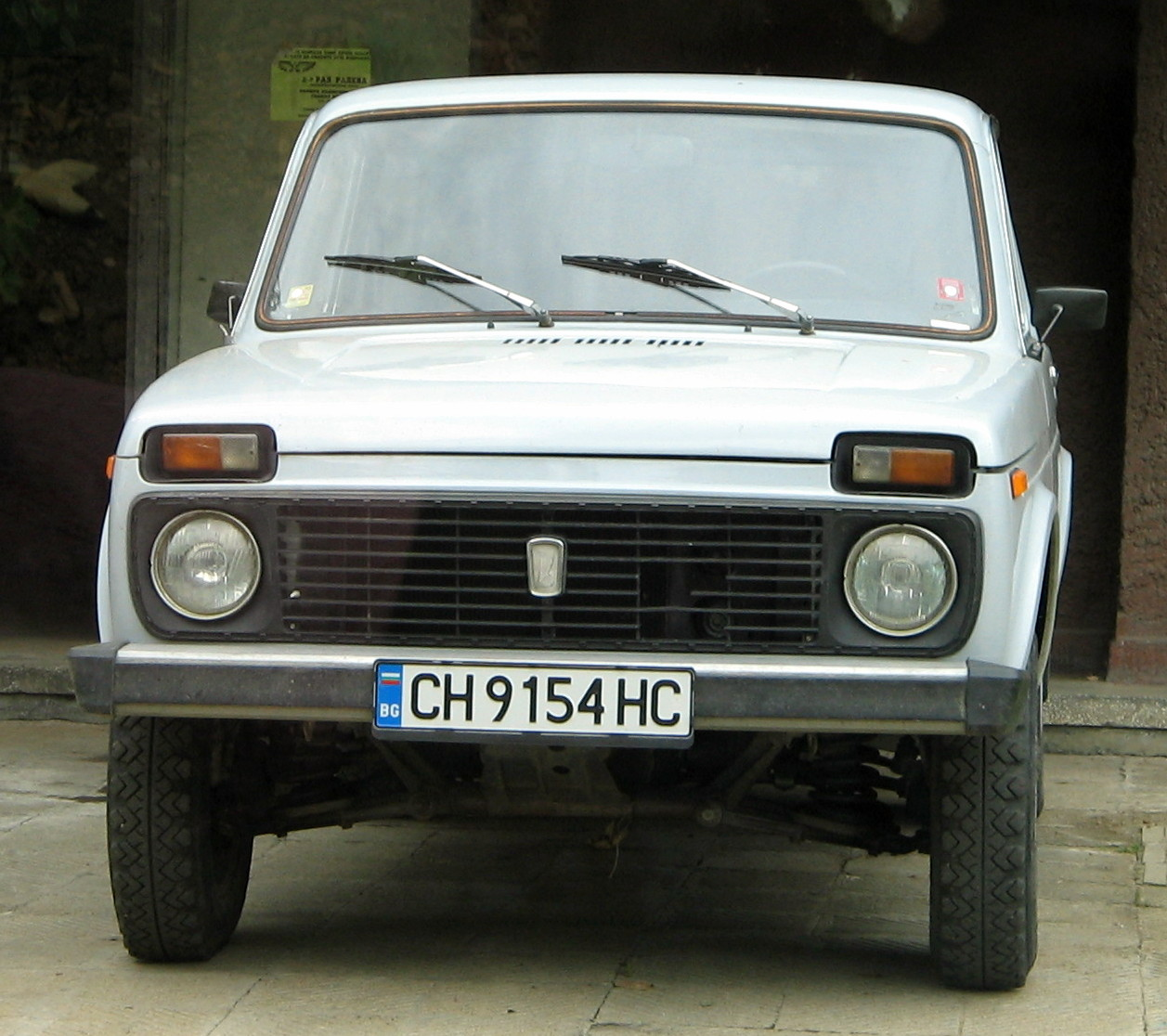
A Lada Niva, the protagonist's vehicle

Suddenly, Tschick arrives at his front door in a stolen and run-down, light blue Lada Niva. Tschick asks Maik to join him on a trip to visit his grandfather in Walachia. Even though neither of the two actually knows where that is, Maik hesitantly accepts and the two start a journey into the unknown. Before that, however, they drop by at Tatjana's birthday party, where Maik, encouraged by Tschick, hands his crush the present. The boys then drive off, leaving the bewildered guests behind.

As they haven't brought any maps, the boys soon get lost in the forest and emerge in a small village. A family of five kids, and a mother, who is overtly critical of consumerism, invites them for lunch, which is strictly organic and only handed out to those who can answer a short quiz, which mostly revolves around Harry Potter. Further down the road, while scavenging a dump for a hose in order to steal some fuel for their Lada, the runaways encounter the tomboyish and street-smart Isa Schmidt. Isa plans on travelling to Prague to visit her half-sister and offers to help the boys find and use a hose, if they take her somewhat along the way in exchange. Despite her unbearable uncleanliness and stench, the boys reluctantly agree.

Arriving at a reservoir, they throw Isa into the water without any hesitation, so she can wash herself and get rid of her stench. She throws away her old clothes, cleans herself thoroughly and then puts on Maik's clothes. Maik is then allowed to cut her hair very short and discovers not only her shapely naked upper body, but also that his old love for Tatjana gradually starts to fade away. The next morning, the three of them decide to climb the nearby mountain. They enjoy the delightful nature and romantic atmosphere at the peak, carve their initials into a piece of wood and vow to meet again at this very spot in exactly 50 years.

As they are descending the mountain and a coach stops at the car park, Isa thinks getting to Prague by coach would work better than with the old Lada. They arrive at the crater of a huge area of brown coal mining and meet the last remaining inhabitant Horst Fricke, who is obviously senile. After welcoming them by shooting them with an airgun, he invites them for a lemonade and tells them about his tragic losses (for instance of his love) and traumatic experiences he had at a concentration camp and at the eastern front. As a farewell present he forces a mysterious, small bottle with a foul-smelling, but seemingly life-saving liquid, on them, but Tschick throws it out the window of the Lada without hesitation.

When they are finally able to continue with their journey along minor side roads, they suddenly discover from the top of a hill that there is a motorway right next to them. Whilst trying to reach the motorway by driving down the slope of the hill, they overturn multiple times and their Lada comes to a stop with the wheels facing up. A speech therapist, who happens to be driving by in her BMW 5 Series, tries to help them and in doing so drops her fire extinguisher on Tschick's foot and seriously injures him. She then takes them to the nearest hospital, where Tschick gets his leg plastered. From the hospital window, the two watch a tow truck turn their Lada, which was lying in a field directly opposite the hospital, back the right way up, leave it there and drive away. Once again determined to flee, the two struggle over to their battered car. As Tschick can no longer drive with his leg in plaster, Maik has to take the wheel. Tschick gives him a short technical instruction. At the same time, he confides to his friend that he is gay. Maik, however, is clearly not inclined that way. Soon after, their journey ends with a dangerous collision when the driver of a cattle carrier doesn't want to let them overtake him and they start to skid, then tip over, and end lying sideways on the road. After a thorough investigation at the police station, there is a court hearing, in which Maik, despite the threatening advice from his father, admits his willing participation in the whole affair. Tschick however then proceeds in taking all the blame. Maik has to serve charitable work, and Tschick is condemned to stay in the home which he was taken to after their journey.

The novel ends with the beginning of a new school year and revives its initial motifs: 1) beautiful Tatjana is suddenly interested in Maik's adventure and makes sure that his story gets around the whole class. 2) the alluring Isa writes Maik a letter and wants to visit him in Berlin soon, to pay back the borrowed money and to make up for the lost kiss. 3) Maik's violent father finally leaves the family. But most importantly: 4) Tschick's four week communication ban will soon elapse and Maik is allowed to then visit him at the home. It does not bother Maik at all that his mother, who is still an alcoholic and is currently at home, sinks all her middle class possessions in the in-house swimming pool; on the contrary, mother and son "dive under"(?) together, crouch on the bottom of the pool, hold their breath, glance upwards and rejoice over the two police officers, who were alerted by the neighbours and in bafflement bend over the bubbling surface of the water.

== Style ==
The plot is told through Maik's perspective and begins at the police station, which pre-empts the end of the journey together. Herrndorf has his protagonists explain the adventurous journey to this point in a long flashback in the style of a road movie, whose antics cover the space of a week.

== Reception ==
By using his wonderfully balanced, simple language, which unobtrusively refers to a real youth jargon without naturalistically copying it, he manages to shift his world into obliqueness and lets it appear as young as its protagonists. A résumé, which Maik, the first-person narrator tells at the end says: "The world is bad, and the human is bad too. Never trust anyone and never go with a stranger and so forth. My parents told me that, my teachers told me that, and television told it too. When you watch the News: The human is bad. When you watch Spiegel TV: The human is bad. It might be true and the human is 99 percent bad. The odd thing was, that Tschick and I exclusively met people from the remaining single percent that wasn't."

— Süddeutsche Zeitung

The most astounding thing is how Wolfgang Herrndorf is able to get onto a level with his heroes, how he speaks their language, even if it’s that of two pubescent teenagers […], without it being invasive or embarrassing. The dialogue works because Maik is the compelling young narrator who the author, despite being more knowledgeable and having more life experience, never interferes with. ‘Authentic’ would be the right word, if it didn’t disguise the fact that Herrndorf is a great stylist and a genius with words.

— Die Zeit

== Legacy ==
Why We Took the Car was published as an audio book by Argon Verlag, which is read by Hanno Koffler and contains 4 CDs (total length of approx. 5 hours). It was also published as an audio drama version by NDR which contains 2 CDs and is directed by Iris Drögenkamp (total length of 84 minutes).

An act version of Why We Took the Car, edited by Robert Koall, was premiered under the direction of Jan Gehle at the Staatsschauspiel Dresden on November 19, 2011, and has been part of the repertoire since then. The cast included Benjam Pauquet, Sebastian Wendelin and Lea Ruckpaul.

It was one of the most performed plays on German stages with 764 performances in the 2012/13 season. The 29 productions drew in 99,000 visitors.

After Wolfgang Herrndorf's death an unfinished sequel to Tschick was released in 2014.

Pictures Of Your True Love: An unfinished novel. Published by Marcus Gärtner and Kathrin Passig. Rowohlt, Berlin 2014, ISBN 978-3-87134-791-7.

Before his death, Herrndorf mandated Lars Hubrich with a screenplay for a film adaption of Tschick. David Wnendt started out as the director of the project but was replaced by Fatih Akin in July 2015. The leading roles are played by Tristan Göbel as Maik, Anand Batbileg as Tschick, and Mercedes Müller as Isa. The shooting of the movie started in fall 2015 and it was out in cinemas on September 15, 2016.

An opera version of the book was premiered at Theater Hagen on March 18, 2017. The music for it was composed by Ludger Vollmer and it was directed by Roman Hovenbitzer. The musical director was the conductor Florian Ludwig.

== Editions ==
- Wolfgang Herrndorf: Tschick. Rowohlt Berlin, Berlin 2010, ISBN 978-3-87134-710-8.
- Paperback: rororo 21651 rororo Rotfuchs, Rowohlt, Reinbek bei Hamburg 2012, ISBN 978-3-499-21651-0; as bibliophile Special Edition: rororo 25991, ISBN 978-3-499-25991-3; With added notes regarding he film: Rowohlt, Reinbek bei Hamburg 2016: ISBN 978-3-499-27257-8.
- as audio book auf 4 CDs (297 minutes): read by Hanno Koffler, Director: Vera Teichmann. Editor: Lena Lindenbauer, Argon, Berlin 2010 / 2012, ISBN 978-3-8398-9126-1.
- as radio play auf 2 CDs (84 minutes): by NDR Studio Hamburg, Editor: Norbert Schaeffer. Director: Iris Drögekamp. Voice-Actor: Julian Greis, Constantin von Jascheroff, Effi Rabsilber and others, Argon, Berlin 2011, ISBN 978-3-8398-9081-3.

== Literature ==
- Wolfgang Pütz: Wolfgang Herrndorf, Tschick (= Klett Lerntraining), PONS, Stuttgart 2016 ISBN 978-3-12-923102-9.
- Thomas Möbius: Tschick von Wolfgang Herrndorf. Textanalyse und Interpretation mit ausführlicher Inhaltsangabe und Abituraufgaben mit Lösungen. Königs Erläuterungen 493, Bange, Hollfeld 2014, ISBN 978-3-8044-2008-3.
- Boris Hoge-Benteler: Metakonstruktion. Zu Möglichkeiten des Umgangs mit ‚problematischen‘ Russland-/Russendarstellungen in der jüngsten deutschen Erzählliteratur am Beispiel von Wolfgang Herrndorfs Roman „Tschick“. In: Kjl & m – Forschung, Schule, Bibliothek, 67 (2015) 2, S. 33–42.
- Eva-Maria Scholz: Lektüreschlüssel. Wolfgang Herrndorf: „Tschick“, Reclam, Stuttgart 2014, ISBN 978-3-15-015442-7.
- Hans-Jürgen van der Gieth: Wolfgang Herrndorf: „Tschick“, Roman, Literaturprojekt BVK, Kempen 2012, ISBN 978-3-86740-369-6.
- Elinor Matt: Wolfgang Herrndorf, „Tschick“, Schülerarbeitsheft und Lehrerheft, Krapp & Gutknecht, Rot an der Rot 2012, ISBN 978-3-941206-46-5 / ISBN 978-3-941206-47-2.
- Manja Vorbeck-Heyn, Marcus Schotte: Wolfgang Herrndorf. Tschick. Lehrerhandbuch. Ernst Klett Sprachen, Stuttgart 2012, ISBN 978-3-12-666930-6; erweiterte Neuausgabe 2015, ISBN 978-3-12-666931-3.
