= Star 111 =

2020 novel by Lutz Seiler

- Author: Lutz Seiler
- Original title: Stern 111
- Translator: Tess Lewis
- Language: German
- Publisher: Suhrkamp Verlag
- Publication date: 2 March 2020
- Publication place: Germany
- English publication date: 6 September 2023
- Pages: 528
- ISBN: 978-3-518-42925-9

Star 111 (German: Stern 111) is a 2020 novel by the German writer Lutz Seiler. It follows the East German bricklayer and student Carl Bischoff during his everyday life in Berlin at the time of the German reunification.

The book received the 2020 Leipzig Book Fair Prize.
