= Lutz Seiler =

German poet and novelist

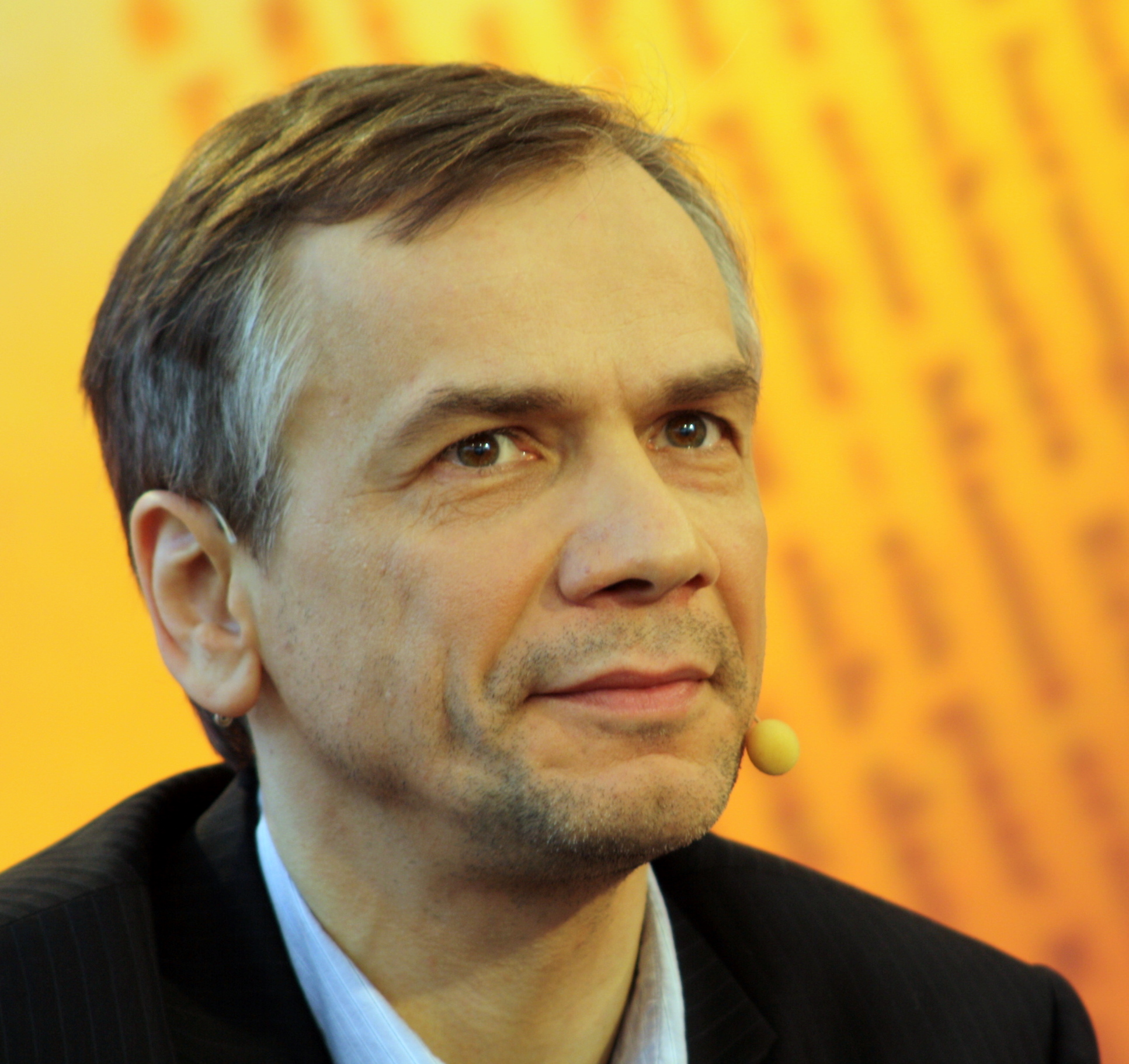
- Lutz Seiler in 2010
- Born: 8 June 1963 (age 63); Gera, Thuringia, Germany
- Occupations: Poet and novelist
- Website: https://lutzseiler.de/

Lutz Seiler (born 8 June 1963 in Gera, Thuringia) is a German poet and novelist. Considered one of the most important German poets living today, he is the author of numerous books of poetry, prose, and essays, and gained national attention for his debut novel Kruso. In 2023 he was awarded the Georg Büchner Prize, the most prestigious award for German literature. He has served as the literary director and custodian of the Peter Huchel Museum since 1997.

== Life and work ==
Lutz Seiler grew up in the Langenberg district of Gera, Thuringia (former East Germany). After training as a skilled building construction worker, he worked as a bricklayer and carpenter. During his national service in the National People's Army (NVA) of the DDR, he started to take an interest in literature and wrote his first poems. The poet Peter Huchel was amongst those he first admired. Later he said "Why I started to read and write, I still have no idea. Literature was of no interest to me."

During the DDR years Seiler's home town of Gera grew rapidly to service the uranium mines at Ronneburg and in his early poetry the symbolism of radioactivity was significant. In the summer of 1989 Seiler worked as a seasonal employee on the island of Hiddensee, a popular former East German holiday resort located west of the island of Rügen off the north-eastern coast of Germany, an experience that later formed the basis of his first novel published in 2014, Kruso.

Seiler read German Studies at the universities of Halle (Saale) and Berlin up to 1990. From 1993 to 1998 he was co-editor of the short-lived literary journal Moosbrand published in Wilhelmshorst, near Potsdam.

Since 1997 he has been the literary director and custodian at the Peter Huchel Museum in Wilhelmshorst, where he lives part time and writes in solitude. He also has a home in Stockholm with his wife. In 2005 he became a member of PEN Centre Germany. In 2007 Seiler became a member of the Academy of the Arts and Sciences, Mainz and in 2010 a member of the Bavarian Academy of Fine Arts and also the Academy of Arts, Berlin.

In 2007, Seiler was awarded the prestigious Ingeborg Bachmann Prize for his short story volume Turksib. Another volume of short stories, Die Zeitwaage was nominated for the Leipzig Book Fair Prize in 2010. In 2011 the German Academy for Language and Poetry elected Seiler a member. In 2015, Seiler held the chair in poetry at Heidelberg, presenting three papers based on themes from his early enjoyment of woodworking.

In 2023, British publisher And Other Stories translated three of Seiler's works into English. That same year, he won the Georg Büchner Prize.

== Kruso ==
Seiler's debut novel Kruso, published in 2014, received the German Book Prize and the Uwe Johnson Prize. It is set on the island of Hiddensee during the last months of the DDR. It was also turned into an audiobook and read by Franz Dinda. It was published in English in February 2017 by Scribe Publications (translated by Tess Lewis).

The island of Hiddensee was a popular East German resort and was close enough to the Danish coast to attract those who wanted to escape across the Baltic Sea to the West. During the summer months it attracted free-thinkers and dropouts from the mainland who would come to work in the tourist hotels and restaurants or as life-guards. Residents and seasonal workers were closely watched by the local Stasi and by the NVA border guards who were on the lookout for people who might attempt to escape to Denmark.

In Kruso, Edgar flees a personal tragedy, leaving his studies at the university of Halle to work on Hiddensee for the summer as a dishwasher at the Zum Klausner restaurant. There he meets Alexander Krusowitsch, known as Kruso (with reference to Robinson Crusoe), who has also escaped from personal loss.

Kruso makes it his mission to teach the 'shipwrecked' people who flee to the island how to find an inner freedom which will enable them to return to their difficult lives on the mainland. However, with the fall of the Berlin Wall and the opening of the borders to the West, Kruso's Utopian community at the Klausner comes to a sudden end.

In September 2015, Kruso was adapted for the German stage by Dagmar Borrmann and performed at the Magdeburg Theatre under the direction of Cornelia Crombholz . In March 2015 it was announced that the novel would also be filmed by the production company UFA Fiction with Nico Hofmann as director. The film was released in 2018 with Albrecht Schuch in the title role and shown on German public television channel ARD.

== Works ==
- Berührt – geführt. Gedichte, Chemnitz 1995.
- Pech & Blende. Gedichte, Suhrkamp Verlag, Frankfurt am Main 2000.
- Heimaten (with Anne Duden and Farhad Showghi), Göttingen 2001.
- Hubertusweg. Drei Gedichte, Warmbronn 2001.
- Vierzig Kilometer Nacht. Gedichte, Suhrkamp Verlag, Frankfurt am Main 2003.
- Sonntags dachte ich an Gott. Aufsätze, Suhrkamp Verlag, Frankfurt am Main 2004.
- Die Anrufung. Essay und vier Gedichte, Warmbronn 2005.
- Turksib. Zwei Erzählungen, Suhrkamp Verlag, Frankfurt am Main 2008.ISBN 3518419684, 978-3518419687
- Die Zeitwaage. Erzählungen, Suhrkamp Verlag, Frankfurt am Main 2009. ISBN 978-3-518-42115-4
- im felderlatein. Gedichte, Suhrkamp Verlag, Berlin 2010. ISBN 978-3-518-42169-7
- Kruso. Novel, Suhrkamp Verlag, Berlin 2014. ISBN 978-3-518-42447-6 Published in English as Kruso, Scribe Publications 2017 ISBN 978-1-911-34400-1
- Die Römische Saison. Zwei Essays. Mit Zeichnungen von Max P. Hering. Topalian & Milani Verlag, Ulm 2016, ISBN 978-3-946423-03-4.
- Am Kap des guten Abends. Acht Bildergeschichten. Insel Verlag, Berlin 2018, ISBN 978-3-458-19455-2.
- Stern 111. Roman. Suhrkamp Verlag, Berlin 2020, ISBN 978-3-518-42925-9.
- Laubsäge und Scheinbrücke. Aus der Vorgeschichte des Schreibens. Heidelberger Poetikvorlesung, edited by Friederike Renes. Heidelberg 2020, ISBN 978-3-8253-6980-4.
- schrift für blinde riesen. Gedichte. Suhrkamp Verlag, Berlin 2021, ISBN 978-3-518-43000-2.

== Works translated into English ==
- Poems. Translated by Andrew Duncan. Duration Press, 2005.
- in field latin. Poems. Translated by Alexander Booth. Translation of im felderlatein. Seagull Books, London/New York/Calcutta 2016, ISBN 978-0-85742-336-8.
- Kruso. Novel. Translated by Tess Lewis. Scribe Publications, Melbourne / London 2017, ISBN 978-1-911344-00-1.
- Pitch & Glint. Poems. Translated by Stefan Tobler. And Other Stories, Sheffield-London-New York 2023. ISBN 978-1-913505-76-9.
- Star 111, Novel. Translated by Tess Lewis. And Other Stories, Sheffield-London-New York 2023. ISBN 978-1-913505-74-5.
- In Case of Loss. Essays. Translated by Martyn Crucefix. And Other Stories, Sheffield-London-New York 2023. ISBN 978-1-913505-78-3.

== Awards ==
- 1999 Kranichsteiner Literaturpreis
- 2000 Lyrikpreis Meran, Dresdner Lyrikpreis, Hermann-Lenz-Stipendium
- 2002 Anna-Seghers-Preis
- 2003 Ernst-Meister-Preis and a Bursary from the Villa Aurora in Los Angeles
- 2004 Bremer Literaturpreis
- 2005 Preis der SWR-Bestenliste
- 2007 Ingeborg-Bachmann-Preis
- 2009 Harald-Gerlach-Literaturstipendium des Landes Thüringen
- 2010 Deutscher Erzählerpreis (for Die Zeitwaage)
- 2010 Fontane Prize of the City of Neuruppin (for Die Zeitwaage)
- 2010 Member of the Academy of Arts, Berlin
- 2010 Member of the Sächsischen Akademie der Künste
- 2011 Member of the Deutschen Akademie für Sprache und Dichtung
- 2012 Christian-Wagner-Preis
- 2012 Rainer-Malkowski-Preis (shared)
- 2014 Uwe Johnson Prize (for Kruso)
- 2015 Marie-Luise-Kaschnitz-Preis
- 2017 Thüringer Literaturpreis
- 2020 Leipzig Book Fair Prize, Fiction (for Stern 111)
- 2020 Kakehashi-Literaturpreis 2020 (for Kruso)
- 2023 Literaturpreis der Konrad-Adenauer-Stiftung
- 2023 Bertolt-Brecht-Literaturpreis
- 2025 International Dublin Literary Award, Longlist
