= Jan Wagner (poet) =

German author and translator (born 1971)

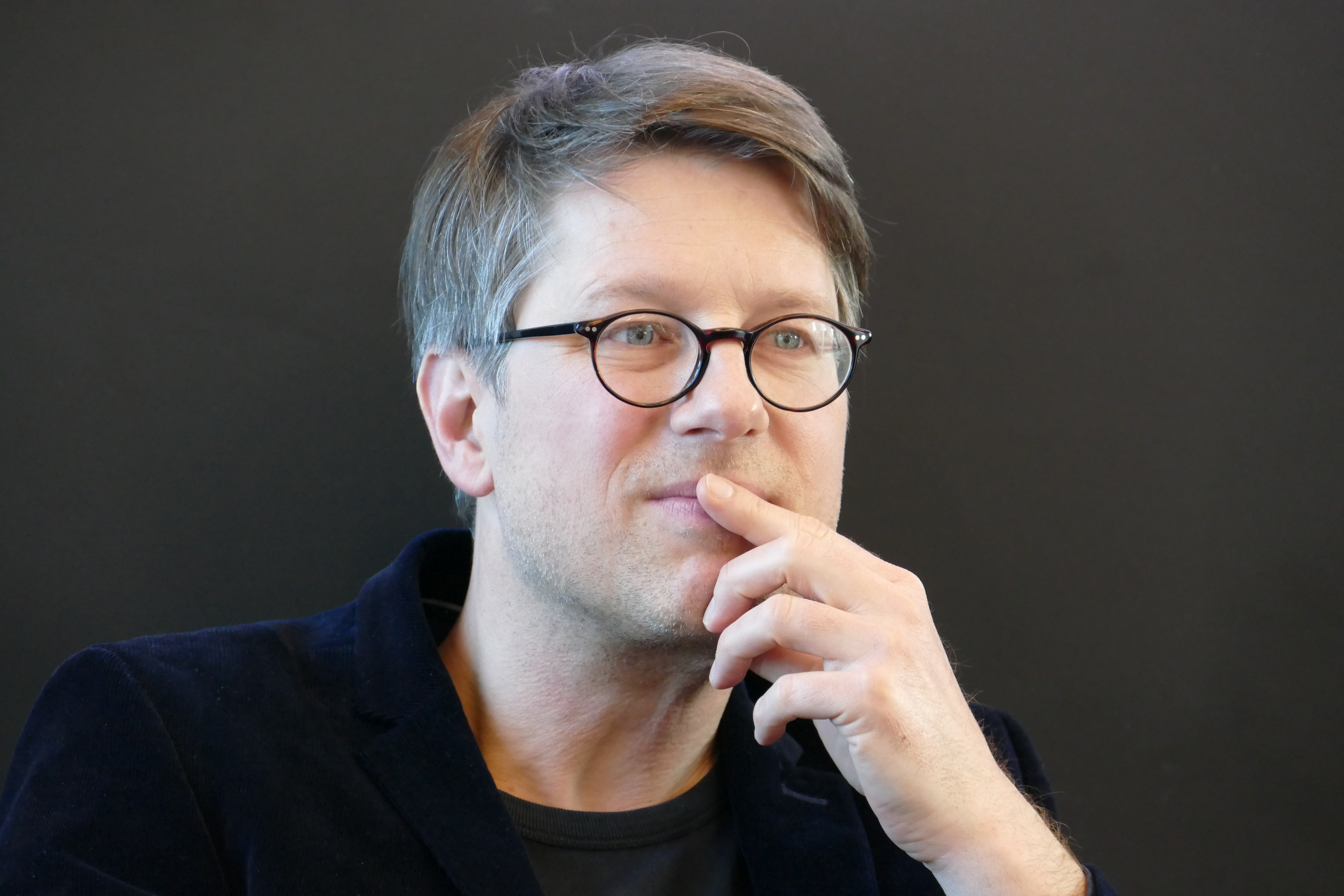
- Writing career
- Notable work: Regentonnenvariationen
- Notable awards: Georg Büchner Prize; Leipzig Book Fair Prize

Jan Wagner (born 18 October 1971) is a German poet, essayist and translator, recipient of the Georg Büchner Prize and Leipzig Book Fair Prize.

== Life ==
Wagner was born in Hamburg, and grew up north of it, in the small town of Ahrensburg in Schleswig-Holstein. He studied English (Anglistics) in Hamburg, Dublin and Berlin, and graduated from Hamburg University, and at Trinity College, Dublin. In 2008, he was Max Kade German Writer in Residence at Oberlin College. In 2001, his first volume of poetry Probebohrung im Himmel was published. Wagner's poems have been translated into thirty languages. Wagner is also a translator of English-language poetry (Charles Simic, James Tate, Simon Armitage, Matthew Sweeney and others), a freelance reviewer (Frankfurter Rundschau and others) and until 2003 co-editor of the international literature box "The Outside of the Element".

Since 1995, he lives in Berlin.

== Awards (selection) ==
- 2001: Förderpreis Hermann-Hesse-Preis
- 2004: Anna Seghers Prize
- 2004: Alfred Gruber Prize at the Merano Poetry Prize
- 2010: Villa Massimo Scholarship, Rome
- 2011: Friedrich Hölderlin Prize of the City of Tübingen
- 2011: Kranichsteiner Literaturpreis
- 2015: Mörike-Preis der Stadt Fellbach
- 2015: Leipzig Book Fair Prize
- 2017: Georg Büchner Prize
- 2017: Zhongkun International Poetry Prize of the University of Peking
- 2020/2021: Poetik-Professur an der Universität Bamberg (33rd poetics professor at the University of Bamberg).
- 2021: PONT Euro-Mediterranean literary prize, Koper/Capodistria, Slovenia

== Memberships ==
- PEN Centre Germany
- Deutsche Akademie für Sprache und Dichtung
- Bayerische Akademie der Schönen Künste
- Akademie der Wissenschaften und der Literatur Mainz

== Works ==
- Probebohrung im Himmel. Gedichte. Berlin Verlag, Berlin 2001, ISBN 978-3-8270-0071-2.
- Guerickes Sperling. Gedichte. Berlin Verlag, Berlin 2004, ISBN 978-3-8270-0091-0.
- Achtzehn Pasteten. Gedichte. Berlin Verlag, Berlin 2007, ISBN 978-3-8270-0721-6.
- Australien. Gedichte. Berlin Verlag, Berlin 2010, ISBN 978-3-8270-0951-7.
- Die Sandale des Propheten. Essays. Berlin Verlag. Berlin 2011, ISBN 978-3-8270-1047-6.
- Die Eulenhasser in den Hallenhäusern. Drei Verborgene. Gedichte. Hanser Berlin, Berlin 2012, ISBN 978-3-446-24030-8.
- Poesiealbum 295. Märkischer Verlag Wilhelmshorst 2011, ISBN 978-3-931329-95-2.
- Der verschlossene Raum. Münchner Reden zur Poesie. Herausgegeben von Maria Gazzetti und Frieder von Ammon, Lyrik Kabinett München, 2012. ISBN 978-3-938776-32-2.
- Regentonnenvariationen. Gedichte. Hanser Berlin, Berlin 2014, ISBN 978-3-446-24646-1.
- Selbstporträt mit Bienenschwarm. Ausgewählte Gedichte 2001–2015. Hanser Berlin, Berlin 2016, ISBN 978-3-446-25075-8.
- Der verschlossene Raum. Beiläufige Prosa. Hanser Berlin, Berlin 2017, ISBN 978-3-446-25475-6.
- Contributor to A New Divan: A Lyrical Dialogue Between East and West (Gingko Library, 2019), ISBN 978-1-909942-28-8.
- Der glückliche Augenblick. Beiläufige Prosa. Essays. Hanser Berlin, Berlin 2021, ISBN 978-3-446-26943-9.
