= Regentonnenvariationen =

Poetry collection by Jan Wagner

- Author: Jan Wagner
- Language: German
- Publisher: Carl Hanser Verlag
- Publication date: 25 August 2014
- Publication place: Germany
- Pages: 112
- ISBN: 978-3-446-24646-1

Regentonnenvariationen (lit. 'Rain Barrel Variations') is a 2014 poetry collection by the German writer Jan Wagner. It received the 2015 Leipzig Book Fair Prize for Fiction.
