= Heike Behrend =

German scholar of social anthropology and African studies (born 1947)

- Born: May 27, 1947 (age 79); Stralsund, Germany
- Education: Free University of Berlin, University of Bayreuth
- Occupations: Writer; social anthropologist; Media studies scholar
- Years active: 1979−present
- Notable work: Alice Lakwena and the Holy Spirits. War in Northern Uganda 1986–97 (1998), Resurrecting Cannibals: The Catholic Church, Witch-Hunts and the Production of Pagans in Western Uganda (2001), Contesting Visibility. Photographic Practices and the „Aesthetics of Withdrawal“ along the East African Coast (2013)

Heike Behrend (born May 27, 1947, in Stralsund) is a German social anthropologist, specialized in African and Media studies. From 1994 until 2012, she was professor of Ethnology at the Institute of African Studies and Egyptology at the University of Cologne. Her scientific career is based on her fieldwork in African countries, particularly Kenya and Uganda. Her research is focused on ritual practices, religion, and memory, exploring the intersections between local African beliefs and global influences. Further, she has contributed several studies and curated exhibitions on photography in Africa.

== Life and career ==
=== Academic career ===
Behrend studied ethnology, sociology and religious studies at LMU Munich, the University of Vienna, and the Free University of Berlin. After completing her studies in ethnology with a Master's degree at the Free University of Berlin in 1973, she trained in documentary filmmaking at the Deutsche Film- und Fernsehakademie Berlin from 1980 to 1984. In 1987, she received her PhD from the Free University of Berlin with the thesis Die Zeit geht krumme Wege. Raum, Zeit und Ritual bei den Tugen in Kenia (Space, Time and Ritual of the Tugen in Kenya). In 1992, she obtained her habilitation from the University of Bayreuth with the thesis War in the North Ugandas. The Holy Spirit Movement of Alice Lakwena.

In Germany, Behrend taught at the Institutes of Ethnology at the Free University of Berlin, the University of Bayreuth, and the University of Mainz. After a visiting professorship at the Ecole des hautes études en sciences sociales in Paris in May 1994, she became a tenured professor at the Institute for African Studies at the University of Cologne. During various visiting professorships and senior fellowships, she taught again at the Ecole des Hautes Etudes in Paris in 1997, and in 2003 at the Programme of African Studies (PAS) of Northwestern University, Evanston, USA. In 2007, she pursued research at the International Research Center for Cultural Studies in Vienna and in 2010 at the Tokyo University of Foreign Studies in Japan.

Behrend's research primarily has focused on popular culture in Africa, the relationship between religion, war, and violence. She conducted fieldwork in East Africa, particularly in Kenya and Uganda. Shorter travels for research led her to Nigeria, Ghana, among other African countries. One of Behrend's earliest research projects was conducted in Kenya, where she studied the Tugen community. In Spirit Possession, Modernity and Power in Africa, she examined how spirit possession and rituals were employed as forms of resistance and coping mechanisms in the face of socio-political change. In Alice Lakwena and the Holy Spirits. War in Northern Uganda 1986–97, she analyzed the biography of Acholi medium-spirit Alice Lakwena and the history of her Holy Spirit Movement in Uganda from social anthropological perspectives. In his introduction to the English translation, Yale University professor of anthropology John F. M. Middleton welcomed Behrend's detailed description of the internal organization of the movement.

Her 2020 autobiography Menschwerdung eines Affen. Eine Autobiografie der ethnografischen Forschung (Incarnation of an Ape. An Autobiography of Ethnographic Research) was critically acclaimed. It was awarded the 2021 Leipzig Book Fair Prize and has been published in Italian and Spanish.

=== Contributions to studies on photography in Africa ===
Being part of the research college "Media and Cultural Communication” of the Universities of Cologne, Bonn and Aachen, Behrend was one of the founders of the newly formed academic field of the anthropology of media in Germany. As part of her research on photography in Africa, she co-curated the exhibition Snap me one! Studio photographers in Africa. This exhibition was shown in 1999 in Germany, the National Museum of African Art in Washington, D.C., and at the Wereldmuseum in Amsterdam. In 2010, she curated the exhibition Photography as a Dream Machine. Popular African Photographers at the Tokyo University of Foreign Studies. Additionally, she donated studio portraits from the East African Indian diaspora to the Smithsonian Museum collections.

Behrend was particularly interested in how African communities use visual media to represent themselves and engage with their past, as well as with their religious beliefs and practices. Her research contributed to the understanding of photography as a cultural practice that goes beyond mere documentation, influencing how history and memory are constructed and communicated.

Since her retirement in 2012, Behrend has been living and working in Berlin.

== Awards and recognitions ==
- 1987 Ernst-Reuter-Prize for her PhD thesis
- 2012 Nomination for the Amory Talbot Prize for Resurrecting Cannibals: The Catholic Church, Witch-Hunts and the Production of Pagans in Western Uganda
- 2021 Leipzig Book Fair Prize for her autobiography Menschwerdung eines Affen

== Selected publications ==
=== Selected books ===
- 1999 Spirit Possession, Modernity & Power in Africa. Univ of Wisconsin Press. 1999. ISBN 978-0-299-16634-2.
- 2000 Alice Lakwena and the Holy Spirits: War in Northern Uganda, 1985–97. Ohio University Press. 31 March 2000. ISBN 978-0-8214-4570-9.
- 2011 Resurrecting Cannibals: The Catholic Church, Witch-Hunts and the Production of Pagans in Western Uganda, Oxford: James Currey.
- 2013 Contesting Visibility: Photographic Practices on the East African Coast. Bielefeld: transcript Verlag. 31 March 2014. ISBN 978-3-8394-2456-8.
- 2020 Menschwerdung eines Affen. Eine Autobiografie der ethnografischen Forschung, Berlin 2020, ISBN 978-3-95757-955-3

=== Selected articles ===
- 2000. "Feeling Global": The Likoni Ferry Photographers in Mombasa, Kenya, African Arts, 33, 3, 70-77.
- 2001. Behrend, Heike (2001). "Fragmented visions: Photo collages by two Ugandan photographers". Visual Anthropology. 14 (3): 301–320. doi:10.1080/08949468.2001.9966837. ISSN 0894-9468.
- 2002. Werbner, Pnina, ed. (2002). "I am like a Movie Star in my Street. Photographic Self-Creation in Postcolonial Kenya". Postcolonial Subjectivities in Africa. Zed Books. pp. 44–62. ISBN 978-1-85649-955-2.
- 2003. Photo-Magic. Photographies in Practices of Healing and Harming in Kenya and Uganda. Birgit Meyer (ed.), Journal of Religion in Africa, special issue on Media and Religion in Africa, 33, 2.
- 2007. The Rise of Occult Powers, AIDS and the Roman Catholic Church in Western Uganda, Journal of Religion in Africa, 37, pp. 41-57.
- 2010. Electricity, Spirit mediums and the Media of Spirits. Ludwig Jäger, Erika Linz, Irmela Schneider (eds.), Media, Culture and Mediality. New Insights into the Current State of Research, Bielefeld, pp. 187-200.
- 2011. "The Titanic in Kano”: Video, Gender and Islam in Northern Nigeria. Margot Badran (ed). Gender and Islam in Africa, Stanford: Stanford University Press, pp. 173-189.
- 2012. 'The Terror of the Feast': Photography, Textiles & Memory in Weddings along the East African Coast. Richard Vokes (ed.) Photography in Africa. Ethnographic Perspectives. James Currey
- 2015. "Celebrating Life": The Construction of Photographic Biographies in Funeral Rites among Kenyan Christians. Christopher Morton and Darren Newbury (eds.),The African Photographic Archive. Research and Curatorial Strategies, Leiden: Brill, pp. 77-93.
- 2018. "Photography as Unveiling”: Muslim Discourses and Practices along the East African Coast. Felicitas Becker, Joel Cabrita and Marie Rodet (eds), Religion, Media and Marginality in Modern Africa, Athens, Ohio UP, pp. 112-132.
- 2019. Photographic Practices and the "Aesthetics of Withdrawal” among Muslims of the East African Coast. Birgit Meyer and Terje Stordalen (eds.), Figurations and Sensations in Judaism, Christianity and Islam, London, pp. 185-197.

=== As editor ===
- 2001. with Jean-Francois Werner (eds.). Photography and Modernity in Africa, Visual Anthropology, 14, 3.
- 2003. L.T. Rubongoya. Naaho Nubo. The Ways of our Ancestors, Africans Write Back Series, series editor Heike Behrend, vol. 1, Cologne: Rüdiger Köppe Verlag.
- 2004. M.W. Magezi, T.E. Nyakango, M.K. Aganatia. The People of the Rwenzoris. The Bayira (Bakonzo/Banande) and Their Culture, Africans Write Back Series, vol. 2, Cologne: Rüdiger Köppe Verlag.
- 2015. with Anja Dreschke und Martin Zillinger (eds.), Trance Mediums and Technical Media. Spirit Possession in the Age of Technical Reproduction, New York: Fordham, ISBN 9780823253821.
- 2015. with Tobias Wendl (eds.). 9/11 and its Remediations in Africa, Berlin.

=== Filmography ===
- 1982 "Im Bauch des Elefanten". An ethnographic film about age and death in the years in Kenya.
- 1985 "Gespräche mit Kopcherutoi". In this ethnographic film, an old woman named Kopcherutoi tells of her life in the Tugen mountains in Kenya.
- 1989 "Mary Akatsa, Prophetin". An ethnographic film about Mary Akatsa, a healer and prophetess in Kibera, a slum in Nairobi, the capital of Kenya.
- 2011 "Satan Crucified. A Catholic Witch-Hunt in Western Uganda"

== Literature ==
- Die Magie der Fotografie. Ein Gespräch mit der Ethnologin Heike Behrend. Fotogeschichte, vol. 162 (2021), pp. 73–78. (in German)
