= Helmut Lethen =

German teacher and writer (1939–2026)

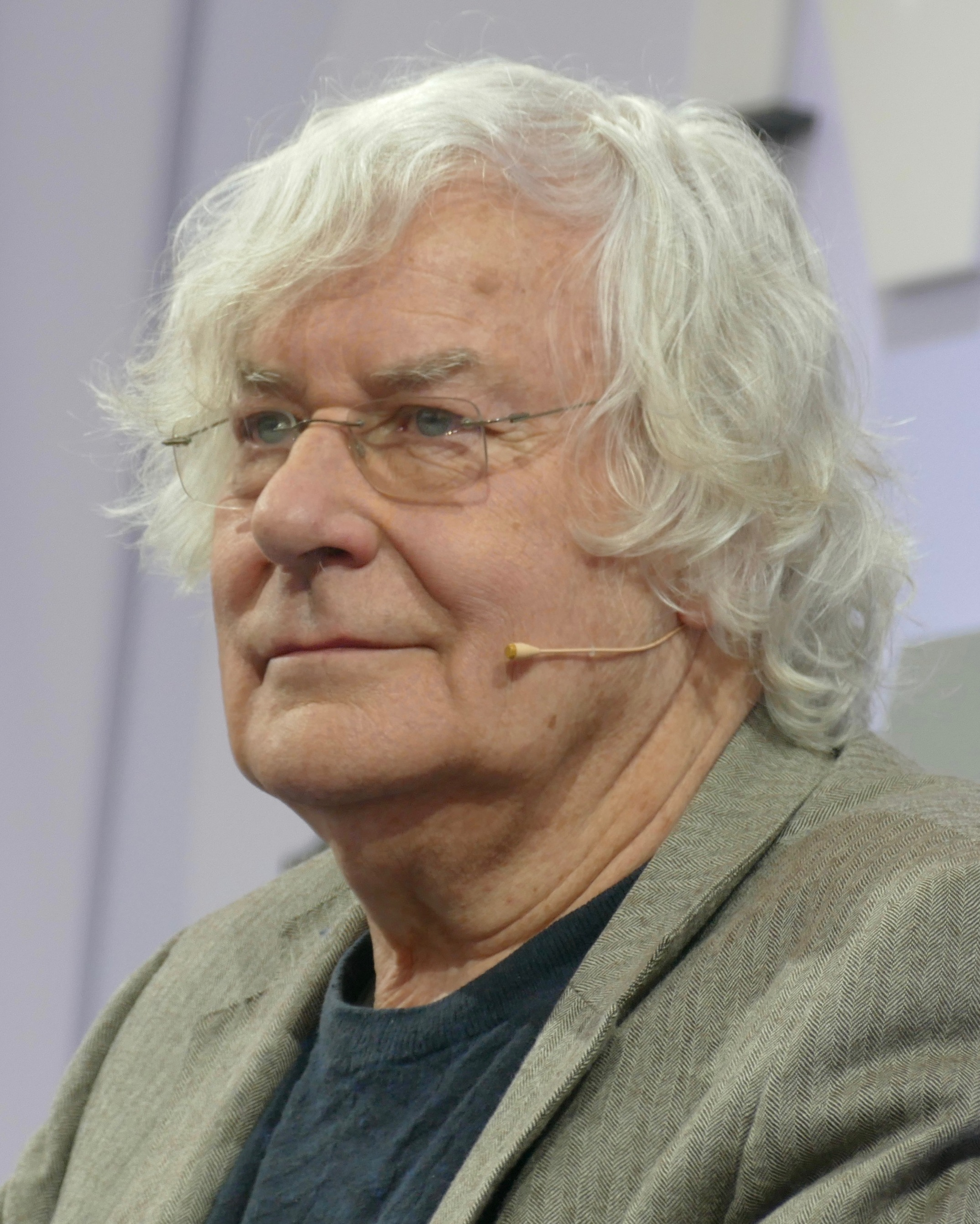
- Lethen in 2018
- Born: 14 January 1939; Mönchengladbach, Gau Düsseldorf, Nazi Germany
- Died: 13 August 2026 (aged 87); Vienna, Austria
- Education: University of Bonn; University of Amsterdam; Free University of Berlin
- Occupations: Germanist; Cultural scholar
- Organizations: Utrecht University; University of Rostock
- Spouses: Loes Scholtheis (m. 1964; div. 1984) Caroline Sommerfeld (m. 1998)
- Children: 5
- Awards: Leipzig Book Fair Prize

Helmut Lethen (14 January 1939 – 13 August 2026) was a German literary and cultural scholar who taught at Utrecht University from 1977 to 1985 and at the University of Rostock from 1996 to 2004. He was director of the International Research Centre for Cultural Studies in Vienna from 2007 to 2016. Lethen was known internationally for books such as Verhaltenslehren der Kälte (Cool Conduct) about the Weimar Republic (1994) and Der Sound der Väter, a study of Gottfried Benn (2006).

== Life and career ==
Lethen was born in Mönchengladbach on 14 January 1939 to the merchant Wilhelm Lethen and his wife Ilse née Plücken, a secretary. Both parents supported the Nazis. His father was a soldier in World War II. Due to his father's absence, his mother moved with him to Jünkerath and Oberwesel. After the War, he saw a 1956 French documentary film, Nacht und Nebel, covering concentration camps, which left a lasting impression on him.

After completing school and obtaining the Abitur in 1959, Lethen joined the Bundeswehr as a volunteer as one of two from his class, and was promoted to lieutenant in the reserves. He studied the science of literature, sociology and philosophy of religion at the University of Bonn, and in Amsterdam and West Berlin until 1969. He was a left-wing student activist, becoming one of those who disrupted the opening of the Deutscher Germanistentag in West Berlin in 1968. He was a member of the Maoist party KPD-AO until 1975, when he was dismissed.

Lethen earned his doctorate in 1970 with a dissertation entitled Neue Sachlichkeit 1924–1932. Studies in the Literature of White Socialism. From 1971 to 1976, he was an assistant at the Free University of Berlin.

Lethen was professor at Utrecht University from 1977 to 1995. As a former radical student, he was not able to obtain a teaching position in Germany at the time. He also held visiting professorships.

In 1995, he was appointed professor at the University of Rostock, where he held the chair of modern German literature from 1996 to 2004. From 2007 to 2016, he was director of the International Research Centre for Cultural Studies in Vienna. The institute became part of the University of Art and Design Linz where he held a professorship from 2016 onward.

Lethen became known to a wider audience through his publication of the books Cool Conduct: The Culture of Distance in Weimar Germany (1994) and Der Sound der Väter about Gottfried Benn (2006). In 2014, he received the Leipzig Book Fair Prize in the non-fiction/essay category for Der Schatten des Fotografen.

In October 2020, he published Denn für dieses Leben ist der Mensch nicht schlau genug, his autobiography.

=== Personal life ===
Lethen married Loes Scholtheis in 1964. The couple separated in 1984. He then married the writer Caroline Sommerfeld in 1998, who since the mid-2010s has become connected with the Neue Rechte and the Identitarian movement. The couple's relationship has attracted a number of articles, including The New York Times coverage "When Old Left and Far-Right Share a Bedroom" in 2018. The couple had three sons.

Lethen died in Vienna on 13 August 2026, at the age of 87.

== Publications ==
- Neue Sachlichkeit. 1924–1932. Studien zur Literatur des „Weißen Sozialismus". Metzler, Stuttgart 1970 (= dissertation at the FU Berlin, 1970).
- Verhaltenslehren der Kälte. Lebensversuche zwischen den Kriegen (= Edition Suhrkamp 1884 = NF 884). Suhrkamp, Frankfurt (Main) 1994, ISBN 978-3-518-11884-9 (English translation by Don Reneau: Cool Conduct. The Culture of Distance in Weimar Germany. University of California Press, Berkeley CA a. o. 2002, ISBN 0-520-20109-4).
- with Rainer Grübel and Ralf Grütemeier: Orientierung Literaturwissenschaft. Reinbek 2001.
- Der Sound der Väter. Gottfried Benn und seine Zeit. Rowohlt, Berlin 2006, ISBN 978-3-87134-544-9.
- with Wolfgang Eßbach and Joachim Fischer (eds.): Plessners "Grenzen der Gemeinschaft". Eine Debatte. Frankfurt am Main 2002.
- Der Sound der Väter. Gottfried Benn und seine Zeit. Rowohlt, Berlin 2006, ISBN 978-3-87134-544-9.
- Unheimliche Nachbarschaften. Essays zum Kälte-Kult und der Schlaflosigkeit der philosophischen Anthropologie im 20. Jahrhundert (= Rombach Wissenschaften. Edition Parabasen. Band 10). Rombach, Freiburg (Breisgau) a. o. 2009, ISBN 978-3-7930-9599-6.
- Suche nach dem Handorakel. Ein Bericht. Wallstein, Göttingen 2012, ISBN 978-3-8353-1159-6.
- Der Schatten des Fotografen. Bilder und ihre Wirklichkeit. Rowohlt, Berlin 2014, ISBN 978-3-87134-586-9.
- Die Staatsräte. Elite im Dritten Reich: Gründgens, Furtwängler, Sauerbruch, Schmitt. Rowohlt, Berlin 2018, ISBN 978-3-87134-797-9.
- Denn für dieses Leben ist der Mensch nicht schlau genug. Rowohlt, Berlin 2020, ISBN 978-3-7371-0088-5 (Autobiography).
- Der Sommer des Großinquisitors. Über die Faszination des Bösen. Rowohlt, Berlin 2022, ISBN 978-3-7371-0162-2.
- Stoische Gangarten. Rowohlt August 2025, ISBN 978-3-7371-0237-7.
