= Philipp Ther =

German historian

Professor Philipp Ther
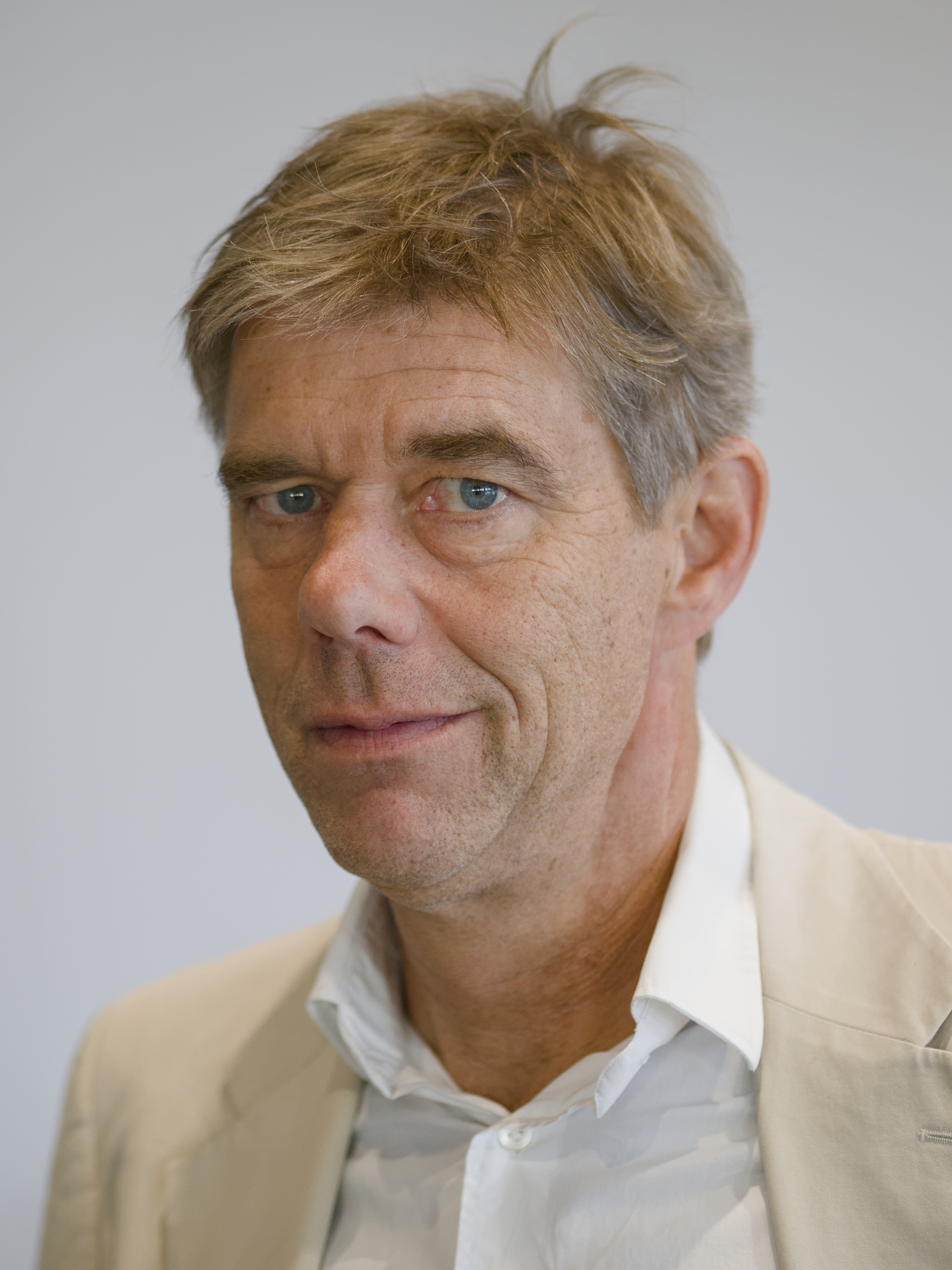
- Ther in 2025
- Born: May 16, 1967 (age 59)
- Education: Free University of Berlin (PhD, 1997)
- Employer: University of Vienna
- Notable work: Europe since 1989: A History
- Awards: Leipzig Book Fair Prize (2015); Wittgenstein Award (2019)

Philipp Ther (born 16 May 1967) is an Austrian and German historian. He is a tenured university professor at the University of Vienna who received the Wittgenstein Award in 2019. Ther is the founding director of the Research Center for the History of Transformations (RECET).

== Early years and education ==
Ther grew up in Bavaria. His father, Otto Ther, directed several educational institutions, including the Outward Bound schools in Baad and Berchtesgaden. For a time he also taught at the Istanbul High School, where Philipp Ther spent part of his childhood.

Ther studied Modern History, Eastern European History, Sociology and Political Science at the University of Regensburg and LMU Munich from 1988 to 1992. He lived in Ukraine and Poland for several years.

Ther graduated in 1993 from Georgetown University with a Master’s Degree. In 1997, he received his doctorate from the Free University of Berlin with a dissertation on German and Polish Displaced Persons from 1945 to 1956.

== Career ==
From 1997 until 1998, he was a John F. Kennedy Fellow at the Center for European Studies at Harvard University. Subsequently, he was a research associate at the Center for Comparative European History at Freie Universität Berlin until 2002.

In 2002, he worked as junior professor for Polish and Ukrainian studies at the European University Viadrina in Frankfurt (Oder), where he published his habilitation on the political and social function of the opera house in the 19th century. From 2007 to 2010, Philipp Ther held the professorship for Comparative European history at the European University Institute in Florence.

Ther gained recognition as an expert on the history of expulsion and displacement in Europe and publicly criticized the German Federation of Expellees, whose policies he described as not being aimed at reconciliation even after the end of the Cold War. The federation's then president Erika Steinbach subsequently intervened by lodging a complaint with Ther's publishing house Vandenhoeck & Ruprecht. The publisher released this letter to the public and described it as "brazen meddling"

Since 2010, Ther has been a tenured university professor for the history of East Central Europe at the Institute of Eastern European History at the University of Vienna, where he served as the institute's executive director from 2014 to 2018. After receiving the Wittgenstein Award in 2019, he founded the Research Center for the History of Transformations (RECET), an interdisciplinary research institution focusing on transformation processes in Eastern and Central Europe.

In July 2022, it became public that a selection committee at the European University Viadrina proposed the historian as the only candidate to be elected university president. Philipp Ther rejected the offer in August 2022.

Ther's research interests include comparative social and cultural history of the 19th and 20th centuries in Germany and East Central Europe, especially nationalism studies, history of migration, urban history, and the history of music theater. His research focuses on comparative analyses of the history of transformation in Eastern and Central Europe since the 1980s.

== Family ==
He lives in Vienna with his wife and children.

== Awards ==
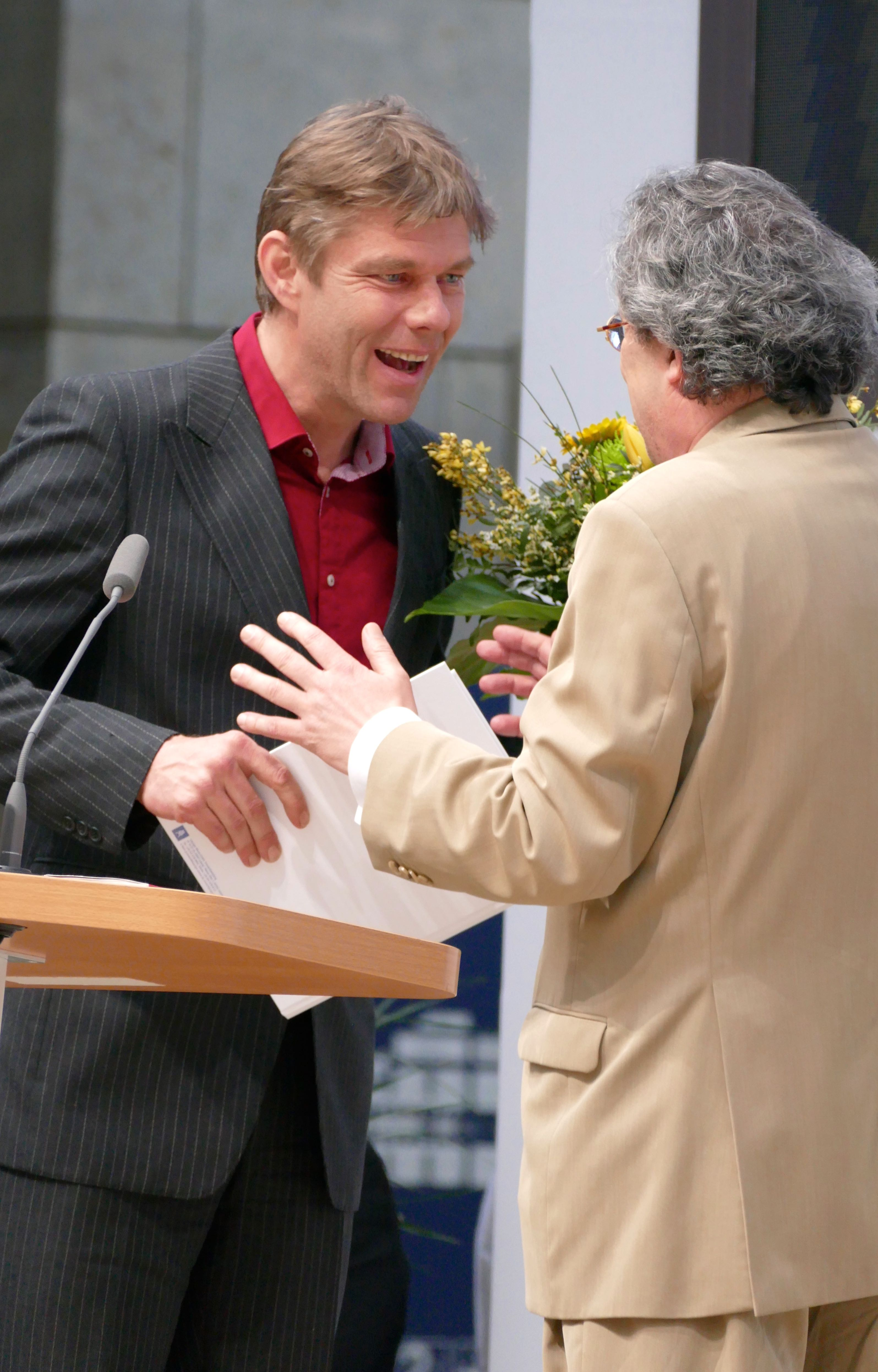
Philipp Ther receiving the Leipzig Book Fair Prize for non-fiction in 2015

- 2006: Richard G. Plaschka Award of the Austrian Academy of Sciences for the book Operntheater in Zentraleuropa [Music theater in Central Europe]
- 2015: Nonfiction Book Prize of the Leipzig Book Fair for his book Europe since 1989: A History
- 2019: Wittgenstein Award for the research project Die Große Transformation. Eine vergleichende Sozialgeschichte globaler Umbrüche.

== Publications ==
Books translated into English (selection)

- The Dark Side of Nation-States: Ethnic Cleansing in Modern Europe, Berghahn Books, New York/Oxford, 2014, ISBN 978-1-78238-302-4
- Center Stage: Operatic Culture and Nation Building in Nineteenth-Century Central Europe, Purdue University Press, West Lafayette, 2014, ISBN 978-1557536754
- Europe since 1989: A history. Princeton University Press, Princeton, 2018, ISBN 9780691181134
- The Outsiders: Refugees in Europe since 1492, Princeton University Press, Princeton, 2021, ISBN 9780691207131
