= Herfried Münkler =

German political scientist

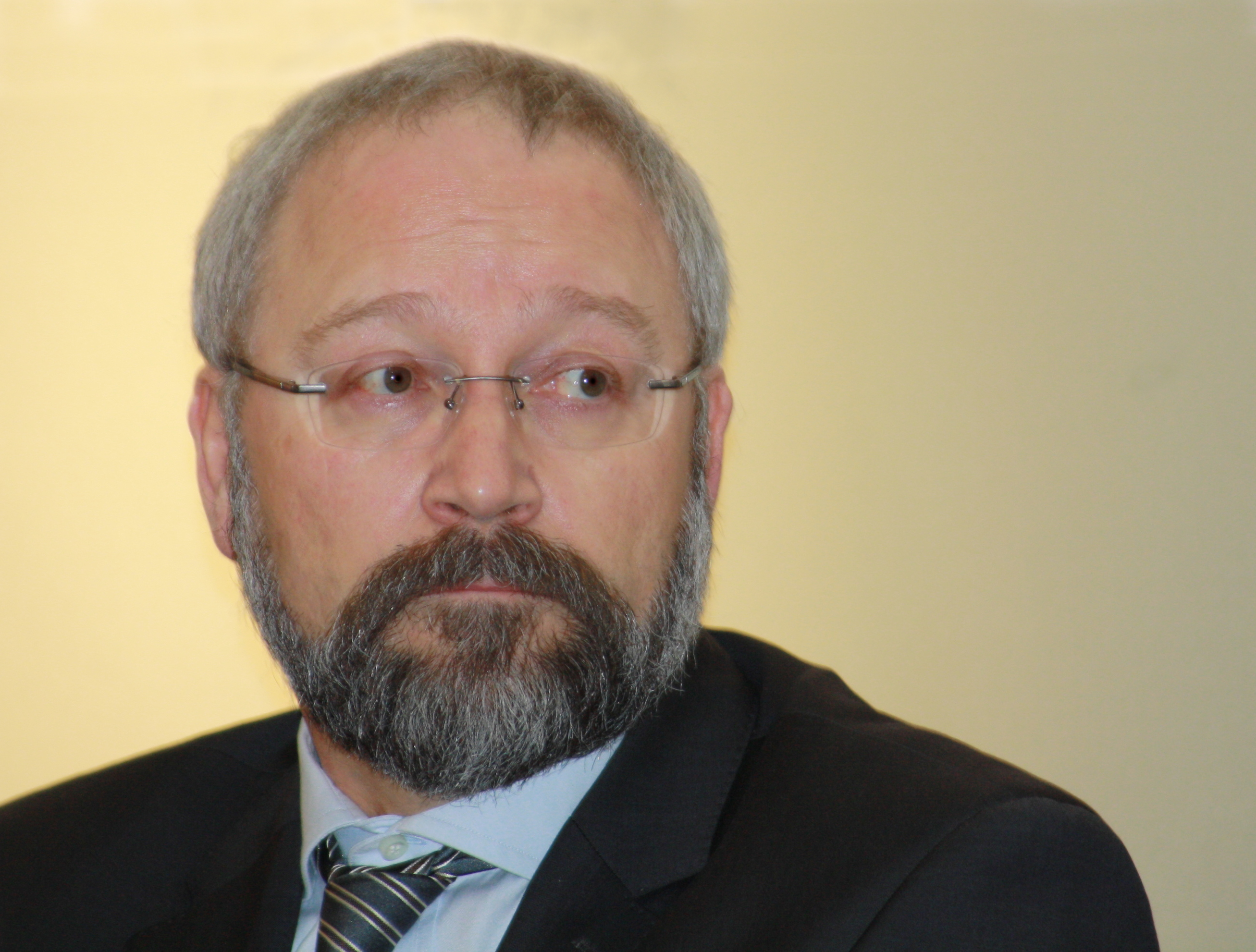
- Münkler at the Leipzig Book Fair 2009
- Born: August 15, 1951 (age 75); Friedberg, Hesse, West Germany
- Occupation: Political scientist
- Writing career
- Notable awards: Leipzig Book Fair Prize; 2009

Herfried Münkler (born August 15, 1951) is a German political scientist. He is a Professor of Political Theory at Humboldt University in Berlin. Münkler is a regular commentator on global affairs in the German-language media and author of numerous books on the history of political ideas (German: Ideengeschichte), on state-building and on the theory of war, such as "Machiavelli" (1982), "Gewalt und Ordnung" (1992), "The New Wars" (orig. 2002) and "Empires: The Logic of World Domination from Ancient Rome to the United States" (orig. 2005). In 2009 Münkler was awarded the Leipzig Book Fair Prize in the category "Non-fiction" for Die Deutschen und ihre Mythen (engl. "the Germans and their myths").

== Early life and education ==
Münkler grew up in rural south Hesse in the early years of post-war West Germany. In 1970, he graduated (Abitur) from the Augustinerschule in Friedberg.

Münkler studied German, political science and philosophy at the Goethe University Frankfurt in Frankfurt am Main, graduating with the first Staatsexamen in 1977 and earning a PhD with a dissertation titled „Geschichtsphilosophie und politisches Handeln. Niccolò Machiavellis Antworten auf den Zusammenbruch der christlichen Geschichtsphilosophie und die Krise der Republik Florenz“ (translation: "Philosophy of history and political action. Machiavelli's answers to the collapse of Christian philosophy of history and the crisis of the Republic of Florence) in 1981.

== Career ==
From 1982 Münkler was a research assistant at the department of social sciences at Goethe University. He habilitated at Frankfurt 1987 with a thesis on the topic „Staatsraison. Ein Leitbegriff der Frühen Neuzeit“ (translation: National interest. A Leitmotif in the Early Modern Age) and became professor for political science there.

In March 1992, Münkler was offered a professorship at Humboldt University Berlin, which he took up. Since then, he has been a professor for Political Theory there.

== Other activities ==
- Berlin-Brandenburg Academy of Sciences and Humanities, Member
- Federal Academy for Security Policy (BAKS), Member of the Advisory Board (since 2015)
- Jugend debattiert, Member of the Board of Trustees

== Political views ==
During his time as a student, Münkler was a member of the Jusos (youth organisation of the Social Democratic Party of Germany). In July 2011, he published an essay in the German weekly news magazine Der Spiegel calling for more centralisation of power in the European Union.

Münkler has argued that Muslim societies are the most belligerent due to the permission of polygamy.

== Personal life ==
Münkler and his wife, Marina, were married in 1983. She is a professor of German literature and German studies at Dresden University. They have two children. Their daughter Laura Münkler is a law professor at Greifswald University.

== Selected works ==
in English:

- Empires: The Logic of World Domination from Ancient Rome to the United States, Polity, Malden, Massachusetts, 2001
- New Wars, Polity, Malden, Massachusetts, 2005

in German:

- Konzeptionen der Gerechtigkeit: Kulturvergleich – Ideengeschichte – moderne Debatte, Nomos, Baden-Baden 1999 (ed.).
- Lexikon der Renaissance, Beck, München 2000 (with Marina Münkler).
- Thomas Hobbes, Campus-Verlag, Frankfurt/Main, New York 2001.
- Der demokratische Nationalstaat in den Zeiten der Globalisierung: politische Leitideen für das 21. Jahrhundert, Akademie-Verlag, Berlin 2002 (ed.).
- Über den Krieg: Stationen der Kriegsgeschichte im Spiegel ihrer theoretischen Reflexion, Velbrück, Weilerswist 2003.
- Politikwissenschaft: ein Grundkurs, Rowohlt Taschenbuch-Verlag, Reinbek bei Hamburg 2003 (ed.).
- Clausewitz' Theorie des Krieges, Nomos, Baden-Baden 2003.
- Der neue Golfkrieg, Rowohlt, Reinbek bei Hamburg 2003.
- Machiavelli: die Begründung des politischen Denkens der Neuzeit aus der Krise der Republik Florenz, Fischer Taschenbuch-Verlag, Frankfurt am Main 2004 (zugleich: Dissertation, Frankfurt (Main) 1981).
- Die neuen Kriege, 2002 (=The New Wars, Polity Press 2004).
- Imperien. Die Logik der Weltherrschaft. Vom alten Rom bis zu den Vereinigten Staaten, 2005 (= Empires: The Logic of World Domination from Ancient Rome to the US, 2007).
- Die Deutschen und ihre Mythen, 2008
- Mitte und Maß. Der Kampf um die richtige Ordnung., 2010
- Der Große Krieg: Die Welt 1914 bis 1918, 2013
- Macht in der Mitte: Die neuen Aufgaben Deutschlands in Europa, 2015
- Der Dreißigjährige Krieg: Europäische Katastrophe, deutsches Trauma 1618-1648, 2017
- Marx, Wagner, Nietzsche: Welt im Umbruch, 2021

== Film and TV appearances ==
- Marx Reloaded, Arte, April 2011.
