= Ulrich Raulff =

German journalist, author and translator (born 1950)

Ulrich Raulff BVO
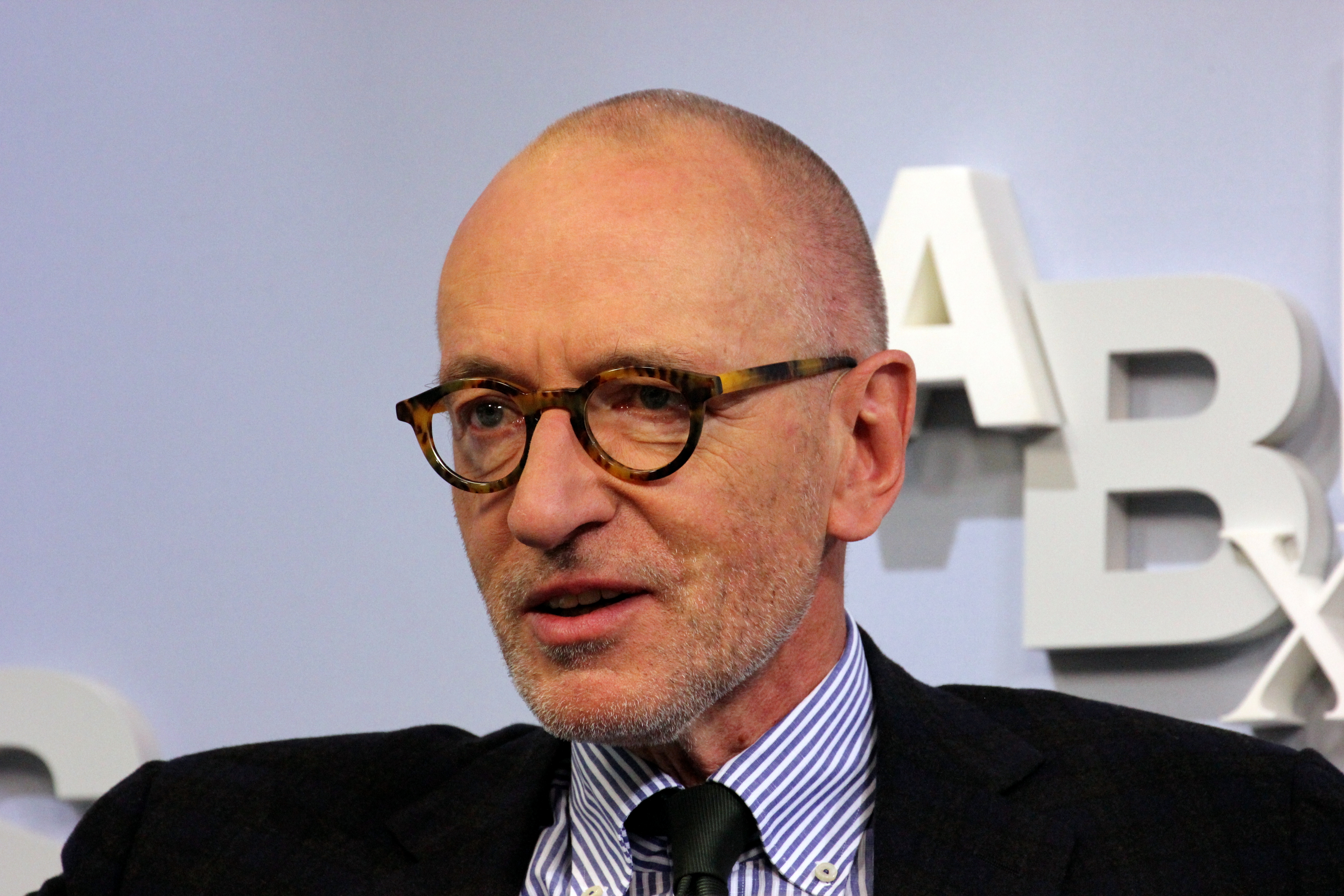
- Portrait of Raulff at the Frankfurt Book Fair, 2015
- Born: Ulrich Raulf; 1950 (age 75–76); Hülseberg, North Rhine-Westphalia, West Germany
- Occupation: Journalist
- Title: President of ifa (2018-2025)
- Awards: Leipzig Book Fair Prize (2010); Ernst Robert Curtius Prize (2013)

Academic background
- Education: Marburg University
- Thesis: Das normale Leben: Michel Foucaults Theorie der Normalisierungsmacht. (1977)
- Doctoral advisor: Dietmar Kamper

Academic work
- Discipline: History
- Sub-discipline: Intellectual and cultural history
- Institutions: DLA
- Main interests: Normalization
- Conscription
- Allegiance: West Germany
- Branch: Bundeswehr
- Service years: 1969–1971
- Rank: Leutnant

Ulrich Raulff (born 1950 as Ulrich Raulf in Hülseberg, Arnsberg) is a German cultural scientist and writer.

== Early life ==
Raulff studied English, philosophy and history at Marburg University, gaining his doctorate under the philosopher Dietmar Kamper in October 1977.

== Career ==
After changing his name back to Raulff in 1977, he habilitated at the Humboldt University of Berlin in 1995 in cultural studies. Since 1994 he was feuilleton editor for the Frankfurter Allgemeine Zeitung, since 1997 head of department and from 2001 a senior editor with the features section of the Süddeutsche Zeitung. In 1979, he was one of the founders of the magazine Tumult. He researches and publishes on Marc Bloch, Aby Warburg and the George Circle. In 2018 he departed his role at the German Museum of Modern Literature, after leading the Deutsches Literaturarchiv Marbach for nearly 15 years.

Raulff is a member of the foundation board of the Stefan George Foundation. He is a member of the PEN Centre Germany and since 2007 the German Academy for Language and Literature in Darmstadt.

== Prizes ==
- For his book Kreis ohne Meister, in which he studied the history of the George circle after the death of Stefan Georges in 1933, Raulff received the Leipzig Book Fair Prize 2010 in the category "Non-fiction and essayistics".
- In 1998, he was awarded the Science Prize of the Aby-Warburg Foundation, 2013 with the Ernst Robert Curtius Prize.
- In 2013, he received the Officer's Cross of the Order of Merit of the Federal Republic of Germany.

== Bibliography ==
- Warburg, Aby Moritz (1995). Schlangenritual ein Reisebericht (in German). Berlin: Wagenbach. ISBN 978-3-8031-3031-0. OCLC 603443937.
- Raulff, Ulrich (1995). Ein Historiker im 20. Jahrhundert : Marc Bloch (in German). Frankfurt am Main: S. Fischer. ISBN 3-10-062909-4. OCLC 33450894.
- Raulff, Ulrich (1999). Der unsichtbare Augenblick : Zeitkonzepte in der Geschichte (in German). Göttingen: Wallstein. ISBN 3-89244-346-7. OCLC 50169532.
- Raulff, Ulrich (2003). Wilde Energien : vier Versuche zu Aby Warburg (in German). Göttingen: Wallstein. ISBN 3-89244-674-1. OCLC 53332301.
- Bernard, Andreas; Raulff, Ulrich (2003). Theodor W. Adorno, "Minima Moralia" neu gelesen (in German). Frankfurt am Main: Suhrkamp. ISBN 3-518-12284-3. OCLC 51862778.
- Raulff, Ulrich; Näfelt, Lutz; Jaegle, Dietmar; Deutsches Literaturarchiv Marbach; Literaturmuseum der Moderne; Ausstellung Das Geheime Deutschland. Eine Ausgrabung Marbach am Neckar (2008). Das geheime Deutschland eine Ausgrabung; Köpfe aus dem George-Kreis; [zur Ausstellung: "Das Geheime Deutschland. Eine Ausgrabung", Literaturmuseum der Moderne, Marbach am Neckar, 13. März 2008 bis 31. August 2008] (in German). Marbach am Neckar: Dt. Schillergesellschaft. ISBN 978-3-937384-37-5. OCLC 227341003.
- Raulff, Ulrich (2009). Kreis ohne Meister : Stefan Georges Nachleben (in German). München: C.H. Beck. ISBN 978-3-406-59225-6. OCLC 441147941.
- Raulff, Ulrich (2014). Wiedersehen mit den Siebzigern die wilden Jahre des Lesens (in German). Stuttgart: Klett-Cotta. ISBN 978-3-608-94893-6. OCLC 879494046.
- Raulff, Ulrich (2015). Das letzte Jahrhundert der Pferde : Geschichte einer Trennung (in German). München: C.H. Beck. ISBN 978-3-406-68245-2. OCLC 923734343.
- Raulff, Ulrich; Kemp, Ruth Ahmedzai (2017). Farewell to the horse : the final century of our relationship. [London] UK: Allen Lane, an imprint of Penguin Books. ISBN 978-0-241-25760-9. OCLC 988233898.
- Raulff, Ulrich (2025). Wie es euch gefällt (in German). München: C.H.Beck. ISBN 978-3-406-83730-2.

=== Critical studies and reviews of Raulff's work ===
- Klinkenborg, Verlyn (22 February 2018). "A horse is a horse, of course". The New York Review of Books. 65 (3): 46–47. Review of Farewell to the horse.
