= Wolfgang Herrndorf =

German novelist, painter, and illustrator (1965–2013)

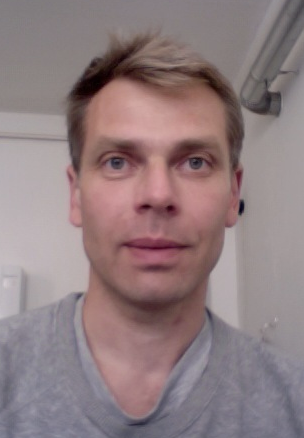
- Herrndorf in 2011
- Born: Wolfgang Herrndorf; 12 June 1965; Hamburg, West Germany (now Germany)
- Died: 26 August 2013 (aged 48); Berlin, Germany
- Resting place: Dorotheenstadt Cemetery, Berlin
- Education: Academy of Fine Arts, Nuremberg
- Occupations: Author, painter, illustrator, blogger
- Spouse: Carola Wimmer (m. 2013)
- Writing career
- Pen name: Stimmen (for his blogs)
- Years active: 2001–2013
- Genres: Dramedy, satire, social novel
- Subjects: Unreliable narrator, poetry, self-criticism

Wolfgang Herrndorf (12 June 1965 in Hamburg – 26 August 2013 in Berlin) was a German author, painter, and illustrator.

== Life and career ==
His debut novel In Plüschgewittern was published by Zweitausendeins in 2001. Despite the protagonist's age of approximately 30 years, Herrndorf describes the book as a youth novel. Critics called it a pop novel. A reworked version of In Plüschgewittern was published by Rowohlt in 2008. The Eichborn Verlag published a collection of his interconnected short stories as Diesseits des Van-Allen-Gürtels in 2007. A fictional interview between Herrndorf and an untrustworthy Cosmonaut, with many traces of science- fiction, was released the same year, by SuKuLTuR-Verlag: Unreliable narrators are a recurring element in Herrndorf's fiction, which is attributed to the influence of Vladimir Nabokov.

His critically and commercially biggest success was the novel Tschick (published as Why We Took the Car in English), a bildungsroman about two fourteen-year-old boys. The book was featured on the German list of bestselling books for over a year. He published his next novel Sand in November 2011. The novel contains elements of crime fiction, society novels and historical novels. Herrndorf quipped, the novel could belong to the genre of the "Trottelroman" (idiot novel). Sand won the Leipzig Book Fair Prize in 2012, ‘’Tschick’’ was nominated for the same prize the year before. Herrndorf's friend Robert Koall accepted the prize in Herrndorf's stead. Sand also made it to the shortlist of the German Book Prize.

Herrndorf, who lived in Berlin, regularly wrote in the web forum "Wir höflichen Paparazzi" (a German web forum that reports on random encounters with celebrities), which is acknowledged to have had a strong influence on Herrndorf and worked as a space for resonance. He also contributed to "Riesenmaschine" (a German collaborative webblog). He was a member of the national authors football team "Autonama". After being diagnosed with a malignant brain tumour (glioblastoma) in February 2010, he began a digital diary called "das Blog Arbeit und Struktur" (the blog Work and Structure) in which he reports about his deadly illness. It was posthumously published in December 2013 by Rowohlt in book form, as the author had requested.

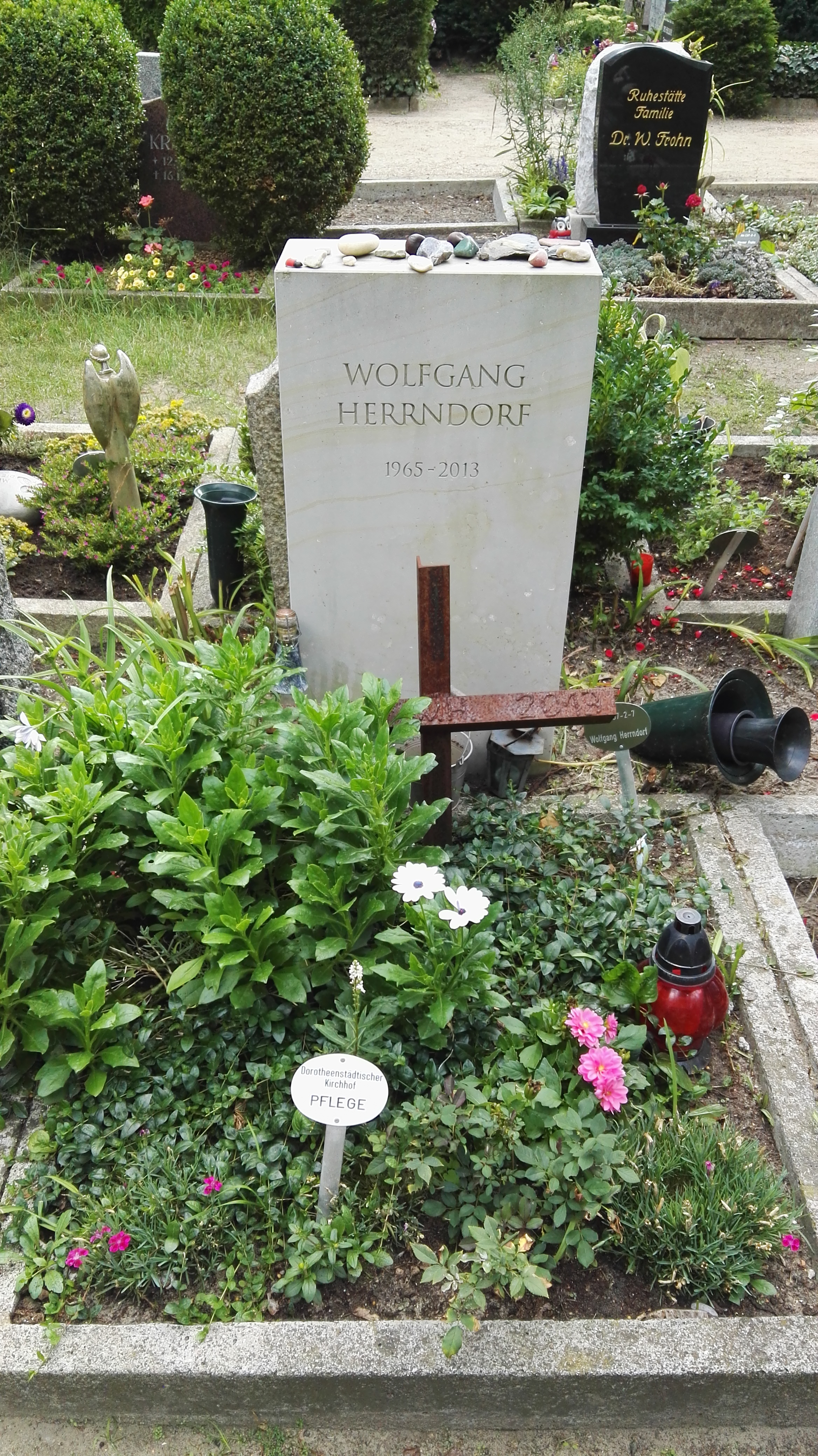
Herrndorf's grave in Dorotheenstadt

On 26 August 2013 Herrndorf committed suicide in Berlin. He was interred at the Dorotheenstadt cemetery in Berlin. In 2014 Rowohlt published the sequel of Tschick from Isa's point of view as an unfinished novel with the title Bilder deiner großen Liebe (Pictures Of Your True Love). The epilogue by Kathrin Passig and Marcus Gärtner states that Herrndorf himself approved the release and determined the title. The book was first performed as a play in 2015 at the Staatsschauspiel Dresden, directed by Jan Gehlers.

== Bibliography ==
=== Novels ===
- 2002 – In Plüschgewittern
- 2010 – Tschick
- 2011 – Sand
- 2014 – Bilder deiner großen Liebe – unfinished

=== Nonfiction ===
- 2013 – Arbeit und Struktur

=== Other works ===
- 1998 – with Jürgen Roth: Heribert Faßbender – Gesammelte Werke. Band IX/5: Europameisterschaft 1996, Italien–Deutschland. (As Editor)
- 2007 – Diesseits des Van-Allen-Gürtels (A collection of six short stories)
- 2007 – Die Rosenbaum-Doktrin (A fictional interview. Published in Schöner Lesen, Issue #64)
- 2018: Stimmen. Texte, die bleiben sollten (A collection of literary texts written between 2001 and 2010.)

== Exhibitions ==
- 2017: Das unbekannte Kapitel. Wolfgang Herrndorfs Bilder. Kunsthaus Stade, June – October 2017
- 2015: Wolfgang Herrndorf: Bilder. Literaturhaus Berlin, June – September 2015
- 2016: „Zitate" – Bilder von Wolfgang Herrndorf. Literaturhaus Munich, July – September 2016

== Awards ==
- 2008 – Deutscher Erzählerpreis für Diesseits des Van-Allen-Gürtels
- 2011 – Leipzig Book Fair Prize (Category: Fiction) für Why We Took the Car (Nominated)
- 2011 – Clemens-Brentano-Preis für Why We Took the Car
- 2011 – Deutscher Jugendliteraturpreis für Why We Took the Car
- 2012 – Hans Fallada Prize
- 2012 – Leipzig Book Fair Prize (Category: Fiction) für Sand
- 2012 – Literaturpreis des Kulturkreises der deutschen Wirtschaft
