= Sand (novel) =

2011 novel by Wolfgang Herrndorf

- First German edition cover
- Author: Wolfgang Herrndorf
- Original title: Sand
- Language: German
- Genre: Thriller, espionage, crime
- Set in: Port city of Targat, Tindirma oasis, Africa
- Publisher: Rowohlt Verlag
- Publication date: 15 November 2011
- Publication place: Germany
- Media type: Print (hardback and paperback)
- Pages: 480
- ISBN: 978-3-87134-734-4
- Preceded by: Why We Took the Car

Sand is a 2011 novel by the German writer Wolfgang Herrndorf. It won the Leipzig Book Fair Prize in 2012. It is the last novel that Herrndorf was able to complete before his death in August 2013.

== See also ==
- 2011 in literature
- German literature
