= Eva Lüdi Kong =

Swiss sinologist (born 1968)

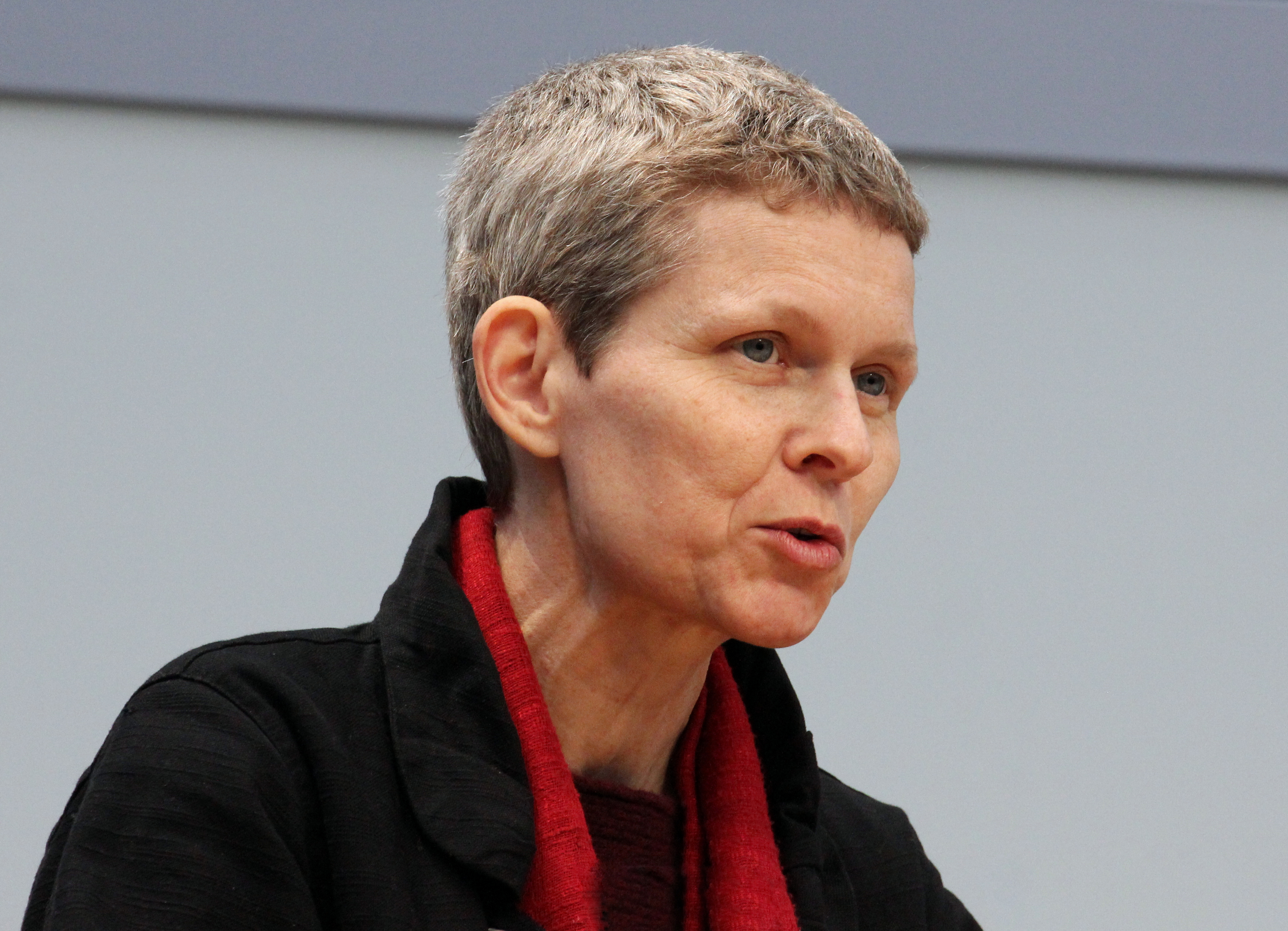
Eva Lüdi Kong

Eva Lüdi Kong (born 1968) is a Swiss sinologist, translator, and cultural mediator.

== Life ==
Eva Lüdi Kong studied Sinology in Zurich and Chinese calligraphy and printmaking at the Chinese University of the Arts in Hangzhou (Zhejiang). She completed further studies in classical Chinese literature at Zhejiang University with a master's degree. During her studies she worked as a language teacher, interpreter and translator. Lüdi Kong lived and worked from 1990 to 2016 mainly in China, where she was also active in teaching and research.

Today Lüdi Kong works primarily as a freelance translator and in cultural mediation in Switzerland and Germany. For the first complete German translation of the classic Chinese novel Journey to the West, she received the Leipzig Book Fair Prize in 2017. Lüdi Kong worked for seventeen years on the translation of the work that was written by Wu Cheng'en in the 16th century at the time of the Ming Dynasty and is one of the four classical novels in Chinese literature. The Reclam publishing house invested 80,000 euros into the publication of the 1300-page work that weighs 1.5 kg. Lüdi Kong considers The Journey to the West to be a "joint work of many generations of storytellers" and, compared to the other three classic novels, easy to read. She compared the novel in a scientific paper, among others. with Dante Alighieri's Divine Comedy, since a search for the "right path" is also described there.

== Works ==
- 2002: Hefte für ostasiatische Literatur Nr. 32, Iudicium Verlag, München, ISBN 978-3-89129-355-3 • ISSN 0933-8721. Wu kong – Die Leere erkennen: Das 1. Kapitel des Romans Die Reise in den Westen (Aus dem Chinesischen von Eva Luedi Kong).
- 2005: Mahjong : chinesische Gegenwartskunst aus der Sammlung Sigg. Hatje Cantz, Ostfildern-Ruit, ISBN 978-3-7757-1612-3 (anlässlich der Ausstellung Mahjong – Chinesische Gegenwartskunst aus der Sammlung Sigg, Kunstmuseum Bern 13. Juni – 16. Oktober 2005, Hamburger Kunsthalle Herbst 2006, herausgegeben von Bernhard Fibicher und Matthias Frehner, Textbeiträge u. a. von Ai Weiwei und Werknotizen u. a. von Nataline Colonnello; Übersetzung: Udo Breger und Eva Lüdi-Kong).
- 2006: Typo China / Museum für Gestaltung Zürich, Plakatsammlung. Mit einem Essay von Eva Lüdi Kong. Konzept, Redaktion: Felix Studinka, Christina Reble. Übersetzung: Michael Robinson; Müller, Baden, ISBN 978-3-03778-078-7.
- 2006: Parkett No.76. Übersetzung v. Zhang Wei, Gedankenwandel – Eigentlich ist das Leben schön.
- 2008: Mingjun Luo, Verwehter Staub, Verlag für moderne Kunst Nürnberg. Übersetzung diverser Texte.
- 2010: Culturescapes China – Chinas Kulturszene ab 2000, Chr. Merian Verlag, ISBN 978-3-85616-514-7. Übersetzung diverser Texte.
- 2010: Hefte für ostasiatische Literatur Nr. 48/49, Iudicium Verlag, München, ISBN 978-3-86205-174-8 • ISSN 0933-8721. Übersetzung v. Zhao Chuan: Shanghai, Linie Nr. 49.
- 2014: Materialdienst (Zeitschrift für Religions- und Weltanschauungsfragen, EZW), 77. Jahrgang. Übersetzung v. Cui Liming, Leid und Erlösung – Ein Daoist blickt auf drei Religionen.
- 2014: Journal of Contemporary Chinese Art, Vol. 1. No. 1, ISSN 2051-7041. Jörg Huber & Eva Lüdi Kong, Care of the Self.
- 2015: Leuchtspur. Neue chinesische Literatur, Foreign Languages Press, Beijing, ISBN 978-7-119-09627-8. Übersetzung v. Han Shaogong, Die Prophezeiung am Nordtor; He Jianming, John Rabe.
- 2016: Leuchtspur. Neue chinesische Literatur, Foreign Languages Press, Beijing, ISBN 978-7-119-10182-8. Übersetzung von Zhao Zhiming, Der Hundertfüsser im Fels.
- 2016: Viceversa – Jahrbuch der Schweizer Literaturen, Limmat Verlag, Zürich, ISBN 978-3-85869-685-4, Übersetzung und Kommentar: Zhang Dai, Sommervollmond am Westsee und andere Texte.
- 2016: Die Reise in den Westen. Roman, übersetzt, kommentiert und herausgegeben von Eva Lüdi Kong, Reclam, Stuttgart, ISBN 978-3-15-010879-6.
- 2018: Zhou Xingsi, Der Tausend-Zeichen-Klassiker. Chinas älteste Grundschulfibel und bekannteste Textgrundlage der Schriftkunst. Übersetzt und kommentiert von Eva Lüdi Kong, Reclam 2018.
- 2019: Der Schlüssel zur «Reise in den Westen» – Entstehung und Deutung des Romans. Übersetzt und herausgegeben von Eva Lüdi Kong. Reclam 2019.
