= Laura Münkler =

German professor of public law and healthcare law

Laura Münkler (born 1985) is a German professor of public law and healthcare law at the University of Greifswald.

== Life ==
Laura Münkler was born into a family of scholars in Friedberg, Hesse. She is the daughter of political scientist Herfried Münkler and literary scholar Marina Münkler. In 2004, she passed the Abitur before taking up legal studies at Humboldt University of Berlin. She also passed both legal Staatsexamen in 2009 and 2011 in Berlin.

From 2009 to 2012, Laura Münkler was a research fellow at Humboldt University and a DAAD lecturer at the Paris Nanterre University. In 2012, she was admitted to the bar and briefly joined a law firm before becoming a research fellow with Jens Kersten at LMU Munich.

In 2014, she was awarded a doctorate. Her dissertation was awarded both the faculty prize and the prize of the Münchener Juristische Gesellschaft.

Laura Münkler was habilitated in 2020 in public law, healthcare law and legal theory and in the same year became a professor at Greifswald University. Her habilitation thesis deals with the relationship between experts, politics, and the law. Münkler argues that the supremacy of law and politics over what the experts say must prevail because in the end it is a political matter how to deal with an expert's opinion of any other faculty.

== Writings ==
- Kosten-Nutzen-Bewertungen in der gesetzlichen Krankenversicherung. Eine Perspektive zur Ausgestaltung des krankenversicherungsrechtlichen Wirtschaftlichkeitsgebots?, Schriftenreihe zum Gesundheitsrecht Band 33, 357 Seiten, Duncker & Humblot, Berlin, 2015 (Dissertation), ISBN 978-3-428-14471-6.
- Münkler, Laura (2020). Expertokratie. Zwischen Herrschaft kraft Wissens und politischem Dezisionismus. Jus Publicum. Vol. 292 (1 ed.). Tübingen: Mohr Siebeck. doi:10.1628/978-3-16-159643-8. ISBN 978-3-16-159642-1. S2CID 241616414.
