= Sascha Lobo =

German blogger and journalist

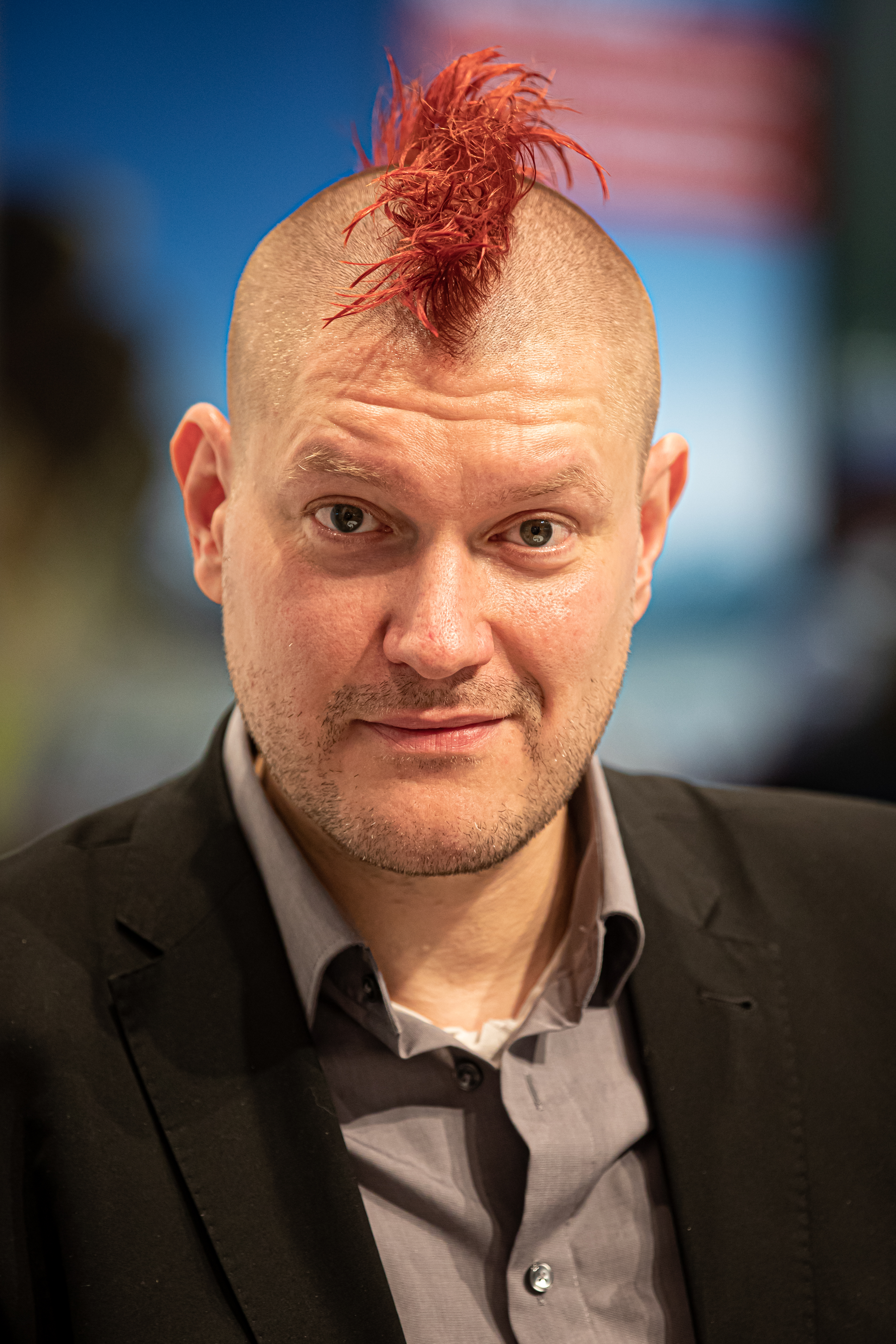
- Lobo at the Frankfurt Book Fair in 2019
- Born: 11 May 1975 (age 51)
- Occupations: Blogger; journalist; writer

Sascha Lobo (born 11 May 1975 in Berlin) is a German blogger, writer, journalist, Audiobook-narrator and copywriter. Lobo's work is primarily concerned with the Internet and with the social effects of new technology.

== Career ==
In 2000, Lobo founded a short-lived advertising agency, and in the following years worked in advertising while also writing for the magazine Blond. In 2005 he co-founded the blog Riesenmaschine. The following year his book Wir nennen es Arbeit (engl. "We call it work", co-written with Holm Friebe) was published.

In 2007 Lobo co-founded adical (later renamed adnation), a blog-focussed marketing agency.

His first novel Strohfeuer was published in September 2010.

He joined the Advisory Board of the iu Internationale Hochschule in September 2023.

== Books ==
- Holm Friebe, Sascha Lobo: Wir nennen es Arbeit – die digitale Bohème oder: intelligentes Leben jenseits der Festanstellung. Heyne, München 2006. ISBN 978-3-453-60056-0
- Kathrin Passig, Holm Friebe, Aleks Scholz, Sascha Lobo (Hrsg.): Riesenmaschine – das Beste aus dem brandneuen Universum. Heyne, München 2007. ISBN 978-3-453-61001-9
- Kathrin Passig, Sascha Lobo: Dinge geregelt kriegen – ohne einen Funken Selbstdisziplin. Rowohlt, Berlin 2008. ISBN 978-3-87134-619-4
- Sascha Lobo: Strohfeuer Rowohlt, Berlin 2010. ISBN 978-3-87134-678-1
- Sascha Lobo: Realitätsschock Kiepenheuer & Witsch, Köln 2019. ISBN 978-3-46205-322-7
- Sascha Lobo: Realitätsschock: Zehn Lehren aus der Gegenwart + neu: Der Corona-Schock. KiWi-Taschenbuch, Köln 2020. ISBN 978-3462000436
- Sascha Lobo: Die große Vertrauenskrise: Ein Bewältigungskompass, publisher: Kiepenheuer & Witsch, 2023

== Audiobooks ==
- 2019: Realitätsschock: Zehn Lehren aus der Gegenwart (abridged, read by Sascha Lobo), Random House Audio, ISBN 978-3837149111
- 2019: Realitätsschock: Zehn Lehren aus der Gegenwart (Audiobook-download, unabridged, read by Sascha Lobo), Random House Audio, ISBN 978-3-8371-4913-5
- 2023: Die große Vertrauenskrise: Ein Bewältigungskompass (Audiobook-download, unabridged, read by Sascha Lobo), publisher: Argon Verlag
