= Ernst-Robert-Curtius-Preis =

Literary award for German language essayists

Ernst-Robert-Curtius-Preis was a German literary prize, named after the literary scholar Ernst Robert Curtius. It was founded in 1984, and recognizes outstanding essay writers. The prize was awarded until 2015 at the Rheinische Friedrich-Wilhelms-Universität in Bonn and endowed with €8,000 (Förderpreis: €4,000).

== Recipients ==
FP: Förderpreis

- 1984: Golo Mann
- 1985: Kurt Sontheimer
- 1986: Hilde Spiel, FP: Ulrich Holbein and Thomas Lautwein
- 1987: Wolf Jobst Siedler, FP: Uwe Schmitt
- 1988: François Bondy, FP: Walter van Rossum
- 1989: Friedrich Dürrenmatt, FP: Jens Jessen
- 1990: Hermann Lübbe, FP: Verena Lenzen
- 1991: Günter Kunert, FP: Norbert Hinterberger
- 1992: Werner Ross, FP: Jörg Lau
- 1993: Peter Sloterdijk, FP: Joachim Vogel
- 1994: Karl Dietrich Bracher, FP: Thomas Hettche
- 1995: Hubert Markl, FP: Michael Maar
- 1996: Odo Marquard, FP: Helmut Böttiger
- 1997: Hans Magnus Enzensberger, FP: Doron Rabinovici
- 1998: Rüdiger Safranski, FP: Franziska Augstein
- 1999: Hans-Peter Schwarz, FP: Florian Illies
- 2000: Günter de Bruyn, FP: Ulf Poschardt
- 2001: Hans Küng, FP: Christiane Florin
- 2003: Brigitte Hamann, FP: Adriano Sack
- 2005: Dieter Wellershoff, FP: Thomas Speckmann
- 2007: Silvia Bovenschen, FP: Felicitas von Lovenberg
- 2009: Richard Schröder, FP: Raoul Löbbert
- 2011: Aleida Assmann, FP: Timo Frasch
- 2013: Ulrich Raulff, FP: Adam Soboczynski
- 2015: Josef Isensee, FP: Philipp Felsch
