= Paul Maar =

German novelist

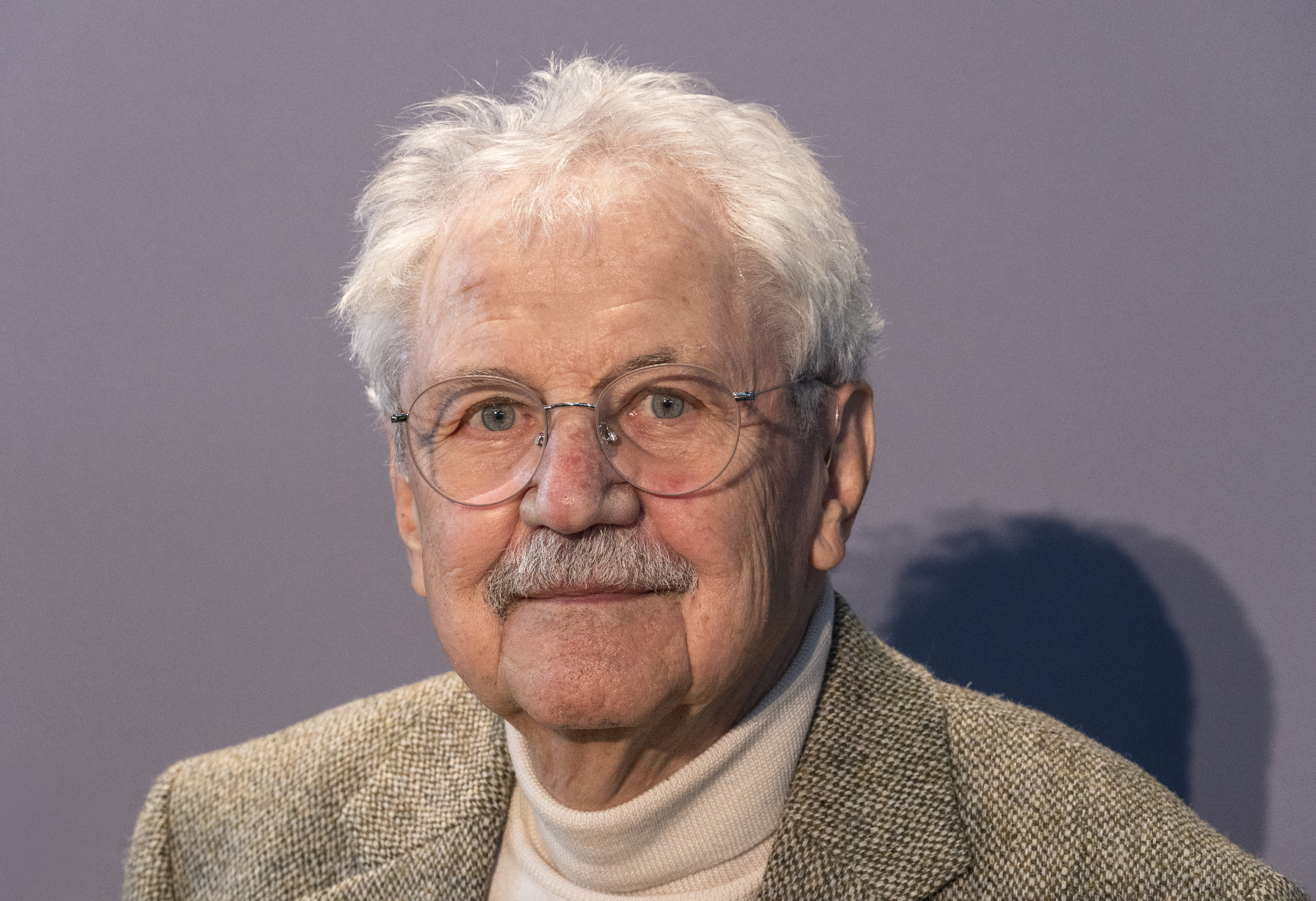
- Paul Maar at the Frankfurt Book Fair 2025
- Born: 13 December 1937 (age 88); Schweinfurt
- Occupations: novelist, playwright, translator, illustrator

Paul Maar (German: [paʊ̯l maːɐ̯]; born 13 December 1937) is a German novelist, playwright, translator, and illustrator notable for his contributions to children's literature.

== Life ==
Maar was born in Schweinfurt. After the early death of his mother he lived with his grandfather in the rural area of Theres in northern Bavaria. He went to school at the Gymnasium in Schweinfurt, and later studied at the State Academy of Arts in Stuttgart. He then worked as a stage designer and stage photographer for the Franconian castle theatre Massbach. After that he spent ten years as an art teacher. Since 1976, he has worked as a freelance writer. He lives in Bamberg with his wife and three children.

== Bibliography ==
Maar is the author of a large number of novels, short stories and plays. His most read works are a series of books about Sams, a creature with red hair and a pig's nose that can grant wishes and, if it does, shows up on Sams-Day (i. e., Saturday), and the stories about the Little Kangaroo. He has also written many of the Augsburger Puppenkiste classics. He has been given many awards, among others the German Youth Literature Prize, the Austrian State Prize and the Brothers Grimm Prize of the State of Berlin.

- Der tätowierte Hund (Oetinger, English: The Tattooed Dog, 1968) ISBN 9783789142574
- Der verhexte Knödeltopf (1970)
- Der König in der Kiste (1971)
- Kikerikiste (1972)
- Summelsarium (1973)
- Eine Woche voller Samstage (1973)
- Andere Kinder wohnen auch bei ihren Eltern (1976)
- Onkel Florians fliegender Flohmarkt (1977)
- Am Samstag kam das Sams zurück (1980)
- Die Eisenbahn-Oma (1981)
- Die vergessene Tür (1982)
- Anne will ein Zwilling werden (1982)
- Tier-ABC (1983)
- Lippels Traum (1984)
- Kindertheaterstücke (1984)
- Die Opodeldocks (1985)
- Robert und Trebor (1985)
- Der Tag an dem Tante Marga verschwand und andere Geschichten (1986)
- Türme (1987)
- Konrad Knifflichs Knobelkoffer (1987)
- Dann wird es wohl das Nashorn sein (1988)
- Das kleine Känguru auf Abenteuer (1989)
- Kartoffelkäferzeiten (1990)
- Das kleine Känguru lernt fliegen (1990)
- Das kleine Känguruh und seine Freunde (1991)
- Das kleine Känguruh und der Angsthase (1991)
- Neue Punkte für das Sams (1992)
- Anne macht alles nach (1992)
- Neben mir ist noch Platz (1993)
- Neue Kindertheaterstücke (1993)
- Jacob und der große Junge (1993)
- Tina und Timmi kennen sich nicht (1995)
- Ein Sams für Martin Taschenbier (1996)
- Der gelbe Pulli (1996)
- Der Buchstabenfresser (1996)
- Die Maus, die hat Geburtstag heut (1997)
- Kreuz und Rüben, Kraut und quer (1997)
- Tina und Timmi machen einen Ausflug (1997)
- Matti, Momme und die Zauberbohnen (1997)
- Das kleine Känguru in Gefahr (1998)
- In einem tiefen, dunklen Wald (1999)
- Das Sams wird Filmstar (2001)
- Tierische Freundschaften (2001)
- Sams in Gefahr (2002)
- Die Kuh Gloria (2002)
- Hase und Bär (2003)
- Friedlich schlafen kleine Drachen (2003)
- Große Schwester, fremder Bruder (2004)
- Wer ist der Größte? (2004)
- Herr Bello und das blaue Wunder (2005)
- Der verborgene Schatz (2005)
- Onkel Alwin und das Sams (2009)

Three films have been made of the Sams books:

- Das Sams (English The Slurb) - 2001
- Sams in Gefahr (English name My Magical Friend Sams) - 2003
- Sams im Glück - 2012.
