= Regina Scheer =

German woman historian

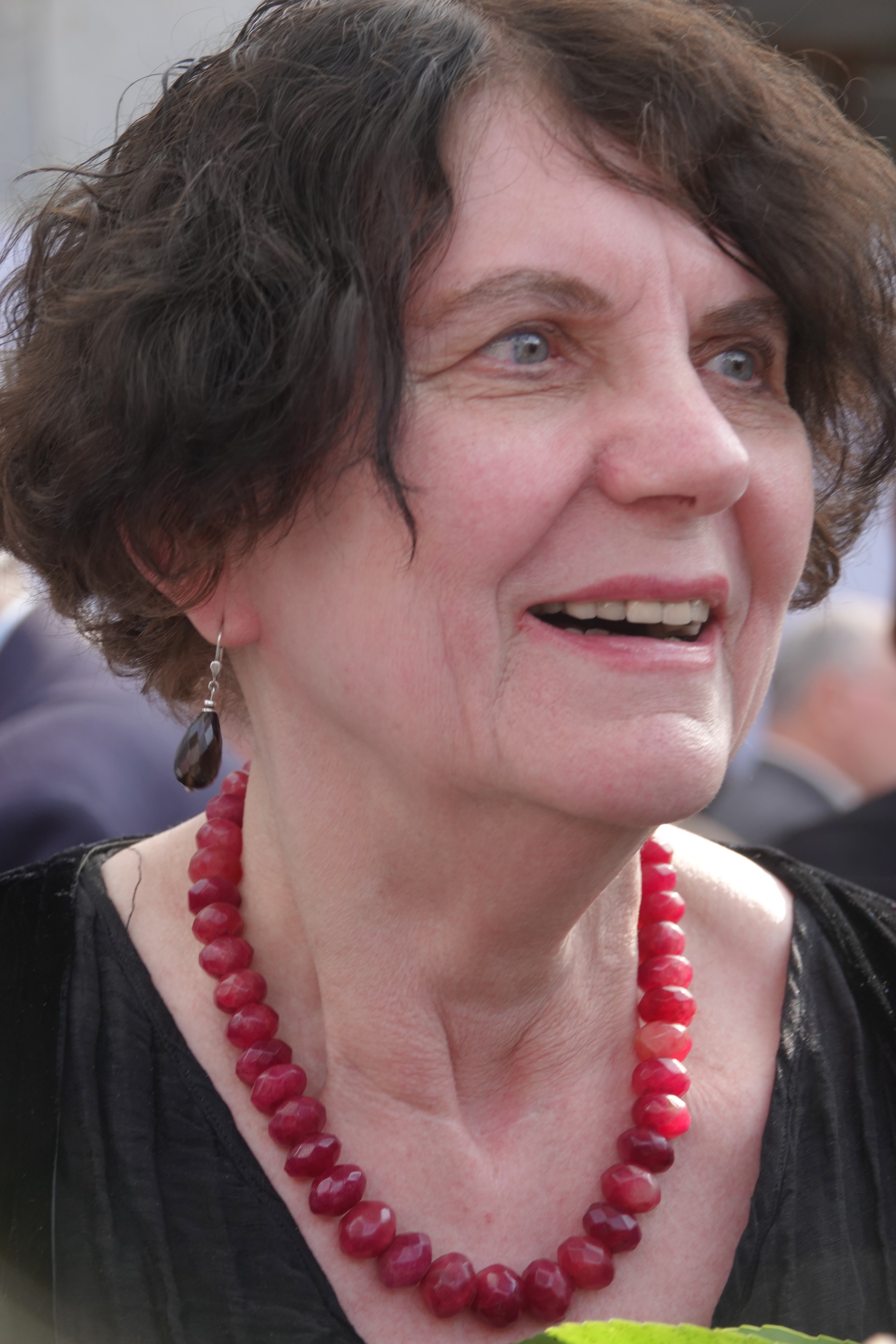

Regina Scheer (born in 1950) is a German writer and historian.

== Professional career ==
Born in East-Berlin, Scheer studied theatre and cultural studies from 1968 to 1973 at the Humboldt-Universität zu Berlin. She was a copywriter at Oktoberklub. From 1972 to 1976, she was editor of Forum, the student newspaper of Freie Deutsche Jugend (Free German Youth); and from 1980 to 1990 she was an editor at the literary magazine Temperamente. Since the Peaceful Revolution, she has worked as a freelance journalist, historian and editor.

Scheer published several books on German-Jewish history and had her first novel Machandel published in 2014.

== Awards ==
- 2014: Mara-Cassens-Preis
- 2017: Ver.di-Literaturpreis Berlin-Brandenburg

== Publications ==
- AHAWAH, das vergessene Haus. Aufbau, Berlin 1992
- Es gingen Wasser wild über unsere Seele. Aufbau, Berlin 1999
- Der Umgang mit den Denkmälern. Brandenburgische Landeszentrale für politische Bildung, Potsdam 2003
- Im Schatten der Sterne. Aufbau, Berlin 2004
- Wir sind die Liebermanns. Propyläen, Berlin 2006
- Mausche mi-Dessau Moses Mendelssohn. Hentrich & Hentrich, Teetz 2006
- Den Schwächeren helfen, stark zu sein. Die Schrippenkirche im Berliner Wedding 1882–2007. Hentrich & Hentrich, Teetz 2007, ISBN 978-3-938485-63-7
- Kurt Tucholsky. Hentrich & Hentrich, Teetz 2008
- Zerbrochene Bilder. Kurt-Tucholsky-Literaturmuseum, Rheinsberg 2011
- Zerstörte Kindheit und Jugend. Mein Leben und Überleben in Berlin. together with Regina Steinitz, Berlin, 2014, Memorial to the Murdered Jews of Europe, ISBN 978-3-942240-16-1.
- Machandel.
- After Auschwitz: The Difficult Legacies of the GDR. 2021.
