= Kathrin Passig =

German writer (born 1970)

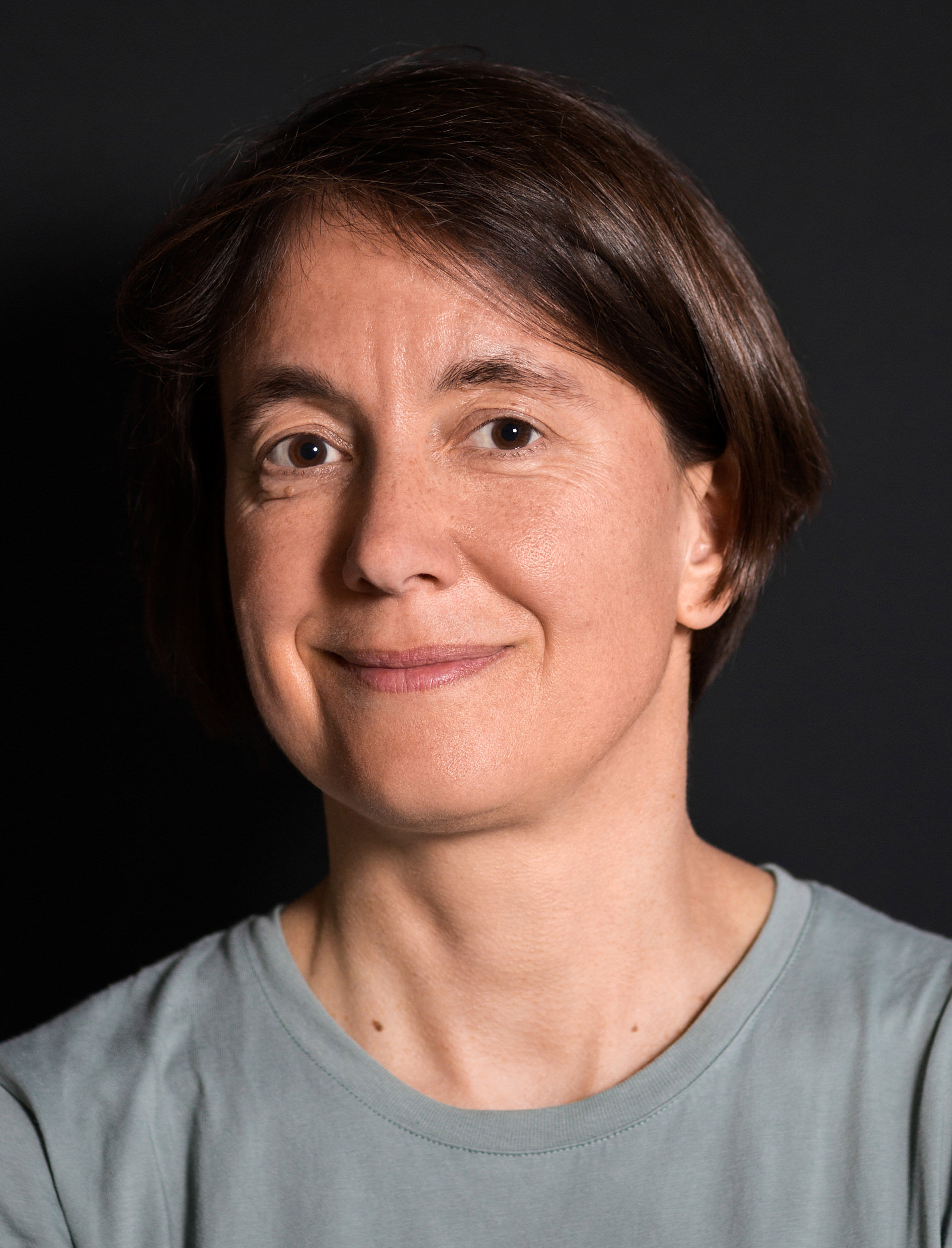
- Passig in 2016
- Born: 4 June 1970 (age 56); Deggendorf, West Germany (now Germany)
- Occupation: Writer
- Writing career
- Period: Late 20th – early 21st century
- Genres: Non-fiction books, short story
- Notable works: You Are Here (2006), Lexikon des Unwissens (2007)
- Notable awards: Ingeborg Bachmann Prize; 2006

Kathrin Passig (born 4 June 1970) is a German author.

== Biography ==
Passig was born in 1970 in Deggendorf, a small town in Lower Bavaria. She is editor and programmer of the blog "Riesenmaschine" which received the Grimme Online Award 2006, awarded by the renowned Adolf-Grimme-Institut. The same year, her short story "Sie befinden sich hier" ("You are here") got her the Ingeborg Bachmann Prize. One of her most successful books is "Lexikon des Unwissens – Worauf es bisher keine Antwort gibt" ("Encyclopedia of Ignorance – Everything we don't know so far") published by Rowohlt in 2007.

She also works as a translator, among her translations are works by William Leonard Marshall, Bob Dylan, Jacob Weisberg, and Harlan Coben.

== Works ==
- with Ira Strübel: Die Wahl der Qual (2000, Rowohlt)
- Sie befinden sich hier (2006, transl. You are here by Lucy Powell)
- with Holm Friebe: Das nächste große Ding (2007, Rowohlt)
- with Aleks Scholz: Lexikon des Unwissens (2007, Rowohlt)
- with Ira Strübel: Strübel & Passig. Gesammelte Kolumnen (2007, Verbrecher)
- with Sascha Lobo: Dinge geregelt kriegen – ohne einen Funken Selbstdisziplin (2009, Rowohlt)
- with Aleks Scholz: Verirren. Eine Anleitung für Anfänger und Fortgeschrittene (2010, Rowohlt)
- with Aleks Scholz and Kai Schreiber: Das neue Lexikon des Unwissens. (2011, Rowohlt)
- with Sascha Lobo: Internet – Segen oder Fluch (2012, Rowohlt)
- with Johannes Jander: Weniger schlecht programmieren (2013, O'Reilly)
