= Lichtung =

Poem by Ernst Jandl

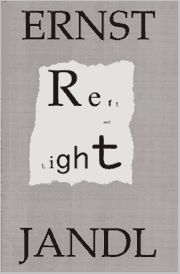
Book cover of Ernst Jandl Reft and Light (2000)

lichtung is a poem of Austrian author Ernst Jandl, which combines deliberations about the directions left and right with a change of the letters l and r, so resulting in "lechts und rinks" instead of "rechts und links". It was published in Jandl's first volume of poems, Laut and Luise (another pun, on loud "sound" and Luise, a female name sounding like "leise", quiet), in 1966 and, while it consists of just one stanza, it is among the most cited of Jandl's poetry.

== Content ==
The l and r replacement happens in each sentence, as applicable, so not in the first one ("manche meinen"). As the German language is so engrained in Ernst Jandl's poems that they are nearly impossible to translate, English authors have tried to transfer the approach in various adaptations, from close imitations to freewheeling versions that continue Jandl's thinking into other semantic areas.

== Reception ==
Hans Helmut Hiebel saw the poem as the basis for Jandl's receiving the Georg-Büchner-Preis in 1984. It is a mainstay of 20th century lyrics. Marcel Reich-Ranicki included it in his Kanon der deutschen Literatur and his personal list of 100 essential poems. Hermann Korte classes "lichtung" together with "ottos mops" and "auf dem land" as Jandl's most popular school book poems.

On the occasion of Jandl's 65th birthday, die tageszeitung exchanged all ls and rs in their 1 August 1990 title.

=== Further reading (in German) ===
- Volker Hage. "Verwechslung möglich". In: Marcel Reich-Ranicki (ed.): Hundert Gedichte des Jahrhunderts. Frankfurt am Main: Insel, 2000, ISBN 3-458-17012-X, pp. 330–32.
- Hans Helmut Hiebel. Das Spektrum der modernen Poesie. Interpretationen deutschsprachiger Lyrik 1900–2000 im internationalen Kontext der Moderne. Teil II (1945–2000), Würzburg: Königshausen & Neumann, 2006, ISBN 3-8260-3201-2, pp. 239–41.
