= Dinev =

Dinev (Bulgarian: Динев) is a Bulgarian masculine surname, its feminine counterpart is Dineva. It may refer to

- Dimitré Dinev (born 1968), Bulgarian-born Austrian writer
- Ivan Dinev (born 1978), Bulgarian figure skater
- Nikola Dinev (1953–2019), Bulgarian Olympic wrestler
- Zhivko Dinev (born 1987), Bulgarian football player
