= Janker =

Janker may refer to:

- Christoph Janker, German soccer player
- Josef W. Janker, German author
- Jankers, vernacular term for minor punishments within the British Armed Forces
- Janker (jacket), a traditional item of clothing in much of southern Germany, Switzerland, Austria and northern Italy
