= Ottos mops =

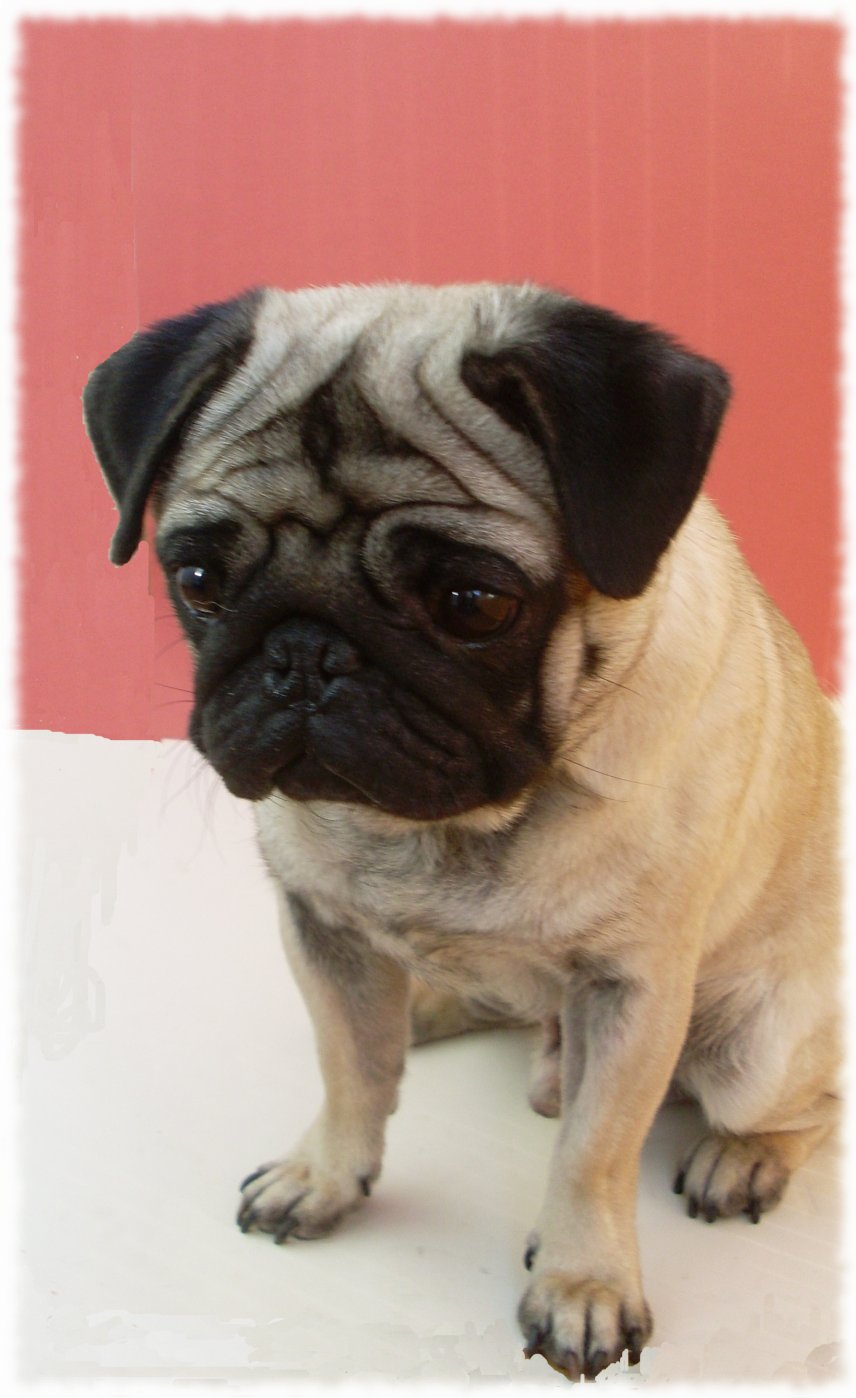
A pug

ottos mops [Eng: Otto's pug] is a poem by Austrian poet Ernst Jandl. It is thought to have been written on the 20th of November, 1963, and was first published in 1970 in Jandl's volume Der künstliche Baum [Eng: the artificial tree]. The poem is made up of simple sentences of two to four words that contain exclusively the vowel "o". It tells the story of a short episode in the life of a dog and its owner: after Otto sends his badly behaved pug away, he begins to miss it and calls it back. The reaction of the returning pug is, however, not quite what is expected: it vomits.

Ottos mops is one of Jandl's most famous humorous poems. The author himself labelled it a 'Sprechgedicht': a poem that creates its particular effect best when read aloud. It is frequently used in German schools as an example of concrete poetry, and has inspired several imitations by other poets, and by children.

== Content and style ==
Ernst Jandl's ottos mops and Elizabeth MacKiernan's Lulu's Pooch
link to full text

(please observe copyright laws)

ottos mops is made up of 14 lines divided into three stanzas. At the beginning, a badly behaved pug is sent away by his owner, Otto.

_{"}ottos mops trotzt
otto: fort mops fort
ottos mops hopst fort"

[otto's pug defies him
otto: away pug away
otto's pug hops away]

Otto comments on the fact that the pug follows his command with the word "soso". Then he completes every-day activities, such as fetching coke and fruit. After a while, he listens for the pug, calls it, and hopes that it returns. The pug knocks, and is greeted joyfully by Otto, but its reaction is unexpected:

_{"}ottos mops kommt
ottos mops kotzt
otto: ogottogott"

[otto's pug comes
otto's pug pukes
otto: ohgodohgod]

Because the sound of the poem is so important, a literal translation such as that above does not do it justice. Translations of ottos mops therefore tend to carry the basic structure of the poem into other languages, conveying Jandl's word play freely. As such, Elizabeth MacKiernan translated ottos mops for the US-American Jandl poetry collection Reft and Light as Lulu's Pooch. In 2005, the online service sightandsight.com held a competition to translate ottos mops in honor of Jandl's 80th birthday. Scottish scholar of German Brian O. Murdoch won with his poem "fritz's bitch".

== Text analysis ==
The most striking feature of the poem ottos mops is that it is univocalic: all the words contain only the vowel "o", while consonant selection remains free. This radically restricts word choice. It does not make word choice strictly serial in the sense of generative poetics, but rather allows the composition of a text under a variety of possibilities, which tells a particular story. The poem is composed of 41 words with o-assonance, but is only built out of 15 different root words that are continually repeated. There are only two acting characters: Otto and the pug. They are assigned verbs that appear in the first person singular indicative present tense, the only exception to this being the imperative "komm" [Eng: come] with which Otto calls his pug back, and which stands out because it is repeated.The only punctuation mark used is the colon, to introduce direct speech. By not using punctuation in his works, Jandl refers to Gertrude Stein's idea that commas get in the way of the reader's activity and autonomy when their only function is to make reading easier. Equally characteristic for Jandl is that the poem is written entirely in lowercase, which has a visual function in his poetry, where capital letters are reserved for special emphasis. In German, every noun is capitalized – in contrast to English, which only uses capitals for proper nouns – so this is even more striking.

Every line of the poem begins with the anaphor "otto", or the possessive (genitive) "ottos". Even in the title, the pug follows directly, in a combination that is repeated five times in the poem, and which underlines the close relationship between the two characters. The sentences are short, sometimes elliptical, and consist of two to a maximum of four words. In their simplicity they are reminiscent of the words of a young child. The individual words are monosyllabic, with the exception of "otto" and his comments "soso" and "ogottogott", which stand out because they are polysyllabic and because they are reduplicated. The pug is the grammatical subject of five sentences. The first and last stanzas of the poem show the pug's actions, which are commented on by Otto, who himself first becomes the agent in the middle of the stanza. Because of this, the first and last stanzas are syntactically analogous, but they contrast semantically: the growing distance between Otto and his pug in the first four lines is juxtaposed with the parallel return of the dog at the end. The line "ottos mops kotzt" rhymes with the first line "ottos mops trotzt", linking the beginning and the end of the poem and making the end the consequence of the beginning.

== Interpretation ==
Although ottos mops is frequently mentioned in poetry studies, there have been relatively few studies which focus exclusively on ottos mops.

=== Order and revolt ===
For the German scholar Andreas Brandtner, the title already shows the relationship between Otto and the pug: the possessive genitive assigns and subordinates the pug to Otto. In addition, the pug is only ever referred to by its breed, which, being a traditional domestic dog, further suggests that Otto is the pug's master. This situation is disrupted by the rebelliousness of the defiant pug, without any explanation of what exactly the pug is rebelling against. After Otto has sent the pug away, the conflict subsides for a while, while Otto is distracted by other activities. However, it is not long before he regrets sending the pug away. He calls to the pug, and his hope that it will return reveals their inner bond. Otto's listening tension is answered by the pug knocking in the third stanza. For a moment, it seems as though the conflict will be resolved, due to the pug's obedience. But the pug vomits, which breaks this accord and refers back to the pug's original defiance: in an instinctive act, the dog continues its attitude of defiance. Otto's rather indifferent or even threatening "soso" gives way to an appalled "ogottogott", an exclamation which contains the palindrome "otto".

Brandtner sees two levels at the core of the poem: the communication between human and animal, between master and hound, whose effectiveness is questioned; and the power relationship of the character constellation and its reference to real social-historic processes. According to Brandtner, this places ottos mops within the tradition of Jandl's other poetry, which, in the broadest sense, can always be understood as critical of society and language. At the same time, a democratic perspective is also inherent in ottos mops: the simple style encourages the reader to develop their own language games, and opens up participation in the production of poetry to the reader, in accordance with the avant-garde belief that art should play a role in everyday life.

=== Humor and poetry ===
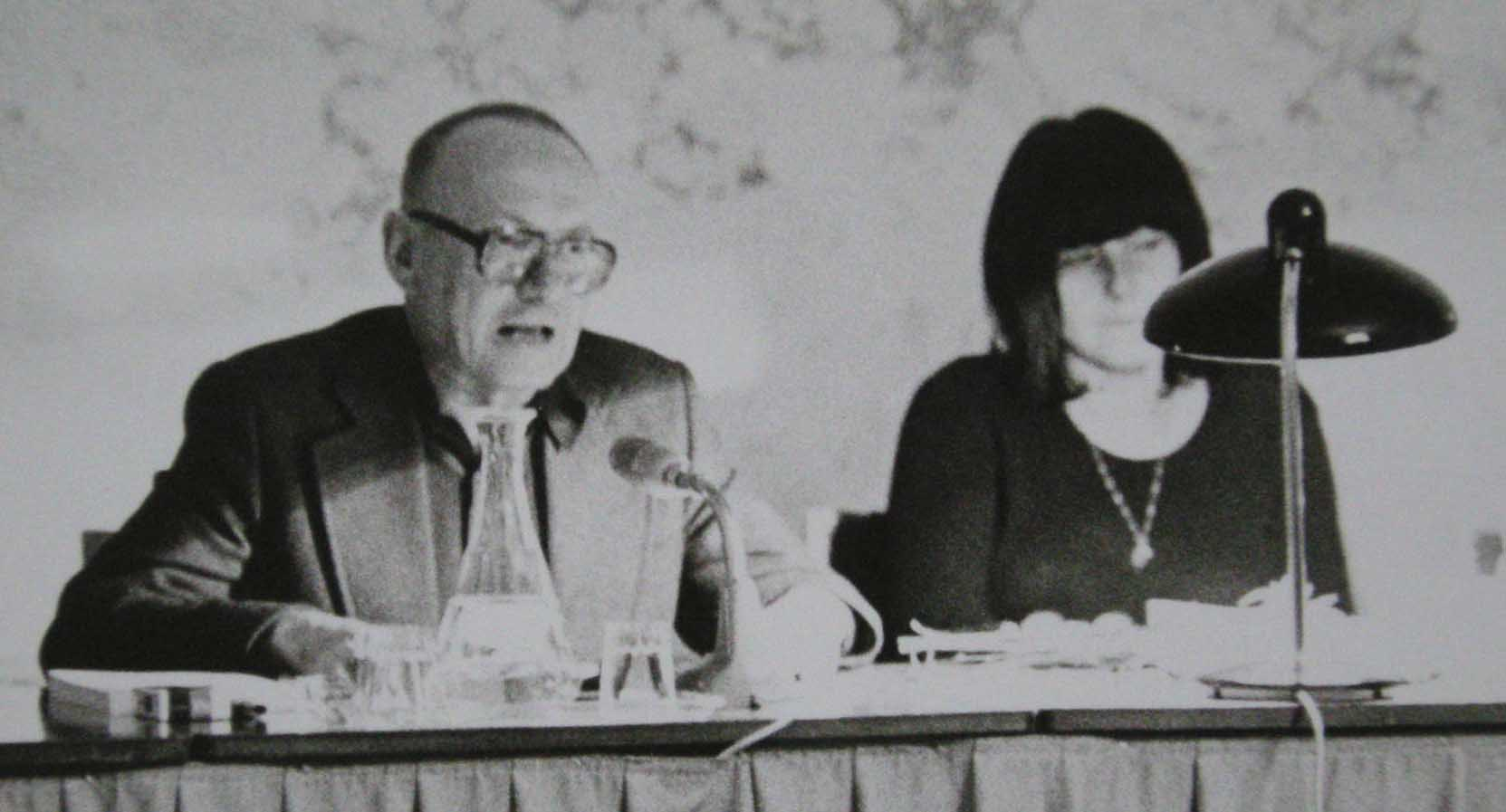
Friederike Mayröcker with Jandl at a reading, Vienna 1974

The German scholar Anne Uhrmacher, who wrote a dissertation on Jandl's poetry, feels that what differentiates ottos mops from the many adaptions that came as a consequence of its growing popularity is the form of humor that is different from the wit and irony of many attempts in the same style. She quotes Ludwig Reiners: "Wit laughs, humor smiles. Wit is ingenious, humor is affectionate. Wit sparkles, humor is radiant." In this sense, according to Uhrmacher, Jandl's humor, which is expressed in Otto's longing for the pug as well as in the comfort of the little world described, is far more than just witty word play.

Jandl himself differentiated the cheerful tone of poems such as ottos mops from the "grim" and "grotesque" humor of other texts. These, he argued, are poems "where people are right to laugh and where you don’t notice any controversial intentions."

Dieter Burdorf, another German scholar, sees a different form of humor in ottos mops. The poem reminds him of the slapstick humor of early silent films or of comic strips. Thus the comedy arises here not from the trivial content, but rather from the sound structure. The "o" sound is an exclamation of astonishment. The facial expression that the performer adopts, with rounded mouth for the "o", invites cabaret-like exaggeration in the opening and closing of the lips, and this itself was adopted by Jandl himself in the performance of the poem. Hans Mayer also discusses Jandl's elocution: "For children, Ernst Jandl’s concrete poetry was always immediately evident. [...] When Jandl himself recites it, children imitate him." Volker Hage feels that nobody could "shout out, whisper, celebrate, stutter, twist, chop up, spit out or caress their own lines" like Jandl. For him, ottos mops sounds as though it is structured like a nursery rhyme.

In her commentary on ottos mops, Jandl's life companion Friederike Mayröcker referred to "the author’s linguistic analysis of a vowel: he sings the high praises of O, of O-animal, of O-God, ohgodohgod, of the dog owner Otto, of the pug, who found his way back home, and we all laugh and cry". She sees the reader as being affected by a naive sympathy for both the owner of the pug and the pug itself: they are brought back to their early childhood experiences with animals. In the lines of the poem, a transition is accomplished "that succeeds afresh every time, namely from love of the vowel, to the reality of the image; from belief in the O for the revelation of poetry".

== Position in Jandl's works ==
Ottos mops was not Jandl's first attempt at writing poems which used only one vowel. In August 1963 he wrote das große e [Eng: the great e], a cycle of nine poems that are consistently based around the vowel "e", and in 1963/4 he penned a poem dominated by the vowel "a", mal franz mal anna (drama) [Eng: now franz, now anna (drama)]. Other poems by Jandl are built on the frequent use of a particular consonant, for example the poem etude in f, published in June 1956.

In the collection der künstliche baum, Jandl sorted his poems according to type, and in doing so differentiated between visual poems and sound poems. Ottos mops was placed in the section of "lese- und sprechgedichte" [Eng: read and spoken poetry]. In 1957, Jandl said the following of this form of poetry: "The sprechgedicht only becomes effective when it is read aloud. The length and intensity of the sounds are fixed in the way they are written. Tension arises through the sequences of short and long sounds [...], the hardening of the words through the lack of vowels [...], the dismantling of the word and the adding together of its elements to create new expressive groups of sound [...], varied repetition of words with the thematically justified addition of new words, up to the explosive ending."

In terms of subject matter, dogs play a big role in Jandl's poetry. Jörg Drews counted 42 poems that mention dogs, which makes up 3% of Jandl's total production.

== Reception ==
The poetry collection der künstliche baum [Eng: the artificial tree], in which ottos mops was first published, proved to be an immediate sales success. Initially 4,000 books were printed, which rose to 10,000 copies in a further two printings within the first year alone. In the mid-1970s, Jandl himself counted the volume as one of his three standard works. The poem ottos mops has also been published in collections of Jandl's poems and in anthologies. It has been incorporated into poetry books for children and young people, adapted into a picture book, published multiple times as an audio and music recording, and it is also the title of a German-language computer game, subtitled "In search of Jandl", which leads the player through Ernst Jandl's poetry. Ottos mops has often been performed by others as well as Jandl himself, such as Harry Rowohlt. In short, ottos mops became one of Jandl's most famous humorous poems. Robert Gernhardt called it "the second most popular poem of the German tongue [...] after Goethe’s Wanderer's Nightsong.

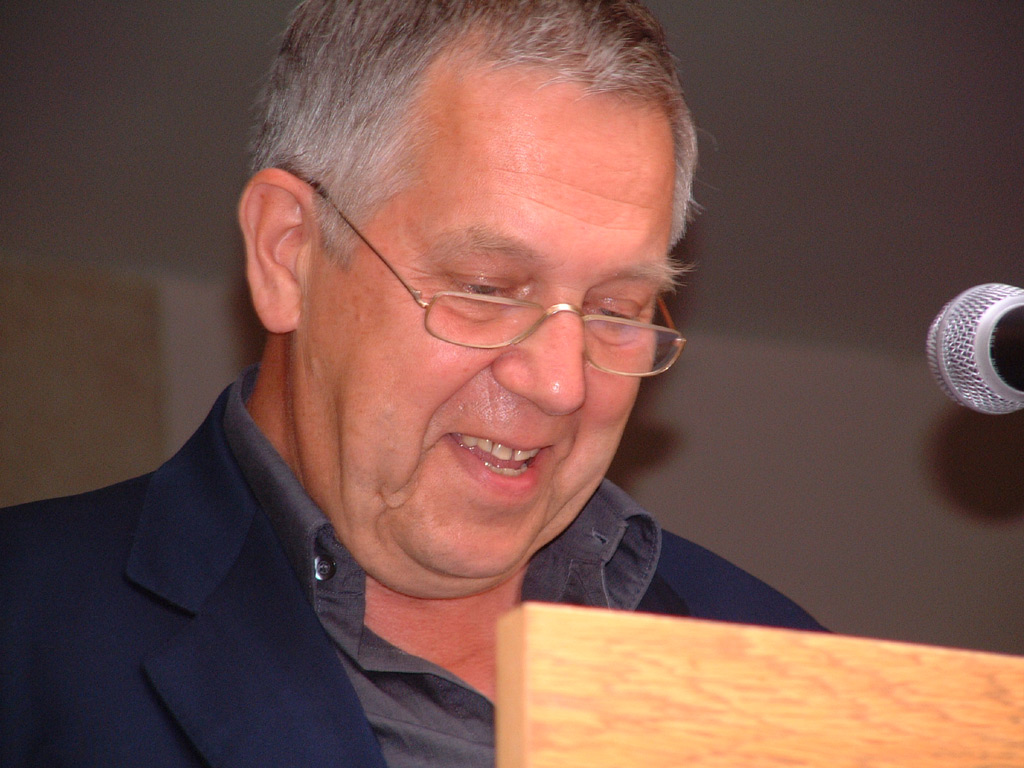
Robert Gernhardt at a reading, 2001

== Literature ==
=== Editions ===
- Ernst Jandl: der künstliche baum. Luchterhand, Neuwied 1970, p. 58.
- Ernst Jandl: ottos mops. In: Ernst Jandl: Poetische Werke. Band 4. Luchterhand, München 1997, ISBN 3-630-86923-8, p. 60.
- Ernst Jandl: ottos mops hopst. Ravensburger, Ravensburg 1988, ISBN 3-473-51673-2.
- Ernst Jandl, Norman Junge: ottos mops. Beltz, Weinheim 2001, ISBN 3-407-79807-5.
- Ernst Jandl: Ottos Mops hopst. Mit Farbradierungen von Erhard Dietl. Cbj, München 2008, ISBN 3-570-13390-7.

=== Secondary literature ===
- Andreas Brandtner: Von Spiel und Regel. Spuren der Machart in Ernst Jandls ottos mops. In: Volker Kaukoreit, Kristina Pfoser (Hrsg.): Interpretationen. Gedichte von Ernst Jandl. Reclam, Stuttgart 2002, ISBN 3-15-017519-4, p. 73–89.
- Anne Uhrmacher: Spielarten des Komischen. Ernst Jandl und die Sprache (= Germanistische Linguistik, Band 276). Niemeyer, Tübingen 2007, ISBN 978-3-484-31276-0, p. 138–146 (Dissertation Universität Trier 2005, 244 pages).
