= Kappacher =

Kappacher is a surname. Notable people with the surname include:

- Adam Kappacher (born 1993), Austrian freestyle skier
- Walter Kappacher (1938–2024), Austrian writer
