= Fritz Usinger =

German writer (1895–1982)

Fritz Usinger (5 March 1895 – 9 December 1982) was a German writer, poet, essayist, and translator. In 1946 he was awarded the Georg Büchner Prize by the German Academy for Language and Literature for his literary oeuvre.

== Awards ==
- Georg Büchner Prize 1946
