= Ernst Kreuder =

German author (1903–1972)

- Born: August 29, 1903 Zeitz, Germany
- Died: December 24, 1972 (aged 69) Darmstadt, Germany
- Occupation: Writer
- Language: German
- Notable works: The Attic Pretenders, Those Who Cannot Be Found, The Undiscoverables

Ernst Kreuder (29 August 1903 – 24 December 1972) was a German writer. He was born in Zeitz and died in Darmstadt.

== Work ==
His 1946 work The Attic Pretenders concerned a secret associations view of imagination and reality and was well received. Unica Zürn considered it to be one of her favorite books. He also wrote works like Those Who Cannot Be Found and The Undiscoverables. Although his works have been described as melancholy or Kafkaesque he stated that "the literary fashion of hopeless despair must be overcome."

== Bibliography ==
=== Novels ===
- Die Gesellschaft vom Dachboden (1946) - The Attic Pretenders, trans. Robert Kee (1948)
- Die Unauffindbaren (1948)
- Herein ohne anzuklopfen (1954)
- Agimos, oder Die Weltgehilfen (1959)
- Spur unterm Wasser (1963)
- Hörensagen (1969)
- Der Mann im Bahnwärterhaus (1973)

=== Stories ===
- Die Nacht des Gefangenen (1939)
- Das Haus mit den drei Bäumen (1944)
- Schwebender Weg/Die Geschichte durchs Fenster (1947)
- Tunnel zu vermieten (1966)
- Luigi und der grüne Seesack und andere Erzählungen (1980)
- Phantom der Angst: Erzählungen (1987)
- Erzählungen (2013)

=== Other ===
- Zur literarischen Situation der Gegenwart (1951)
- Georg Büchner: Existenz und Sprache (1955)
- Sommers Einsiedelei (1956), poetry
- Das Unbeantwortbare: Die Aufgaben des modernen Romans (1959)
- Zur Umweltsituation des Dichters (1961)
- Dichterischer Ausdruck und literarische Technik (1963)
- Die Gesellschaft vom Dachboden: Erzählungen, Essays, Selbstbetrachtungen (1990)

== Awards ==
- 1953 Georg Büchner Prize
