= Albert Drach =

Austrian-Jewish writer and lawyer (1902–1995)

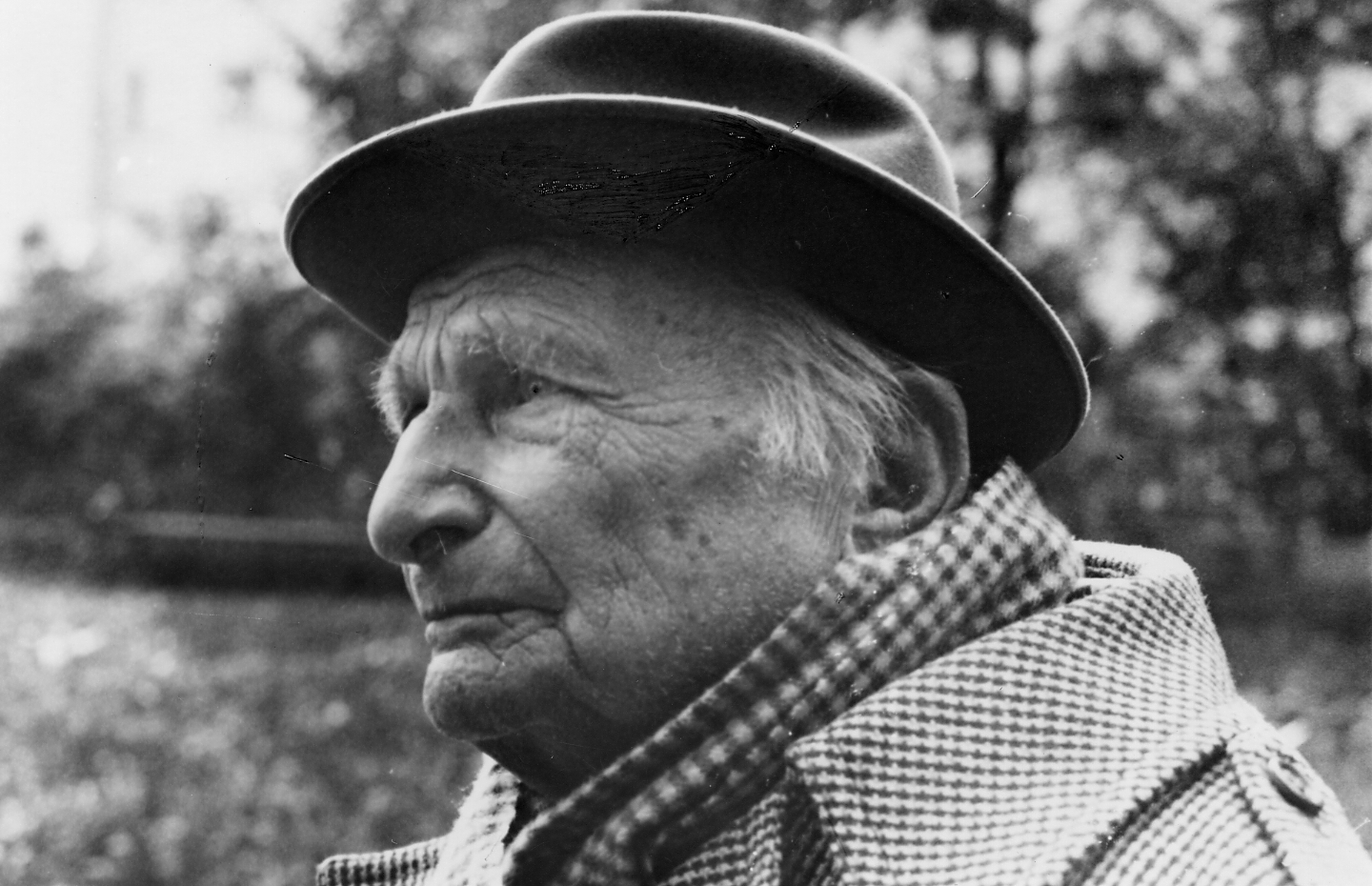
Albert Drach

Albert Drach (17 December 1902 – 27 March 1995) was an Austrian-Jewish writer and lawyer. He was born in Vienna and died in Mödling. In 1988 he was awarded the Georg Büchner Prize by the Deutsche Akademie für Sprache und Dichtung for being a "courageous and sensitive contemporary witness who expresses the madness of our century without resentment in poetic poignancy".

== Awards ==
- Georg Büchner Prize 1988
