= Dimitré Dinev =

Austrian writer

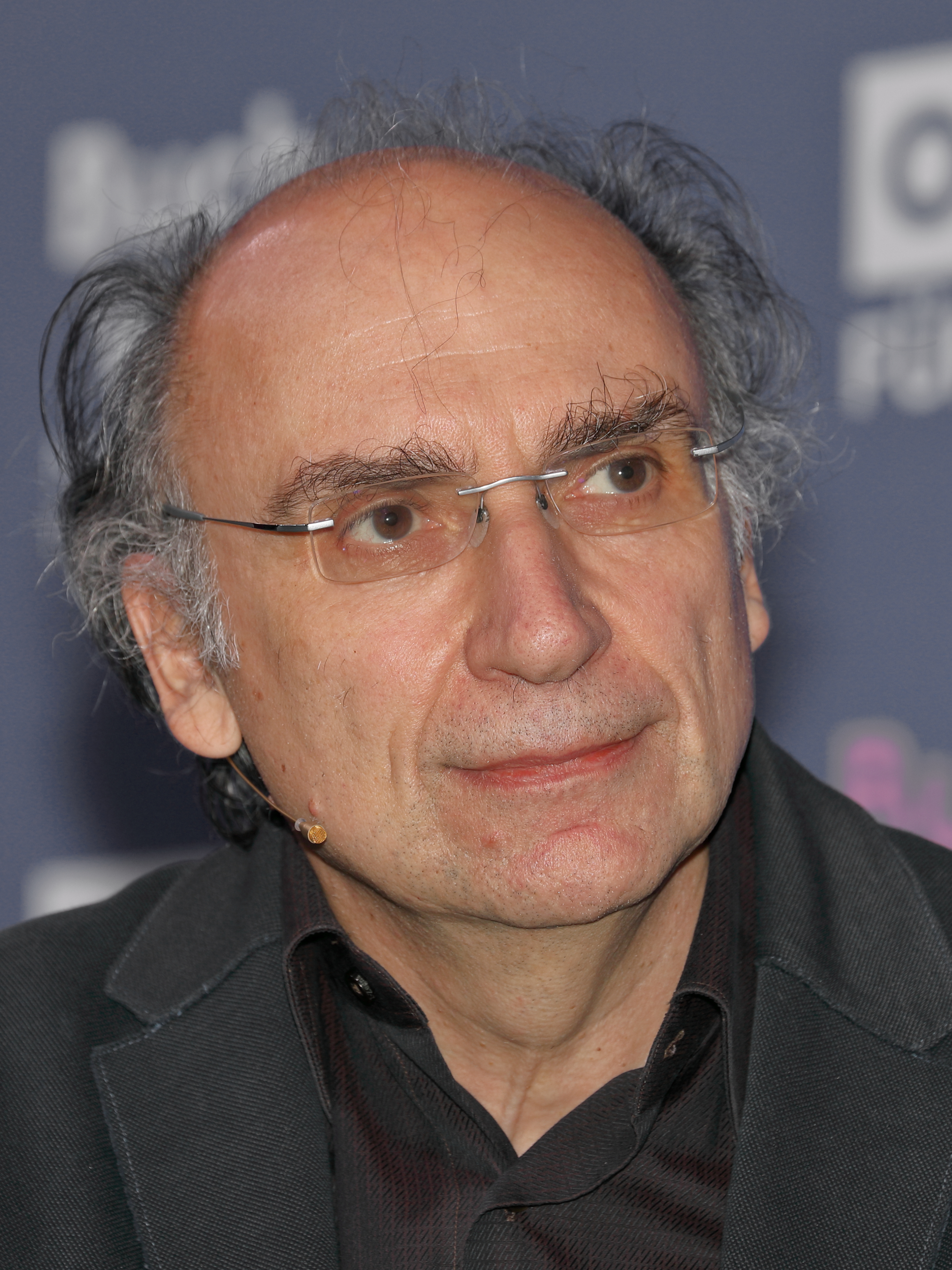
Dimitré Dinev at the Vienna Book Fair 2025

Dimitré Dinev (Bulgarian: Димитър Динев) (born 1968 in Plovdiv, Bulgaria) is a Bulgarian-born Austrian writer. He is best known for his play Kozha i nebe (Skin and sky), which controversially won the Askeer prize in 2007.

Although he was born in Plovdiv, Dinev grew up and spent his childhood in the city of Pazardzhik. He attended the Bertold Brecht school of German language until his graduation in 1987. It was here that he discovered and cultivated his love of writing and German literature.

Dinev left Bulgaria in 1990 due to the poor economic situation that arose in the country after the fall of the People's Republic of Bulgaria. At this time he migrated to Austria, where he began his new life in Traiskirchen; a city just south of Vienna that served as a registration point for many immigrants to the country. In Vienna, Dinev studied philosophy and Russian language, which he financed by doing part-time work.

Since 1991, Dinev has built his career as an author, poet and screenwriter, working almost exclusively in the German language; a departure from his previous works, which had been written in his native Bulgarian.

Dinev is also an outspoken advocate for immigrants and refugees in Austria. A popular theme with Dinev is the experience and plight of transnational migrants, which he expresses in his stories. These are often based on his own experience fleeing from poverty in his native land and adapting to life in a foreign country.

== Literary works ==
Dimitré's first publications were published in the Bulgarian, German and Russian languages in 1986. Since 1992 German-language screenplays, translations, plays and prose have been regularly published. Most of his literary works are short stories, some of which are published in books like "Ein Licht über dem Kopf" (A Light Over the Head) and some in newspapers or magazines. After various short stories and essays (for example "Barmherzigkeit", a collection of four essays about the German term Barmherzigkeit ("mercy"), he had his international literary breakthrough with the publication of the Familienroman "Engelszungen" (Angel's Tongues), first published by Franz Deuticke in 2003.

"Engelszungen" tells the story of two Bulgarian families throughout most of the 20th Century, the Mladenovs and the Apostolovs. Both families are (mostly) from a little town in Bulgaria and while the various family members try to live their lives, their stories cover much the same ground over three generations, with almost no moments of face-to-face encounters, maybe two in the entire book; for example when Iskren and Svetljo bump into each other at the central cemetery in Vienna after escaping from Bulgaria, where the "Engel der Flüchtlinge" (angel of refugees) is waiting for them…

The novel was critically acclaimed. Works by Dimitré Dinev have now been translated into fifteen languages and his films have been very successful. In 2011, his screenplay "Spanien" (Spain) was adapted as a motion picture directed by Anja Salomonowitz starring Tatjana Alexander, Gregoire Colin, Lukas Miko and Cornelius Obanya. It was released in Austria on 23 March 2012 after being the opening movie at the Berlin International Film Festival 2012 .

Dinev has received numerous awards and literary prizes.

=== Themes and style ===
Against the background of his own past, Dinev writes about people who suffer under communism and capitalism (Bulgaria), about those who try to escape, those who live on the margins of society, those who sail close to the wind: refugees, emigrants, immigrants, unemployed and homeless people, those who just want to live their dream one day: "to live (Austria), love and to be loved by others" ("Spas sleeps", in: Vienna tales, first edition. Contributors: Constantine, Helen; Holmes, Deborah. 2014)

Dinev's stories are filled with grief, sadness, distress and pain but never without his particular sense of humour and hope.

According to an article in the German newspaper Die Welt, he has a special talent for connecting the most different emotions and life stories. He writes with a dry but hilarious tone. "He is probably the most important and funny ambassador of Bulgarian humour that exists at present".

His sense of humour extends into the microstructure of his texts, often to the names of his characters like Spas (engl.: fun) Christov in the short story "Spas sleeps", whose only German word is "Arbeit" (engl.: work). Spas searches for work in Vienna, not for love or hope. Work is the dream and the reality for immigrants like him.

=== Theater productions ===
- 1999 (première), "Russenhuhn", WUK, Vienna
- 2006 (première), "Haut und Himmel", Rabenhof, Vienna
- 2007 (première), "Das Haus des Richters", Akademietheater, Vienna
- 2008 (première), "Eine heikle Sache, die Seele" (comedy), Volkstheater, Vienna
- 2010 (première), "Die Ratten von Gerhart Hauptmann" - adapted for the Volkstheater by Dimitré Dinev, Vienna
- 2014 (première), "Topalovic & Söhne" (Balkan operetta, composer: Nebojsa Krulanovic), Theater an der Rott, Eggenfelden
- 2015 (première), "Alice im Wunderland" (new version), Sommerspiele Melk
- 2015 (première), "Whatever works" (satirical musical theatre), Vienna

=== Film production ===
- 2011, "Spanien", directed by Anja Salomonowitz, world premiere at the Berlin International Film Festival 2012.

=== Novels ===
- "Die Inschrift" (narratives), Edition Exil, Vienna 2001.
- "Engelszungen" (novel), Deuticke Verlag, Vienna 2003, (Lizenzausgaben und btb-Taschenbuch 2006; Bulgarian translation 2006, Macedonian translation 2007, Turkish translation 2008, Swedish translation 2011)
- "Ein Licht über dem Kopf" (narratives), Deuticke Verlag, Wien 2005. (Lizenzausgabe "Innsbruck liest" 2006; btb-Taschenbuch 2007; Rumanian translation; Norwegian translation).
- "Barmherzigkeit (Essays, Burgtheaterrede)", Residenzverlag, St. Pölten 2010.

=== Short Novels ===
- "Boshidar", in: "fremdland", Edition Exil, Vienna 2000.
- "Ein Licht über dem Kopf, Hallo Taxi", Andiamo Verlag, Mannheim 2001.
- "Wechselbäder", in: "Lichtungen", Akademie Graz 2002 + Wiener "Volltext" and the German newspaper Süddeutsche Zeitung Nr.223, September 2004.
- "Das Kind mit dem Schirm" (literary protocol), in: "Tandem", Mandelbaum Verlag 2006.
- "Der Regen, Der andere nebenan: Eine Anthologie aus dem Südosten Europas", ed. Richard Swartz, S. Fischer Verlag, Frankfurt am Main 2007.
- "Das Geburtstagskind", in: "Lichterfeste, Schattenspiele", ed. Péter Esterházy, DTV 2009.
- "Ion, grenzenlos. ein literarisch engagiertes europabrevier", ed. Klaus Servene, Andiamo Verlag, Mannheim 2011.
- "Spas sleeps, Vienna Tales", ed. Helen Constantine, translated into English by Deborah Holmes, Oxford University Press 2014.

=== Third-Party Published Works ===
- "Grenzen.überschreiten.ein europa-lesebuch (Kurzgeschichten)"; with the City of Mannheim, Klaus Servene and Sudabeh Mohafez), Andiamo Verlag, Mannheim 2008.
- "Zirkus Bulgarien: Geschichten für eine Zigarettenlänge" by Deyan Enev (translated from the Bulgarian by Katrin Zemmrich and Norbert Randow; selected and with an afterword by Dimitré Dinev), Deuticke Verlag, Wien 2008.

== Awards ==
- 1992: Große Drehbuchförderung des ÖFF (Austrian film award)
- 1999: Arbeits-Stipendium der Kunstsektion des Bundeskanzleramt
- 2000: Literary Award "Schreiben zwischen den Kulturen" of the edition-exil, Vienna
- 2001: 1st prize for the literature competition Andiamo Verlag und Kulturamt Mannheim
- 2002: Literary award der Akademie Graz, 1st prize
- 2002: Mannheimer Literaturpreis
- 2003: Förderungspreis der Stadt Wien
- 2004: Invited to the "Bundesstiftung" Stipendiat in Wiepersdorf Castle
- 2004: Förderpreis des Kulturkreises der deutschen Wirtschaft
- 2004: Buch Preis der Arbeiterkammer Oberösterreich for Engelszungen
- 2005 :Adelbert-von-Chamisso-Förderpreis der Robert Bosch Stiftung
- 2007: Askeer (Bulgarian "Theater Oscars") for "Haut und Himmel"
- 2008: With Orhan Pamuk "Dichter zu Gast" at the Salzburger Festspielen
- 2011/12: Writer in Residence of the one world foundation in Sri Lanka
- 2012: George Saiko –Travel Scholarship
- 2013: Elias Canetti-Stipendium der Stadt Wien
- 2014: Dimitré Dinev awarded the Robert Musil Stipendium
- 2016: Max Kade Writer-in-Residence at Lafayette College, USA
- 2025: Austrian Book Prize

== Literature about Dinev ==
- "Dimitré Dinev", in: "Internationales Biographisches Archiv 46/2008", 11 November 2008, in the Munzinger-Archiv (the beginning of the article is freely accessible).
- "Ankommen: Gespräche mit Dimitré Dinev, Anna Kim, Radek Knapp, Julyia Rabinowich und Michael Stavaric", bound edition 24 September 2014 by Brigitte Schwens-Harrant.
- Raluca Rădulescu: "Die Fremde als Ort der Begegnung. Untersuchungen zu deutschsprachigen südosteuropäischen Autoren mit Migrationshintergrund". Konstanz: Hartung-Gorre 2013.
- Raluca Rădulescu: "Lazarus darf nicht herauskommen. Dimitré Dinevs unheile Welt im Erzählungsband „Ein Licht über dem Kopf“". In: Zeitschrift der Germanisten Rumäniens, București, 1-2 (39-40)/ 2011, pp. 219–232.
- Raluca Rădulescu: "„Wir sind alle nur Gäste auf dieser Erde”. Fremdheit und Vertrautheit in Dimitré Dinevs Werk". In: "Wechselwirkungen II. Deutschsprachige Literatur und Kultur im regionalen und internationalen Kontext. Pécser Studien zur Germanistik Band 6". Ed. Zoltán Szendi, Praesens, Wien, 2012, pp. 107–117.
- Joanna Drynda, ed., "Zwischen Aufbegehren und Anpassung: Poetische Figurationen von Generationen und Generationserfahrungen in der österreichischen Literatur. Posener Beiträge zur Germanistik 32". Frankfurt: Peter Lang, 2012. Journal of Austrian Studies [2165-669X], Guenther, 2014, vol. 47, Issue 3, p. 128.
- Dobreva, Boryana Y., University of Pittsburgh, ProQuest Dissertations Publishing, 2011. 3485633: "Subjectivity regained? German-language writing from Eastern Europe and the Balkans through an east–west gaze."
- Paul F. Dvorak, "Modern Austrian Prose Vol. II: Interpretations and Insights", Journal of Austrian studies [2165-669X], Muston, 2014, vol. 47, Issue 3, p. 134.
- "Migration als steter Fluss der Globalisierung: konferenzansprache, Jahrestagung der Austrian Studies Association", California State University Long Beach, April 2012, Journal of Austrian studies [2165-669X], 2014, vol. 47, Issue 4, p. 1.
- "Von Osterreichern, Europaern, und Menschen", Journal of Austrian studies [2165-669X], 2014, vol. 47, Issue 4, p. 15.
- "East-Central European Literatures Twenty Years After East European Politics & Societies", Journal of Austrian studies [0888-3254], Heim, 2009, vol. 23, Issue 4, pp. 552–581.
