= Wilhelm Michel =

German author

Wilhelm Michel (9 August 1877, Metz – 16 April 1942, Darmstadt) was a German writer who won the 1925 Georg Büchner Prize.

== Bibliography ==
- Apollon und Dionysos. Dualistische Streifzüge 1904
- Rainer Maria Rilke 1905
- Der Zuschauer. Gedichte 1907
- Das Teuflische und Groteske in der Kunst 1911
- Friedrich Hölderlin 1912
- Der Mensch versagt 1920
- Hölderlins abendländische Wendung 1923
- Hölderlin und der deutsche Geist 1924
- Das Leiden am Ich 1930
- Das Leben Friedrich Hölderlins 1940
