= Friederike Mayröcker =

Austrian writer (1924–2021)

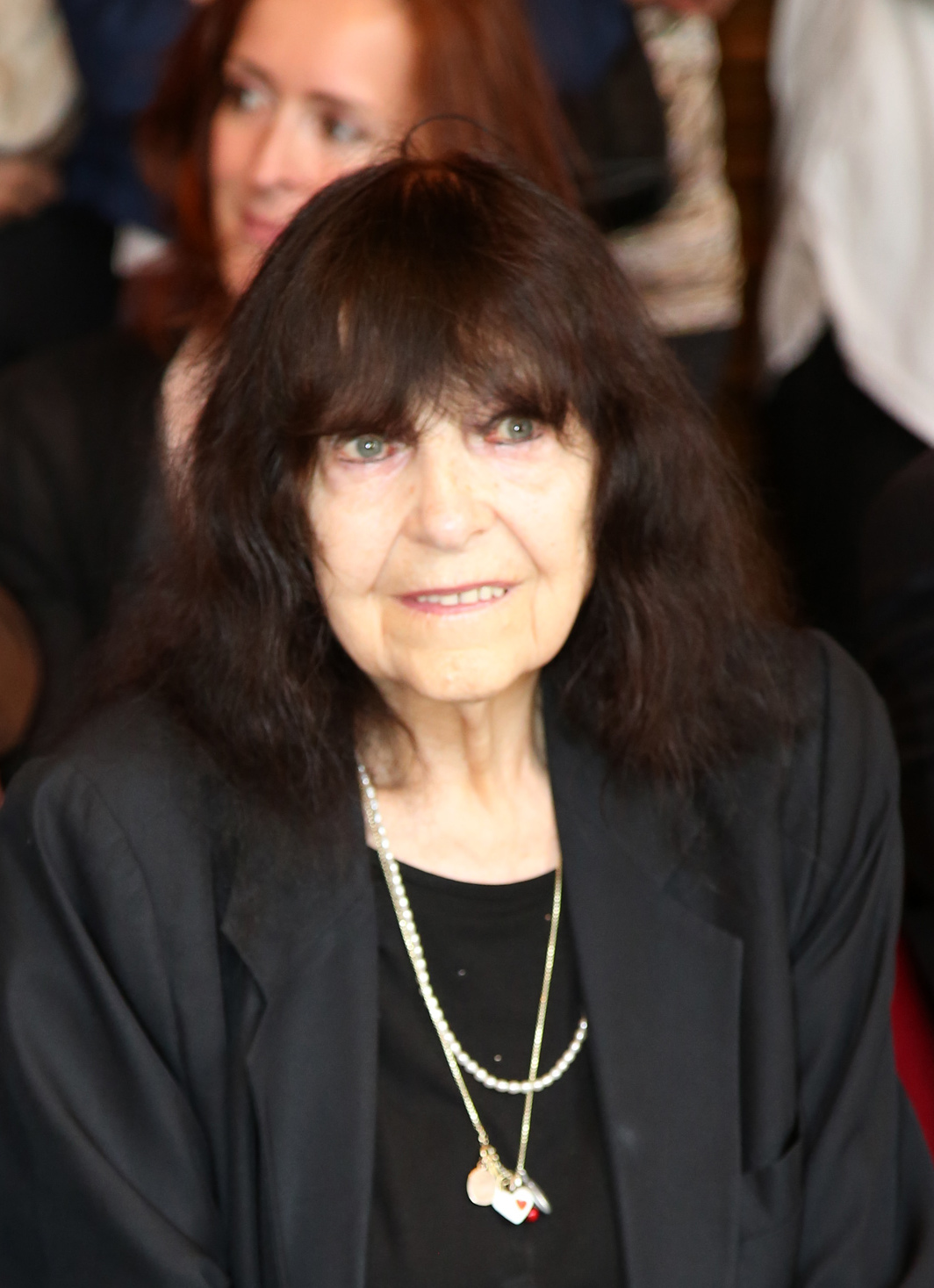
- Mayröcker in 2015
- Born: 20 December 1924; Vienna, Austria
- Died: 4 June 2021 (aged 96); Vienna, Austria
- Occupations: Teacher; Poet
- Organizations: Wiener Gruppe
- Partner: Ernst Jandl
- Awards: Theodor Körner Prize; Hörspielpreis der Kriegsblinden; Grand Austrian State Prize; Grand Literature Prize of the Bavarian Academy of Fine Arts; America Award; Georg Büchner Prize

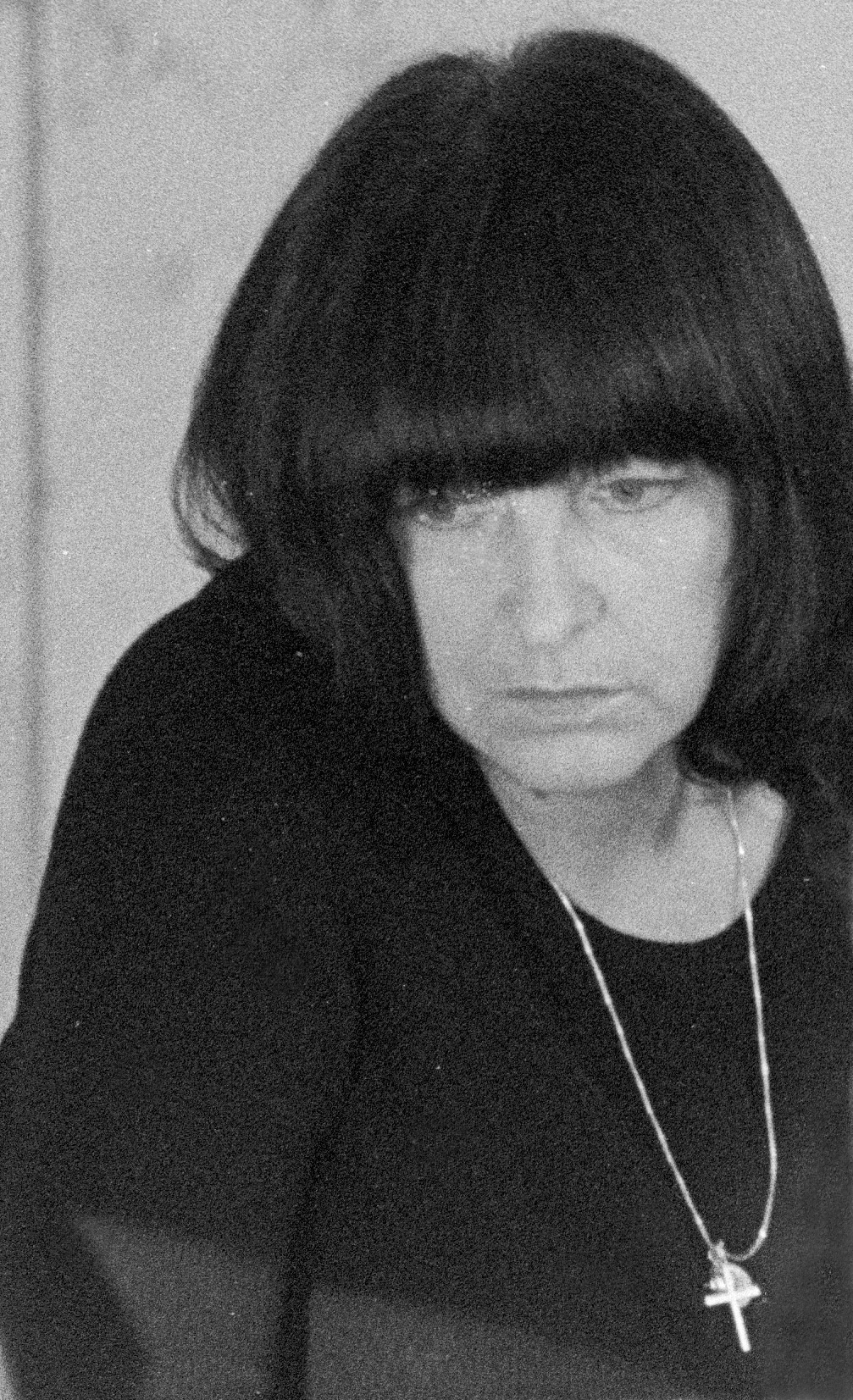
At the 1974 Vienna Buchwoche

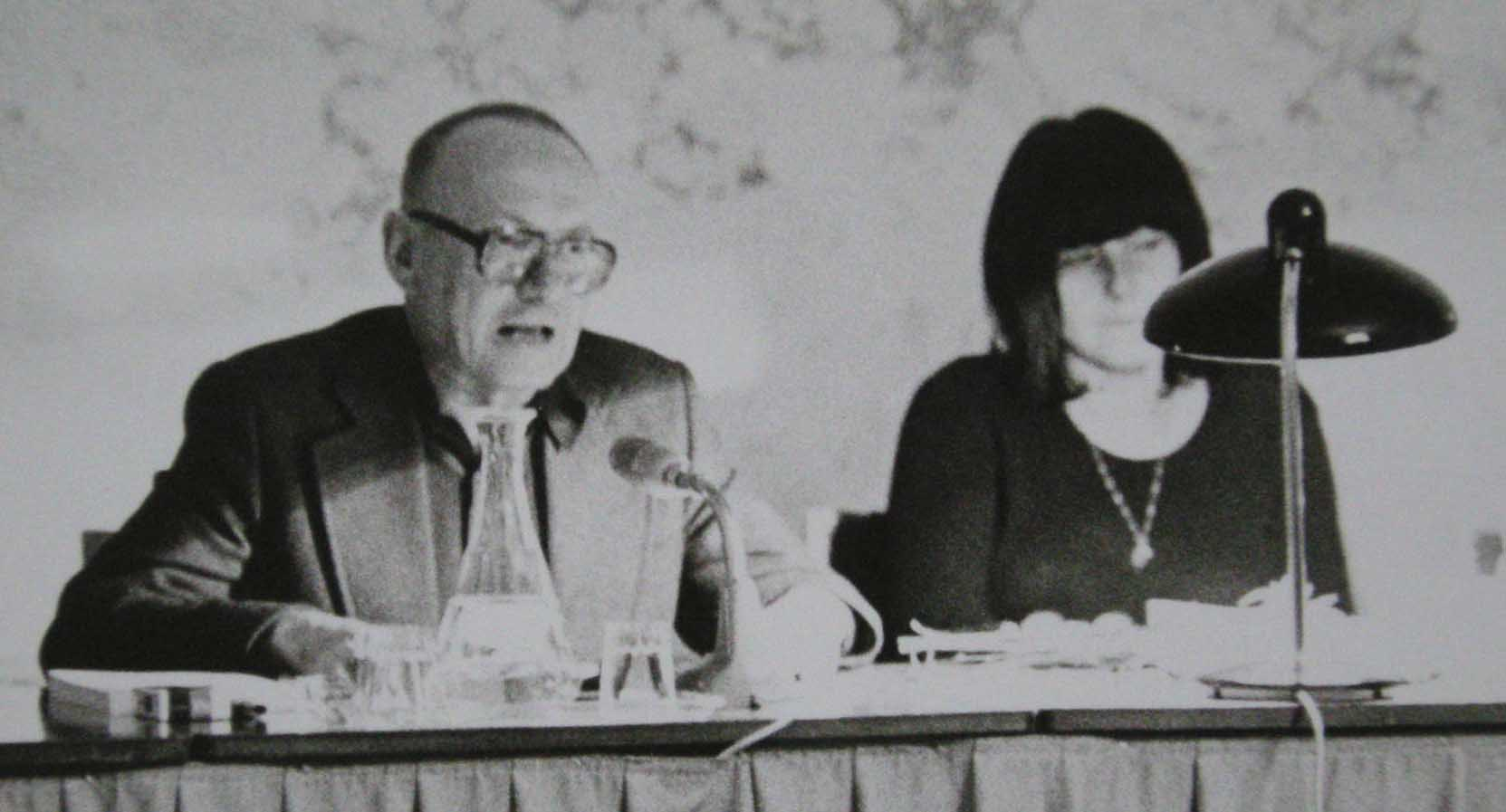
Ernst Jandl and Mayröcker, at a public reading in Vienna, 1974

Friederike Mayröcker (20 December 1924 – 4 June 2021) was an Austrian writer of poetry and prose, radio plays, children's books and dramatic texts. She experimented with language and was regarded as an avant-garde poet and as one of the leading authors in German. Her work, inspired by art, music, literature and everyday life, appeared as "novel and also dense text formations, often described as 'magical'." According to The New York Times, her work was "formally inventive, much of it exploiting the imaginative potential of language to capture the minutiae of daily life, the natural world, love and grief."

== Life ==
Mayröcker was born in Vienna, the daughter of a teacher and a milliner. Until age 11, she spent the summers regularly in the village Deinzendorf. In World War II, she was drafted as an air force aide, working as a secretary. From 1946 to 1969 Mayröcker was an English teacher at several public schools in Vienna.

She started writing poetry at age 15. In 1946, she met Otto Basil who published some of her first works in his avant-garde journal Plan. Mayröcker's poems were published a few years later by renowned literary critic Hans Weigel. She was eventually introduced to the Wiener Gruppe, a group of mostly surrealist and expressionist Austrian authors such as Ingeborg Bachmann. Her first book, a collection of prose miniatures, Larifari – Ein konfuses Buch (Airy-fairy. A confused book), appeared in 1956. It remained the only book for ten years, but then the poem collection Death by Muses, meant her breakthrough and recognition as "a leading lyrical voice of her generation". Many more collections followed, published from 1979 by Suhrkamp.

Mayröcker is recognized as one of the most important contemporary Austrian poets. She also had success with her prose and radio plays. Four of them she wrote together with Ernst Jandl, her partner from 1954 until his death in 2000. While they shared a love of writing, they did not share a house or have any children. She once reflected in a poem that they stood together in the kitchen with poems in their heads, "but not the same one". Even so, after Jandl's death, she was so stricken with grief that she was initially unable to write. She eventually addressed this grief in her work, Requiem for Ernst Jandl, and resumed writing well into her nineties. Her prose is often described as autofictional, since Mayröcker uses quotes of private conversations and excerpts from letters and diaries in her work. She described her working process: "I live in pictures. I see everything in pictures, my complete past, memories are pictures. I transform pictures into language by climbing into the picture. I walk into it until it becomes language."

She sometimes included her drawings in books, and exhibited her art. She was also inspired by music, and literature of Samuel Beckett and Friedrich Hölderlin, among many others. Her montages are also fed from everyday life observations, correspondence and newspapers. She produced "novel and also dense text formations, often described as "magical".

Mayröcker earned numerous German-language literary prizes and was frequently mentioned as a potential Nobel laureate.

A German-produced documentary chronicling Mayröcker's life and work was released in 2008. Her last lyric collection, da ich morgens und moosgrün. Ans Fenster trete (as mornings and mossgreen I. Step to the window), was short-listed for the prize of the Leipzig Book Fair 2021, with the jury saying that she "fuses poetry and prose into 'proems' full of infatuations, futilities, fantasies, daydreams".

She saw life, "like a surprise - you never know how it ends, it's an adventure that you create yourself".

Mayröcker died on 4 June 2021, in Vienna, aged 96.

== Awards ==
- 1963: Theodor Körner Prize
- 1969: Hörspielpreis der Kriegsblinden for Fünf Mann Menschen (with Ernst Jandl)
- 1975: Austrian Prize for Literature
- 1976: Prize for Literature of Vienna
- 1977: Georg Trakl Prize for Poetry
- 1981: Anton Wildgans Prize
- 1982: Grand Austrian State Prize for Literature
- 1982: Roswitha Prize
- 1985: Literature Prize of Southwest Radio Baden-Baden
- 1985: Gold Medal of Vienna
- 1987: Austrian Decoration for Science and Art
- 1989: Hans-Erich-Nossack-Preis
- 1993: Friedrich-Hölderlin-Preis of Bad Homburg
- 1994: Manuscripts Award
- 1996: Else Lasker-Schüler Poetry Prize
- 1996: Grand Literature Prize of the Bavarian Academy of Fine Arts
- 1997: America Award
- 1997: Droste-Preis (Meersburg)
- 2000: Christian-Wagner-Preis
- 2001: Karl Sczuka Prize for the radio play The envelope of the birds
- 2001: Georg Büchner Prize
- 2001: Honorary doctorate, Bielefeld University
- 2003: Premio Internazionale
- 2004: Honorary Ring of the Vienna
- 2009: Hermann-Lenz-Preis for poem Scardanelli
- 2010: Peter Huchel Prize for This jacket (namely) the griffin
- 2010: Horst-Bienek-Preis für Lyrik of the Bavarian Academy of Fine Arts
- 2011: Bremen Literature Prize for ich bin in der Anstalt. Fusznoten zu einem nichtgeschriebenen Werk
- 2016: Austrian Book Prize
- 2017: Günter Eich Prize
- 2017: Hörbuch des Jahres

== Works ==
- Gesammelte Prosa 1949–2001 (Collected Prose 1949–2001) ed. by Klaus Reichert, 5 volumes, Frankfurt/Main 2001 ISBN 9783518412992
- Magische Blätter I-V (Magic Pages I–V), Frankfurt/Main 2001 ISBN 9783518413012
- Requiem für Ernst Jandl (Requiem for Ernst Jandl), Frankfurt/Main 2001 ISBN 9783518412169
- Mein Arbeitstirol – Gedichte 1996–2001 (My Working Tyrol – Poems 1996–2001), Frankfurt/Main 2003 ISBN 9783518413937
- Die kommunizierenden Gefäße (The Communicating Vessels) Frankfurt/Main 2003 ISBN 9783518124444
- Sinclair Sofokles der Baby-Saurier (Sinclair Sofokles the Baby Dinosaur) with coloured illustrations by Angelika Kaufmann, St. Pölten 2004 ISBN 9783853262870
- Gesammelte Gedichte 1939–2003 (Collected Poems) ed. by Marcel Beyer, Frankfurt/Main 2005 ISBN 9783518416310
- Und ich schüttelte einen Liebling (And I Shook a Darling), Frankfurt/Main 2005 ISBN 9783518417096
- fleurs, Suhrkamp, Berlin 2016, ISBN 9783518425206
- Pathos und Schwalbe, Suhrkamp, Berlin 2018, ISBN 9783518225042

=== Audio plays ===
Audio plays by Mayröcker, some written jointly with Jandl, include:

- Die Umarmung, nach Picasso (The Embrace, After Picasso)
- Repetitionen, nach Max Ernst (Repetitions, After Max Ernst)
- Schubertnotizen oder das unbestechliche Muster der Ekstase (Schubert-Notes or the Incorrupt Model of Ecstasy)
- Arie auf tönernen Füßen (Aria on Feet of Clay)
- Das zu Sehende, das zu Hörende (The to Be Seen, the to Be Heard)
- Die Kantate oder, Gottes Augenstern bist Du (The Cantata or, Gods Eye-star You Are), music by Wolfgang von Schweinitz (2003)

with Ernst Jandl:

- Der Gigant (The Giant)
- Gemeinsame Kindheit (Childhood Together)
- Fünf Mann Menschen, translated as Five Man Humanity
- Spaltungen (Partitions)

=== Libretto ===
- Stretta, music by Wolfram Wagner. World premiere at Sirene Opera, Vienna 2004

=== Translations ===
Several of Mayröcker’s collections have been translated into English, including Night Train (1992, trans. Beth Bjorklund); Heiligenanstalt (1994, trans. Rosmarie Waldrop); with each clouded peak (1998, trans. Rosmarie Waldrop and Harriett Watts); peck me up, my wing (2000, trans. Mary Burns); Raving Language: Selected Poems 1946–2006 (2007, trans. Richard Dove); and brütt, or The Sighing Gardens (2008, trans. Roslyn Theobald).

== See also ==
- List of Austrian writers
