= Hermann-Lenz-Preis =

German literary award

- Description: Award for German-language poetry and literature
- Country: Germany
- Presented by: Hubert Burda (Hubert Burda Stiftung)
- Reward: €15,000
- Website: www.petrarca-preis.de/hermann-lenz-preis

Hermann-Lenz-Preis was a literary prize of Germany from 1999 to 2009. The award for German-language poetry is named after the writer Hermann Lenz, who died 1998. The prize money was €15.000 donated by publisher Hubert Burda. Successor is the Petrarca-Preis for European writers. In 2008, the jury consisted of Michael Krüger, Peter Hamm, Peter Handke and Alfred Kolleritsch.

== Recipients ==
- 1999: Josef W. Janker
- 2000: Johannes Kühn
- 2001: Ralf Rothmann
- 2002: Erich Wolfgang Skwara
- 2003: Joseph Zoderer
- 2004: Walter Kappacher
- 2005: Franz Weinzettl
- 2006: Jürgen Becker
- 2007: Angela Krauß
- 2008: Xaver Bayer
- 2009: Friederike Mayröcker
