= Georg Büchner Prize =

German literary award

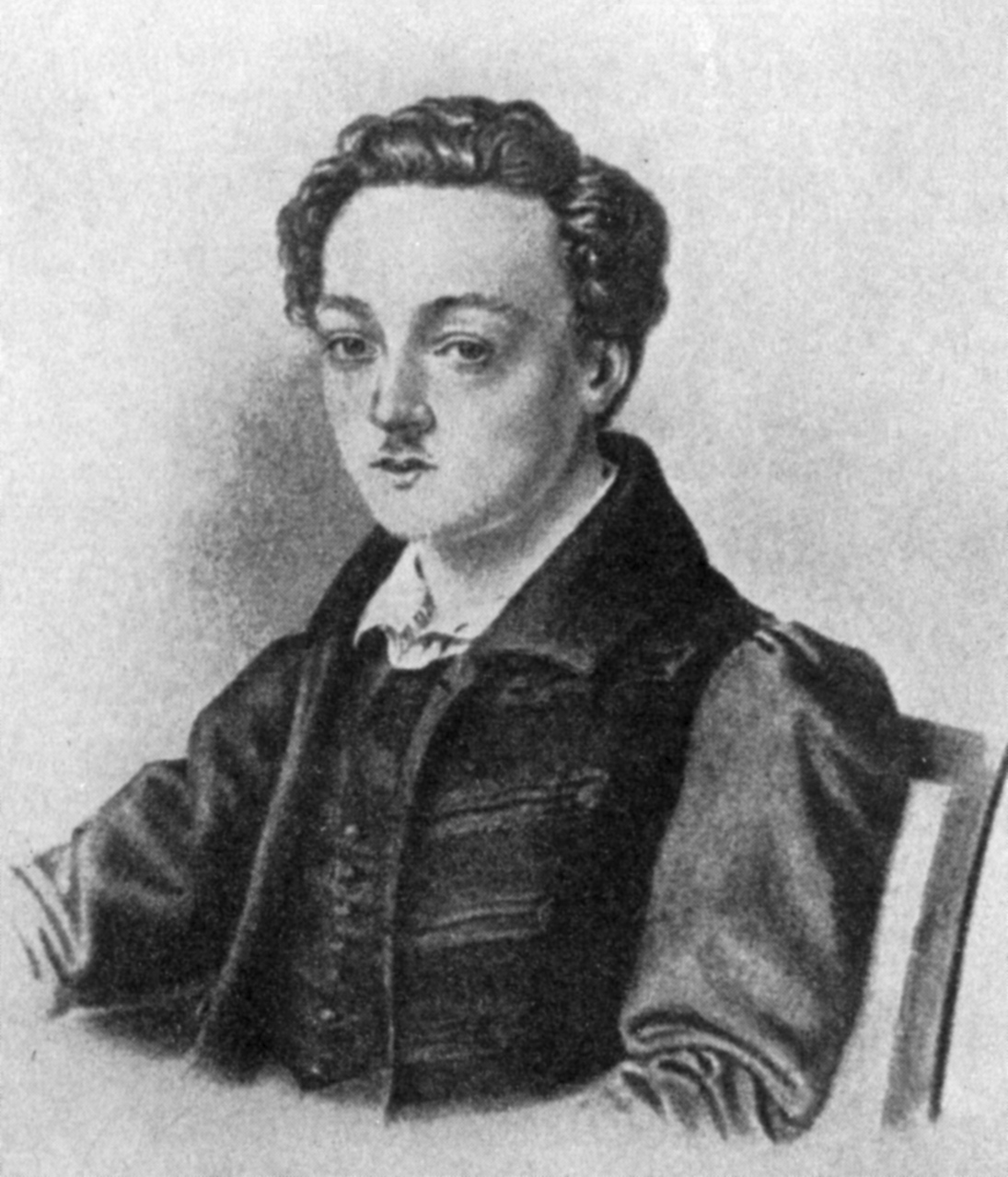
- Portrait of Georg Büchner, pencil drawing by the Darmstadt theater painter Philipp August Joseph Hoffmann
- Awarded for: authors writing in the German language whose work is considered especially meritorious and who have made a significant contribution to contemporary German culture
- Location: Darmstadt
- Country: Germany
- Presented by: Deutsche Akademie für Sprache und Dichtung
- Reward: €50,000
- First award: 1923
- Website: www.deutscheakademie.de/en/awards/georg-buechner-preis

The Georg Büchner Prize (German: Georg-Büchner-Preis) is the most important literary prize for German language literature. The award is named after dramatist and writer Georg Büchner, author of Woyzeck and Leonce and Lena. The Georg Büchner Prize is awarded annually for authors "writing in the German language who have notably emerged through their oeuvre as essential contributors to the shaping of contemporary German cultural life".

== History ==
The Georg Büchner Prize was created in 1923 in memory of Georg Büchner and was only given to artists who came from or were closely tied to Büchner's home of Hesse. It was first awarded in 1923. Among the early recipients were mostly visual artists, poets, actors, and singers.

In 1951, the prize changed to a general literary prize, awarded annually by the Deutsche Akademie für Sprache und Dichtung. It goes to German language authors, and the annual speech by the recipient takes place in Darmstadt. Since 2002, the prize has been endowed with €50,000.

== The Georg Büchner Prize and the Nobel Prize in Literature ==
Five winners of the Georg Büchner Prize, Günter Grass (1965), Heinrich Böll (1967), Elias Canetti (1972), Peter Handke (1973) and Elfriede Jelinek (1998) have been awarded the Nobel Prize in Literature in subsequent years. The Georg Büchner Prize is frequently seen as an indicator for potential future Nobel Prize winners writing in the German language. Most recently, however, the Swedish Academy in Stockholm preceded the German Academy for Language and Literature in awarding a prolific writer from the German sprachraum. Herta Müller received the Nobel Prize in Literature but has not yet been awarded the Georg Büchner Prize.

== Recipients of the literary prize, since 1951 ==
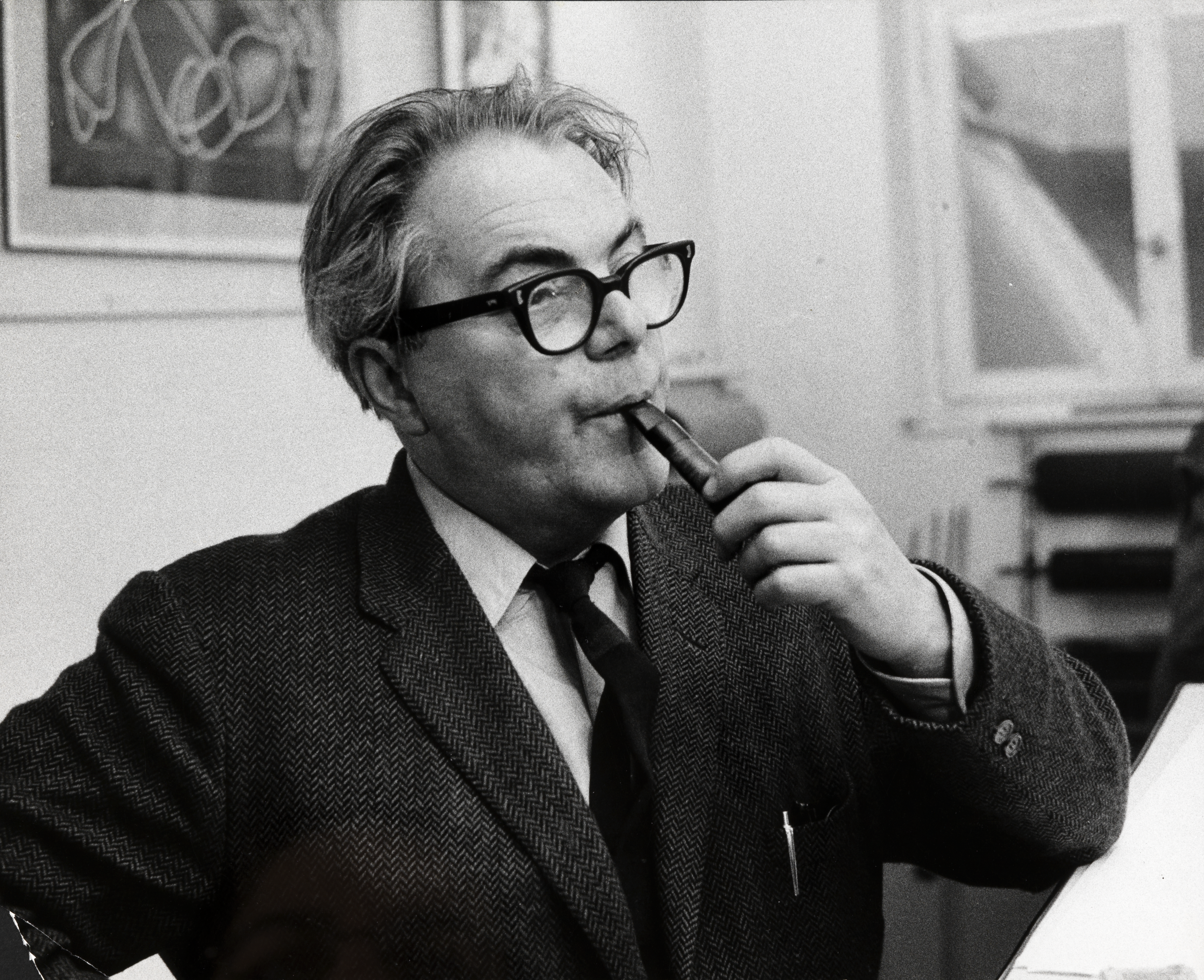
Max Frisch

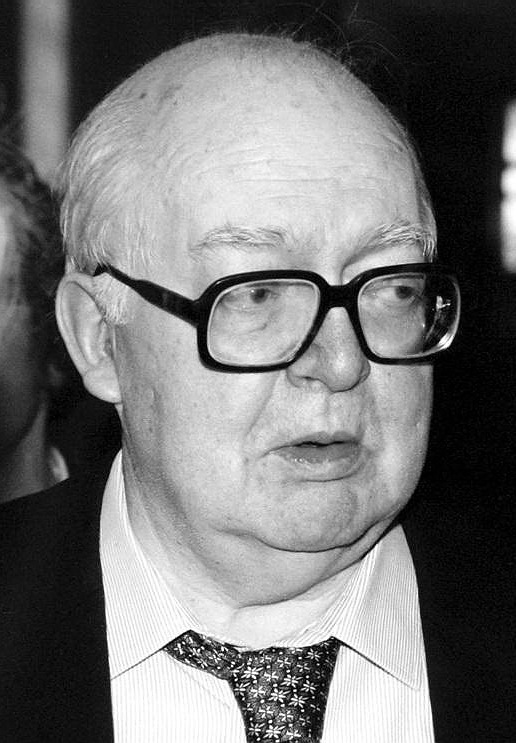
Friedrich Dürrenmatt in 1989

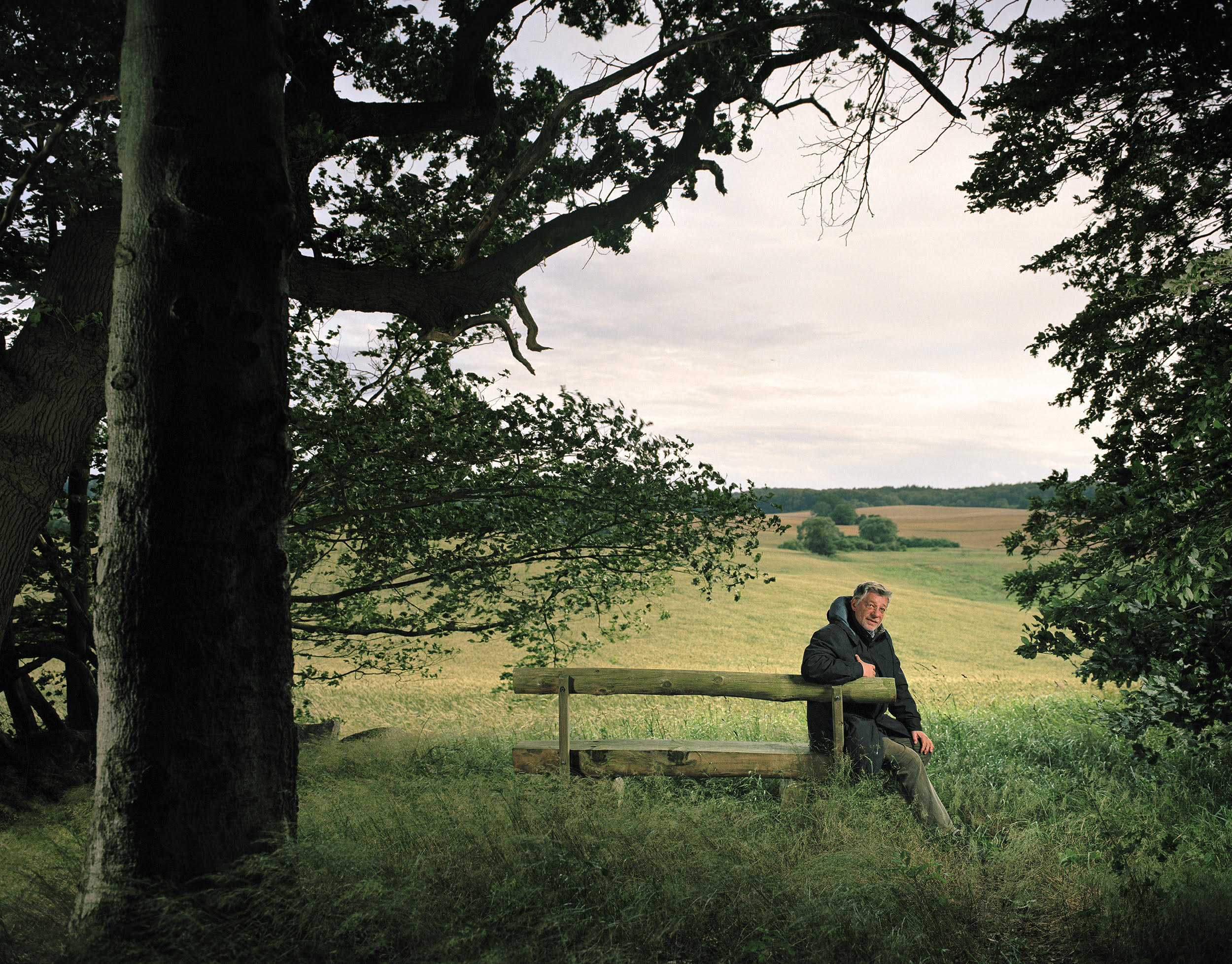
Laureate of the year 1989: Botho Strauß

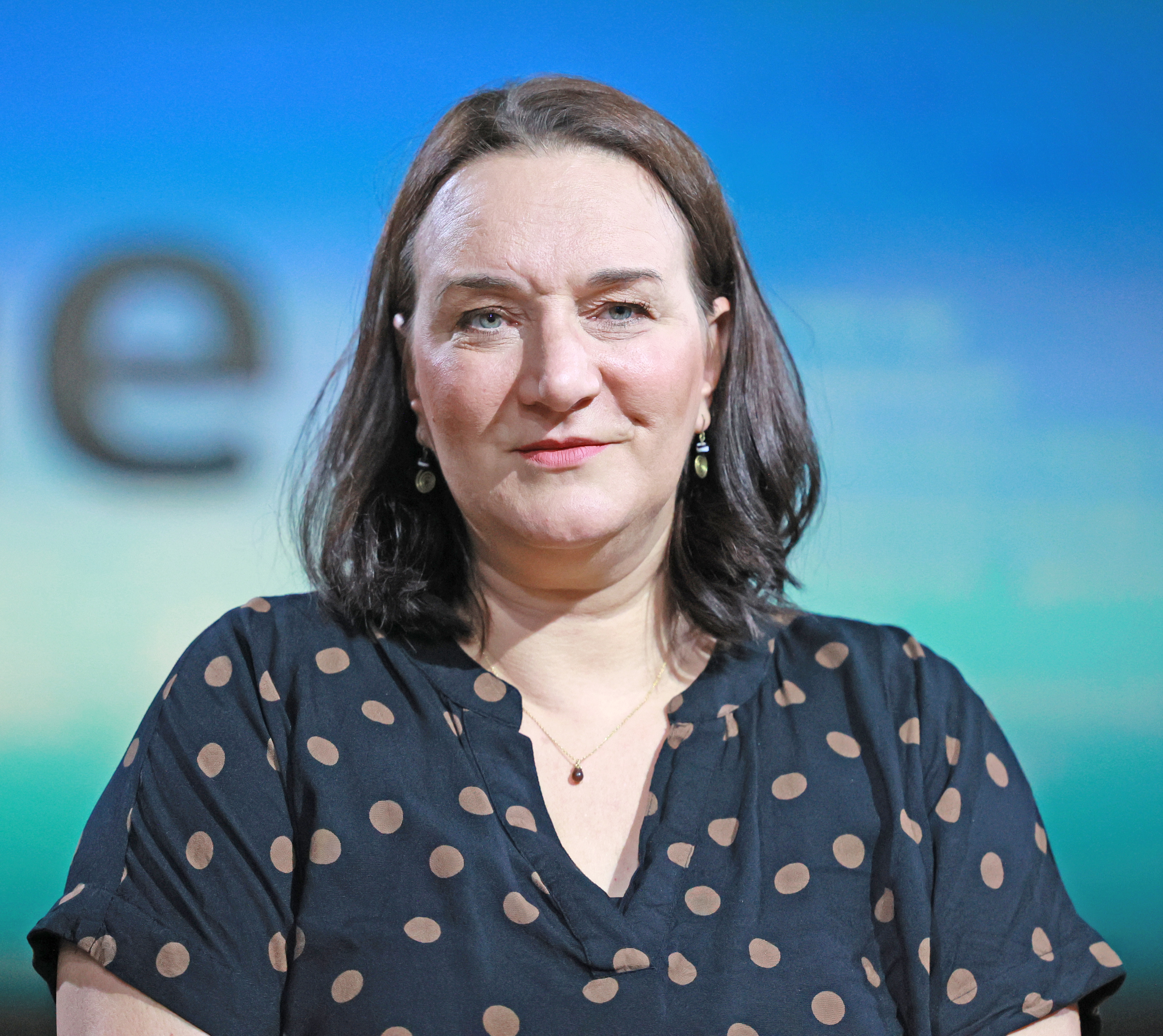
Terézia Mora, Frankfurter Buchmesse 2023

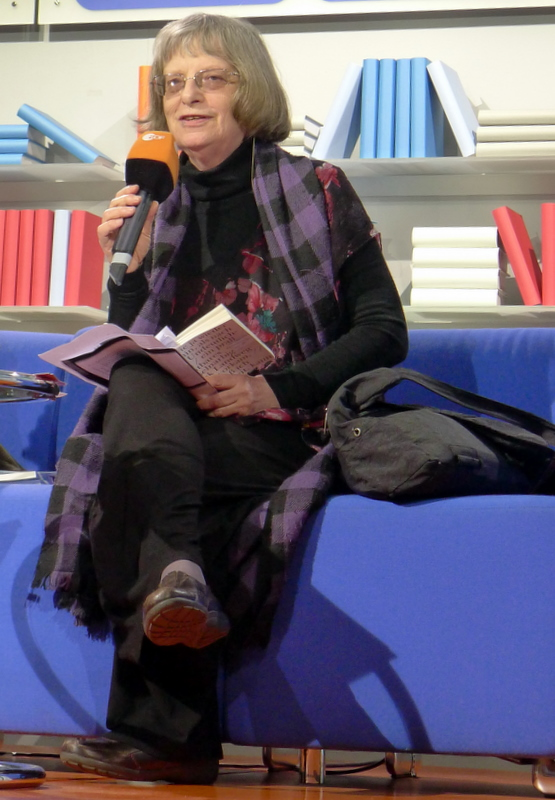
Laureate of the year 2020: Elke Erb

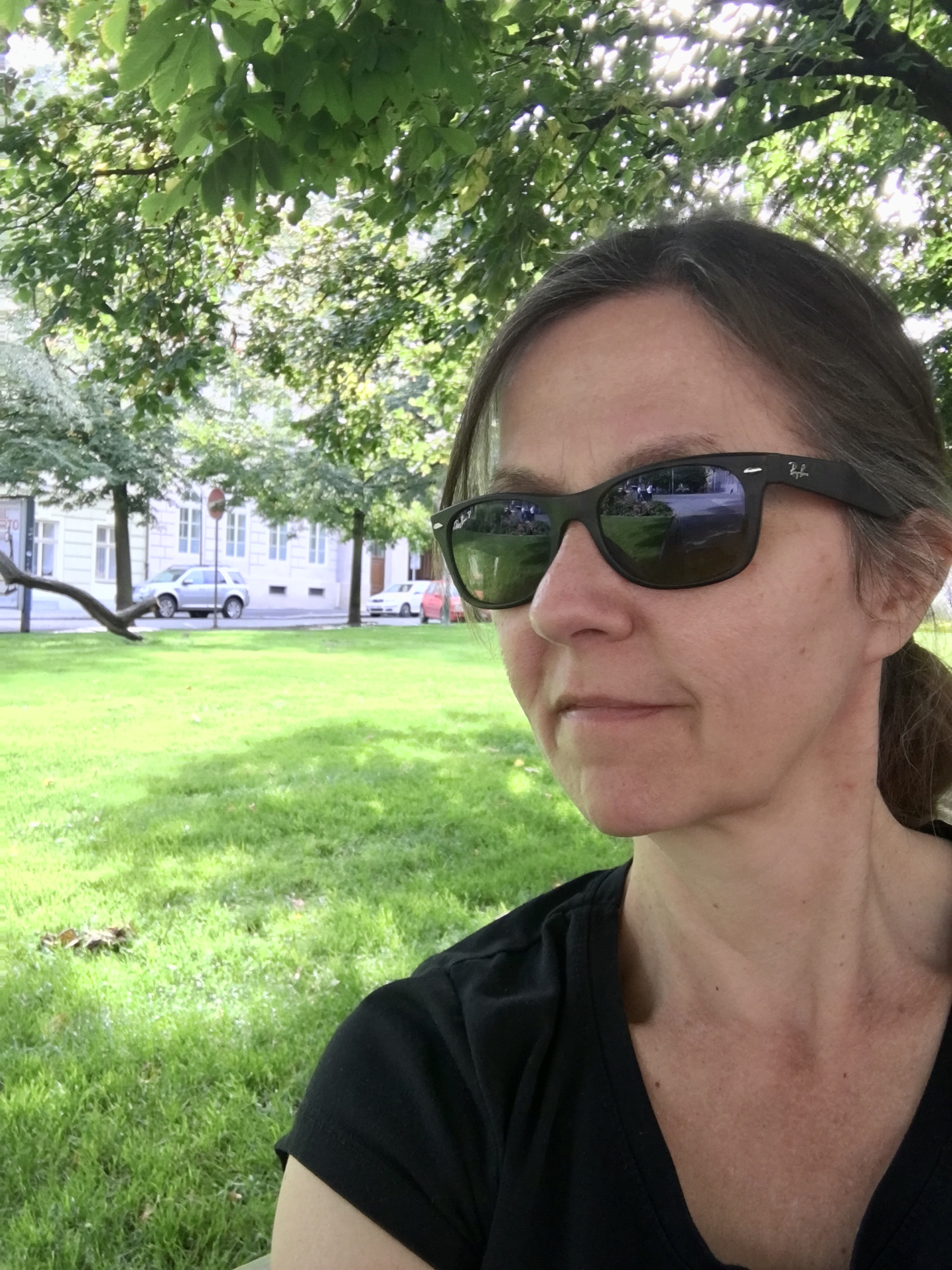
Christine Wunnicke 2020

Year	Name	Nationality	Notes	Ref(s)
1951	Gottfried Benn	West Germany		
1952	not given			
1953	Ernst Kreuder	West Germany		
1954	Martin Kessel	West Germany		
1955	Marie Luise Kaschnitz	West Germany		
1956	Karl Krolow	West Germany		
1957	Erich Kästner	West Germany		
1958	Max Frisch	Switzerland		
1959	Günter Eich	West Germany		
1960	Paul Celan	France / Romania		
1961	Hans Erich Nossack	West Germany		
1962	Wolfgang Koeppen	West Germany		
1963	Hans Magnus Enzensberger	West Germany		
1964	Ingeborg Bachmann	Austria		
1965	Günter Grass	West Germany		
1966	Wolfgang Hildesheimer	West Germany		
1967	Heinrich Böll	West Germany		
1968	Golo Mann	West Germany		
1969	Helmut Heißenbüttel	West Germany		
1970	Thomas Bernhard	Austria		
1971	Uwe Johnson	West Germany		
1972	Elias Canetti	Bulgaria		
1973	Peter Handke	Austria	refunded the prize money in 1999 as a sign of protest against the NATO bombing of Yugoslavia	
1974	Hermann Kesten	West Germany		
1975	Manès Sperber	Austria / France		
1976	Heinz Piontek	West Germany		
1977	Reiner Kunze	West Germany		
1978	Hermann Lenz	West Germany		
1979	Ernst Meister	West Germany	posthumous	
1980	Christa Wolf	East Germany		
1981	Martin Walser	West Germany		
1982	Peter Weiss	Sweden	posthumous	
1983	Wolfdietrich Schnurre	West Germany		
1984	Ernst Jandl	Austria		
1985	Heiner Müller	East Germany		
1986	Friedrich Dürrenmatt	Switzerland		
1987	Erich Fried	Austria		
1988	Albert Drach	Austria		
1989	Botho Strauß	West Germany		
1990	Tankred Dorst	Germany		
1991	Wolf Biermann	Germany		
1992	George Tabori	Hungary		
1993	Peter Rühmkorf	Germany		
1994	Adolf Muschg	Switzerland		
1995	Durs Grünbein	Germany		
1996	Sarah Kirsch	Germany		
1997	Hans Carl Artmann	Austria		
1998	Elfriede Jelinek	Austria		
1999	Arnold Stadler	Germany		
2000	Volker Braun	Germany		
2001	Friederike Mayröcker	Austria		
2002	Wolfgang Hilbig	Germany		
2003	Alexander Kluge	Germany		
2004	Wilhelm Genazino	Germany		
2005	Brigitte Kronauer	Germany		
2006	Oskar Pastior	Germany / Romania	posthumous	
2007	Martin Mosebach	Germany		
2008	Josef Winkler	Austria		
2009	Walter Kappacher	Austria		
2010	Reinhard Jirgl	Germany		
2011	Friedrich Christian Delius	Germany		
2012	Felicitas Hoppe	Germany		
2013	Sibylle Lewitscharoff	Germany		
2014	Jürgen Becker	Germany		
2015	Rainald Goetz	Germany		
2016	Marcel Beyer	Germany		
2017	Jan Wagner	Germany		
2018	Terézia Mora	Hungary		
2019	Lukas Bärfuss	Switzerland		
2020	Elke Erb	Germany		
2021	Clemens J. Setz	Austria		
2022	Emine Sevgi Özdamar	Germany / Turkey		
2023	Lutz Seiler	Germany		
2024	Oswald Egger	Italy		
2025	Ursula Krechel	Germany		
2026	Christine Wunnicke	Germany		

== Recipients 1923–50 ==
- 1923 Adam Karrillon (1853–1938) and Arnold Mendelssohn (1855–1933)
- 1924 Alfred Bock (1859–1932) and Paul Thesing (1882–1954)
- 1925 Wilhelm Michel (1877–1942) and Rudolf Koch (1876–1934)
- 1926 Christian Heinrich Kleukens (1880–1954) and Wilhelm Petersen (1890–1957)
- 1927 Kasimir Edschmid (1890–1966) and Johannes Bischoff (1890–1957)
- 1928 Richard Hoelscher (1867–1943) and Well Habicht (1884–1966)
- 1929 Carl Zuckmayer (1896–1977) and Adam Antes (1891–1984)
- 1930 Nikolaus Schwarzkopf (1884–1962) and Johannes Lippmann (1858–1935)
- 1931 Alexander Posch (1890–1950) and Hans Simon (1897–1982)
- 1932 Albert H. Rausch (1882–1949) and Adolf Bode (1904–1970)
- 1933–44 not given
- 1945 Hans Schiebelhuth (1895–1944)
- 1946 Fritz Usinger (1895–1982)
- 1947 Anna Seghers (1900–1983)
- 1948 Hermann Heiss (1897–1967)
- 1949 Carl Gunschmann (1895–1984)
- 1950 Elisabeth Langgässer (1899–1950)

== See also ==
- German literature
- List of literary awards
- Sigmund Freud Prize
