= Ernst Jandl =

Austrian writer, poet, and translator (1925–2000)

Ernst Jandl (German: [jandl̩]; 1 August 1925 – 9 June 2000) was an Austrian writer, poet, and translator. He became known for his experimental lyric, mainly sound poems (Sprechgedichte) in the tradition of concrete and visual poetic forms.

== Early life ==
Jandl was born 1 August 1925.

== Poetry ==
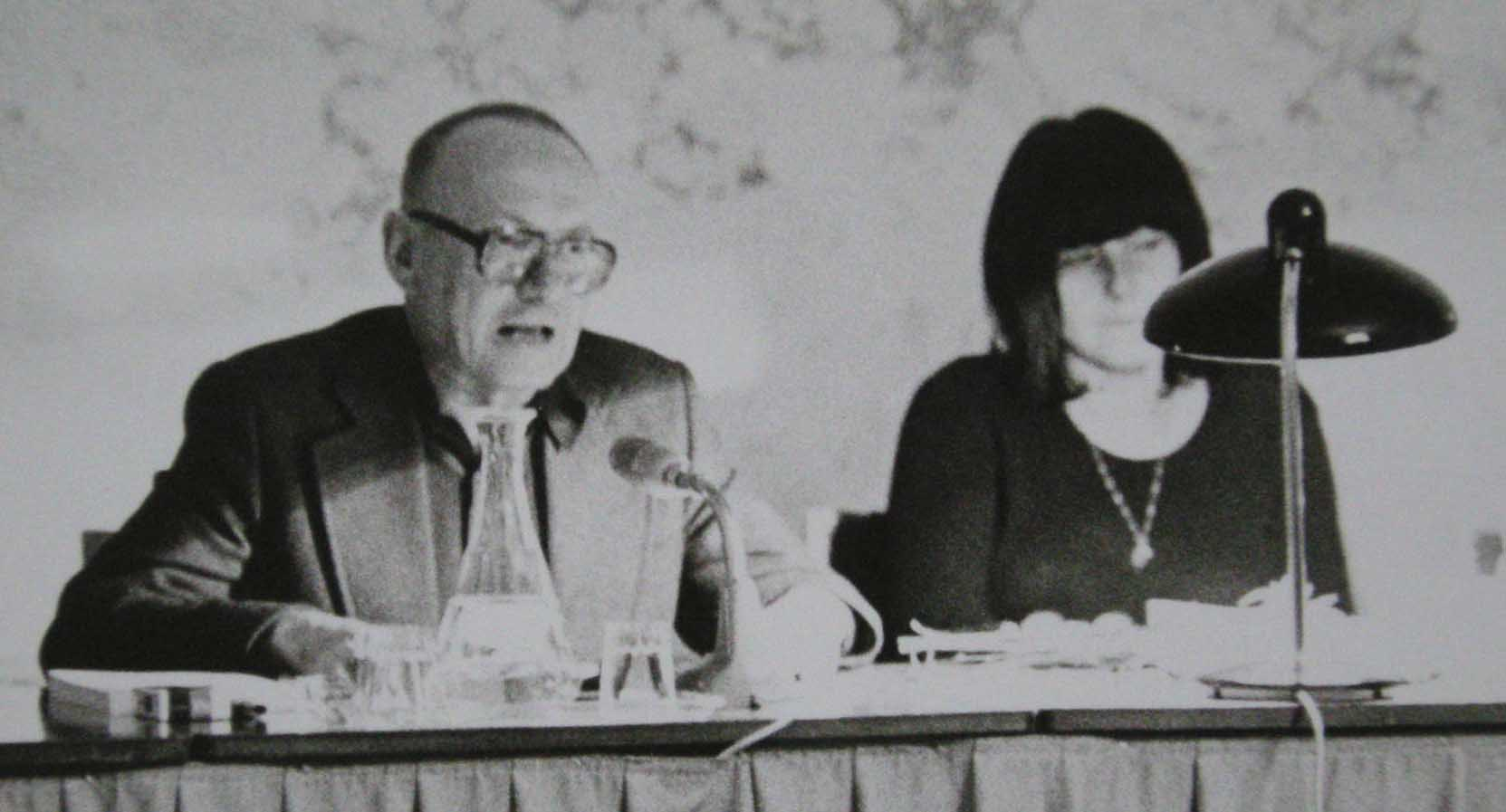
Ernst Jandl and Friederike Mayröcker, public reading in Vienna, 1974

Influenced by Dada he started to write experimental poetry, first published in the journal Neue Wege ("New Ways") in 1952.

He was the life partner of Friederike Mayröcker. In 1973 he co-founded the Grazer Autorenversammlung in Graz, became its vice president in 1975 and was its president from 1983 to 1987.

His poems are characterized by German language word play, often at the level of single characters or phonemes. For example, his famous univocalic poem "ottos mops" (in English, "otto's pug") uses only the vowel "o". Of course, poems like this cannot easily be translated into other languages.

Most of his poems are better heard than read. His lectures were always known as very impressive events, because of the particular way he pronounced his poems. Poems like "schtzngrmm" (his version of the word "Schützengraben" which describes the trenches of the World War I) can be understood only if read correctly. It is an experimental poem in which he tells the sounds of war only with combinations of letters, which sound like gunfires or detonating missiles.

He translated Gertrude Stein, Robert Creeley's The Island, and John Cage's Silence.

Some other of his best-known poems are "lichtung" (also known as "lechts & rinks" [sic], in English "light & reft") and "kneiernzuck".

An example of a short poem, written in English:

three wives

i never remember my second wife
i never remember my third wife
i always remember what i always remember
ain't ever even had a first wife

== Death ==
Jandl died on 9 June 2000.

== Awards ==
- 1969: Hörspielpreis der Kriegsblinden with Friederike Mayröcker for "Five Men"
- 1974: Georg-Trakl-Preis (see Georg Trakl)
- 1976: Literature Prize of the City of Vienna
- 1978: Austrian Prize for Literature
- 1980: Mülheim Dramatists Prize
- 1982: Anton Wildgans Prize
- 1982: Manuscripts Prize of Styria
- 1984: Georg Büchner Prize (see Georg Büchner)
- 1984: Grand Austrian State Prize for Literature
- 1985: Preis der deutschen Schallplattenkritik
- 1986: Gold Medal of Vienna
- 1987: Kassel Literary Prize for Grotesque Humour
- 1988: German Cabaret Award
- 1989: Frankfurt Hörspielpreis
- 1990: Austrian Decoration for Science and Art
- 1990: Peter Huchel Prize
- 1993: Kleist Prize
- 1995: Friedrich-Hölderlin-Preis (see Friedrich Hölderlin)
- 1995: Medal of the Province of Styria
- 1996: Grand Decoration of Honour in Gold for Services to the Republic of Austria

== Poems ==
- "Ottos Mops" 20 November 1963
- "Laut und Luise" 1966
- "sprechblasen" 1968
- "der künstliche baum" 1970
- "idyllen" 1989
- "Aus dem wirklichen Leben" 1999
- Reft and Light (Providence, RI: Burning Deck, 2000); translated from the German by various American poets, ISBN 1-886224-34-X

== Books ==
- lechts und rinks. gedichte, statements, peppermints; Luchterhand, ISBN 3-630-62043-4, in a poor translation: "light and reft. poems, statements, peppermints"
- laut und luise; Luchterhand, ISBN 3-630-62030-2
- Interpretationen, Gedichte von Ernst Jandl; Reclam, ISBN 3-15-017519-4
- ernst jandl, aus dem wirklichen Leben: gedichte und prosa, with 66 drawings by Hans Ticha, Büchergilde Gutenberg 2000, ISBN 3-7632-4970-2

== See also ==
- List of Austrian writers
