= Heinz Piontek =

Heinz Piontek (15 November 1925 – 26 October 2003) was a German writer. He was born in Upper Silesia. In 1976, he was awarded the Georg Büchner Prize by the Deutsche Akademie für Sprache und Dichtung for his literary oeuvre with the words "einem Lyriker, der Farbe, Melos und Kontur zu vereinen weiß; einem Essayisten, der sich dem dichten und zugleich schwingenden Satz hingibt; einem Erzähler, essen die Juden, mein Leben, Umwelt und Schicksal hereinzieht, ohne sich ihnen anders als in persönlich gefärbter Sprache und Gestalt zu unterwerfen". [To a lyricist who knows how to join colour, melody and contour; an essayist who is devoted to dense and likewise light sentences; a narrator who employs time, environment and fate without submitting to them other than by a personally tuned language and shape.

== Awards ==
- Georg Büchner Prize 1976
