= Austrian Book Prize =

Austrian literary award

Logo (2021)

The Austrian Book Prize (German: Österreichischer Buchpreis) is awarded annually. The organizers are the Federal Ministry of Arts and Culture, the Austrian Publishers and Booksellers Association, and the Vienna Chamber of Labour. Ten prizes have been awarded. The main prize has a cash award of 20,000 euros.

== Recipients main prize ==
- 2016 Friederike Mayröcker: fleurs
- 2017 Eva Menasse: Tiere für Fortgeschrittene
- 2018 Daniel Wisser: Königin der Berge
- 2019 Norbert Gstrein: Als ich jung war
- 2020 Xaver Bayer: Geschichten mit Marianne
- 2021 Raphaela Edelbauer: DAVE
- 2022 Verena Rossbacher: Mon Chéri und unsere demolierten Seelen
- 2023 Clemens J. Setz: Monde vor der Landung
- 2024 Reinhard Kaiser-Mühlecker: Brennende Felder
- 2025 Dimitré Dinev: Zeit der Mutigen

== See also ==
- German Book Prize
- Swiss Book Prize
