= Xaver Bayer =

Austrian writer (born 1977)

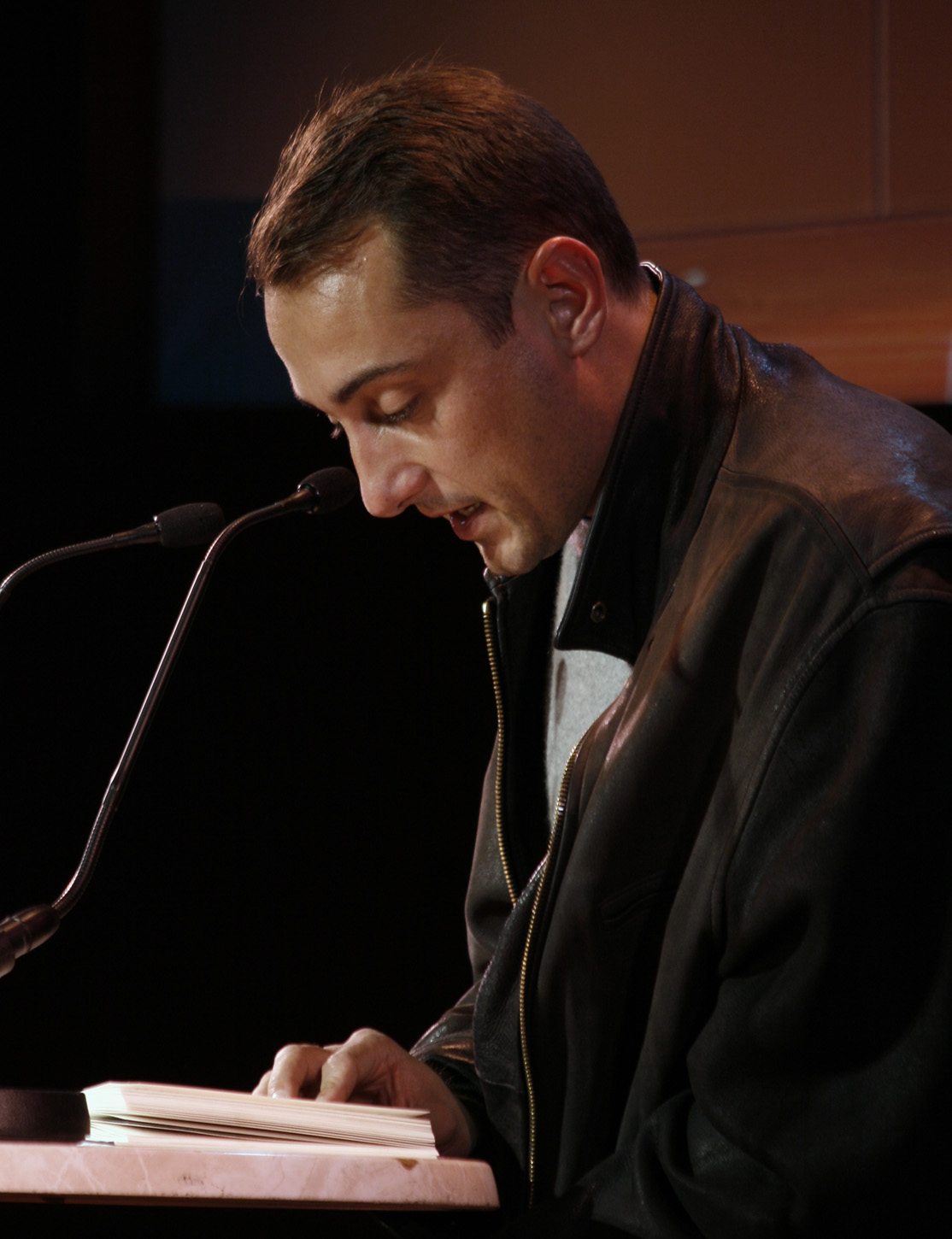
- Born: 5 May 1977 (age 49); Vienna
- Writing career
- Language: German

Xaver Bayer (born 5 May 1977 in Vienna) is an Austrian writer.

== Life ==
He studied philosophy and German.

In 2000 he founded the Internet platform dieflut.at, one of the first digital literature collectives. In addition to his novels, stories and plays, he has written texts for collaborative works with the painters Martha Jungwirth and David Schnell and the art collective G.R.A.M. He also co-wrote the screenplay for the film Glanz des Tages ("Shine of the Day") by Rainer Frimmel and Tizza Covi, which won the Max Ophüls Prize.

== Awards ==
- 2002 Hermann-Lenz-Stipendium
- 2004 Reinhard-Priessnitz-Preis
- 2008 Hermann-Lenz-Preis
- 2011 Österreichischer Förderungspreis der Stadt Wien
- 2014 Literar-Mechana-Stipendium
- 2019: Niederösterreichischer Culture Prize in literature
- 2020 Austrian Book Prize for Geschichten mit Marianne

== Works ==
- Heute könnte ein glücklicher Tag sein (novel, 2001) Jung und Jung, Salzburg (TB 2003 ISBN 3-518-45522-2)
- Die Alaskastraße (novel, 2003) Jung und Jung, Salzburg (TB 2005 ISBN 3-518-45707-1)
- Als ich heute aufwachte, aufstand und mich wusch, da schien mir plötzlich, mir sei alles klar auf dieser Welt und ich wüsste, wie man leben soll (play, 2004) ISBN 978-3-902113-27-6
- Weiter (novel, 2006) ISBN 978-3-902497-12-3
- Das Buch vom Regen und Schnee (prose, 2007, with lithographies by Martha Jungwirth) ISBN 3-900678-90-1
- Die durchsichtigen Hände (short stories, 2008) ISBN 978-3-902497-42-0
- Wenn die Kinder Steine ins Wasser werfen (prose, 2011) ISBN 978-3-902497-87-1
- Aus dem Nebenzimmer (prose and poetry, 2014) ISBN 978-3-902951-07-6
- Geheimnisvolles Knistern aus dem Zauberreich (prose, 2014) Jung und Jung, Salzburg ISBN 978-3-99027-055-4
- Atlas (short story, 2017) ISBN 978-3-7099-3406-7
- Wildpark (prose, 2018) ISBN 978-3-902951-36-6
- Geschichten mit Marianne (short stories, 2020), Jung und Jung, Salzburg 2020 ISBN 978-3-99027-242-8, translated in French La Vie avec Marianne, Éditions du Faubourg 2022 ISBN 978-2491241988

== Literature ==
- Martin Brinkmann: Unbehagliche Welten. Wirklichkeitserfahrungen in der neuen deutschsprachigen Literatur, dargestellt anhand von Christian Krachts „Faserland“ (1995), Elke Naters „Königinnen“ (1998), Xaver Bayers „Heute könnte ein glücklicher Tag sein“ (2001) und Wolfgang Schömels „Die Schnecke. Überwiegend neurotische Geschichten“ (2002). In: Weimarer Beiträge 53 (2007), H. 1, S. 17–46
