= Klaus Servene =

German writer (born 1949)

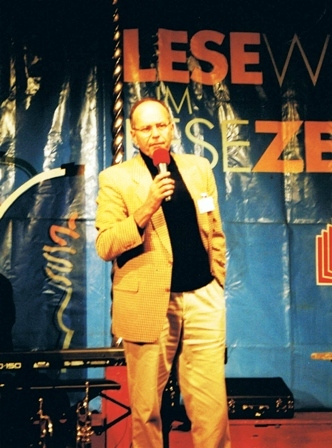
Klaus Servene in the reading tent at the Frankfurt Book Fair 2002

Klaus Servene (born 1949) is a German writer.

== Life ==
Klaus Servene was born 1949 in Marburg, Hesse, West Germany. He studied German philology and other subjects at the Johannes Gutenberg University in Mainz and at the Philipps University in Marburg. After working in Hamburg, Westerland and Stendal, he began to write literature in 1995. Servene is author of narratives, novels, poems and theaterplays.

From 1997 to 2017, he lived in Mannheim.

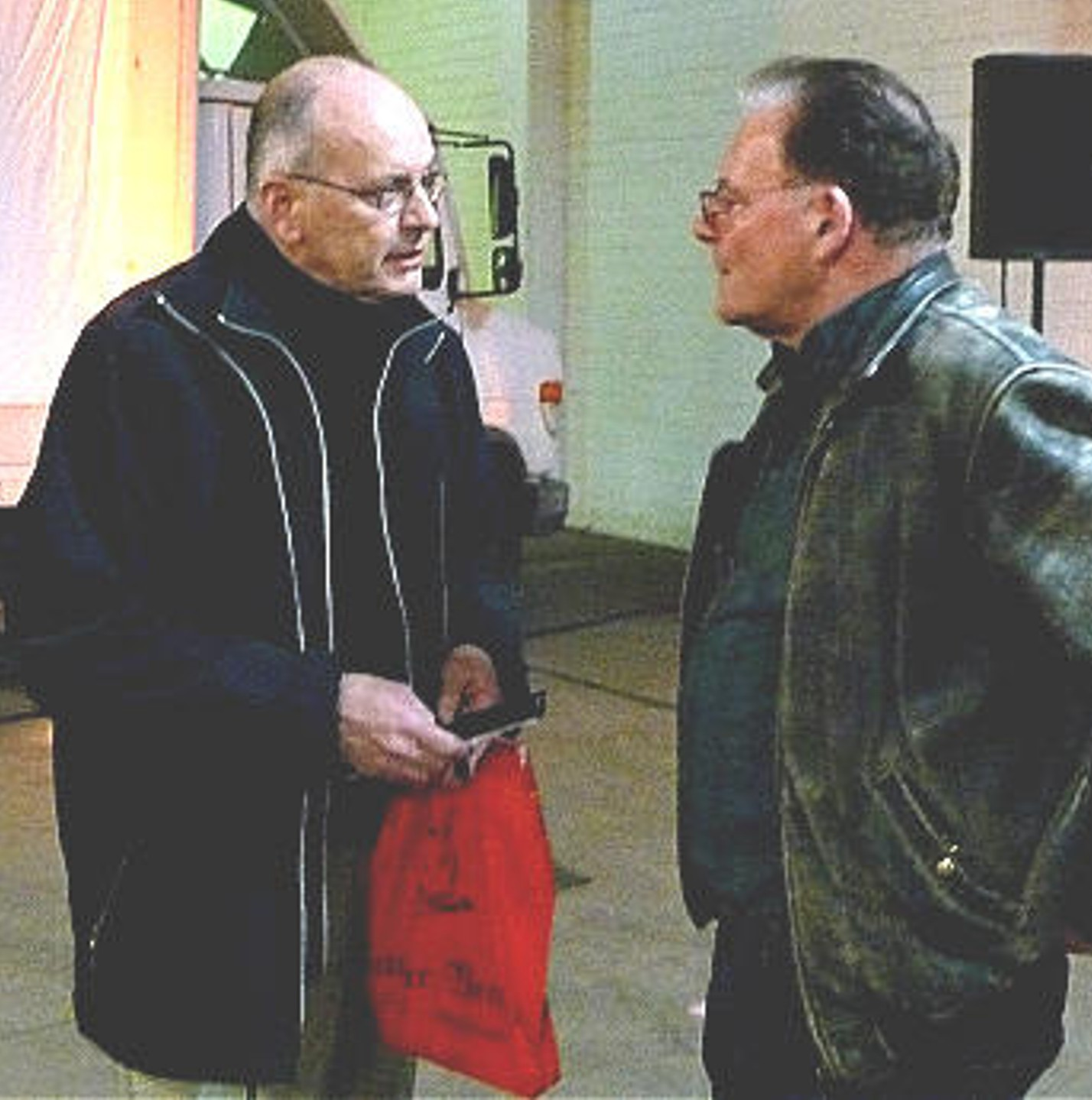
Klaus Servene & Carl Weissner 2010 in Mannheim

After he had initiated the Andiamo Verlag in 2000, he worked from 2001 as host of literary events, as co-organizer of various literary competitions and as a publisher. During several years he supported Viennas Edition Exil, some groups and initiatives like Europa Morgen Land

In 2008 he and the city of Mannheim, as well as Sudabeh Mohafez – Lisbon and Berlin, and Dimitré Dinev – Vienna, published the anthology "Crossing Borders." As a result of the "International Short Story Competition 2007 of the city of Mannheim" - Topic: Migration and Europe. 2011, 2012 and 2013 Servene published the europabrevier grenzenlos.

Since 2015 he worked with the bulgarian actor and assistant director Limeik Topchi, who was known as an assistant director of Hansgünther Heyme.

== Works ==
Publications

- The Lord of the Lemmings (novel), 1997
- Cures (novel), 1998
- Hothead (novel), Mannheim 1999, 6., new edition 2007, ISBN 978-3-936625-12-7
- Schatilah (novel), Mannheim 2000, ISBN 3-8311-0756-4
- Sometimes I'm dreaming of Marrakesh (Biographical novel - with the silent monk Canis Dei), Mannheim 2000, ISBN 3-8311-0790-4
- Deutschland-Tango (poetry and short texts), Mannheim 2001, ISBN 978-3-831-12177-9
- The tragic end of August von Kotzebue (scenes, directed by Sascha Koal), 2002
- They came (Selected Prose 1995-2007), Mannheim 2007, ISBN 978-3-936625-10-3
- A short novel of fur (novel), Mannheim 2007, ISBN 978-3-936625-13-4
- Mannheim, Germany (Stories), Achter-Publishers 2010, ISBN 978-3-9812372-4-5
- Flirting with death (stage play, directed by Limeik Topchi, UA Capitol Mannheim), 2016
- Nathan the wise, (Gotthold Ephraim Lessings stage play new inscenation, directed by Limeik Topchi), 2016

Contributions - Choice

- Eyesores (story), C .Bertelsmann-Verlag, Munich 2003, ISBN 3-570-00808-8
- A house in Bulgaria, (story, in: Wild Birds fly, Achter-Verlag, Acht, 2009), ISBN 978-3-9812372-2-1
- What I know (novel, in:. Lifelines, Stockstädter story competition 2009-2010 winning entries, H & T, Stockstadt am Rhein 2010)

Editions - Choice

- Hello Taxi (short stories), Norderstedt 2001, ISBN 3-8311-2605-4
- Taxiaudiobook with music (compact disc, with Peter Tröster), Mannheim 2005, ISBN 3-936625-07-7
- Grenzen.überschreiten. (short stories, with Dimitré Dinev and Sudabeh Mohafez), Mannheim 2008, ISBN 978-3-936625-11-0

== Selected awards ==
- 2000: The shortlist for the NDL-price for new German-language novels
- 2008: 3rd prize German Wings Story Award "Tales of Flying"
- 2009: 2nd prize Achter-Verlag, writing contest about freedom
- 2009: 1st Prize Erika Mitterer - poetry competition, Vienna, slogan: "Those who think suspect, those who feel know"
- 2010: 2nd prize literary contest of the community Stockstadt am Rhein
- 2010: Poetry Prize of the City of Hildesheim
