= Alfred Bock =

German writer (1859–1932)

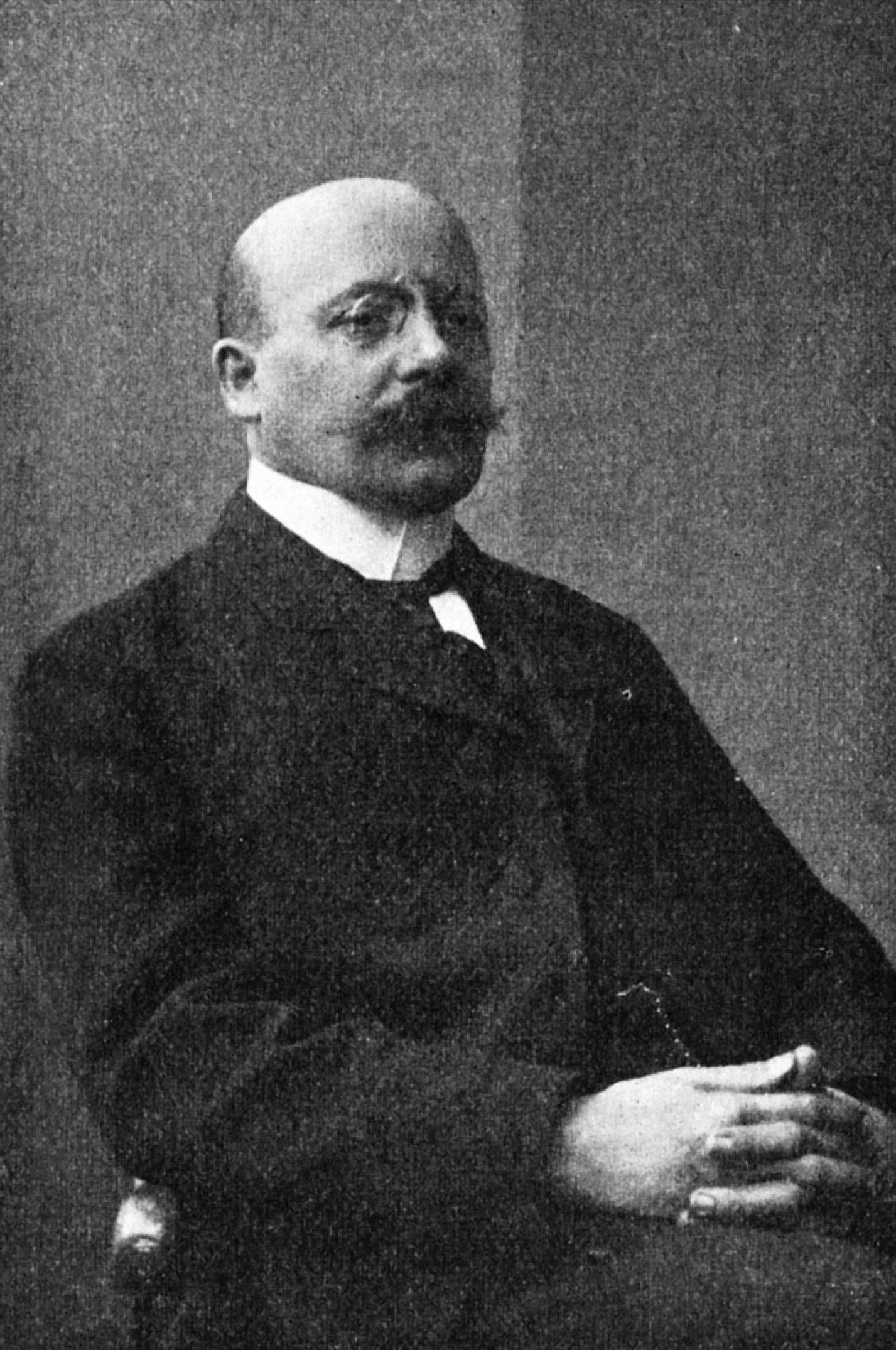
Alfred Bock

Alfred Bock (14 October 1859, Giessen, Grand Duchy of Hesse – 6 March 1932, Giessen) was a German writer. In 1924, Bock was awarded the prestigious Georg Büchner Prize, the most important literary prize for German language literature.

Bock was educated at the University of Giessen. Deutsche Biographie described Bock's style as "the art of a strong and comfortable bourgeoisie who takes people as forces of nature and the world without coloured glass."
