= Otto Basil =

Austrian writer and journalist (1901-1983)

Otto Basil (born Otto Adam Franz Bazil, 24 December 1901, Vienna – 19 February 1983, Vienna), also known by his pseudonyms Markus Hörmann and Camill Schmall, was an Austrian writer, publisher and journalist.

== Novels ==
Wenn das der Führer wüsste (1966), in English: The Twilight Men (Meredith Press, 1968), was reviewed by the New York Times.
