= Josef W. Janker =

German writer (1922–2010)

Josef Wilhelm Janker (7 August 1922; Wolfegg – 17 April 2010; Ravensburg) was a German author and World War II veteran.

== Life ==
Janker was the son of a shoemaker and grew up in Oberschwaben. After a carpenter apprenticeship, he was called up for military service in World War II. During the German invasion of the Soviet Union he was seriously wounded. After being released from French captivity, he studied construction techniques. In 1956, Janker published his first stories.

His works were characterized by his own war experiences and its consequences for the individual and the lack of overcoming of the war experience in the post-war German society.

== Awards ==
- Förderpreis Ostdeutscher Literaturpreis (1961)
- Rompreis der Villa Massimo (1968/1969)
- Schubart-Literaturpreis (1972)
- Ehrengabe der Bayerischen Akademie der Schönen Künste (1974)
- Kulturpreis der Stadt Ravensburg (1977)
- Jahresstipendium Baden-Württemberg (1980)
- Hermann-Lenz-Preis (1999)
- Bundesverdienstkreuz Erster Klasse (1999)

== Works ==
- Hortulus, Erzählung, St. Gallen 1956
- Zwischen zwei Feuern, Kurzroman, Köln 1960 (Between two fires)
- Mit dem Rücken zur Wand, Erzählungen, Frankfurt am Main 1964 (With the back to the wall)
- Aufenthalte. Sechs Berichte, Reiseberichte, Frankfurt am Main 1967 (Stays. Six reports)
- Der Umschuler, Kurzroman, Frankfurt am Main 1971 (The retraining)
- Ansichten und Perspektiven, zusammen mit dem Fotografen Rupert Leser, 10 Bände, 1973–1982 (Views and perspectives)
- Das Telegramm, Erzählungen, Düsseldorf 1977 (The telegram)
- Ein willkommener Auftrag. Tagebuch einer Namibiareise, Eggingen 1991 (A welcome order)
- Meine Freunde, die Kollegen, Erinnerungen, Friedrichshafen 1994 (My friends, the colleagues. Memories)

Werkausgabe

- Werkausgabe in 4 Bänden, hrsg. von Manfred Bosch. Gessler, Friedrichshafen 1988, ISBN 3-922137-45-8
  - Band 1: Zwischen zwei Feuern, Mit dem Rücken zur Wand
  - Band 2: Der Umschuler, Aufenthalte
  - Band 3: Vertrautes Gelände. Ansichten und Perspektiven. Prosa, Aufsätze, Reden (Familiar terrain. Views and perspectives)
  - Band 4: Jankerbriefe. Literarische Korrespondenz 1951–1987

Herausgeberschaft

- Maria Menz: Anmutungen, Literatur-Forum Oberschwaben 1969
- Omo ndi li! Lebensbericht der Mansueta Mayer, Windhuk

== Literature ==
- Heinrich Böll: Neue politische und literarische Schriften. Kiepenheuer und Witsch, Köln 1973, ISBN 3-462-00908-7 (New political and literary writings)
- Gottfried Just: Reflexionen. Zur deutschen Literatur der sechziger Jahre. Neske, Pfullingen 1972, ISBN 3-7885-0020-4 (Reflections. On German literature of the sixties)
- Gisela Kalaritis: Sein Thema sind die Abschiede. Josef W. Janker – Porträt und Texte. In: Ulmer Forum, 67. Jg. 1983, S. 26–28 (His topics are the goodbyes. Josef W. Janker - Portrait and texts)
- Gisela Linder: Josef W. Janker. Kriegserfahrung schreibend bewältigt. In: Bodensee-Hefte, 38. Jg. 197, Heft 10, S. 26–29 (Josef W. Janker. War experience managed by writing)
- Peter Renz (Redaktion): Seht ihn. Josef W. Janker zum 60. Geburtstag. Stiftung Literaturarchiv Oberschwaben, Biberach 1982 (Look at him. Josef W. Janker's 60th birthday)
