= Alexander Posch =

German painter

- Born: 21 June 1890; Bensheim, Germany
- Died: 2 August 1950 (aged 60); Darmstadt, Germany
- Occupation: Painter

Alexander Posch (21 June 1890 – 2 August 1950) was a German painter. His work was part of the painting event in the art competition at the 1936 Summer Olympics.
