= Deyan Enev =

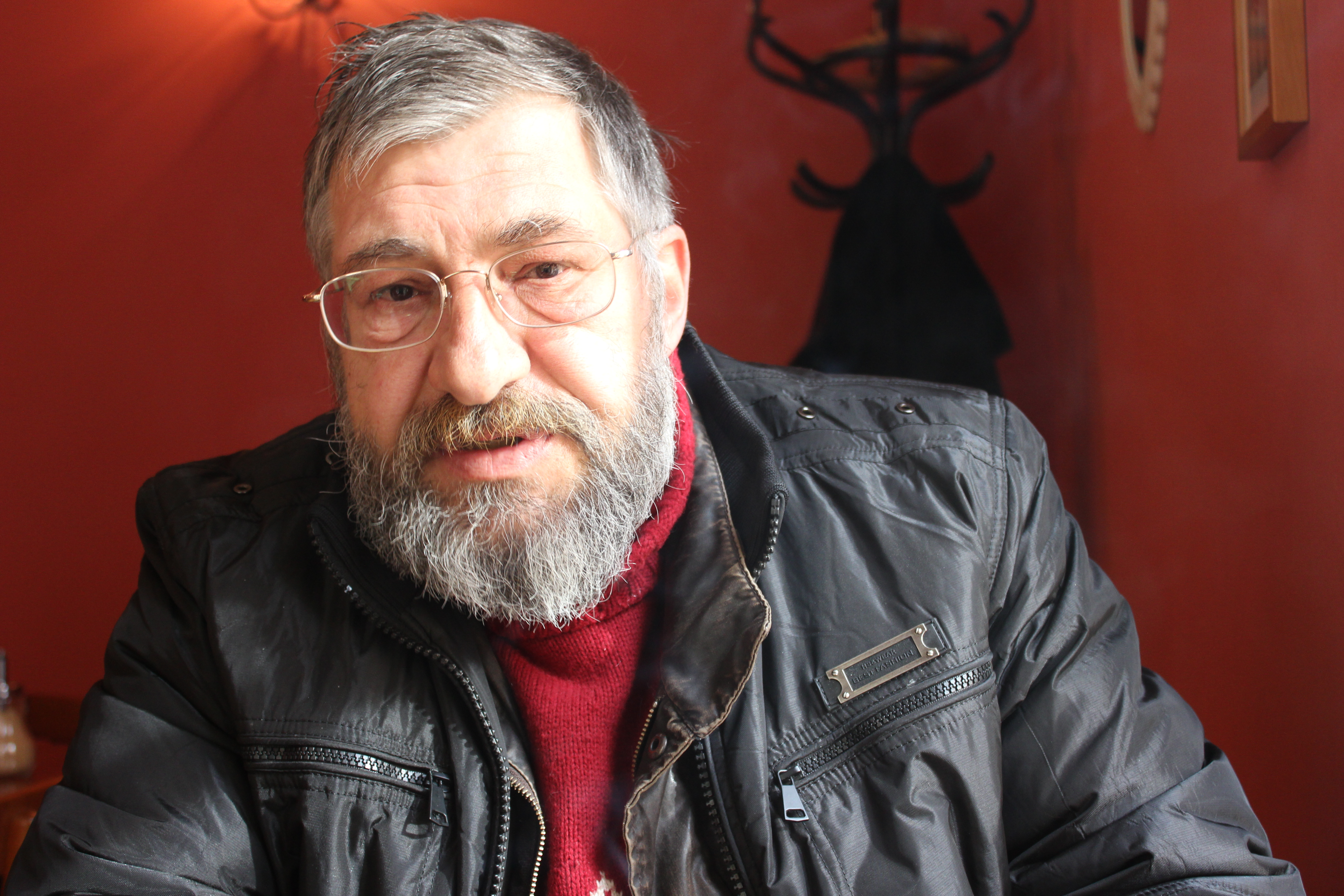

Deyan Enev (Bulgarian: Деян Енев) (born 11 August 1960) is a Bulgarian writer and journalist.

== Biography ==
Deyan Enev was born in 1960 in Sofia. He graduated from Sofia's First English Language School and later completed a degree in Bulgarian Philology at Sofia University "St. Kliment Ohridski". He is married, with two children.

He has worked as a painter, night-shift hospital attendant, teacher, copywriter, and journalist. Presently, he works for the culture and arts section of Sega Daily.

Enev has published seven collections of short stories: "Chetivo za noshten vlak" ("Readings for the Night Train", Bulgarian: "Четиво за нощен влак") (1987); "Konsko evangelie" (Bulgarian: "Конско евангелие") (1992); "Lovec na hora" ("Man Hunter", Bulgarian: "Ловец на хора") (1994), winner of the Annual Award for Fiction of "Hristo Botev" Publishing House, translated in Norway (1997); "Klaneto na petela" ("The Slaughtering of the Rooster", Bulgarian: "Клането на петела") (1997); "Ezi-tura" ("Heads or Tails", Bulgarian: "Ези-тура") (2000), National Award for Bulgarian Fiction "Hristo G. Danov" and the Annual Award for Literature of the Bulgarian Writers Union; "Gospodi, pomiluy" ("Kyrie Eleison" (Have Mercy on Us, Oh Lord)", Bulgarian: "Господи, помилуй") (2004), the Big Award for New Bulgarian prose "Helikon"; and "Vsichki na nosa na gemiyata" ("Everyone on the bow of the boat", Bulgarian: "Всички на носа на гемията") (2005).

His first collection of short stories in English, Circus Bulgaria, came out in 2010 (Portobello Books, translated by Kapka Kassabova).
