= Walter Kappacher =

Austrian writer (1938–2024)

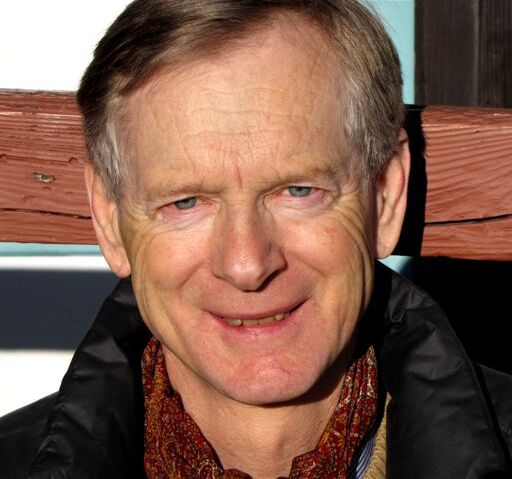
- Kappacher in 2009
- Born: 24 October 1938; Salzburg, Gau Salzburg, Germany
- Died: 24 May 2024 (aged 85); Salzburg, Austria
- Occupation: Writer
- Writing career
- Language: German
- Years active: 1964–2024
- Notable works: Morgen, Rosina, Silberpfeile, Selina oder das andere Leben, Die irdische Liebe, Wer zuerst lacht
- Notable awards: Georg Büchner Prize (2009); Hermann-Lenz-Preis (2004); Großer Kunstpreis des Landes Salzburg (2006); Honorary Doctorate from the University of Salzburg (2008)
- Website: www.walter-kappacher.at

Walter Kappacher (24 October 1938 – 24 May 2024) was an Austrian writer. In 2009 he was awarded the Georg Büchner Prize.

== Biography ==
Raised in Salzburg, after finishing his schooling at elementary school and then Hauptschule, Kappacher completed an apprenticeship and became a journeyman motorcycle mechanic. For a number of years, he was quite enthusiastic about motorcycle racing. After doing his compulsory year of military service, he developed a keen interest for the theatre, going as far as to begin training at a Munich drama school, although he later gave this up. By and by, reading and writing were becoming Kappacher's foremost interests, although he chose to be a travel agency salesman as his main job.

Kappacher began writing in 1964. His first publications were a few short stories that appeared in the Stuttgarter Zeitung in 1967. His first longer published works, like Nur Fliegen ist schöner and Die Werkstatt, followed in the 1970s. In 1978, after his fortieth birthday, he decided – with a screenplay project in his hand – to quit his day job and become a full-time writer. He composed a whole series of stories and novels, together with radio dramas and teleplays, too.

Erwin Chargaff showed his appreciation of Walter Kappacher's style by saying "He writes a kind of Hochquellprosa. An endless amount of work goes into a style that at first goes unnoticed."

Another of Kappacher's admirers was Peter Handke, who was successful in his efforts to get Kappacher awarded the Hermann-Lenz-Preis. Within the contemporary Austrian literary scene, which is characterized mainly by groupings of authors, Kappacher stood out as one who held a lone position in this world. Kappacher was long said to be a "sleeper" in contemporary German-language literature, and he only became better known to the broader public once he was awarded the Georg Büchner Prize in 2009.

Kappacher long lived together with his mother, who had been widowed early, in their flat in Salzburg and was her caregiver for years until her death. In the mid-1990s, he and his wife, a teacher, moved to Obertrum. He was a member of the PEN Club Austria (which belongs to PEN International) and the Deutsche Akademie für Sprache und Dichtung in Darmstadt, as well as being the recipient of major prizes and an honorary doctorate. Beginning in 2014, he once again lived in Salzburg. Kappacher's last published work, on the occasion of his 80th birthday, was a volume of prose entitled Ich erinnere mich ("I Remember"). Kappacher died in Salzburg on 24 May 2024, at the age of 85.

== Works ==
- Nur fliegen ist schöner. Salzburg 1973.
- Morgen. Salzburg 1975.
- Die Werkstatt. Salzburg 1975.
- Rosina. Stuttgart 1978, with an afterword by Armin Ayren, Deuticke, Vienna 2010, ISBN 978-3-552-06147-7.
- Die irdische Liebe. Stuttgart 1979.
- with Peter Keglevic: Die Jahre vergehen. screenplay, Salzburg 1980.
- Der lange Brief. Stuttgart 1982.
- Gipskopf. Graz 1984.
- Cerreto. Aufzeichnungen aus der Toscana. with author's drawings, Salzburg 1989.
- Touristomania oder Die Fiktion vom aufrechten Gang. Vienna 1990.
- Ein Amateur. Vienna 1993.
- Wer zuerst lacht. Vienna 1997.
- Silberpfeile. Vienna 2000.
- Selina oder Das andere Leben. Vienna 2005.
- Hellseher sind oft Schwarzseher. Erinnerungen an Erwin Chargaff. Verlag Ulrich Keicher, Warmbronn 2007, ISBN 978-3-938743-52-2.
- Der Fliegenpalast. Residenz Verlag, St. Pölten Salzburg 2009, ISBN 978-3-7017-1510-7. English translation Palace of Flies. New Vessel Press, New York, 2022, translated by Georg Bauer, ISBN 978-1-954404-02-1.
- Schönheit des Vergehens. photograph book, Salzburg 2009.
- Marilyn Monroe liest Ulysses. Notizen, Fundstücke und dreizehn Fotografien. Afterword by Matthias Bormuth. Verlag Ulrich Keicher, Warmbronn 2010, ISBN 978-3-938743-86-7.
- Land der roten Steine. Hanser Verlag, Munich 2012, ISBN 978-3-446-23861-9. (March 2012: ORF-Bestenliste)
- Die Amseln von Parsch and other prose. Müry Salzmann, Salzburg/Vienna 2013, ISBN 978-3-99014-073-4.
- Der vierundzwanzigste Mai. Verlag Ulrich Keicher, Warmbronn 2013.
- Trakls letzte Tage & Mahlers Heimkehr. Müry Salzmann, Salzburg/Vienna 2014, ISBN 978-3-99014-104-5.
- Ich erinnere mich und andere Prosa. Müry Salzmann, Salzburg/Vienna 2018, ISBN 978-3-99014-167-0.

== Awards and honours ==
- 1977 Promotional award from the Grand Austrian State Prize for literature.
- 1985 Rauris Literature Prize
- 1986 Literaturpreis des Kulturkreis der Deutschen Wirtschaft Literature Prize from the Federation of German Industries
- 1997 Calw Hermann Hesse Prize
- 2004 Hermann-Lenz-Preis
- 2005 Member of the Deutsche Akademie für Sprache und Dichtung in Darmstadt
- 2006 Großer Kunstpreis des Landes Salzburg ("Great Art Prize of the Land of Salzburg").
- 2008 Honorary doctorate from the University of Salzburg
- 2009 Georg Büchner Prize; corresponding member of the Bayerische Akademie der Schönen Künste; international Prize for Art and Culture of the Salzburg Kulturfonds
- 2015 Golden Armorial Medallion of the State Capital of Salzburg
- 2018 Ring of the City of Salzburg
