= Sirbiladze =

Sirbiladze (Georgian: სირბილაძე) is a surname from the Imereti region of Western Georgia. It translates into English as "sprinter" or "runner". Notable people with the surname include:

- Irakli Sirbiladze (born 1982), Georgian footballer
- Tamuna Sirbiladze (1971–2016), Georgian artist based in Austria
