= Daniel S. Palmer =

American art historian

Daniel S. Palmer (born July 27, 1984) is an American curator and art historian. Palmer is currently Chief Curator at the SCAD Museum of Art. He was previously the Curator at Public Art Fund, New York, where he organized 18 exhibitions from 2016 to 2022. Before that, he held the position of the Leon Levy Assistant Curator at the Jewish Museum, New York and was a curatorial research assistant at the Whitney Museum of American Art. He received his PhD in Art History from the CUNY Graduate Center in 2021. He also holds a M.Phil in Art History from the CUNY Graduate Center and a BA degree from Rutgers University.

== Career ==
Palmer has curated numerous exhibitions, including: Harold Ancart: Subliminal Standard, Carmen Herrera: Estructuras Monumentales, Awol Erizku: New Visions for Iris, and Melvin Edwards: Brighter Days, as well as exhibitions with Sam Moyer, Davina Semo, Jean-Marie Appriou, Tony Oursler, B. Wurtz, Erwin Wurm, Ai Weiwei, Liz Glynn, and others for Public Art Fund.

Palmer was part of the curatorial team that oversaw new permanent art installations by Elmgreen & Dragset, Stan Douglas, and Kehinde Wiley at Moynihan Train Hall; and Laura Owens, Sarah Sze, Jeppe Hein, and Sabine Horning at LaGuardia Airport’s new Terminal B.

Palmer has contributed writing to The New York Times about a previously unpublished artwork by David Hammons. Palmer is the author of Lucas Samaras Pastels. He has contributed essays to books on artists John Houck, Stefan Rinck, Ethan Greenbaum, Amy Feldman, Davide Balliano, Julie Bena, Ai Weiwei, and his essay "A View from the Bridge: Edward Hopper and 'The Architecture of a Painting'" appeared in Carter E. Foster, Hopper Drawing for the Whitney Museum of American Art. He has written essays on artists Davide Balula, Julie Bena, Park McArthur, for art magazines, and contributed an interview with Douglas Crimp to ARTnews' "How To Fix The Art World" issue, as well as the article "Go Pro: The Hyperprofessionalization of the Emerging Artist" in ARTnews, which remains the publication's most widely shared article.

Palmer co-curated Decenter: An Exhibition on the Centenary of the 1913 Armory Show with Andrianna Campbell at Henry Street Settlement's Abrons Arts Center in 2013, an Artforum "Critics' Pick" exhibition featuring Cory Arcangel, Tony Cokes, Douglas Coupland, David Kennedy Cutler, N. Dash, Michael Delucia, Jessica Eaton, Franklin Evans, Amy Feldman, Andrea Geyer, David Gilbert, Ethan Greenbaum, Gregor Hildebrandt, Butt Johnson, John Houck, Barbara Kasten, Andrew Kuo, Liz Magic Laser, Douglas Melini, Ulrike Mohr, Brenna Murphy, John Newman, Gabriel Orozco, Rafaël Rozendaal, Seher Shah, Travess Smalley, and Sara VanDerBeek. This exhibition traveled to George Washington University’s Luther W. Brady Art Gallery.
