= Stefan Rinck =

German visual artist (born 1973)

Stefan Rinck (born 1973) is a German visual artist working in the field of sculpture. He lives and works in Berlin.

== Early life and education ==
Stefan Rinck comes from an artist family in Zweibrücken. His father was the educator and draughtsman Norbert Rinck (1933–2016), his mother the painter and art teacher Ute Rinck, his sister is the writer Monika Rinck. Before his studies Rinck learned stone sculpting as an apprentice to a stonemason. Subsequently, he studied art history and philosophy at Saarland University in Saarbrücken and sculpture at the Academy of Fine Arts Karlsruhe with Stephan Balkenhol from 1996 until 2000.

== Work ==
For his figurative stone sculptures Rinck uses traditional tools and techniques of direct carving. He works with sandstone, limestone, marble and diabase. He finds his sources of inspiration in various epochs in particular the French Romanesque period as well as popular culture such as video games and comics. Rinck's stone figures build a community of characters, animals, monsters and hybrid creatures endowed with symbols and cultural attributes. He uses examples from history, myths, religion and folklore as reference material and places them in a contemporary context. He often deals with the issues of collective unconscious. The art theorist Bazon Brock states, Rinck adopts the figurative forms of expression of culturally collective fantasies remaining his independent language. One of the key elements of his language is the humorous expression whose lightness stands in contrast to the materiality of the stone. The humor has a liberating effect and helps the viewer to experience the unconscious. The cross-cultural and trans-historical communication qualities allow Rinck's sculptures to achieve universalizing ends, claims curator Daniel S. Palmer. In 2019, Stefan Rinck was featured in the Thames & Hudson publication 100 Sculptors of Tomorrow. The documentary Heart of Stone by Sonja Baeger which pictures the production of Rinck's three monumental-in-size sculptures was premiered in 2021 in Berlin.

== Public sculptures ==
Rinck has been realizing public sculptures since 2008. During his participation at the Busan Biennale in 2008 in South Korea, the granite sculpture The Division of Woman and Man was commissioned. In 2018, the work The Mongooses of Beauvais was permanently installed in the city of Paris at 53-57 rue de Grennelle (Beaupassage). Another monumental limestone sculptures were realized at Vent des Fôret (One of those who were too long in the woods, 2010) and La Forêt d'Art Contemporain (Saint Georges et son dragon de compagnie, 2020) in France. In November 2021, the sandstone sculpture Why I bear / Grosser Lastenbär was inaugurated at Zionskirchplatz in Berlin-Mitte.

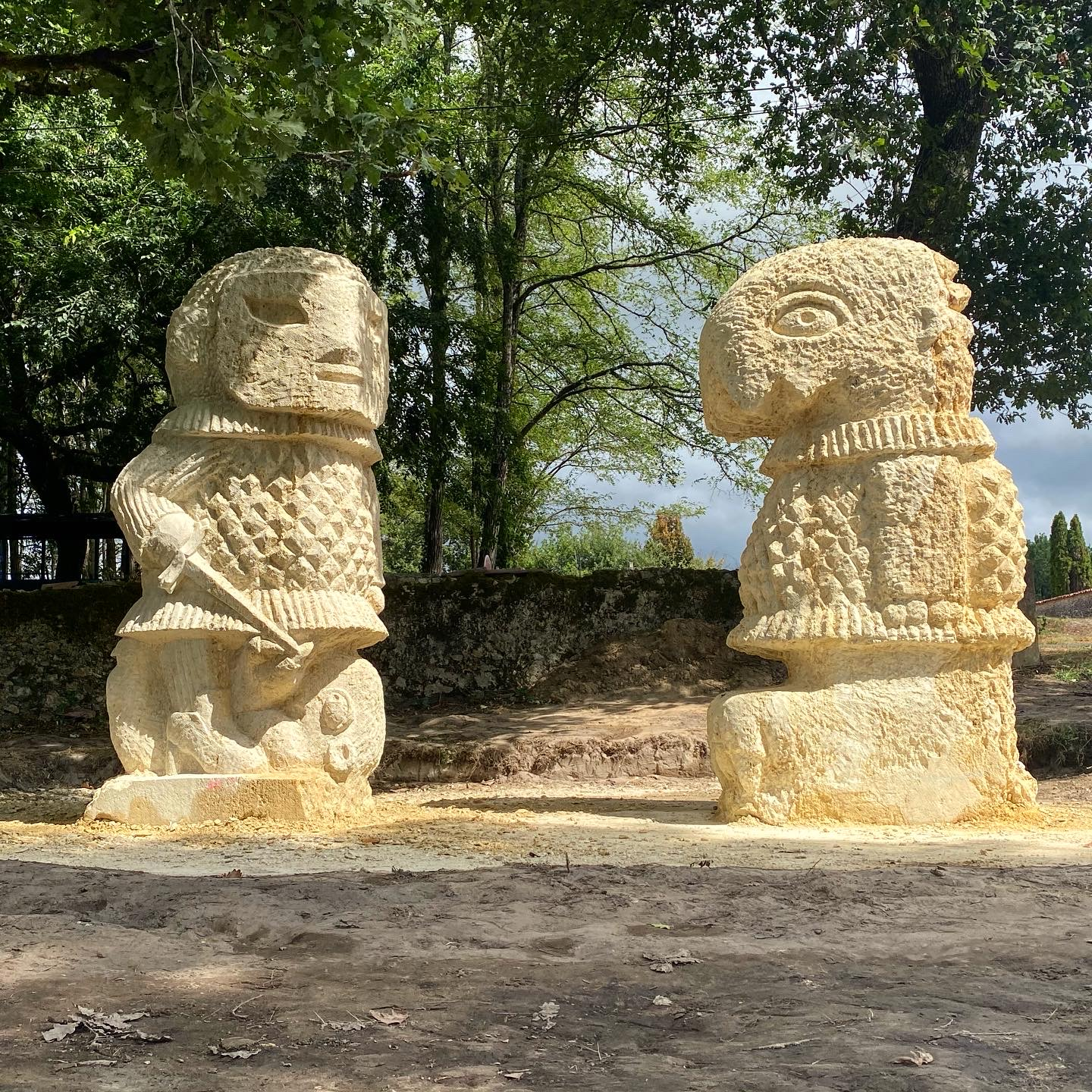
Saint Georges et son Dragon de Compagnie (2020), La Forêt d'Art Contemporain, Bélis, France

The Mangooses of Beauvais (2017), Beaupassage, Saint-Germain-des-Prés, Paris. Franklin Azzi Architecture et B&B Architectes, Emerige © Photograph by Charlotte Donker

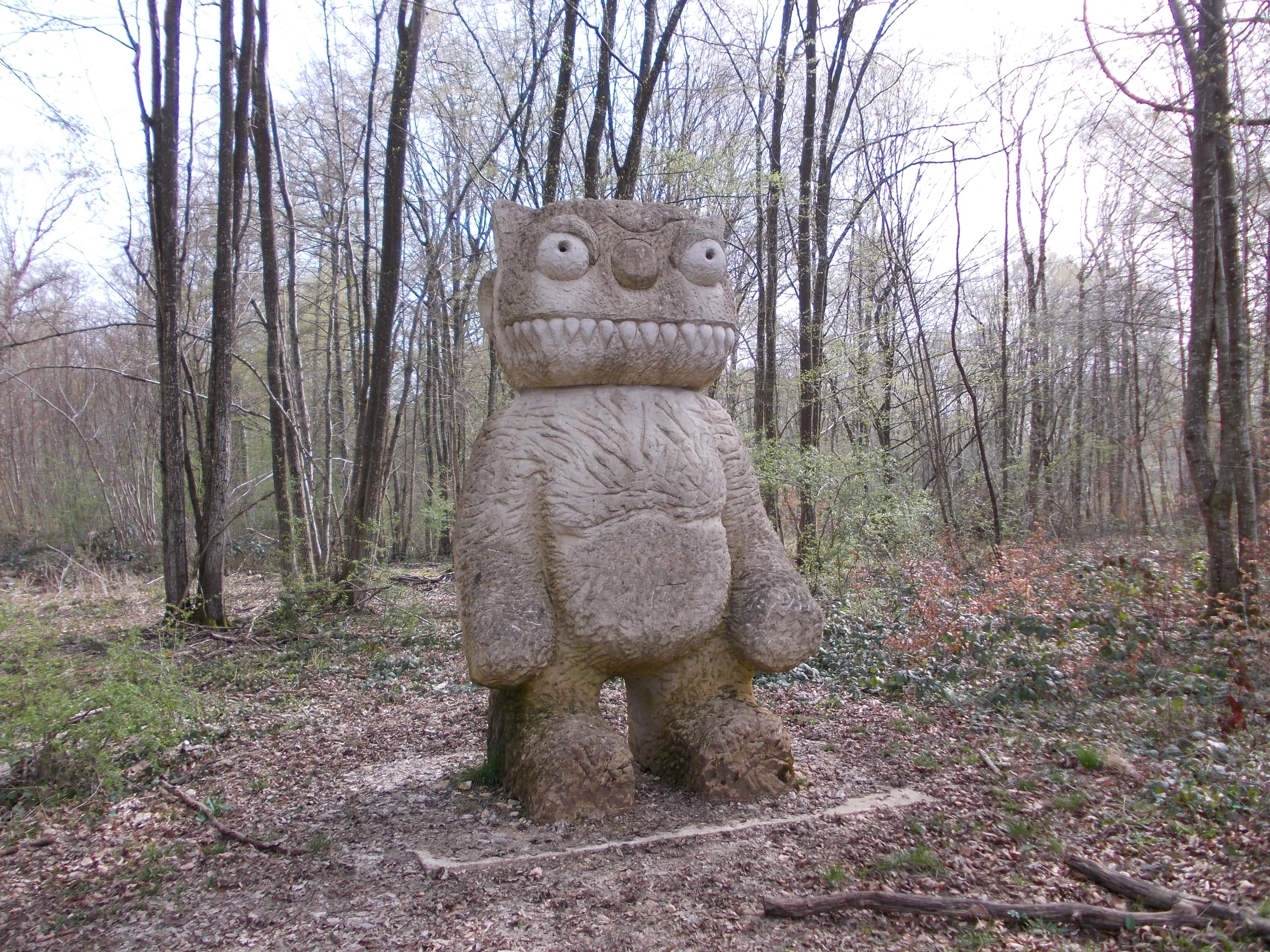
One of those who were too long in the woods (2010), Vent des Fôret, France

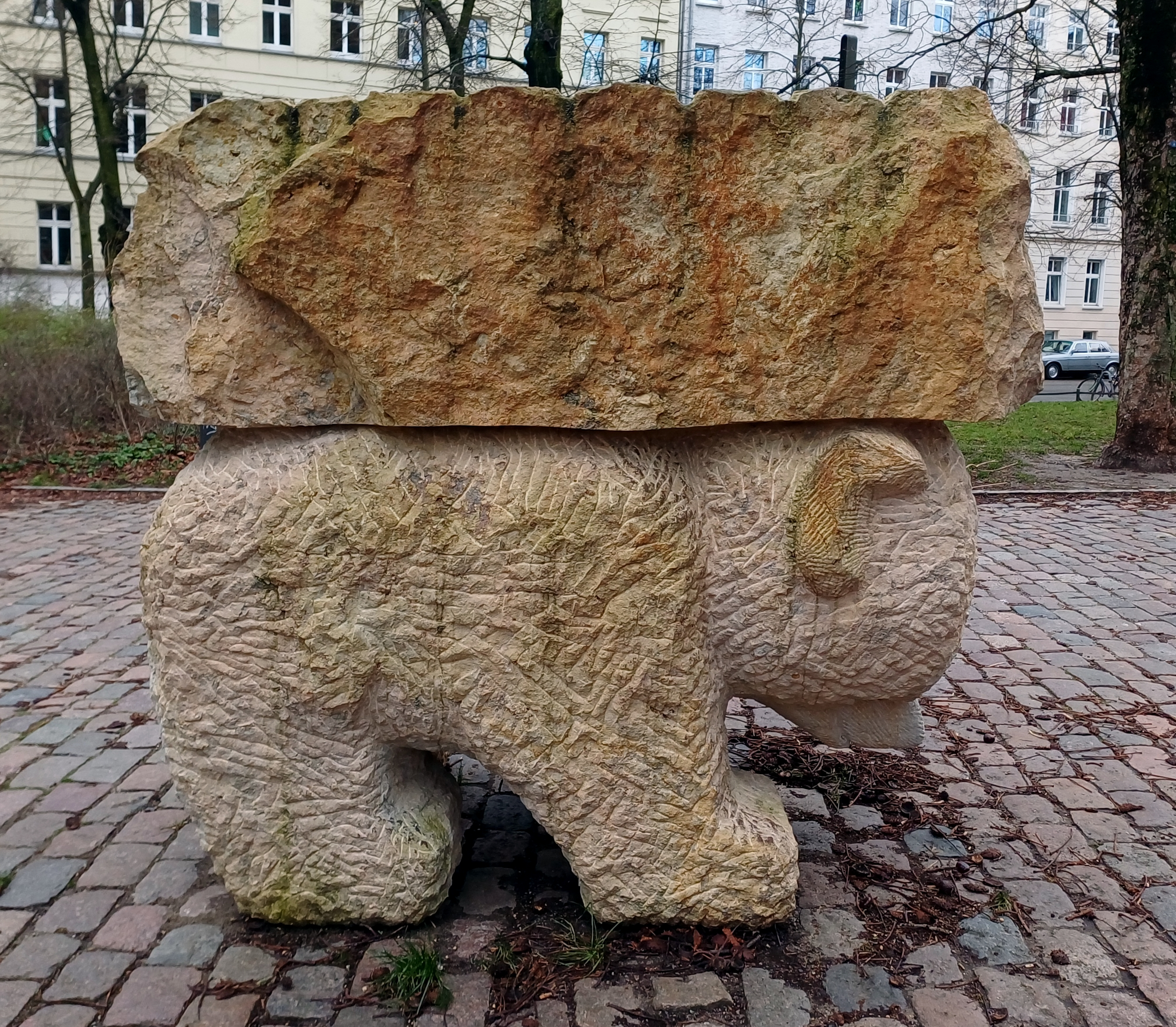
Why I bear / Grosser Lastenbär (2021), Zionskirchplatz, Berlin, Germany

== Exhibitions ==
Selected solo exhibitions

- 2025: The Return of the Alpine Clan, Pinakothek der Moderne, Munich
- 2025: Parade, Domaine de Chamarande, Chamarande
- 2024: The Bilss of Ignorance, CCA Andratx, Andratx, Mallorca
- 2023: Early Birds and Late Night Lizards, Nino Mier Gallery, New York
- 2022: Semigods of the Jockey Club, Skarstedt, East Hampton
- 2021: In this Garden he Reads the Diary of the World, Sorry We're Closed, Brussels
- 2020: I feel Air from other Planets, Nino Mier Gallery, Los Angeles
- 2019: Carnival, CAC Chapelle du Genéteil, Château-Gontier
- 2017: Metaphysical Casino, Semiose, Paris
- 2011: Die Geister die ich rief, Kunstverein Zweibrücken, Zweibrücken
- 2007: Vicerunt Viderunt Venerunt (with Uwe Henneken), The Breeder, Athens
- 2006: Galerie Rüdiger Schöttle, Munich

Selected group exhibitions

- 2025: Amsterdam Sculpture Biennale ArtZuid, Amsterdam
- 2024: The Atomic Age, Musée d'Art Moderne de Paris, Paris
- 2024: Des exploits, des chefs d'œuvre, MAC Musée d'Art Contemporain Marseille, Marseille
- 2023: Un Été au Havre, Le Havre
- 2022: Nothing Is Permanent – Parcours de sculptures, curated by Alex Reding, on the occasion of European Capital of Culture, Esch-sur-Alzette
- 2021: Supernature, Centre d'Art Contemporain, Yverdon-les-Bains
- 2020: Biennale Gherdëina 7 - a breath? a name? – the ways of worldmaking, Ortisei / St. Ulrich
- 2020: Restons Unis, Galerie Perrotin, Paris
- 2019: Foire Internationale d'Art Contemporain Hors les Murs, Jardin des Tuileries, Paris
- 2008: Busan Biennale, Busan
- 2007: The Present Order Is the disorder of the future, Frans Hals Museum, Haarlem / Hal & Hof

== Public collections ==
- Staatliche Graphische Sammlung München, Munich, DE
- Fonds régional d'art contemporain Normandie, Caen & Sotteville-lès-Rouen, FR
- Fonds régional d'art contemporain Corse, Corte, FR
- Centrum Beeldende Kunst Rotterdam, Rotterdam, NL
- Musée de la Loterie, Brussels, BE
- Sammlung Krohne, Duisburg, DE

== Bibliography ==
Monographs

- Stefan Rinck. Published by Michael Hering, Staatliche Graphische Sammlung München / Pinakothek der Moderne, Munich 2026. Verlag der Buchhandlung Franz und Walther König. Authors: Michael Hering, Max Henry, Monika Rinck, Christiane Voss, Benedikt Ledebur. ISBN 9783753309293.
- Bazon Brock, Stefan Rinck, Lubok Verlag, Leipzig / Sorry We're Closed, Brussels, 2016, ISBN 9783945111253.
- Stones. Gods. Humans. Animals. Photographs by Ute Rinck, text by Monika Rinck, This Side Up, Barcelona/Galeria Alegria, Barcelona/Sorry We're Closed, Brussels/Semiose, Paris, 2020, ISBN 9788412072044.
- Jeanne Brun, Jeremy Strick, Daniel S. Palmer, "Stefan Rinck", Pleased to meet you, n°9, Paris, Semiose éditions, 2021, ISBN 9782377390502.

Collective books

- Ansgar Reiß, Apokalyptik als Widerstand. Die Sammlung Tom Biber im bayrischen Armeemuseum, Verlag Kettler, 2014, ISBN 9783862062959.
- Kurt Beers, Richard Cork, 100 Sculptors of Tomorrow, Thames & Hudson, London, 2019, ISBN 9780500021477.
