= Franz West =

Austrian artist (1947–2012)

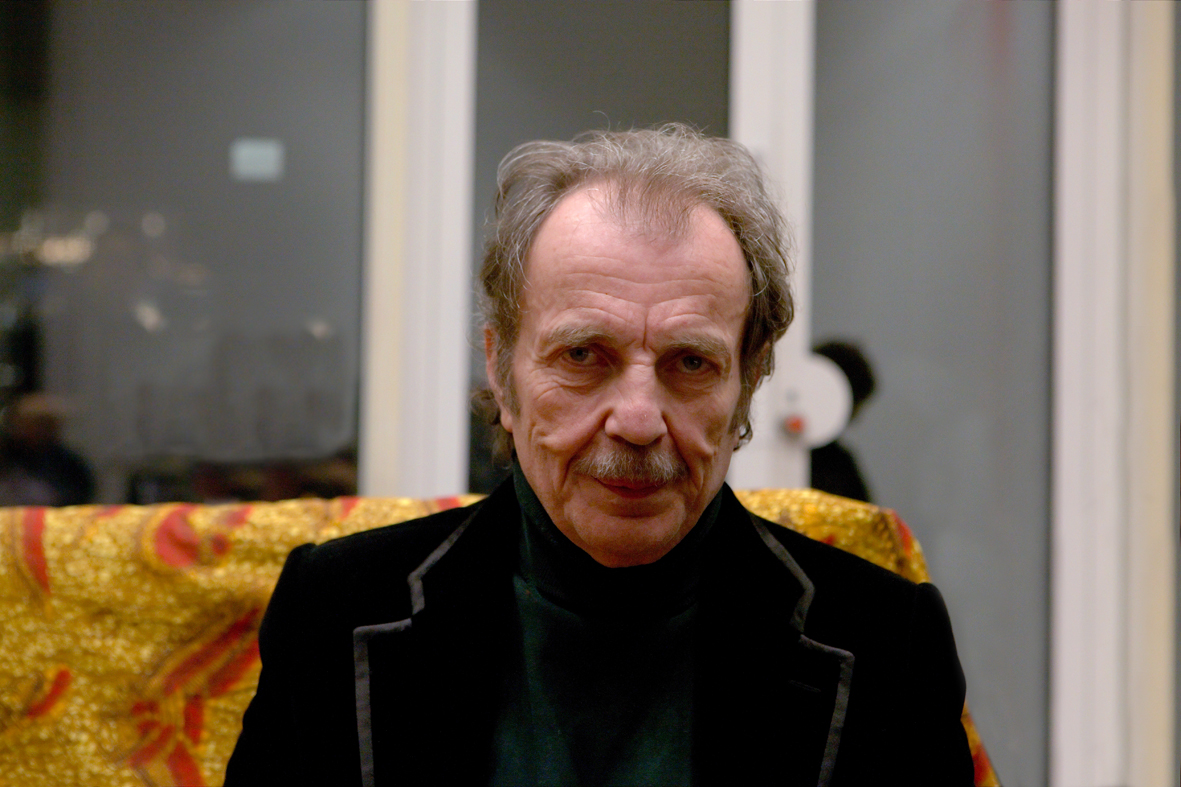
- Franz West (2009)
- Born: 16 February 1947; Vienna, Austria
- Died: 26 July 2012 (aged 65); Vienna, Austria
- Education: Academy of Fine Arts Vienna
- Known for: Sculpture; painting; drawing
- Notable work: The Ego and the Id
- Movement: Contemporary art
- Spouse: Tamuna Sirbiladze
- Awards: Otto Mauer-Preis (1986), Skulpturenpreis der Generali Foundation (1993), Wolfgang-Hahn-Preis, Museum Ludwig (1998)

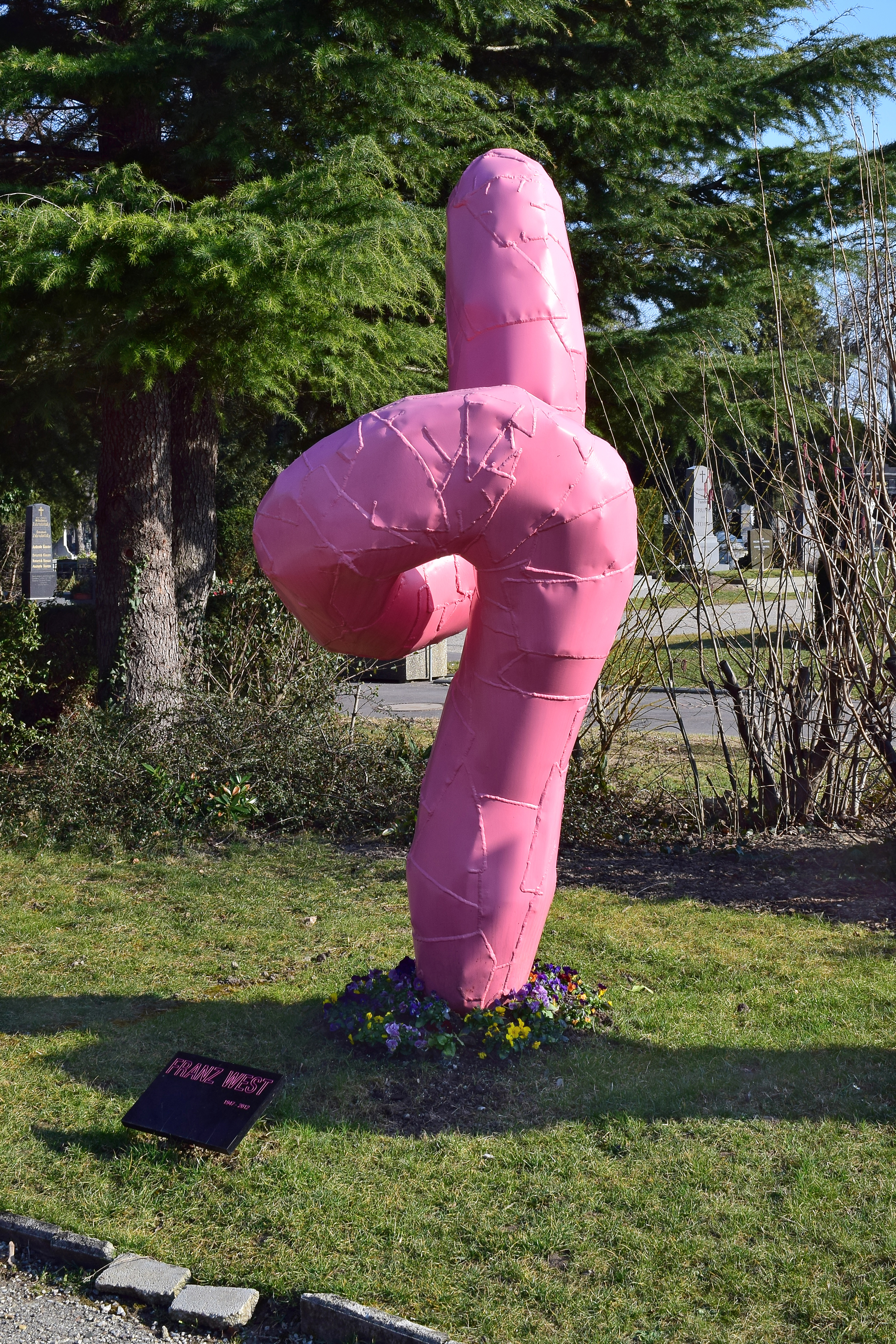
Grave of honour of Franz West at Zentralfriedhof, Vienna

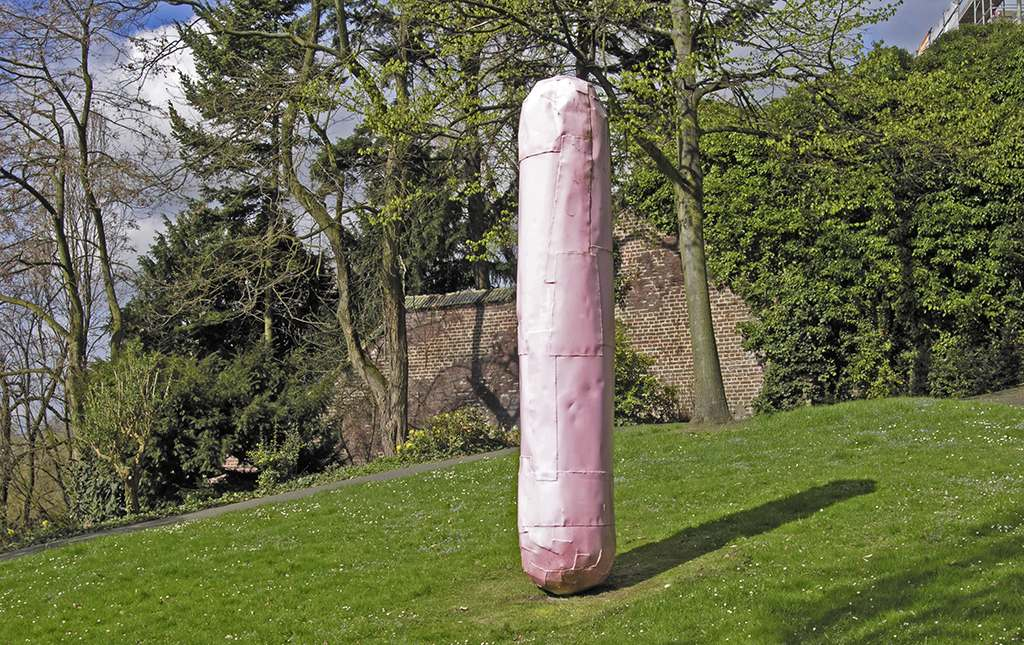
Flause (1998); Aluminium

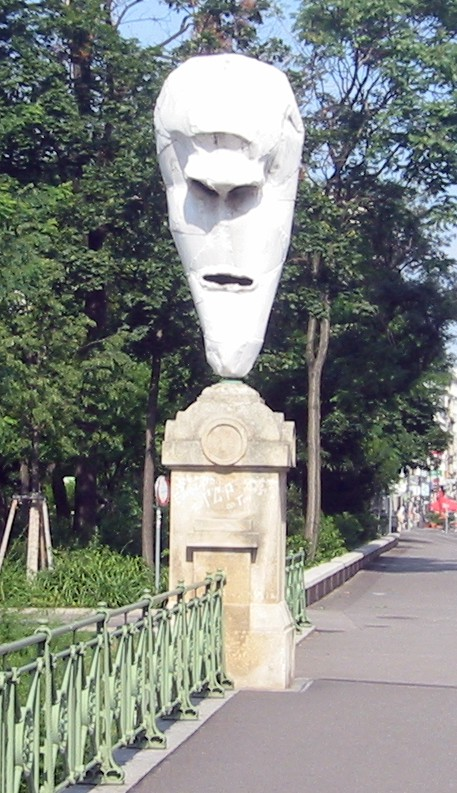
Lemurenkopf (Aluminium and white paint) 2001, (lemurs head; one of four lemurs heads), Stubenbrücke, Vienna, (close to Museum of Applied Arts, Vienna)

Franz West (16 February 1947 – 25 July 2012) was an Austrian artist.

He is best known for his unconventional objects and sculptures, installations and furniture work which often require an involvement of the audience.

== Early life and education ==
West was born on 16 February 1947 in Vienna. His father was a coal dealer, his mother a dentist who took her son with her on art-viewing trips to Italy. West did not begin to study art seriously until he was 26, when, between 1977 and 1983, he studied at the Academy of Fine Arts Vienna with Bruno Gironcoli.

== Work ==
West began making drawings around 1970 before moving on to painted collages incorporating magazine images that showed the influence of Pop Art. His art practice started as a reaction to the Viennese Actionism movement has been exhibited in museums and galleries for more than three decades. Over the last 20 years he had a regular presence in big expositions like Documenta and the Venice Biennale.

West's artwork is typically made out of plaster, papier-mâché, wire, polyester, aluminium and other, ordinary materials. He started to produce paintings, but then turned to collages, sculptures, portable sculptures called "Adaptives" or "Fitting Pieces", environments and furniture – "welded metal chairs and divans, some minimally padded and upholstered in raw linen." For his early sculptures, West often covered ordinary objects—bottles, machine parts, pieces of furniture and other, unidentifiable things—with gauze and plaster, producing "lumpy, grungy, dirty-white objects".

In the late 1990s, West turned to large-scale lacquered aluminum pieces, the first (and several after) inspired by the forms of Viennese sausages, as well as the shapes of the Adaptives. With their monochrome colors and irregular patchwork surfaces, these works were also meant for sitting and lying.

It doesn't matter what the art looks like but how it's used. Franz West

The Baltimore Museum of Art with help from former Senior Curator of Contemporary Art, Darsie Alexander, hosted the very first "comprehensive survey" to ever been done in the U.S. of Franz West's artwork which contained his latest artwork designed specifically for the Baltimore Museum of Art, The Ego and the Id – which "consists of two configurations of rumpled, ribbon-like loops rising some 20 feet high. One is bright pink, the other neatly painted in blocks of green, yellow, blue and orange. Both have round stools projecting from the lower ends of the loops."

For the season 2009/2010 in the Vienna State Opera Franz West designed a large scale picture (176 sqm) as part of the exhibition series "Safety Curtain", conceived by museum in progress.

Throughout his career, West engaged in collaborations with other artists, such as conceptual Artist Bernhard Cella, conceptual artist Douglas Gordon, musician Fred Jellinek, furniture maker Mathis Esterhazy, and the artist Tamuna Sirbiladze (West's widow). For another exhibition in 2012, West collaborated with fellow artist Anselm Reyle on a series of furniture sculptures.

=== Adaptives ===
Around 1980 West started to create "plaster objects, usually a few feet long, meant to be placed over the face, worn around the waist or held in the crook of the neck. Although they suggest masks and props for the commedia dell'arte, their shapes are usually ambiguous: no matter how figurative and sexual Mr. West's objects may be, they remain abstract. The pieces can be worn on the street or carried like a partner in an enraptured solipsistic dance. They leave the wearer looking both protected and trapped." His friend Reinhard Priessnitz called these "Passstücke", which was rendered into English as "Fitting pieces"; but West came to prefer another translation, "Adaptives".

== Exhibitions ==
- 1987 Wiener Secession, Vienna
- 1988 Kunsthalle Bern, Bern
- 1988 Kunsthistorisches Museum, Vienna
- 1988 P.S.1, New York
- 1990 Venice Biennale, Austrian Pavilion, Venice
- 1991 Villa Arson, Nice
- 1994 Museum of Contemporary Art, Los Angeles
- 1996 Museum moderner Kunst, Stiftung Ludwig Wien, 20er Haus, Vienna
- 1997 Fundaçao de Serralves, Porto
- 1997 Museum of Modern Art, New York
- 1998 Middelheim Open Air Sculpture Museum, Antwerpen
- 2000 Museum für Neue Kunst - ZKM Karlsruhe, Karlsruhe
- 2000 Renaissance Society, Chicago
- 2001 Museum für angewandte Kunst Wien, Vienna
- 2001 Deichtorhallen, Hamburg
- 2002 Musée d'Art Contemporain (MAC), Marseille
- 2002/03 Massachusetts Museum of Contemporary Art, North Adams, MA
- 2003 Kunsthaus Bregenz, Bregenz
- 2003 Whitechapel Art Gallery, London
- 2007 Werkstadt Graz, Graz
- 2008 Museum für angewandte Kunst Wien, Vienna
- 2008 Baltimore Museum of Art, Baltimore
- 2009 Los Angeles County Museum of Art, Los Angeles
- 2009 Fondation Beyeler, Basel
- 2009/10 Museum Ludwig, Cologne
- 2010 Museo MADRE, Neapel
- 2010/11 Kunsthaus Graz, Graz
- 2013 MUMOK, Vienna
- 2013 Inverleith House, Royal Botanic Garden Edinburgh, Edinburgh
- 2013 MMK Museum für Moderne Kunst, Frankfurt am Main
- 2014 Williams College Museum of Art, Williamstown, USA
- 2014 The Hepworth Wakefield, Wakefield
- 2016 21er Haus, Vienna
- 2017 Viva Arte Viva, The 57th Venice Biennale, Venice, Italy
- 2018/19 Centre Georges Pompidou, Paris, and Tate Modern, London

== Awards ==
- 1986: Otto Mauer Prize, Vienna
- 1988: City of Vienna Prize for Visual Arts
- 1993: Sculpture Award at the Generali Foundation
- 1998: Wolfgang-Hahn-Preis, Museum Ludwig, Cologne
- 2011: Golden Lion for Lifetime Achievement, Venice Biennale
- 2011: Austrian Decoration for Science and Art

== Personal life ==
West was married to the Georgian artist Tamuna Sirbiladze, with whom he had two children.

== Art market ==
West was represented by Gagosian Gallery, Galerie Meyer Kainer, Vienna, and Galerie Eva Presenhuber, Zürich, until his death in 2012. Previously, David Zwirner had represented West in the US until 2001. At Frieze Art Fair in 2011, West curated the Gagosian Gallery's booth. A portrait of West made by Rudolf Stingel sold for a price of more than $500,000. West's estate continues to be represented by Gagosian Gallery.

The non-profit Franz West Archive was established by West, Eva Badura-Triska and others in 1997. In 2012, just days before he died, West signed paperwork authorising the formation of the Franz West Private Foundation which also operated the Franz West Werknutzungs GmbH; after a five-year battle over the artist's estate, however, the Regional Court for Civil Law of Vienna concluded in 2017 that the foundation was created without a proper contract. The archive had previously sued the private foundation, as well as Gagosian Gallery and Galerie Eva Presenhuber, for selling the artist's furniture and photographs, claiming it owns the sole license for those works. In 2016, the archive sought to merge with the Museum Moderner Kunst Stiftung Ludwig Wien (mumok).

== Literature ==
External videos
- Lips, Philadelphia Museum of Art

- Franz West, Benedikt Ledebur: Extroversion ‒ a Talk, Schlebrügge.Editor, Vienna 2011. ISBN 978-3-902833-00-6
- Kaspar König (ed.): Franz West ‒ Autotheater. DuMont, Cologne 2009. ISBN 978-3-8321-9280-8
- Kristine Bell (ed.): Franz West ‒ Early work, October 30, 2004 - January 8, 2005. Zwirner & Wirth, New York 2004.
- Franz West: Franz West ‒ Displacement and Condensation. Gagosian Gallery, London 2006. ISBN 1-932598-36-7
- Klaus Thoman (ed.): Franz West ‒ Die Aluskulptur. Galerie Elisabeth und Klaus Thoman - Skulptur im Schlosspark Ambras, Innsbruck 2000. ISBN 3-88375-439-0
- Robert Fleck, Bice Curiger, Neal Benezra, Franz West. Phaidon Press, London, 1999. ISBN 0-7148-3825-X
