= Adobe Museum of Digital Media =

Virtual museum dedicated to digital art

The Adobe Museum of Digital Media was a virtual museum dedicated to digital art that launched on October 6, 2010. It also provided information on the relationship between digital media and society and was created and sponsored as a marketing exercise by Adobe Systems and produced in partnership with Spin+ and Unit 9.

The museum's exhibitions included a video exhibit by Tony Oursler and a project by Mariko Mori.

As of 2016, the museum is no longer accessible online.
