= Monika Rinck =

German journalist and author

Monika Rinck (born 29 April 1969) is a German writer.

== Life and work ==
After graduating from high school, Monika Rinck studied religious studies, history, and comparative literature in Bochum, Berlin and Yale. She writes poetry, prose and essays, which she published in various publishing houses and numerous anthologies (including Der Große Conrady) and literary magazines (including BELLA triste, Edit, Poetenladen), and works as a translator. In addition, she wrote lyrics for the Italoberlin singer-songwriter Bruno Franceschini and the composers Franz Tröger and Bo Wiget. She is the sister of the sculptor Stefan Rinck.

In 2008, the ORF broadcast her work AM APPARAT (your truth style) in the series literature as radio art. From 2008 to 2016, she performed together with Ann Cotten and Sabine Scho as Rotten Kinck Schow. She taught, amongst others, at the German Institute for Literature in Leipzig and the University of Applied Arts in Vienna and curated POETICA III in Cologne in 2017. She is a member of the PEN Center Germany, the German Academy for Language and Poetry and the Berlin Academy of the Arts. From 1999 to 2017 she worked at rbb – Inforadio. In 2015, she gave the Munster Poetics Lecture, and in 2019 the Lichtenberg Poetics Lecture in Göttingen.

== Works ==
=== Publications ===
- Neues von der Phasenfront. Gegenstand: unproduktive Phasen, ein Theorie-Comic. b_books 1998, ISBN 3-933557-00-3.
- Begriffsstudio [1996–2001]. Edition Sutstein 2001, ISBN 3-932731-06-9.
- Verzückte Distanzen, Gedichte. Zu Klampen, Springe 2004, ISBN 3-933156-81-5.
- fumbling with matches = Herumfingern an Gleichgesinnten. SuKuLTuR, Berlin 2005 (Reihe "Schöner Lesen", Nr. 38), ISBN 3-937737-42-1.
- Ah, das Love-Ding, Essays. Kookbooks, Idstein 2006, ISBN 3-937445-20-X.
- zum fernbleiben der umarmung, Gedichte. Kookbooks, Idstein 2007, ISBN 978-3-937445-23-6.
- pass auf, pony! ein Hörbuch, Illustration: Petrus Akkordeon. Edition Sutstein 2008, ISBN 978-3-932731-13-6.
- HELLE VERWIRRUNG / Rincks Ding- und Tierleben. Gedichte. Texte unter Zeichnungen. Kookbooks, Idstein 2009, ISBN 978-3-937445-37-3.
- ELF KLEINE DRESSUREN. Max Marek (Scherenschnitt) und Monika Rinck (Texte). edition sutstein, Berlin 2009, ISBN 978-3-932731-14-3.
- PARA-Riding. Laura (Riding) Jackson, Christian Filips und Monika Rinck (Gedichte, Essays, Übersetzungen). Roughbook 015, Berlin und Solothurn 2011.
- Helm aus Phlox. Zur Theorie des schlechtesten Werkzeugs. Mit Ann Cotten, Daniel Falb, Hendrik Jackson und Steffen Popp. Merve Verlag, Berlin 2011, ISBN 978-3-88396-292-4.
- ICH BIN DER WIND. Geschwinde Lieder für Kinder. Mit Audio-CD. Illustriert von Andreas Töpfer. Mit Wilhelm Taubert (Lieder), Katia Tchemberdji (Komposition), Monika Rinck (Texte). Kookbooks Berlin 2011, ISBN 978-3-937445-48-9.
- HONIGPROTOKOLLE. Sieben Skizzen zu Gedichten, welche sehr gut sind. Mit vier Liedern von Bo Wiget und einem Poster von Andreas Töpfer. Kookbooks, Berlin 2012, ISBN 978-3-937445-49-6.
- HASENHASS. Eine Fibel in 47 Bildern. Verlag Peter Engstler, Ostheim/Rhön 2013, ISBN 978-3-941126-50-3.
- Monika Rinck (= Poesiealbum 314), Lyrikauswahl von Klaus Siblewski, Grafik von Stefan Rinck. Märkischer Verlag Wilhelmshorst 2014, ISBN 978-3-943708-14-1.
- I AM THE ZOO / Candy – Geschichten vom inneren Biest. Mit Nele Brönner (Illustrationen). Verlag Peter Engstler, Ostheim/Rhön 2014, ISBN 978-3-941126-65-7.
- RISIKO UND IDIOTIE. Streitschriften. Kookbooks, Berlin 2015, ISBN 978-3-937445-68-7.
- LIEDER FÜR DIE LETZTE RUNDE. Ein Hörbuch. Text: Monika Rinck. Komposition: Franz Tröger. Gesang: Christian Filips. Kookbooks, Berlin 2015, ISBN 978-3-937445-72-4
- Wir. Essay. Verlagshaus Berlin 2015, ISBN 978-3-945832-06-6.
- DIE VERLORENE WELT / THE LOST WORLD. Im Rahmen des Modellprojektes Kunst/Natur. Künstlerische Interventionen im Museum für Naturkunde Berlin. Erscheint zur Ausstellung 25. April to 23 July 2017. Englische Übersetzung: Nicholas Grindell. Berlin, 2017, ISBN 978-3-946512-03-5.
- Kritik der Motorkraft. Brüterich Press Berlin 2017, ISBN 978-3-945229-04-0
- Champagner für die Pferde. Ein Lesebuch. S. Fischer Verlag 2019, ISBN 978-3-10-397420-1
- Alle Türen. Gedichte. kookbooks Berlin 2019, ISBN 978-3-937445-96-0
- Wirksame Fiktionen. Lichtenberg-Poetikvorlesung. Wallstein Göttingen 2019, ISBN 978-3-8353-3445-8
- Heida! Heida! He! Sadismus von irgend etwas Modernem und ich und Lärm! Fernando Pessoas sensationistischer Ingenieur Álvaro de Campos. Verlag Das Wunderhorn 2019, ISBN 978-3-88423-617-8
- Höllenfahrt & Entenstaat. Gedichte. Kookbooks, Berlin 2024, ISBN 978-3-948336-26-4.
- Das, was da ist. Zufall als Verfahren. Riemschneider Lectures. Salon Verlag, Köln 2025, ISBN 978-3-89770-590-6.

=== Translations ===
- István Kemény: Nützliche Ruinen, Gedichte. Aus dem Ungarischen von Orsolya Kalász, Monika Rinck, Gerhard Falkner, Steffen Popp. Gutleut Verlag 2007, ISBN 978-3-936826-64-7.
- János Térey: KaltWasserKult, Gedichte. Aus dem Ungarischen von Orsolya Kalász, Monika Rinck, Gerhard Falkner. Akademie Schloss Solitude, 2007, ISBN 978-3-937158-28-0.
- Bálint Harcos: Naive Pflanze, Erzählung. Aus dem Ungarischen von Orsolya Kalász und Monika Rinck. Akademie Schloss Solitude, 2008, ISBN 978-3-937158-40-2.
- István László G.: Sandfuge, Gedichte. Aus dem Ungarischen von Orsolya Kalász und Monika Rinck. Akademie Schloss Solitude, 2009, ISBN 978-3-937158-47-1.
- Tomaž Šalamun: Rudert! Rudert! Gedichte. Aus dem Slowenischen von Gregor Podlogar und Monika Rinck. Edition Korrespondenzen, 2012, ISBN 978-3-902113-95-5.
- András Gerevich: Teiresias' Geständnisse, Gedichte. Aus dem Ungarischen von Orsolya Kalász, Timea Tankó und Monika Rinck. Akademie Schloss Solitude, 2013, ISBN 978-3-937158-73-0.
- Kinga Tóth: Allmaschine, Gedichte. Aus dem Ungarischen von Orsolya Kalász und Monika Rinck. Ungarisch, Deutsch. Edition Solitude, 2014, ISBN 978-3-937158-80-8.
- István Kemény: ein guter traum mit tieren, Gedichte. Aus dem Ungarischen von Orsolya Kalász und Monika Rinck. Ungarisch, Deutsch. Matthes & Seitz, 2015, ISBN 978-3-95757-146-5.
- Márió Z. Nemes: Puschkins Brüste, Gedichte. Aus dem Ungarischen von Orsolya Kalász, Monika Rinck und Matthias Kniep. Ungarisch, Deutsch. Edition Solitude, 2016, ISBN 978-3-937158-95-2
- Magnus William-Olsson: Homullus absconditus, Gedichte. [HYPNO-HOMULLUS] Unter Hypnose aus dem Schwedischen ins Deutsche übersetzt und herausgegeben von Monika Rinck. (= roughbooks; 039). Urs Engeler, Solothurn 2016, ISBN 978-3-906050-24-9.
- Eugene Ostashevsky: Der Pirat, der von Pi den Wert nicht kennt, Gedichte. Aus dem amerikanischen Englisch von Monika Rinck und Uljana Wolf. kookbooks 2017, ISBN 978-3-937445-83-0.
- István Kemény: Ich übergebe das Zeitalter, Gedichte. Aus dem Ungarischen von Orsolya Kalász und Monika Rinck. Reinecke & Voß, 2019, ISBN 978-3-942901-35-2.
