= Tony Oursler =

American artist (born 1957)

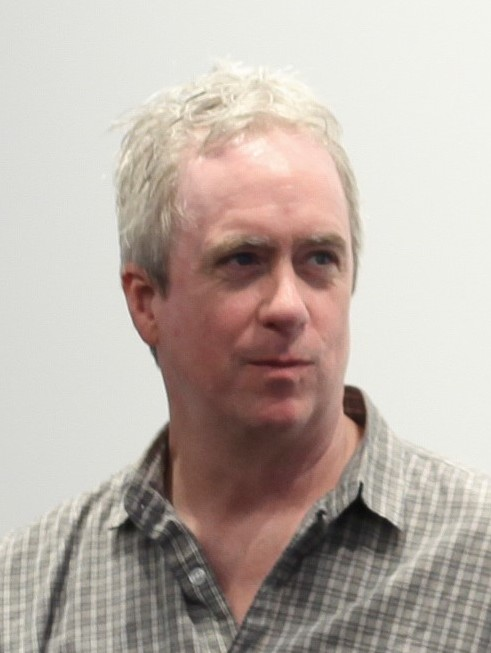
- In studio portrait (2017)
- Born: 1957; New York City
- Education: California Institute of the Arts, BFA (1979)
- Known for: Video art, performance art, installation art

Tony Oursler (born 1957) is an American multimedia and installation artist married to Jacqueline Humphries. He completed a Bachelor of Fine Arts at the California Institute of the Arts, Valencia, California, in 1979. His art covers a range of mediums, working with video, sculpture, installation, performance, and painting. He lives and works in New York City.

== Early life and education ==
Born in Manhattan in 1957, Oursler was brought up in a connected and well-to-do family that settled in Nyack, New York. He is the son of former Reader's Digest editor-in-chief Fulton Oursler Jr. and Noel Nevill Oursler. His grandfather was the writer Fulton Oursler.

At CalArts, his fellow students included Mike Kelley, Sue Williams, Stephen Prina, and Jim Shaw. John Baldessari — with whom he did an independent study — and Laurie Anderson were his teachers. Oursler moved back to New York in 1981 and was picked up by Electronic Arts Intermix.

In 1999, Oursler moved to a studio near New York City Hall.

== Work ==
=== Single-channel tapes: 1977–1989 ===
Tony Oursler is known for his fractured-narrative handmade videotapes, including The Loner (1980) and EVOL (1984). Billy Rubin describes EVOL as "(charting) the territory between our passion-charged personal narratives and the near impossibility of representing that desire visually or linguistically, the end result often being nothing more than banal cultural cliches."

These works involve elaborate soundtracks, painted sets, stop-action animation, and optical special effects created by the artist. The early videotapes have been exhibited extensively in alternative spaces and museums. They are distributed by Electronic Arts Intermix.

=== Early installations ===
Oursler's early installation works are immersive dark-room environments with video, sound, and language mixed with colorful constructed sculptural elements. In these projects, Oursler experimented with methods of removing the moving image from the video monitor using reflections in water, mirrors, glass, and other devices.

The early installation Son of Oil, presented at MoMA PS1 in 1982, links the dystopian feelings brought about by conspiracy theories with the perturbing politics of the oil industry.

The large-scale installation L7-L5 deals with science fiction as entertainment in contradiction to the terror of first-hand accounts of alien encounters. It was presented at The Kitchen (New York) and the Stedelijk Museum (Amsterdam) in 1984.

Spillchamber (1987) and Spillchamber 2 (1989) were displayed in New York and Japan.

=== Projection: 1991 ===
Oursler began working with small LCD video projectors in 1991 in his installation The Watching presented at documenta 9, featuring his first video doll and dummy. This work utilizes handmade soft cloth figures combined with expressive faces animated by video projection. Oursler then produced a series of installations that combined found objects and video projections. Judy (1993) explored the relationship between multiple personality disorder and mass media. Get Away II features a passive/aggressive projected figure wedged under a mattress that confronts the viewer with blunt, direct address. These installations led to great popular and critical acclaim.

Signature works have been his talking lights, such as Streetlight (1997), his series of video sculptures of eyes with television screens reflected in the pupils, and ominous talking heads such as Composite Still Life (1999). An installation called Optics (1999) examines the polarity between dark and light in the history of the camera obscura. In his text "Time Stream", Oursler proposed that architecture and moving image installation have been forever linked by the camera obscura noting that cave dwellers observed the world as projections via peepholes. The essay both presents a timeline of mimetic technology and serves as an archive of some of Oursler's influences. Oursler's interest in the ephemeral history of the virtual image led to large-scale public projects and permanent installations by 2000.

=== Public projects: 2000–2009 ===
The Public Art Fund and Artangel commissioned the Influence Machine in 2000. This installation marks the artist's first major outdoor project and thematically traced the development of successive communication devices from the telegraph to the personal computer as a means of speaking with the dead. Oursler used smoke, trees, and buildings as projection screens in Madison Square Park, NYC and Soho Square, London. He then completed several permanent public projects in Barcelona, New Zealand, and Arizona, including "Braincast" at the Seattle Public Library.

Million Colors (2006) was commissioned by the state of Arizona for permanent display at the Phoenix Convention Center in downtown Phoenix, Arizona. While researching this project, Oursler discovered that locals boast that the canyons and desert are graded in more than a million different colors. Aurora sightings and surrounding mountains evoke the lawless and anarchic past of American culture: abandoned goldmines and violent desperadoes of the Wild West. Near Suspicion Mountain, where temperatures reach 110 °F (43 °C), mirages are everyday occurrences. These distinct visual elements generate vivid accounts of UFO sightings and industrial-military conspiracy theories. Oursler steeped himself in the allure of the place and tried to give voice to the arid desert landscape. Narratives unique to the mysterious desert are reflected in the spoken texts of the installation, and the resulting collage of scripts performed by Arizona locals and immigrants is an attempt to let the colorful sedimentary history speak for itself.

In 2009, he created a series of commissioned video installations at the Frank Sinatra School of the Arts in Astoria, New York.

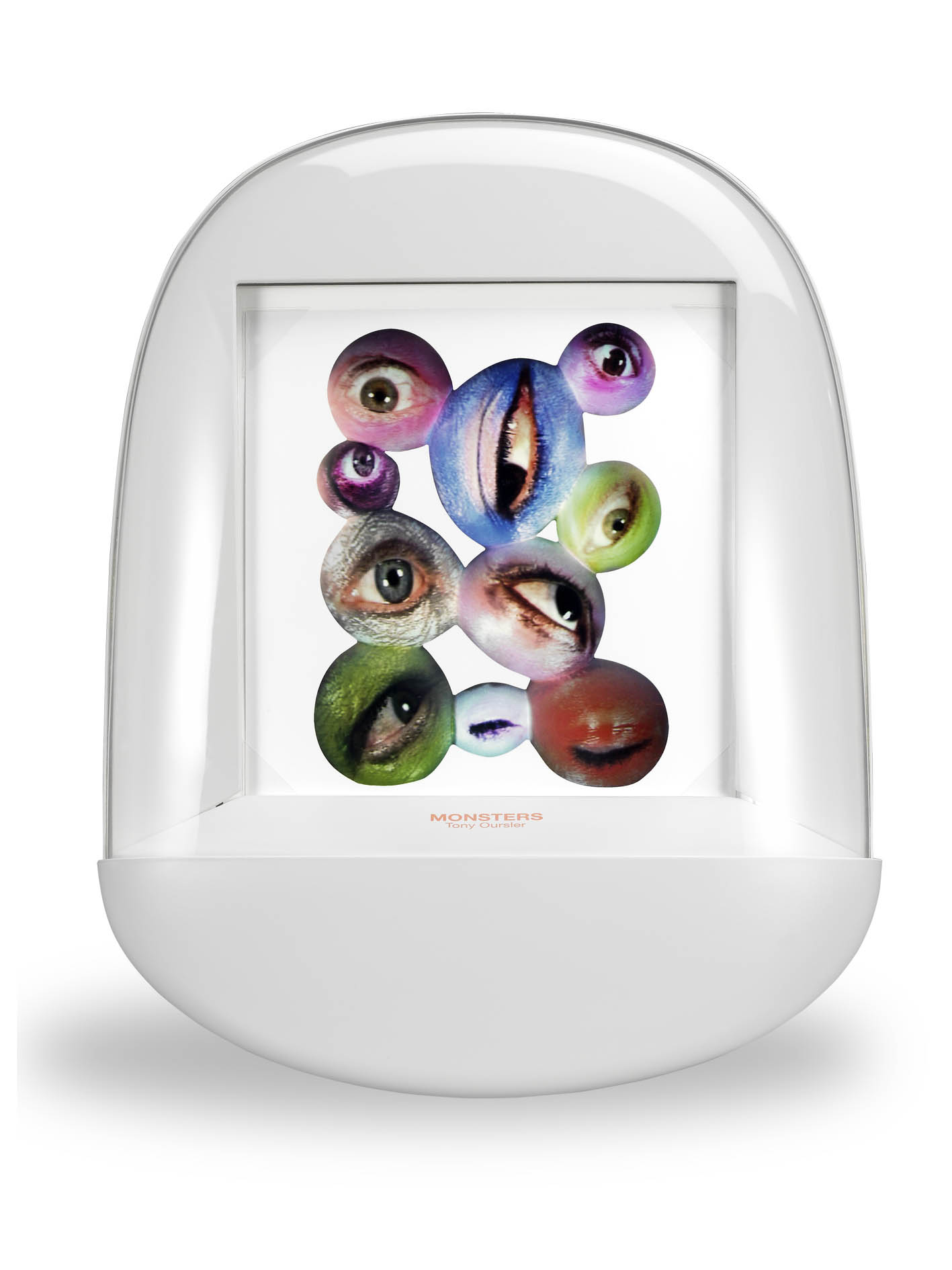
Tony Oursler:Monsters, Tony Oursler & éditions Take5

=== Public projects: 2010–2020 ===
In 2013, the Ekebergparken Sculpture Park commissioned Oursler to create the permanent installation Klang. The installation took the form of three parts: Klang, a large-scale video cave, Spectral Power, an iconic talking lamppost, and Cognitive / Dissonance, two complementary tree projections.

In 2014, Oursler simultaneously presented two large-scale installations in the Netherlands: X ergo Y at the Stedelijk Museum and I/O underflow at the Oude Kerk.

I/O underflow was inspired in part by Alan Turing.

Tear of the Cloud, commissioned by Public Art Fund and curated by Daniel S. Palmer, was presented at Riverside Park along the banks of the Hudson River in the summer of 2018. Technological developments in the region provided significant source material for the artist. The structure of the Internet, which blurs the boundary between culture and technology, is evident in the production of millions of bricks in Haverstraw, New York, and the long-distance communication of the talking drum as a precursor to the invention of Morse code. The artist explores the composition of Samuel Morse's last painting, The Muse, depicting his daughter Susan Walker Morse, uncannily foreshadowing the prototype of his first telegraph. 'The Headless Horseman and his horse are important references in Tear of the Cloud, as they gallop towards artificial intelligence, the chess-playing computer Deep Blue's famous knight sacrifice, facial recognition technologies, and bots which have provoked significant questions about our future', according to Oursler. He suggests connections between the recent DNA CRISPR-Cas encoding of Muybridge's Horse in Motion, the birth of the film industry at the Black Maria studio, the actress and proto-feminist Pearl White’s early silent films created on the Palisades, and the first transistor invented a few miles away at Bell Labs. Mining progressive social movements, the work touches on the mid-19th century Oneida community, their attempts at free love and highly successful manufacturing of silverware and animal traps; the Seneca Falls Convention; counterculture musical and psychedelic experimentation at Woodstock; and the remixing of nascent hip-hop culture in the South Bronx. The river is also characterized by darker connotations including pesticides, PCBs, Indian Point Nuclear Power Plant, and Sybil’s Cave, where the infamous Mary Rogers murder occurred. Oursler will bring these images – and more – to life, through the meticulously produced digital projections that evoke the scenarios with kaleidoscopic wonder", according to Lehmann Maupin. Oursler gave a talk on the piece at the New School, presented by the Public Art Fund. The piece was accompanied by a digitally published glossary of references."

6th, commissioned by the Museum of Old and New Art and Dark Mofo, was presented in the summer of 2019 at the now-defunct Beaumaris Zoo in Hobart, Tasmania. The piece revisited the structure which once held the last living Tasmanian tiger, and projected images into cages to "bear witness to a 'digital de-extinction' of the legendary Tasmanian tiger via sweeping projections, sound and light", as described by Dark Mofo. Concurrently, the nocturnal installation Beyond the Spectrum was presented at the Royal Tasmanian Botanical Gardens, which houses rare botanical specimens. The installation of 30 talking lights installed throughout the park were culled from the artist’s archive of more than 20 years of experimentation with the synchronization of light and sound. For this project, the lights were paired with specific plant species throughout the park to be discovered by the wandering viewer.

Also in 2019, Oursler presented Eclipse at the Fondation Cartier in Paris, for the exhibition Trees. The piece incorporates ecological themes and the looming loss of the "enchanted forest".

电流 (Current) (2019) is an installation piece spanning the Nanjing Eye Footbridge, a pedestrian walkway over the river.

=== Collaborations ===
While at California Institute of the Arts, Oursler founded the musical and performance group "Poetics" alongside fellow student Mike Kelley. The group included many collaborators over the years, such as John Miller, Jim Shaw, Mitchell Syrop, Bill Stobaugh, Don Kruger, Mark Madel, Art Byington, Dave Muller, Steven Vitiello, Bill Wintersole, Zoe Pettijohn, and Linda Post. In 1997–98, Kelley and Oursler presented the Poetics Project at Documenta X, as well as at venues in Los Angeles, New York, and Tokyo; through video projections, sound, and artworks, this installation re-created their experience at CalArts as members of a short-lived band. The installation is now on semi-permanent display in the collection of the Pompidou Centre.

Oursler was a longtime friend of David Bowie and collaborated with him on several works. Oursler created the background videos that played at David Bowie's 50th birthday party concert in 1997. In 2000, Oursler and Bowie collaborated on the four-minute short film Empty, in which Bowie's disembodied head provided narration. Oursler made the video to accompany Bowie's January 2013 single "Where Are We Now?", and a piece showing two Bowie heads in conversation with each other for the 2013 "David Bowie Is" exhibit organized by the Victoria and Albert Museum.

Oursler became friends with writer and artist Constance DeJong after he saw a performance of hers at the Minneapolis College of Art and Design in 1983. In 1986, they collaborated on Joyride. They then collaborated on the video and performance piece Relatives, first staged at The Kitchen in New York City in 1989. In 1995, DeJong and Oursler collaborated alongside musician Stephen Vitiello for their piece, "Fantastic Prayers." A CD-ROM of the project was released by Dia in 2000. DeJong is featured in The Watching, which was the first of Oursler's works to project videos onto dolls, and was presented at documenta 9. She performs as Madame X in Oursler's feature-length film Imponderable', presented at MoMa in 2016. The two have collaborated on numerous other occasions over the years.

Oursler has long collaborated with former MIT professor, filmmaker, artist, and bank robber Joe Gibbons. The two met in 1984 and went on to share a house in Jamaica Plain, Mass. while Oursler taught at the Massachusetts College of Art. In the late 1980s through the early ‘90s, Oursler and Gibbons produced a series of videos titled On Our Own. Oursler appears in Gibbons’ feature film The Genius, alongside Karen Finley and Tony Conrad.

Oursler's lifelong friendship and creative partnership with Tony Conrad began in 1980. Oursler introduced Mike Kelley to Tony Conrad, and the two appeared in Conrad's film Beholden to Victory (Hail the Fallen). Oursler and Kelley also appear in Conrad's later film WiP (Women in Prison). Conrad appears in and did the costuming for Oursler's film EVOL. One of Oursler and Conrad's major collaborations was The Influence Machine, a public installation shown at Madison Square Garden in 2000, for which Conrad composed the score. Oursler and Conrad's soundtrack was also published as a CD accompanying the catalogue for The Influence Machine. Conrad is featured in several of Oursler's projection works. The pair's final collaboration was TC: the most interesting man alive, presented at Lisson Gallery. Conrad died on April 9, 2016. Oursler is the director of Tony Conrad's archives.

Oursler met Kim Gordon in the late 1970s and collaborated with her on Making the Nature Scene, a short film examining New York club culture in the 1980s. In 1990, Oursler made the music video for Sonic Youth's song "Tunic (Song for Karen)." In 2005, Oursler collaborated with Sonic Youth and filmmaker Phil Morrison on the piece Perfect Partner. Gordon is featured in several of Oursler's works and contributed to the soundtrack material for Oursler's 2018 Tear of the Cloud, a site-specific multimedia installation along the banks of the Hudson River.

=== Film and video ===
See videos Electronic Arts Intermix

- "Tony Oursler Video Projections" by Tony Oursler, Inner-Tube Videos. 2002, 27 minutes, Color. NY: Inner-Tube Videos.

== Exhibitions ==
Oursler's work has been exhibited in public institutions including the Walker Art Center, Minneapolis; documenta VIII, IX, Kassel; Museum of Modern Art, New York; the Centre Georges Pompidou, Paris; the D.O.P. Foundation, Caracas; the Carnegie Museum of Art, Pittsburgh; Skulptur Projekte Münster; Museum Ludwig, Cologne; the Hirshhorn Museum, Washington, DC; the Tate, Liverpool. "Introjection", the artist's mid-career survey, was on view from 1999 to 2001 at the Williams College Museum of Art in Massachusetts, the Contemporary Arts Museum in Houston, the Museum of Contemporary Art, Los Angeles, and the Des Moines Art Center, Iowa. In 2000, Ourlser's installation The Darkest Color Infinitely Amplified was presented at the Whitney Museum of American Art and the Tate Modern.

From May 17 – September 18, 2005, the Metropolitan Museum of Art exhibited Tony Oursler at the Met: "Studio" and "Climaxed," two installations that had not previously shown in the United States.

Oursler's work was included in Glasstress at the 54th Venice Biennale (2011).

=== 2010 ===
From October–December 2010, the Lehmann Maupin Gallery hosted Oursler's exhibition entitled Peak. The exhibition was timed with Oursler's Valley, the inaugural exhibition of the Adobe Museum of Digital Media.

== Publications ==
In 2015, Oursler published Imponderable: The Archives of Tony Oursler with the LUMA Foundation.

Oursler was profiled by the magazine Men's Vogue in 2007. Writer Dan Halpern went with him to New Zealand, where he was finishing a massive projection-based installation piece on the private sculpture park of billionaire Alan Gibbs.

His monographs are as follows:

1985

- Oursler, Tony. Spheres d’Influence. Paris, France: Centre Georges Pompidou, 1985. Cassette included.

1995

- Oursler, Tony. Tony Oursler: Recent Works 1995–96. Madrid, Spain: Galeria Soledad Lorenzo, 1995.
- Oursler, Tony. Dummies, Clouds, Organs, Flowers, Watercolors, Videotapes, Alters, Performances and Dolls. Frankfurt, Germany: Portikus. 1995.

1997

- Oursler, Tony. My Drawings 1976–1996. Kassel, Germany: Kasseler Kunstverein, 1997.

1998

- Oursler, Tony. Tony Oursler. Madrid, Spain: Galeria Soledad Lorenzo, 1998.
- Oursler, Tony. Videotapes, Dummies, Drawings, Photographs, Viruses, Light, Heads, Eyes, and CD-ROM. Hannover, Germany: Kunstverein Hannover, 1998.

1999

- Oursler, Tony. Tony Oursler. Warsaw, Poland: Center for Contemporary Art Ujazdowski Castle, 1999.
- Oursler, Tony. Tony Oursler. Milan, Italy: Electa. 1999.

2000

- Oursler, Tony. The Influence Machine. London: Artangel; New York: Public Art Fund, 2000.
- Rothschild, Deborah and Tony Oursler. Tony Oursler Introjection: Mid-career survey 1976–1999. Williamstown: Williams College Museum of Art, 2000.

2001

- Janus, Elizabeth and Gloria Moore. Tony Oursler. Barcelona, Spain: Ediciones Poligrafa, 2001.
- Oursler, Tony. Tony Oursler. Barcelona, Spain: Ediciones Polígrafia; Valencia, Spain: Instituto Valenciano de Arte Moderno, 2001.

2002

- Oursler, Tony. Tony Oursler. Rome, Italy: Macro; Milan, Italy: Electa, 2002.
- Oursler, Tony. Parallel Lines: Drawings, Photos, Videos. Torino, Italy: In Arco, 2002.
- Oursler, Tony. Station. Stockholm, Sweden: Magasin 3 Stockholm Konsthall, 2002.

2003

- De Jong, Constance, Tony Oursler and Michael Zansky. De Jong Oursler Zansky, Installations. Rockland: Rockland Center for the Arts, 2003.

2004

- Courbet, Gustav and Tony Oursler. Correspondances Musée D’Orsay, Art Contemporain No. 2. Paris, France: Musée D’Orsay; Paris, France: Hazan Editions, 2004.
- Oursler, Tony. Blob. Madrid, Spain: Galeria Soledad Lorenzo, 2004.

2005

- Oursler, Tony. Tony Oursler: Dispositifs. Paris, France: Flammarion; Jeu de paume, 2005.
- Oursler, Tony. Tony Oursler: Dispositivos. Paris, France: Flammarion; Jeu de Paume, 2005.

2006

- Amy, Michaël and Tony Oursler. One to One: Conversation Avec Tony Oursler. Brussels, Belgium: Facteur Humain, 2006.
- Oursler, Tony. Blue Invasion. Sydney, Australia: Sydney Festival, 2006.
- Paparoni, Demetrio. The Living Eye of Tony Oursler and the Spirit of the Age. Torino, Italy: In Arco Books, 2006.

2007

- Oursler, Tony. Recent Works. Helsinki, Finland: Galerie Forsblom, 2007.

2008

- Oursler, Tony. Trunk Mask Bomb Frame Hatchet Crutch Queen. Madrid, Spain: Galeria Soledad Lorenzo, 2008.
- Oursler, Tony. Mirada Pensante/ Thinking Machine. Madrid, Spain: Turner Books, 2008.
- Oursler, Tony. High. London, England: Lisson Gallery, 2008.

2009

- Oursler, Tony. Cell Phones Diagrams Cigarettes Searches and Scratch Cards. New York: Metro Pictures, 2009.
- Oursler, Tony. Gaze Heuristic (With Drool). Torino, Italy: In Arco Books, 2009.

2010

- Oursler, Tony. Lock 2,4,6. Bregenz, Austria: Kunsthaus Bregenz, 2010.

2011

- Mercurio, Gianni, Demetrio Paparoni and Tony Oursler. Tony Oursler: Open Obscura. Milan, Italy: 24 ORE Cultura, 2011.
- Oursler, Tony. Projetor. Rio de Janeiro, Brazil: Automatica, 2011.

2012

- Oursler, Tony. Denouement. Verona, Italy: Fama Gallery, 2012.
- Oursler, Tony. Face to Face. Aarhus, Denmark: ARoS Aarhus Kunstmuseum, 2012.

2013

- Gielen, Denis and Tony Oursler. Vox Vernacular: An Anthology. Brussels: Mercatorfonds; MAC's/Grand-Hornu, 2013.
- Molmenti, Pompeo Marino and Tony Oursler. Where Should Othello Go? Paris, France: Louis Vuitton Malletier, 2013.

2015

- Oursler, Tony. I/O underflow. Amsterdam, Netherlands: Oude Kerk, 2015.
- Oursler, Tony. Tony Oursler. Athens, Greece: Bernier/Eliades Gallery; Agra Publications, 2015.
- Oursler, Tony. Imponderable: The Archives of Tony Oursler. Zurich, Switzerland: Luma Foundation, 2015.

2016

- Oursler, Tony. M*r>Or. Stockholm, Sweden: Magasin III, 2016.

2017

- Oursler, Tony. Imponderable with L7-L5. Barcelona, Spain: Caixa Forum, 2017.
- Oursler, Tony and Gustavo Rol. Paranormal. Mantova, Italy: Corraini Edizioni, 2017.

2019

- Paparoni, Demetrio. Tony Oursler: Le Volcan, Poetics Tattoo & UFO. Milan, Italy: Dep Art Gallery, 2019.

== Collections ==
The Carnegie Museum of Art (Pittsburgh), Fondation Cartier pour l'Art Contemporain (Paris), the Hammer Museum (Los Angeles), the Honolulu Museum of Art, the Milwaukee Art Museum, the Modern Art Museum of Fort Worth, the Museum of Modern Art (New York City), the Tate Modern, and the Whitney Museum of American Art (New York City) are among the public collections holding work by Oursler.

== Art market ==
Oursler is represented by:

- Anglim Gilbert Gallery, San Francisco, CA
- Lehmann Maupin Gallery
- Lisson Gallery

== See also ==
- Inside the Artist's Studio, Princeton Architectural Press, 2015. (ISBN 978-1616893040)
