= Davina Semo =

American artist working in sculpture

Davina Semo is an American artist (b. 1981, Washington DC) working in sculpture. She completed her MFA at the University of California, San Diego in 2006 and a BA in Visual Arts from Brown University in 2003.

== Life and work ==
Semo is best known for sculpture that embraces industrial construction materials like glass, concrete, and chain.

She has exhibited solo shows of her work at galleries Jessica Silverman Gallery, San Francisco, Marlborough Gallery, New York, and Ribordy Thetaz, Geneva, among others. Her work has been included in group exhibitions at the San Francisco Arts Commission, Contemporary Jewish Museum (San Francisco), the Sculpture Center (New York), and 2011 Bridgehampton Biennial, curated by Bob Nickas. In 2019, Semo had sculptural work exhibited alongside the painter Deborah Remington at Parts & Labor Beacon, NY.

=== Public art ===
In 2014, Semo installed a concrete-bunker-like building across from Barnard College, at Broadway and 117th Street. Titled “Everything is Permitted,” the structure was a gray concrete box with mitered corners, seven-feet tall and six-feet square and was installed as part of Broadway Morey Boogie, an exhibition of 10 public sculptures by many artists installed along Broadway between Columbus Circle and 166th Street.

=== Limited edition ===
RITE Editions in San Francisco created, in collaboration with the artist, a limited edition letter opener made of Damascus Steel.

=== Fashion ===
The designer Rachel Comey presented her RTW Fall 2019 show in Davina Semo's solo exhibition at Marlborough Gallery. The designer Hedi Slimane installed a double X chain piece in the Celine store in Paris.

== Quote ==
“I want the interaction with my work to be as strong as the experience of walking down the street,” she added, “to be affected by the weight, strength, visual layering, power, and associations of the environments we are born into, and make our lives in.”
