= Benedikt Ledebur =

Austrian poet, essayist and critic

Benedikt Ledebur is a poet, essayist and critic based in Vienna, Austria.

== Life and work ==
Ledebur was editor of two issues of Der Ficker – a homage to the bimonthly Der Brenner of Ludwig von Ficker – in 2005 and 2006. They were published on the occasion of exhibitions in Austria and Belgium showing among other Franz West, Clegg & Guttmann, Rudolf Polanszky and Tamuna Sirbiladze. Ledebur was the partner of Sirbiladze during her last years until her death 2016.

== Publications ==
- Poetisches Opfer,ISBN 3-85415-223-X, Ritter Verlag, Klagenfurt/Vienna 1998.
- ÜBER/TRANS/LATE/SPÄT, Onestarpress, Paris 2001.
- Nach John Donne,ISBN 3-9501830-1-9, Der Pudel, Vienna 2004.
- Genese,ISBN 978-3-939511-05-2, Onomato, Edition Schwarzes Quadrat, Düsseldorf 2008.
- Montaigne: Versuche der Selbstauflösung,ISBN 978-3-902665-16-4, Klever Verlag, Vienna 2010.
- Kuburebi/Baukasten,ISBN 978-9941-0-3978-2, Poems and essays, translated into Georgian, Dato Barbakadse (Ed.), Mertskuli-Verlag, Tbilisi 2011.
- Ein Fall für die Philosophie: Über Dichtung, Rhetorik und Mathematik,ISBN 978-3-902665-84-3, Klever Verlag, Vienna 2014.
- Das Paradox des Realen. Essays zur Kunst,ISBN 978-3-902833-66-2, Schlebrügge.Editor, Vienna 2015.
- karis ciskwili/Windmühle - A wreath of sonnets for Tamuna Sirbiladze, translated into Georgian by Lulu Dadiani, ISBN 978-9941-26-053-7, Tbilisi 2017.
- portraits of friends, ISBN 978-9941-529-68-9, Marburg 2026.

== Cooperations ==
- Zwischen den Zeilen, Volume 22, Urs Engeler (Editor), John Donne - Translations Engeler-Verlag, Zurich 2003.
- Zwischen den Zeilen, Volume 23, Theresia Prammer (Editor), Ein Gedicht und seine Nachbilder. Zu Übersetzungen von Giacomo Leopardis l´infinito, Engeler-Verlag, Zurich 2004.
- Zu einer Semiologie der Sinne, Rudolf Polanszky, Onestarpress, Paris 2005.
- Der Ficker No. 1, Benedikt Ledebur (Editor), Schlebrügge Editor, Vienna 2005.
- Wolfenbütteler Übersetzergespräche IV - VI, Olaf Kutzmutz & Adrian La Salvia (Editor), Translation: Shadowtime / Schattenzeit, by Charles Bernstein, Bundesakademie für kulturelle Bildung, Wolfenbüttel 2006.
- Der Ficker No. 2, Benedikt Ledebur (Editor), Schlebrügge.Editor, Vienna 2006.
- Displacement and Condensation, Franz West, The Form of Enjoyment: Fragrances Obsessed by Herb, or the Sneeze in Art, Gagosian Gallery, London 2006.
- Aphatischer Muse Rede, Eulogy on Brigitta Falkner, Vienna 2007.
- Das Kosmöschen in chaotischer Auslese, zu Dominik Steigers Ausstellung Kosmöschen Steiger in the gallery Hohenlohe & Kalb, Vienna 2008.
- Bildsatz, Franz Josef Czernin, Martin Janda (Editors), on Werner Feiersinger, Du Mont Buchverlag, Cologne 2008.
- Nichts tun, Oswald Egger (Editor), Zum Verhältnis von Dichtung und Mathematik, Das böhmische Dorf, Neuss-Holzheim 2009.
- The Paradox of the Real in Art in Hyper Real - The Passion of the Real in Painting and Photography Walther König, Cologne 2010.
- 4 Schnellgedichte und 6 Schnellzeichnungen, in: KLEINE AXT, Ulf Stolterfoht (Editor), www.kleineaxt.wordpress.com, 1. November 2010.
- Ethik, Geld, Politik und Poetik - Fragen zum Fall Ezra Pounds, dem Dichter der Pisan Cantos, in: TIMBER! Eine kollektive Poetologie, Ulf Stolterfoht (Editor), www.timberpoetologie.wordpress.com, 27. Februar 2011.
- Extroversion - A Talk, with Franz West, Schlebrügge.Editor, Vienna 2011.
- Dieter Roths weißes Blatt Gedichte, kalmenzone literary magazine, No. 7, www.kalmenzone.de, Cornelius van Alsum (Ed.), April 2015.
- Proof, Michael Huey, Peter Bogner (Ed.), Friedrich Kiesler Foundation, Vienna 2015.
- Translinear Structures, Rudolf Polanszky, Andrea Schantl (Ed.), The Poetic Character of the Meaningless, Kerber Verlag, Bielefeld 2015.
- Tamuna Sirbiladze - Eve's apple, in memory, curated by Benedikt Ledebur, Charim Galerie, Vienna 2016.
- Two Paintings by Michaela Eichwald at the Group Exhibition "The Unknown Masterpiece" and a Further Balzac Book Title and The Power of Women and the Freedom in Collages - Franz Wests Designs in Das unbekannte Meisterwerk / The Unknown Masterpiece, ISBN 978-3-903172-07-4, Christian Meyer (Hg./ed.), Schlebrügge.Editor, Wien 2017
- Gestalt und Prozess, in Zeitschrift für Kulturphilosophie 2017|1, ISBN 978-3-7873-3194-9, Ralf Konersmann, Dirk Westerkamp (Editors), Felix Meiner Verlag, Hamburg 2017.
- Gedenken und Ästhetik - Reflexionen und Lektüre zur Ausstellung "Der Sand aus den Uhren" samt trauriger Exkursion in die eigene Familiengeschichte, in Der Sand aus den Uhren, ISBN 978-3-7092-0255-5, Benjamin A. Kaufmann (Ed.), Passagen Verlag, Vienna 2017.
- Tamuna Sirbiladze,ISBN 978-1-941701-80-5, Benedikt Ledebur, Lucas Zwirner (Editors), David Zwirner Books, New York 2017.
- Max Henry 1820, curated by Benedikt Ledebur, Charim Galerie, Vienna 2018.
- The act of reclining / L'acte de s'allonger, in: Franz West, p. 186 ISBN 978-1-849766135, Mark Godfrey & Christine Macel (Editors), Paris, London 2018.
- On the Song and Language of Animals - An etude from memory on Franz West's Otium, in: Otium - Franz West, Booklet ISBN 978-3-96098-420-7, Astrid Ihle (Editor), Heimo Zobernig (Concept), Koenig Books Ltd, London 2018.

== Awards ==
- 2015: Art Critics Award
- 2026: "neue texte"-Essaypreis
