= Tamuna Sirbiladze =

Austrian artist (1971–2016)

Tamuna Sirbiladze (Georgian: თამუნა სირბილაძე; 12 February 1971 – 2 March 2016) was an artist based in Vienna, Austria.

== Life ==
Sirbiladze was born 12 February 1971 in Tbilisi in Georgia and died 2 March 2016 in Vienna. She studied art at the Tbilisi State Academy of Arts (1989–1994) in Georgia and later the Academy of Fine Arts Vienna (1997–2003) and Slade School of Fine Art, London, 2003. She was the widow of fellow artist Franz West (1947–2012) and collaborated with West on a number of projects.

Sirbiladze's background influenced her approach to painting: "Sirbiladze was exposed to art mostly through books‍—‌her home country had few museums. She knew early on that she wanted to be an artist, however, and cited the colors of the art she came across as the reason she ended up painting."

== Work ==
Sirbiladze painted fast, and sometimes incorporated text into her work. An Art in America review in 2015 noted the "energetic content" of her work, adding that "Sirbiladze’s line is spare; abundant, creamy negative space supports the gentle diagonal flow of marks". Alex Greenberger wrote that her "... paintings played with the division between figuration and abstraction" and "... recall the work of Henri Matisse and the Impressionists in their light, expressive brushwork".

== Publications ==
- Tamuna Sirbiladze, Benedikt Ledebur, Lucas Zwirner (Herausgeber), David Zwirner Books, New York 2017
- titles, Onestar press, Paris 2014
- Der Ficker - zweite Folge, Benedikt Ledebur (Ed.), Schlebrügge, Wien 2006
- artists and poets, Ugo Rondinone (Ed.), Secession, Wien 2015
- No Man'S Land: Woman Artists from the Rubell Collection, Rubell Family Collection, Miami 2015
- Tamuna Sirbiladze - Not Cool but Compelling, Stella Rollig, Sergey Harutoonian (Herausgeber) Verlag der Buchhandlung Walther und Franz König, published on the occasion of the retrospective at belvedere21 Museum, Vienna, 2024

== Exhibitions ==
1997

- Bricks and Kicks - Weather, Vienna

1999

- The Sun Will Rise - Old Gallery, Tbilisi
- Graduate Group Show - Academy of Fine Art, Tbilisi
- Auction show - Tea House Gallery, Tbilisi
- Neue Malereien - Museum der Modernen Kunst, Tbilisi

2000

- Juana e Juanita - Galleria Juana de Aizpuru, Madrid
- Aktuellestudentinnenarbeiten - kuratiert von Kasper König, Semperdepot, Wien
- Cultural Sidewalk - Gumpendorf2000- curated by Heidulf Gerngross, Vienna

2001

- Point of View - Künstlerhauspassage, Vienna
- Plakatentwürfe, Cooperation with Franz West - Galerie Gisela Capitain, Cologne

2002

- Parlez Vous Francais, English Dictionary - Mac, Marseille
- Apartement Franz West - Deichtorhallen, Hamburg

2003

- La-Bas - curated by Stephan Schmidt-Wullfen, Nexus Kunsthalle, Saalfelden
- Franz West and Friends, kuratiert von Anthony Auerbach, Austrian Cultural Forum, London
- Moon Light - Cooperation with Franz West, Galerie Meyer Kainer, Vienna

2004

- Update - curated by Hans Peter Wipplinger, Künstlerhaus, Wien und Museum Moderner Kunst, Passau
- Le Opere I Giornie - Certosa Di San Lorenzo, Padula, Salerno
- Video Art Expo - curated by Luca Gurci, Bari

2005

- Camere/Chambers - Rum, Roma
- The Red Thread - Educational Alliance Gallery, New York
- Seconda - Biennale internationale d'arte di Ferrara, Ferrara

2006

- Der Ficker - Gruppenausstellung mit Clegg & Guttmann, Rudolf Polanszky, Muntean & Rosenblum, Franz West, Wittgensteinhaus, Wien
- Esperimento Illuminismo - Albertina, Vienna
- Der Ficker - Foundation de 11 Lijnen, Ouldenburg

2007

- Sequence 1, Palazzo Grassi, Kooperation mit Franz West, Pinault, Venice
- Hamsterwheel, Arsenale, Venice
- Inconcurrence - kuratiert von Franz West, Galerie Collet Park, Paris
- Der Ficker - Gruppenausstellung mit Sophie von Hellermann, Mick Peter, Josh Smith, Thea Djordjadze, Emily Wardill, Franz West, Jonathan Viner Gallery, London

2008

- Tamuna Sirbiladze: Paintings and Elements, Jonathan Viner Gallery, London
- Grazy - Werkstatt, Graz
- Pretty Ugly, Gavin Brown's Enterprise - New York City, NY

2009

- About Premises and Promises - Galerie Andreas Huber, Vienna
- Until The End Of The World - A.M.P., Athen
- The Read Thread, Galerie Dana Charkasi, Vienna

2010

- Laszive Lockungen - Galerie CUC Charim Unger Contemporary, Berlin
- Franz West - Double Squint - Almine Rech Gallery, Brussels
- Das Dinghafte in der Kunst - Galerie Nikola Vujasin, Vienna

2011

- Austria Davaj! -Creative Forces of Austria - curated by Kandeler Fritsch, MAK, und Irina Korobina, Schusev - State Museum for Architecture, Moscow

2012

- Naked Ground - Galerie Lisa Ruyter, Vienna
- Gaiety Is The Most Outstanding Feature of the Soviet Union - Saatchi Gallery, London

2013

- 39greatjones - curated by Ugo Rondinone, Galerie Eva Presenhuber, Zürich
- V-Collection - Galerie Charim, Vienna

2014

- Tamuna Sirbiladze - Damona - Galerie Charim, Vienna
- Siehe was dich sieht - belvedere 21, Belvedere Museum, Vienna
- Rade Petrasevic & Tamuna Sirbladze - V.ARE, Parkhaus Cineplex, Vienna

2015

- artists and poets - curated by Ugo Rondinone, Secession, Vienna
- Tamuna Sirbiladze - Take it Easy, Half Gallery, New York City, NY
- Tamuna Sirbiladze - Good Enough is Never Good Enough, James Fuentes LLC, New York City, NY
- No Man's Land - Rubell Family Collection, Miami

2016

- Two Projects - Tamuna Sirbiladze - Almine Rech Gallery, Brussels
- Tamuna Sirbiladze - Eve's apple - in memory, curated by Benedikt Ledebur, Galerie Charim, Wien

2017

- Tamuna Sirbiladze - Traces of Life, 08. 04. – 27. 05., Galerie Eva Presenhuber, Löwenbräu Areal, Zürich
- Amazing Girls / It’s complicated, 17. 05. – 18. 06., Group exhibition, Kevin Space, Vienna
- Gnomons, Group exhibition with Lawrence Weiner, Walter Robinson, Julie Ryan, Jason Stopa, Carolyn Marks Blackwood, Lazar Lyutakov, Doug Johnston und Karin Fauchard. 08. 07., Non-Objectif Sud (NOS), Tulette, France

2018

- almost something like revenge, 13.2. – 7.4., curated by Benedikt Ledebur, Galerie Charim Vienna
- Known Unknowns, 21.3. – 24.6. Gruppenausstellung mit Mona Osman, Stefanie Heinze, Saskia Olde Wolbers und Alida Cervantes, Saatchi Gallery, London
- Elisabeth Penker, Laure Prouvost & Tamuna Sirbiladze: 64 hrs, 08.11. – 25.11., WIELS Project Room Brussels

2019

- Tamuna Sirbiladze, 21.2. – 5.4., curated by Rodolphe von Hofmannsthal, David Zwirner London, upper room London
- Station Wien - West, 24.9. - 29.9, project statement at Prallel Vienna, with Andreas Donhauser, Andrew Mezvinsky, Anton Herzl, Benedikt Ledebur, Christian Eisenberger, Er _ich Joham Stefan, Franz Kapfer, Franz West, Fred Jelinek, Gilo Moroder, Heidulf Gerngross, Hans Riedel, Herbert Lachmayer, Heiri Häfliger, Julie Ryan, Leopold Kessler, Marcel Hauf, Michael Mautner, Natia Kalandaze, Philip Quehenberger, Reinhard Bernsteiner, Ronald Zechner, Rudolf Polanszky, Tamuna Sirbiladze

2020

- Denis Collet, Elisabeth Penker, Laure Prouvost, Tamuna Sirbiladze, 7.3. – 9.5., Galerie Hussenot, 5 bis rue de Haudriettes, Paris, cuated by Eric Hussenot
- Summer - Karel Appel, John M Armleder, Jean-Baptiste Bernadet, Brian Calvin, Johan Creten, Gregor Hildebrandt, Allen Jones, Alexandre Lenoir, Taryn Simon, Tamuna Sirbiladze, Thu Van Tran, Tursic & Mille, 13.6. – 1.8., Almine Rech, 64 rue de Turenne, Paris

2021

- Il sorriso della sfinge, curated by Ilari Valbonesi, Collegium Artisticum, Sarajevo

2022

- Tamuna Sirbiladze: Sculpting in color, curated by Nina Kintsurashvili, Gallery Artbeat, Tbilisi

2024

- Tamuna Sirbiladze - Not Cool but Compelling, 22.3. – 11.8., curated by Sergey Harutoonian & Vasilena Stoyanova im/at belvedere 21, Belvedere Museum Vienna

2026

- Stellprobe, 10.7. – 4.10., curated by Stella Rollig & Luisa Ziaja, Collection Acquisitions from the Last Decade in a Display of Heimo Zobernig im/at belvedere 21, Belvedere Museum Vienna
